= Mass in C major =

Mass in C major may refer to:

- Mass in C major (Beethoven), by Ludwig Beethoven (1807)
- Missa Cellensis in honorem Beatissimae Virginis Mariae, by Joseph Haydn (1766)
- Missa in tempore belli, or Mass No. 10 in C major, by Joseph Haydn (1796)
- Sparrow Mass, or Missa Brevis No. 10 in C major, by Wolfgang Amadeus Mozart (1775-76)
- Coronation Mass (Mozart), or Mass No. 15 in C major, by Wolfgang Amadeus Mozart (1779)
- Mass No. 4, by Franz Schubert (1828)

== See also ==
- List of masses by Joseph Haydn
- List of masses by Wolfgang Amadeus Mozart
- Mass in C minor (disambiguation)
