= Mass in C major, K. 258 "Piccolomini" =

1776 composition by W. A. Mozart

Missa in C major
- "Piccolomini"
- Mass by W. A. Mozart
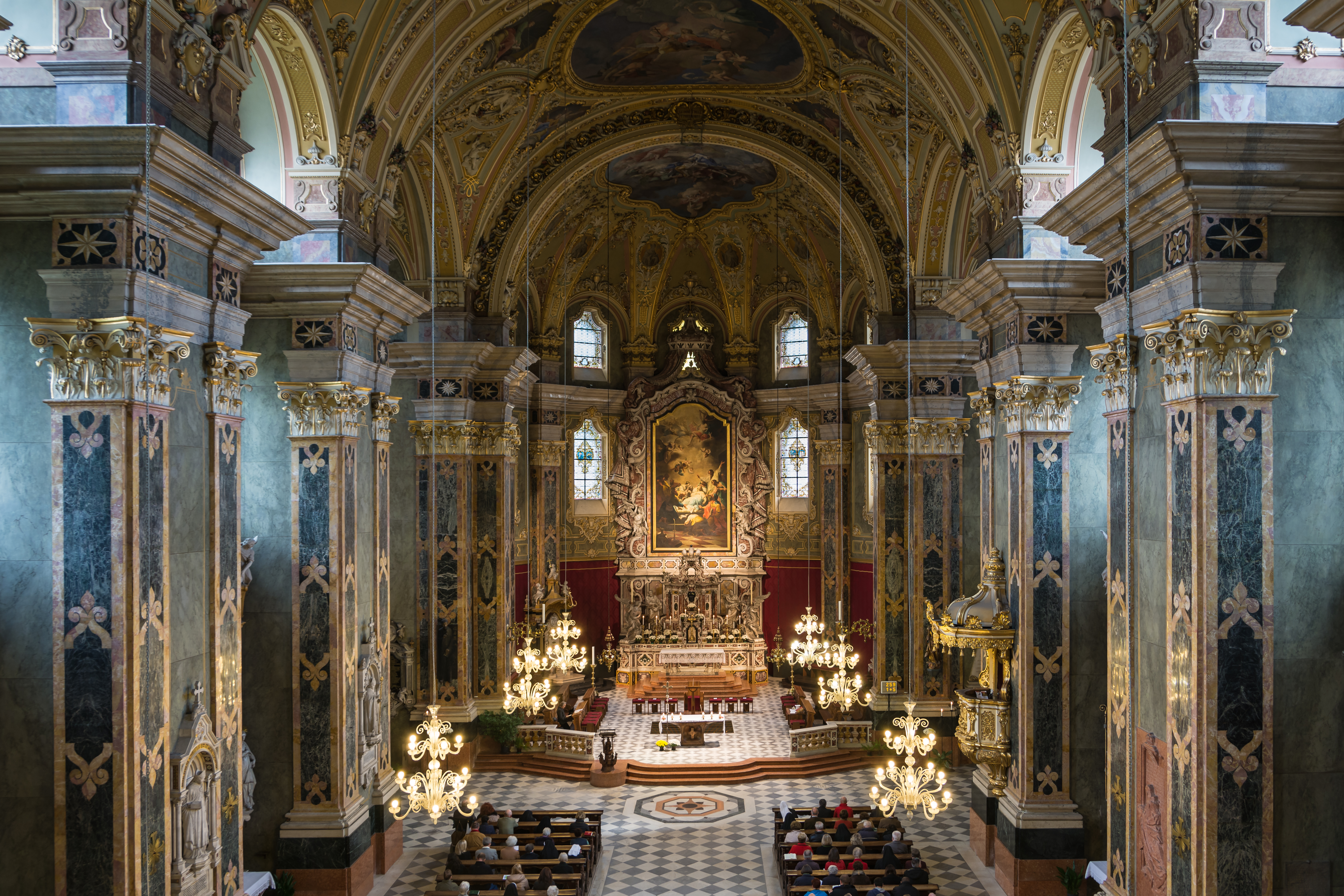
- The original score of this mass was discovered in the archives of the cathedral in Brixen.
- Other name: Spaur Mass
- Catalogue: K. 258
- Composed: 1776: Salzburg
- Movements: 6
- Vocal: SATB choir and soloists
- Instrumental: orchestra; continuo

The Missa brevis No. 7 in C major, K. 258, is a mass composed by Wolfgang Amadeus Mozart in 1776. It is scored for SATB soloists, SATB choir, violin I and II, 2 oboes, 2 clarini (high trumpets), 3 trombones colla parte, timpani and basso continuo.

Although classed as a missa brevis (brief mass), the inclusion of trumpets in the scoring makes it a missa brevis et solemnis.

The autograph manuscript of the mass is preserved in the Berlin State Library.

== Background ==
The mass is often referred to as the Spaur Mass, although this is misleading; Leopold Mozart wrote in 1778 of a mass the family nicknamed the Spaur, as Wolfgang had written it for the consecration of Count Ignaz Joseph von Spaur. However, this could refer to one of many masses, including K. 257, K. 262 and K. 275/272b. The original score of this mass was discovered in the archives of the Cathedral of Brixen in 2007; this provides another link to the Spaur family, some of whom held power in the Bishopric of Brixen.

An alternative nickname, Piccolomini Mass, is speculated to refer to the brevity of the mass; it does not appear to have any connection with the Piccolominis, a Sienese noble family.

This is one of three masses Mozart composed in November and December 1776, all set in C major, including the Credo Mass (K. 257) and the Organ Solo Mass (K. 259).

== Structure ==
The mass is divided into six movements.

1. Kyrie, Allegro, 3/4
2. Gloria, Allegro,
3. Credo, Allegro, 3/4
  "Et incarnatus est", Adagio,
  "Et resurrexit", Allegro, 3/4
4. Sanctus, Andante maestoso,
  "Pleni sunt coeli et terra" Allegro,
5. Benedictus, Allegro,
6. Agnus Dei, Adagio,
