= Mass in G major, K. 49 =

Mozart started composing and writing this song in early mid 1768

Missa brevis in G major
- Mass by W. A. Mozart
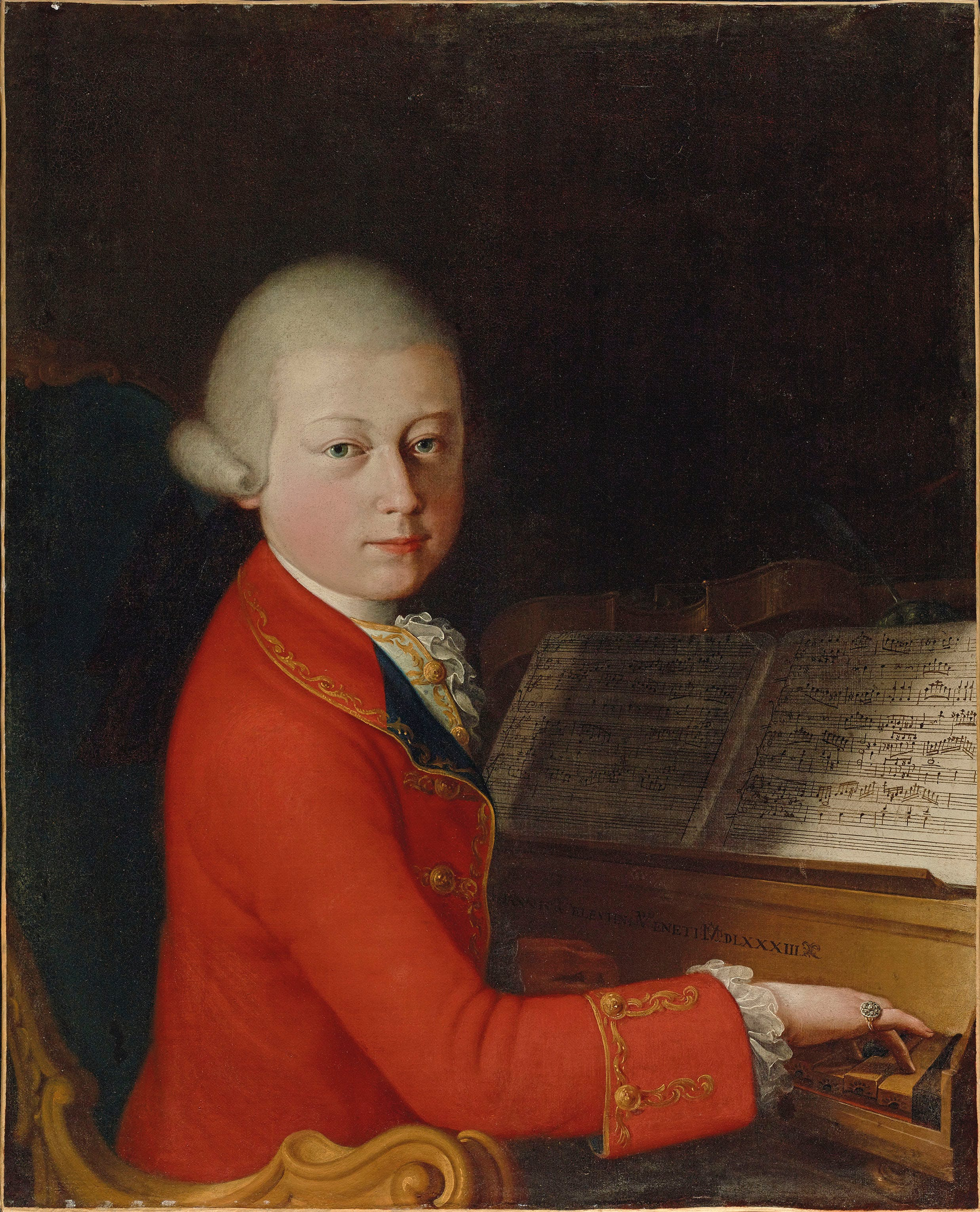
- The composer in 1770
- Key: G major
- Catalogue: K. 49/47d
- Composed: 1768: Salzburg
- Movements: 6
- Vocal: SATB choir and soloists
- Instrumental: two violins; viola; cello; double bass; organ; continuo

Mozart's Mass in G major, K. 49/47d), is his first full mass. It is a missa brevis scored for SATB soloists and choir, violin I and II, viola, and basso continuo.

Mozart wrote the Mass in G major at the age of 12. It was however neither his first setting of a part of the mass ordinary – two years earlier he had already composed a Kyrie (K. 33) —, nor was it his largest composition with a religious theme up to date: his sacred musical play Die Schuldigkeit des ersten Gebots had been premiered in the previous year.

== History ==
Composed in Vienna in the autumn of 1768, this mass is Mozart's only missa brevis to feature a viola part. It is not clear what occasion it was composed for, and it has been confused with the Waisenhausmesse, composed in the same year.

Religious music at the time was increasingly influenced by opera and Baroque embellishments in instrumentation; Mozart's early masses, such as K. 49/47d, have been seen as a return to the more austere settings of the pre-Baroque era.

== Movements ==
The six movements of the mass follow the traditional Order of Mass:

Kyrie Adagio, G major, 4/4

"Kyrie eleison" Andante, G major, 3/4

Gloria Allegro, G major, 4/4
Credo Allegro, G major, 3/4

"Et incarnatus est" Poco adagio, C major, 2/2
"Et resurrexit" Allegro – Adagio – Allegro, G major, 2/2
"Et in Spiritum Sanctum" Andante, C major, 3/4; bass solo
"Et in unam sanctam" Allegro – Adagio – Allegro – Adagio, G major, 2/2 and 3/4
"Et vitam venturi" Allegro, G major, 2/2

Sanctus Andante, G major, 3/4

"Pleni sunt coeli et terra" Allegro, G major, 3/4
"Hosanna in excelsis" Allegro, G major, 4/2

Benedictus Andante, C major, 3/4; soloist quartet

"Hosanna in excelsis" Allegro, G major, 4/2

Agnus Dei Adagio, E minor, 2/2

"Dona nobis pacem" Allegro, G major, 3/8

== Recordings ==
1988: Edith Mathis (soprano), Rosemarie Lang (contralto), Uwe Heilmann (tenor), Jan-Hendrik Rootering (bass) — Rundfunkchor Leipzig, Leipzig Radio Symphony Orchestra, Herbert Kegel — Philips Classics Records (later reissued in 1991 as part of The Complete Mozart Edition, Volume 19 "Missae and Requiem").
