= Mass No. 4 =

Mass No. 4 may refer to:

- Mass No. 4 (Mozart), Dominicus in C major, by Wolfgang Amadeus Mozart
- Mass No. 4 (Schubert), in C major, by Franz Schubert
