= Mass No. 6 =

Mass No. 6 may refer to:

- Mass No. 6 (Haydn), Missa Sancti Nicolai in G major, by Joseph Haydn
- Mass No. 6 (Mozart), in honorem Sanctissimae Trinitatis in C major, by Wolfgang Amadeus Mozart
- Mass No. 6 (Schubert), in E-flat major, by Franz Schubert
