= K167 =

K167 or K-167 may refer to:

- K-167 (Kansas highway), a state highway in Kansas
- Mass in C major, K. 167 "in honorem Sanctissimae Trinitatis"
