= K257 =

K257 or K-257 may refer to:

- K-257 (Kansas highway), a former state highway in Kansas
- Mass in C major, K. 257 "Credo" by Mozart (1776)
