= K259 =

K259 or K-259 may refer to:

- K-259 (Kansas highway), a former state highway in Kansas
- Mass in C major, K. 259 "Organ solo" by Mozart (1776)
