= K66 =

K66 or K-66 may refer to:

- K-66 (Kansas highway), a state highway in the U.S. state of Kansas
- Mass in C major, K. 66 "Dominicus" by W.A. Mozart
- HMS Begonia (K66), a UK Royal Navy Flower-class corvette
