= Mass in C minor =

Mass in C minor may refer to:

- Great Mass in C minor, No. 17, K. 427, by Wolfgang Amadeus Mozart
- Missa solemnis in C minor, "Waisenhaus", No. 4, K. 139, also by Mozart
- Mass in C minor, Op. 147, by Robert Schumann

== See also ==
- Mass in C major (disambiguation)
