= List of masses by Wolfgang Amadeus Mozart =

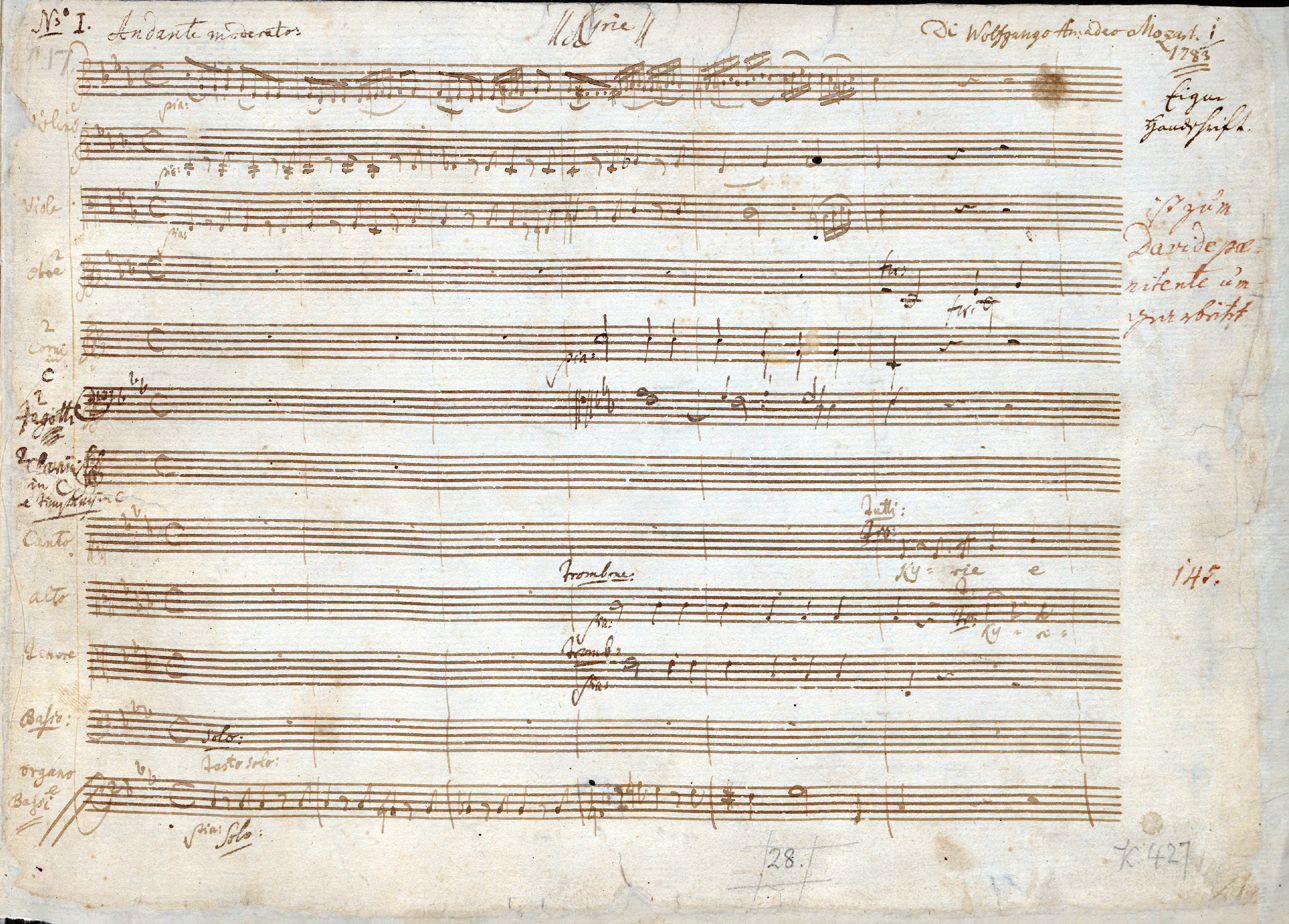
First page of the autograph of Mozart's Great Mass in C minor

Wolfgang Amadeus Mozart (1756–1791) composed several masses and separate movements of the Mass ordinary (such as Kyrie). Mozart composed most of his masses as a church musician in Salzburg:

- Masses for regular Sundays or smaller feasts belonged to the missa brevis type. In the context of Mozart's masses brevis (short) applies primarily to the duration, i.e. the whole mass ceremony took no longer than three quarters of an hour. Instrumentation for such a missa brevis would usually be limited to violins, continuo (which included the organ), and trombones doubling the choral parts of alto, tenor and bass.
- The generic name for longer masses was missa longa, for more solemn and festive occasions. Additional instruments include oboes, trumpets, timpani, and for some of them also natural horns. Instead of treating each part of the mass liturgy in a continuous rendition of the text, there are repeats, fugues, and subdivisions in several movements with separate orchestral introductions.
- Missa longa is usually synonymous with missa solemnis (solemn mass), however in Mozart's Salzburg (due to duration restrictions imposed by Archbishop Colloredo), a hybrid brevis et solemnis (short and solemn) seems to have existed, short in duration, but nonetheless for the more festive occasions, for example including a more elaborate orchestration than the usual missa brevis.

After moving to Vienna, Mozart started to compose the Great Mass in C minor, with a broad orchestration including violas and 12 wind instruments. In 1791, he started writing a Requiem mass, which was unfinished when he died and was first completed by his pupil Franz Xaver Süssmayr.

Most nicknames of the masses were later additions. The attribution to Mozart has been disputed for several masses, most of these spurious works first published by Vincent Novello from 1819.

== Masses and separate parts ==
| Bärenreiter NMA | Breitkopf & Härtel AMA | Novello's edition | Missa brevis No. | Year of composition | Köchel catalogue | Type | Key | Alternative name(s) | Place of composition and notes |
|---|---|---|---|---|---|---|---|---|---|
| Vol. 1/1 No. 1 | Serie I No. 1 | – | 1 | 1768 | K. 49 (47d) | brevis | G major | | Vienna |
| Vol. 1/1 No. 2 | Serie I No. 4 | – | | 1768 | K. 139 (47a) | solemnis (longa) | C minor | Waisenhausmesse; Orphanage Mass | Vienna |
| Vol. 1/1 No. 3 | Serie I No. 2 | – | 2 | 1769 | K. 65 (61a) | brevis | D minor | | Salzburg |
| Vol. 1/1 No. 4 | Serie I No. 3 | – | | 1769 | K. 66 | solemnis (longa) | C major | (Pater) Dominicus (Father) Dominicus | Salzburg |
| Vol. 1/1 No. 5 | – | – | 6 | 1773 | K. 140 (235d, Anh. C1.12) | brevis | G major | Pastoralmesse; Pastoral Mass | attribution uncertain |
| Vol. 1/2 No. 6 | Serie I No. 5 | – | | 1773 | K. 167 | solemnis (longa) | C major | Missa in honorem Sanctissimae Trinitatis; Mass in honour of the Most Holy Trinity; Trinitatismesse | Salzburg |
| Vol. 1/2 No. 7 | Serie I No. 6 | No. 3 | 3 | 1774 | K. 192 (186f) | brevis | F major | Kleine Credo Messe; Little Credo Mass | Salzburg |
| Vol. 1/2 No. 8 | Serie I No. 7 | No. 6 | 4 | 1774 | K. 194 (186h) | brevis | D major | | Salzburg |
| Vol. 1/2 No. 9 | Serie I No. 8 | No. 5 | 5 | 1775–1776 | K. 220 (196b) | brevis et solemnis | C major | Spatzenmesse; Sparrow Mass | Salzburg |
| Vol. 1/2 No. 10 | Serie I No. 12 | – | | 1776 | K. 262 (246a) | longa | C major | Longa | Salzburg |
| Vol. 1/3 No. 11 | Serie I No. 9 | No. 2 | | 1776 | K. 257 | brevis and/or solemnis, longa | C major | Credo; Große Credo-Messe; Great Credo Mass | Salzburg |
| Vol. 1/3 No. 12 | Serie I No. 10 | No. 4 | 7 | 1775 | K. 258 | brevis (et solemnis) | C major | Piccolomini or Spaur Mass (Both nicknames are misleading.) | Salzburg |
| Vol. 1/3 No. 13 | Serie I No. 11 | No. 11 | 8 | 1775 or 1776 | K. 259 | brevis (et solemnis) | C major | Orgelsolo; Organ solo | Salzburg |
| Vol. 1/4 No. 14 | Serie I No. 13 | No. 10 | 9 | 1777 | K. 275 (272b) | brevis | B♭ major | | Salzburg |
| Vol. 1/4 No. 15 | Serie I No. 14 | No. 1 | | 1779 | K. 317 | brevis (or longa) | C major | Krönungsmesse; Coronation Mass | Salzburg "shortest longa" |
| Vol. 1/4 No. 16 | Serie I No. 15 | No. 14 | | 1780 | K. 337 | solemnis (and/or brevis) | C major | Missa solemnis or Hofmesse or Missa aulica i.e. court mass | Salzburg |
| Vol. 1/5 | Serie XXIV No. 29 | – | | 1782–1783 | K. 427 (417a) | solemnis | C minor | Große Messe; Great Mass | Vienna and Salzburg incomplete |
| Vol. 1/6 No. 1 | Serie III No. 1 | | | 1766 | K. 33 | Kyrie | F major | | Paris |
| Vol. 1/6 No. 2 | Serie III No. 2 | | | 1772 | K. 89 (73k) | Kyrie | G major | | contrapuntal study |
| Vol. 1/6 No. 3 | – | | | 1772 | K. 90 | Kyrie | D minor | | contrapuntal study |
| Vol. 1/6 No. 4 | – | | | 1772 | K. 223 (166e) | Hosanna | G major | | contrapuntal study |
| Vol. 1/6 No. 7 | Serie III No. 3 | | | | K. 322 (296a/b/Anh. 12) | Kyrie | E♭ major | | fragment, completed by Maximilian Stadler |
| Vol. 1/6 No. 9 | Serie III No. 4 | | | | K. 323 (Anh. 13) | Kyrie | C major | | fragment, completed by Maximilian Stadler |
| Vol. 1/6 No. 13 | Serie III No. 5 | | | 1780–1781? 1788? | K. 341 (368a) | Kyrie | D minor | | Munich or Vienna? large orchestra |
| Vol. 2/1 | Serie XXIV No. 1 | No. 15 | | 1791 | K. 626 | Requiem | D minor | | Vienna most often published with the completions by Süssmayr |
| | Serie XXIV No. 33 | – | | 1771 (?) | K. 116 (90a) | brevis | F major | | only the Kyrie is complete reattributed to Leopold Mozart |
| | Serie XXIV No. 28 | – | | 1771 (?) | K. 115 (166d) | brevis | C major | | incomplete reattributed to Leopold Mozart |
| – | – | No. 12 | | around 1800? | K. Anh. 232 (Anh. C1.04) | | G major | Twelfth Mass | attributed to Pichl in one source, Wenzel Müller in others |
| – | – | No. 7 | | | K. Anh. 233 | | B♭ major | | attributed to Süssmayr by Mozart's widow |
| – | – | No. 8 | | | K. Anh. 234 (Anh. C1.08) | | C major | | attributed to Franz Gleißner |
| – | – | No. 9 | | | K. Anh. 235 (Anh. C1.09) | | G major | | attributed to Franz Gleißner |
| – | – | No. 13 | | | K. Anh. 186 | | E♭ major | | spurious |
| – | – | No. 16 | | | K. Anh. 186 | | E♭ major | | spurious |
| – | – | No. 17 | | | K. Anh. 185 | | C major | | spurious |
| – | – | No. 18 | | | K. Anh. 237 | Requiem brevis | D major | short Requiem | not by Mozart |

== Sources ==
- Mozart's Masses with an Accompaniment for the Organ, arranged from the full score by Vincent Novello. London: Gallaway, 1819–1824
- The Three Favorite Masses, Composed by Mozart, Haydn, and Beethoven, in Vocal Score, with an Accompaniment for the Organ or Pianoforte, by Vincent Novello. London: Novello, 1850.
- Ludwig Ritter von Köchel. Chronologisch-Thematisches Verzeichniss sämmtlicher Tonwerke Wolfgang Amade Mozarts. Breitkopf & Härtel: Leipzig, 1862. (in German)
