= K220 =

K220 or K-220 may refer to:

- K-220 (Kansas highway), a former state highway in Kansas
- Mass in C major, K. 220 "Sparrow"
