= K258 =

K258 or K-258 may refer to:

- K-258 (Kansas highway), a state highway in Kansas
- Mass in C major, K. 258 "Piccolomini" by Mozart (1776)
