= Mass in C major, K. 220 "Sparrow" =

1775 composition by W. A. Mozart

Missa brevis in C major
- "Sparrow"
- Mass by W. A. Mozart
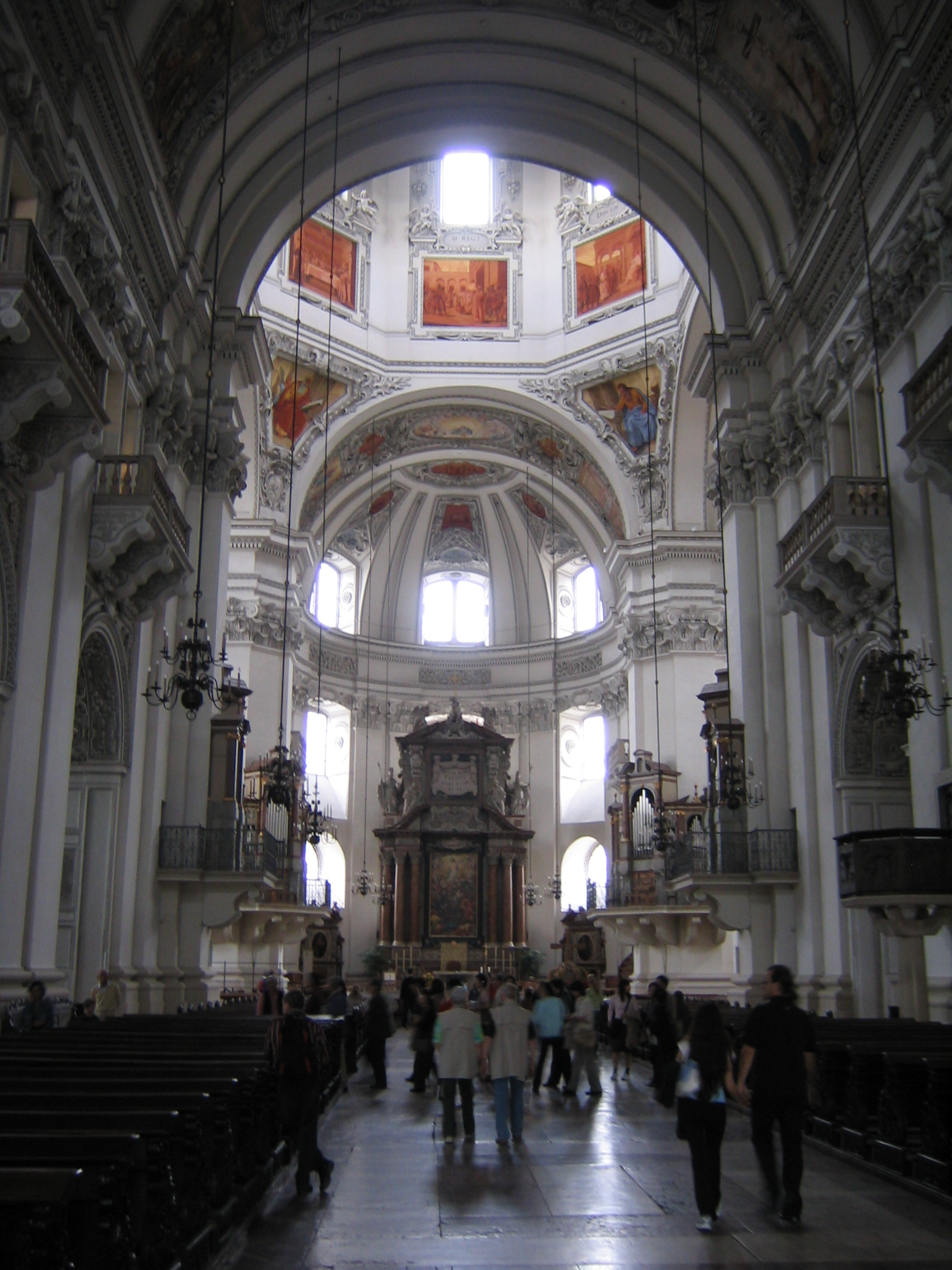
- Salzburg Cathedral may have been the first performance venue of the mass.
- Catalogue: K. 220/196b
- Movements: 6
- Vocal: SATB choir and soloists
- Instrumental: brass; strings; continuo

The Sparrow Mass (German: Spatzenmesse) is a mass in C major K. 220/196b, Mass No. 9, Missa brevis No. 5, composed by Wolfgang Amadeus Mozart in 1775 or 1776 in Salzburg. The mass is sometimes termed a missa brevis et solemnis, because it is short in a simple structure as a missa brevis, but festively scored like a missa solemnis with brass and timpani in addition to four soloists, strings and organ. It was possibly first performed on 7 April 1776 in a mass for Easter at the Salzburg Cathedral. The nickname is derived from violin figures in the Hosanna which resemble bird chirping.

== Background ==
The mass may have been performed on 7 April 1776 during a celebration of Easter at the Salzburg Cathedral. According to a letter by Mozart, a copy was possibly loaned to the Heiligenkreuz Monastery the following year. The mass got the nickname Spatzenmesse (Sparrow Mass) on account of "the violin figures in the Hosanna" of the Sanctus, repeated after the Benedictus, which "recall the chirping of birds."

The Sparrow Mass is one of a series of five masses Mozart composed in 1775–1776 (or possibly 1775–1777), all of them with clarini trumpets, and so in the "trumpet key" of C major. Karl Geiringer notes that K. 220 was one of the models Franz Xaver Süssmayr used when completing Mozart's Requiem.

== Structure and scoring ==
The composition is short in duration as a missa brevis. Mozart does not even include the fugal conclusions to the Gloria and the Credo normally expected. It is richly orchestrated as a missa solemnis, for four soloists (soprano, contralto, tenor, bass), a four-part choir (SATB), two trumpets, three trombones, timpani, strings and organ, the latter supplying figured bass for most of the duration. The mass is therefore sometimes termed a missa brevis et solemnis.

The setting of the Latin Order of Mass is structured in six movements. In the following table of the movements, the voices, markings, keys and time signatures are taken from the choral score.

No.	Part	Incipit	Vocal	Marking	Key	Time
1	Kyrie	Kyrie	SATB	Allegro	C major	common time
2	Gloria	Gloria	SATB + soloists	Allegro	C major	3/4
3	Credo	Credo	SATB + soloists	Allegro	C major	common time
3	Credo	Et incarnatus est	SATB	Andante	C major	common time
3	Credo	Et resurrexit	SATB	Allegro	C major	common time
4	Sanctus	Sanctus	SATB	Andante	C major	3/4
4	Sanctus	Pleni sunt coeli	SATB	Allegro	C major	common time
4	Sanctus	Osanna	SATB	Allegro	C major	common time
5	Benedictus	Benedictus	soloists	Andante	G major	common time
5	Benedictus	Osanna	SATB	Allegro	C major	common time
6	Agnus Dei	Agnus Dei	SATB + soloists	Adagio	C major	3/4
6	Agnus Dei	Dona nobis pacem	SATB	Allegro	C major	common time

Following the example of Joseph Haydn (such as in the Missa Sancti Nicolai) and Michael Haydn, Mozart in this mass recalls the music of the "Kyrie" in the "Dona nobis", something which Franz Xaver Süssmayr did in his completion of Mozart's Requiem. The Requiem contains an almost literal quotation from this mass in the Requiem aeternam.
