= Mass in C major, K. 259 "Organ solo" =

1776 composition by W. A. Mozart

Missa brevis in C major
- "Organ Solo"
- Mass by W. A. Mozart
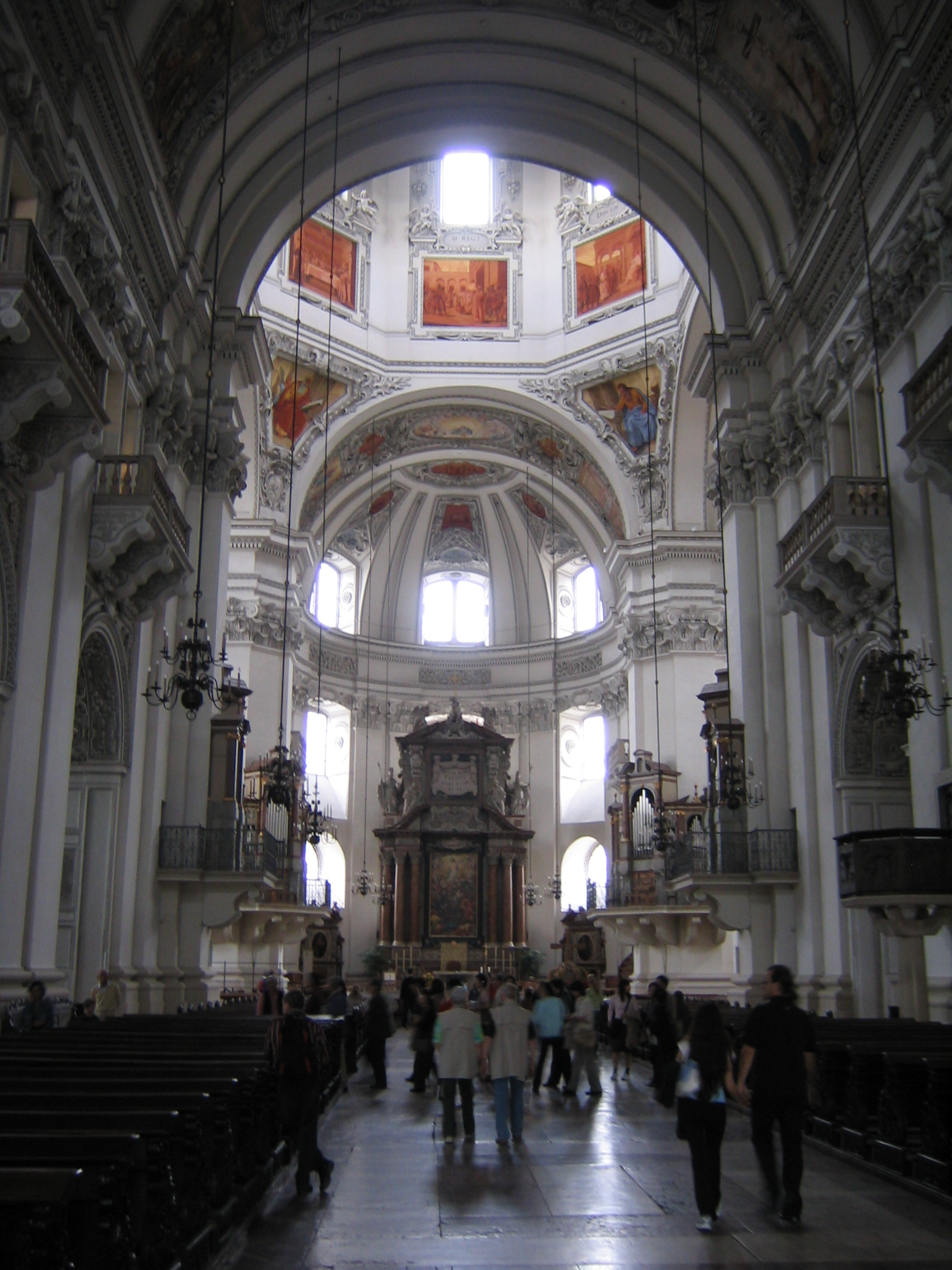
- Salzburg Cathedral may have been the first performance venue of the mass.
- Key: C major
- Catalogue: K. 259
- Composed: 1776: Salzburg
- Movements: 6
- Vocal: SATB choir and soloists
- Instrumental: orchestra; continuo

The Missa brevis No. 8 in C major, K. 259, is a mass composed by Wolfgang Amadeus Mozart in 1776. It is scored for SATB soloists, SATB choir, violin I and II, 2 oboes, 2 clarini (high trumpets), 3 trombones colla parte, timpani and basso continuo.

Although classed as a missa brevis (brief mass), the inclusion of trumpets in the scoring makes it a missa brevis et solemnis. The mass derives its nickname Orgelmesse or Orgelsolomesse (Organ Solo Mass) from the obbligato organ solo entry of the Benedictus. This is one of three masses Mozart composed in November and December 1776, all set in C major, including the Credo Mass (K. 257) and the Piccolomini Mass (K. 258).

The autograph manuscript of the mass is preserved in the Berlin State Library.

The work consists of six movements. Performances require approximately 10–15 minutes.

1. Kyrie Andante, C major,
2. Gloria Allegro, C major, 3/4
3. Credo Allegro, C major,
4. Sanctus Adagio maestoso, C major, 3/4
  "Pleni sunt coeli et terra" Allegro, C major,
5. Benedictus Allegro vivace, G major, 3/4
  "Hosanna in excelsis" Allegro, C major, 3/4
6. Agnus Dei Adagio, C major,
  "Dona nobis pacem" Allegro, C major, 3/4
