= Mass in F major, K. 192 =

Mozart published this piece in the late 1780s

Missa brevis in F major
- Mass by W. A. Mozart
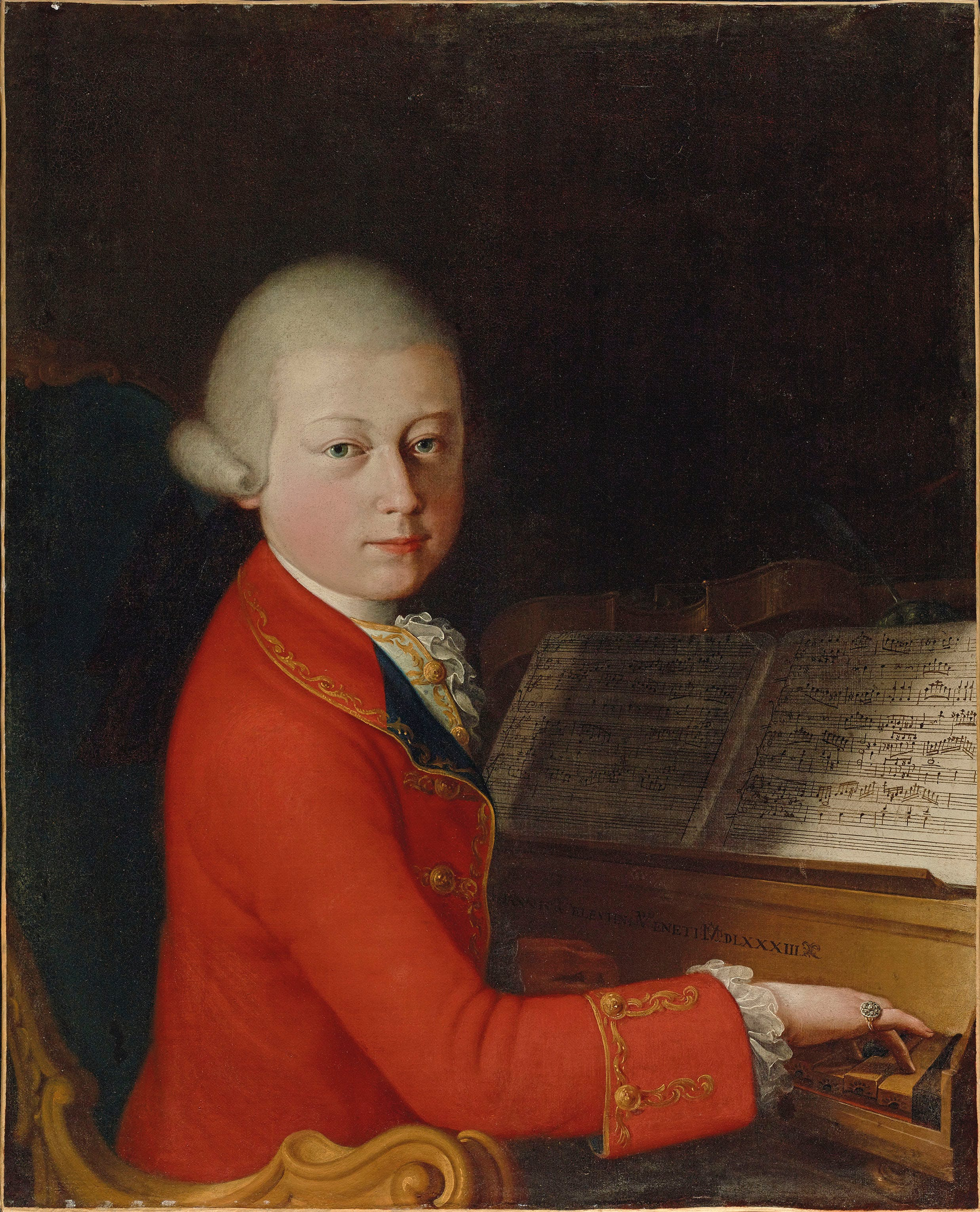
- 1770 Verona portrait of Mozart
- Key: F major
- Catalogue: K. 192/186f
- Composed: 1774: Salzburg
- Movements: 6
- Vocal: SATB choir and soloists
- Instrumental: orchestra and organ

Wolfgang Amadeus Mozart's Missa brevis in F major, K. 192 (186f), was completed in Salzburg, on 24 June 1774. It is scored for SATB soloists, SATB choir, two trumpets (which Mozart added later), three trombones, two violins, and an organ. AMA I/1 No. 6, NMA I:1/1/ii

The Credo of this mass features the "Do-Re-Fa-Mi" motif from the hymn Lucis creator, which Mozart later used as the main theme to the final of his Jupiter Symphony. Due to its repetition of this theme, it is classed as a Credo Mass and is often known as the Kleine (small) Credo Mass to distinguish it from the Great Credo Mass, K. 257.

Motif of the Credo
