= Mass in C major, K. 257 "Credo" =

Missa in C major
- "Credo"
- Mass by W. A. Mozart
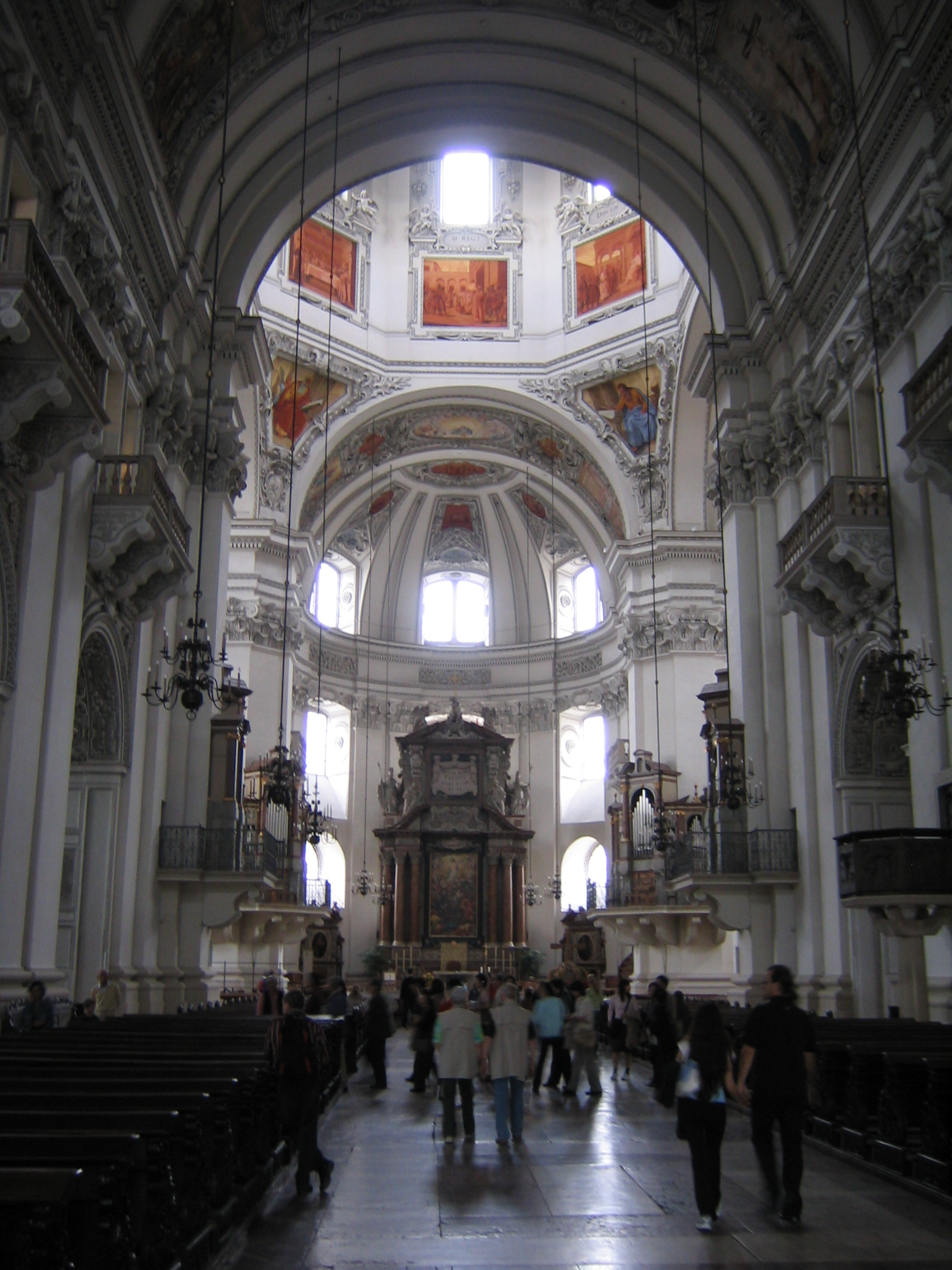
- Salzburg Cathedral may have been the first performance venue of the mass.
- Catalogue: K. 257
- Composed: 1776: Salzburg
- Movements: 6
- Vocal: SATB choir and soloists
- Instrumental: brass; strings; timpani; continuo

The Credo Mass in C major, K. 257, is a mass composed by Wolfgang Amadeus Mozart in 1776. It is scored for SATB soloists, SATB choir, violin I and II, 2 oboes, 2 clarini (high trumpets), 3 trombones colla parte, timpani and basso continuo.

The Credo Mass has been classified as either a missa solemnis, a missa brevis or a missa brevis et solemnis – its performance time of approximately 25 minutes makes it difficult to categorise in a definitive manner. Its name derives from the long setting of the Credo, in which the word "Credo" is repeatedly sung in a two-note motif. It thus joins a tradition of so-called "Credo Masses", including Mozart's own Kleine Credo Messe (K. 192) and Beethoven's later Missa solemnis. The first performance was in Salzburg in November 1776. This is one of three masses Mozart composed in November and December 1776, all set in C major, including the Piccolominimesse (K. 258) and the Organ Solo Mass (K. 259).

The work consists of six movements.

1. Kyrie Andante maestoso, C major, 3/4
  "Kyrie eleison" Allegro, C major,
2. Gloria Allegro assai, C major,
3. Credo Molto allegro, C major, 3/4
  "Et incarnatus est" Andante, C major, 6/8
  "[Credo, credo] Et resurrexit..." Molto allegro, C major, 3/4
4. Sanctus Allegretto, C major,
  "Hosanna in excelsis" Molto allegro, C major,
5. Benedictus Allegro, F major,
  "Hosanna in excelsis" Molto allegro, C major,
6. Agnus Dei Andante maestoso, C major, 3/4
  "Dona nobis pacem" Allegro vivace, C major,
