= Mass in B-flat major, K. 275 =

Composition by Wolfgang Amadeus Mozart

Missa brevis in B-flat major
- Mass by W. A. Mozart
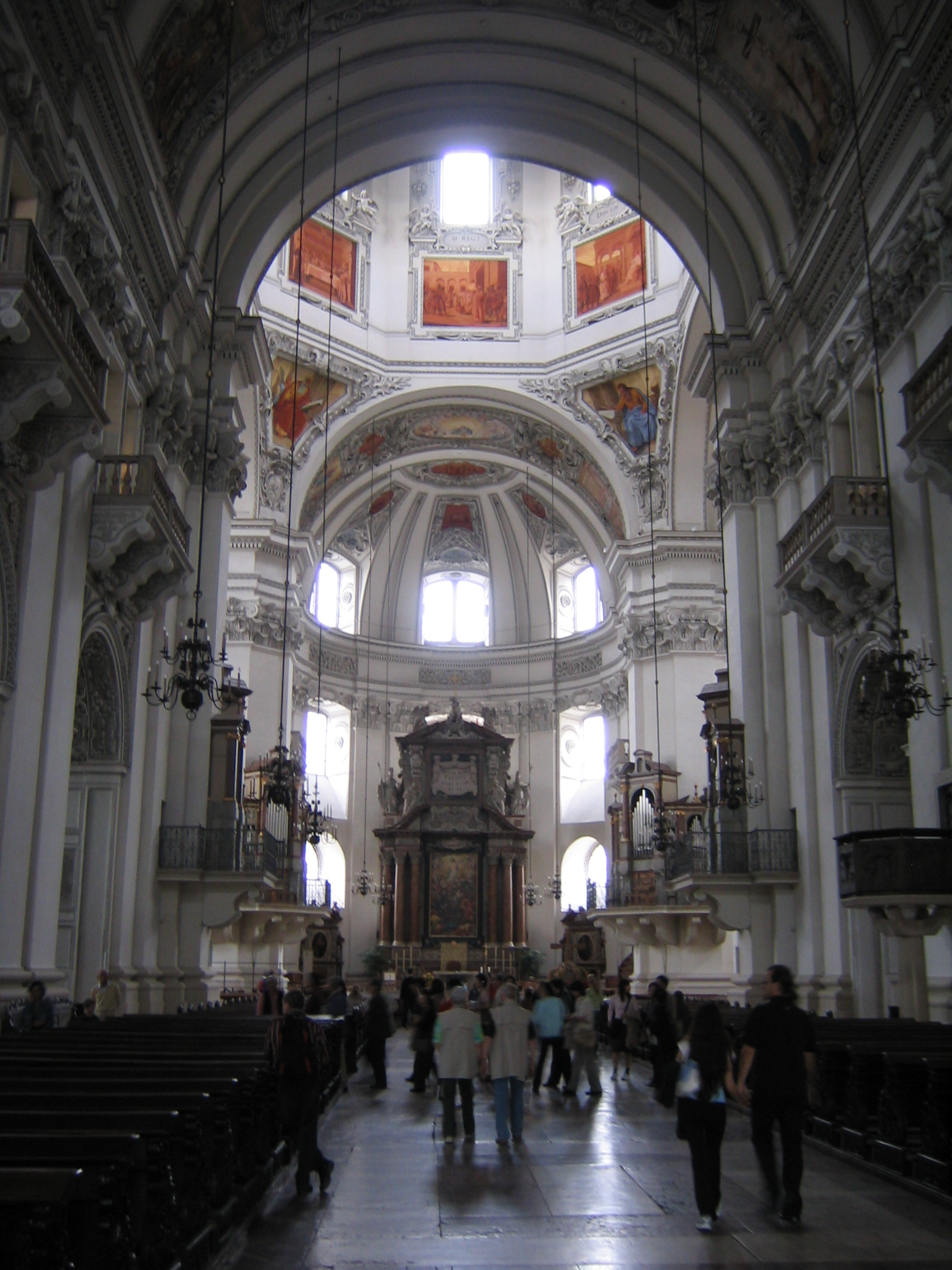
- Salzburg Cathedral may have been the first performance venue of the mass.
- Catalogue: K. 275/272b
- Composed: 1777: Salzburg
- Movements: 6
- Vocal: SATB choir and soloists
- Instrumental: brass; strings; continuo

The Missa brevis No. 9 in B♭ major by Wolfgang Amadeus Mozart, K. 275/272b, was probably written before September 1777 for Salzburg. The mass is scored for SATB soloists, SATB choir, violin I, violin II, 3 trombones, string bass, and organ.

The setting is divided into six movements.

1. Kyrie Allegro, B♭ major, 4/4
2. Gloria Allegro, B♭ major, 2/4
3. Credo Allegro, B♭ major, 4/4
  "Et incarnatus est" Adagio
  "Et resurrexit" Allegro
4. Sanctus Andante, B♭ major, 3/4
5. Benedictus Andante, E♭ major, 3/4
  "Osanna in excelsis" Allegro, B♭ major
6. Agnus Dei Andante, G minor, 4/4
  "Dona nobis pacem" Allegro, B♭ major, 2/2

In the Gloria and the Credo, Mozart eschews the traditional concluding fugues. Despite being a missa brevis, the Agnus Dei is very long and there is "a prolonged setting for soloists and choir of 'Dona nobis pacem', ending piano." The Dona nobis is set as a gavotte, "like a vaudeville and has been compared with the specimen of this genre at the end of Die Entführung aus dem Serail."

The first known performance took place on December 21, 1777, with castrato Francesco Ceccarelli among the soloists singled out for praise for his performance, but David Schildkret has argued that it was more likely composed as early as 1772. Elsewhere church musicians were offended, such as those at Wasserburg am Inn, who found Mozart's setting "an open mockery of the holy text."
