= France Ačko =

France Ačko (July 23, 1904 in Maribor – December 30, 1974 in Ljubljana) was a Slovenian musician, organist and composer of sacred music. He studied music with Srečko Koporc and in Rome at the Pontifical Institute of Sacred Music. His most important works include a Missa Solemnis (1941) and Počivaj, Milo Detece (Sleep, Little Baby).
