= Francesco Ceccarelli =

Italian opera singer

Francesco Ceccarelli (1752, in Foligno – 21 September 1814, in Dresden) was a castrato soprano known for his grace and excellent singing technique.

After early opera appearances in his native Umbria, he sang mainly in the German-speaking countries and was thought better suited to church and concert music.

He was notably engaged by Count Hieronymus von Colloredo as a court singer at Salzburg (1777–88), where he became a friend of the Mozart family; Mozart wrote a mass, K275/272b, and a rondò, K374, for him. At the premiere on 21 December 1777 of Wolfgang Amadeus Mozart's Missa Brevis, K. 272b, Ceccarelli was among the soloists singled out for praise for his performance. Around 1780, Mozart revised "Exsultate, jubilate," possibly for Ceccarelli to sing at the Dreifaltigkeitskirche.

Later, Ceccarelli held posts at Mainz (1788–92) and sang in opera in Italy. In decline, he served the Elector of Saxony in Dresden from 1800.
