= Mass in C major, K. 337 "Solemnis" =

Missa solemnis in C major
- "Missa aulica"
- Mass by W. A. Mozart
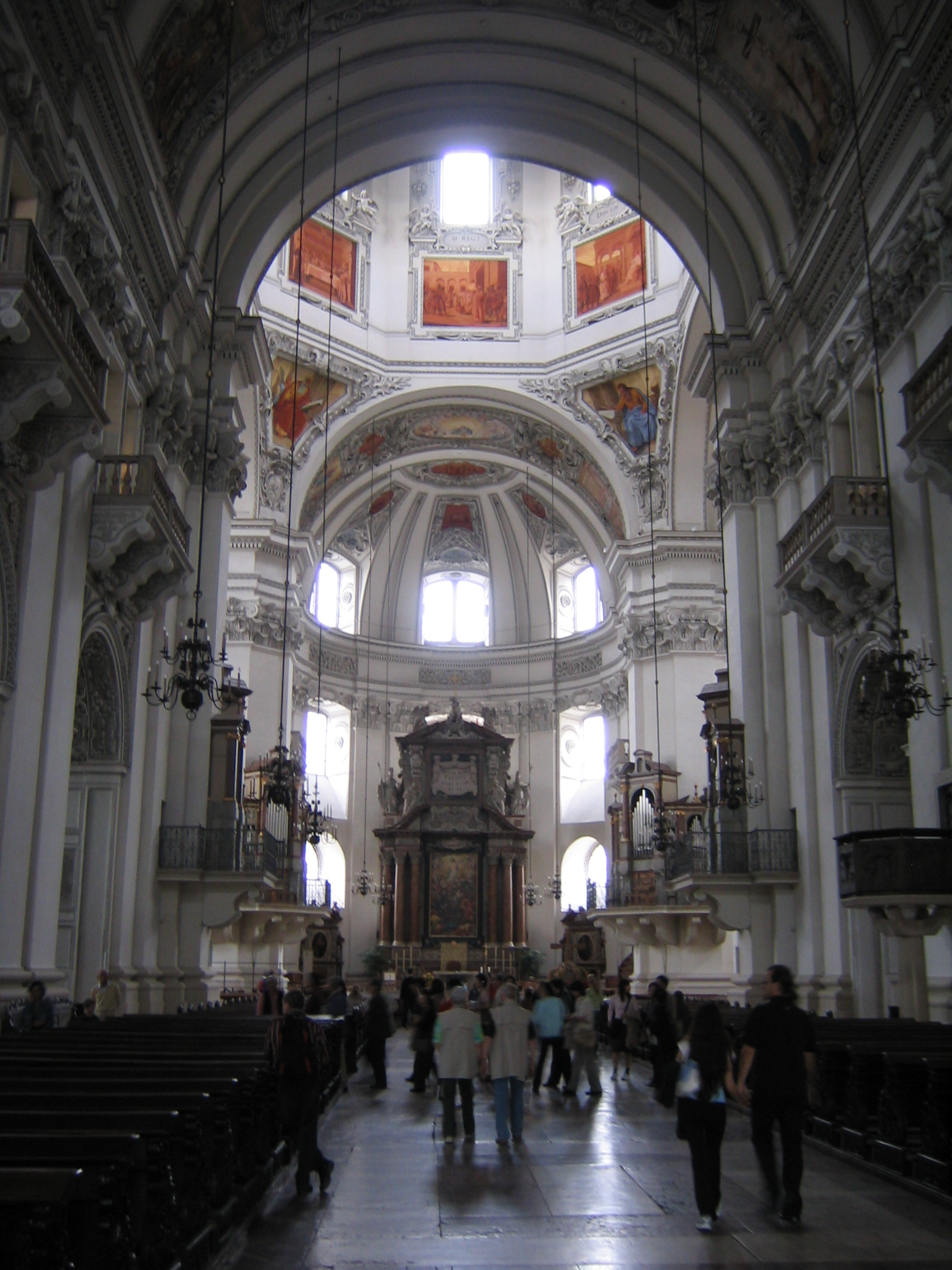
- Salzburg Cathedral may have been the first performance venue of the mass.
- Catalogue: K. 337
- Composed: 1780: Salzburg
- Movements: 6
- Vocal: SATB choir and soloists
- Instrumental: orchestra; organ

The Missa solemnis in C major by Wolfgang Amadeus Mozart, K. 337, was written in 1780 for Salzburg. It was Mozart's last complete mass. The mass is scored for soloists, choir, 2 oboes, 2 bassoons, 2 trumpets, 3 trombones, strings (without violas) and organ, the latter supplying figured bass for most of the duration.

== Structure ==
The setting is divided into six movements:

1. Kyrie
2. Gloria
3. Credo
4. Sanctus
5. Benedictus
6. Agnus Dei

The Sanctus recalls features of the Kyrie, and also has a violin figure Mozart used again in Idomeneo. The Benedictus is peculiar for Mozart's mass settings in that it is an austere fugue in an archaic style.

== Fragmentary first Credo setting and its completion ==
The autograph of the mass features an alternative setting of the Credo. This setting has a length of 136 measures and abruptly ends after the words "cuius regni non erit finis". It is not clear why Mozart stopped work on this setting and instead began work on the second – and complete – setting of the Credo on the next page of the autograph, but this may be due to the fact that Mozart had forgotten to set the words "sub Pontio Pilato" to music in the first draft. In the years 1989 and 2003 Dr Murl Sickbert completed the fragment; in 2006 it was performed at Hardin–Simmons University, Texas.
