= Kyrie in F major, K. 33 =

1766 composition by Wolfgang Amadeus Mozart

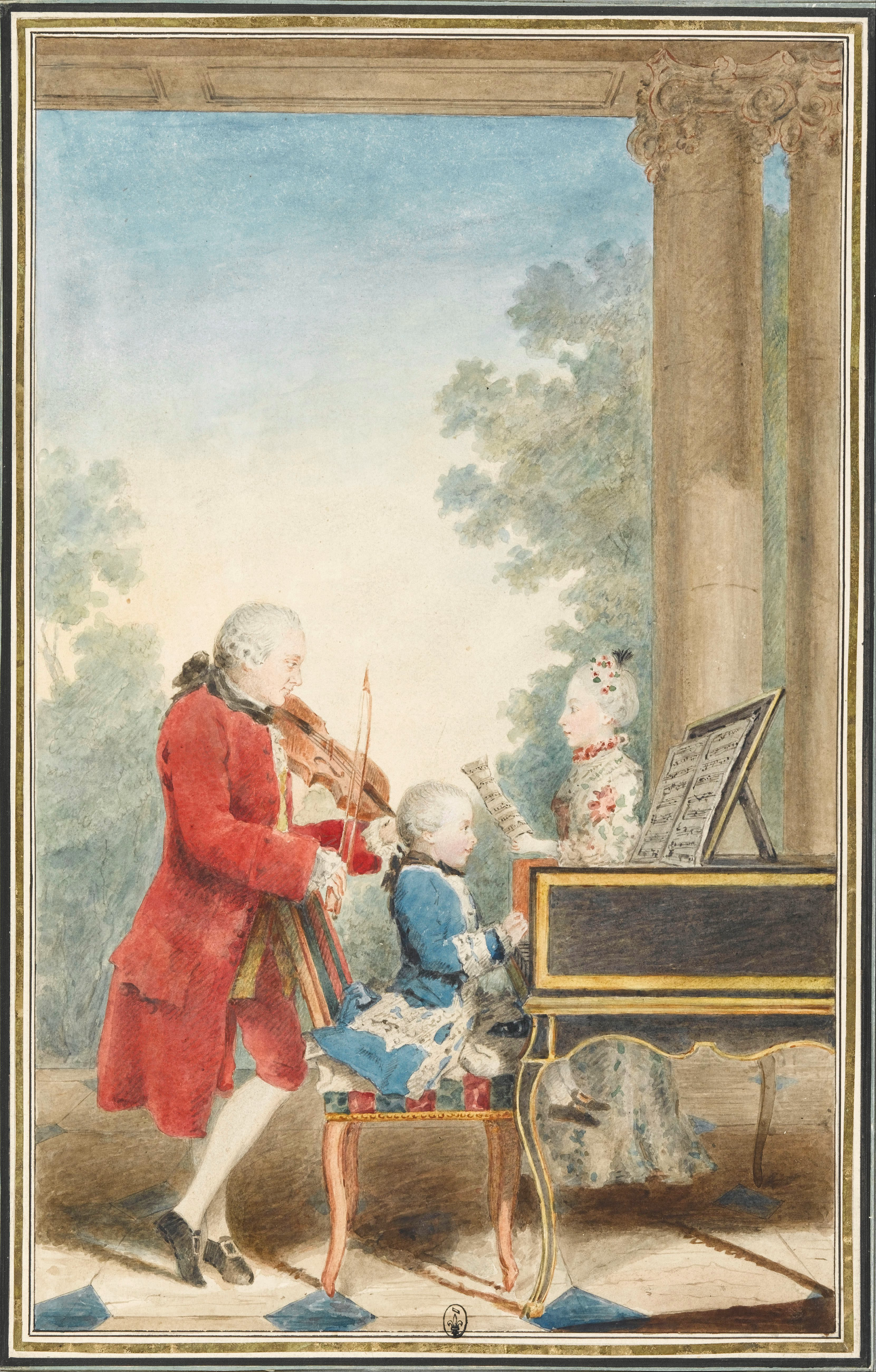
Carmontelle's 1763–64 Mozart family portrait

The Kyrie in F major, K. 33, is a sacred composition for choir and strings by a ten-year-old Wolfgang Amadeus Mozart, dated June 12, 1766. It was written while the composer was in Paris with his family, with the intent to promote his image as a child prodigy.

The piece shows the influence of Johann Schobert and French church music. It is based upon a French song. The piece is about nine minutes long. The manuscript shows that Mozart's father edited the piece. In the piece, the alto voice is supported by the first violin, the soprano by the second, the viola reinforces the tenor and occasionally the alto. At times, the first violin unites with the canto, in order that the leading highest part may stand out more clearly. The support of the alto voice by the highest stringed instrument, mostly in the higher octave, makes the alto stand out clearly in the harmony against the soprano.

During his stay in Paris, Mozart was also able to perform concerts at the court of Louis XV due to the influence of the German writer Friedrich Melchior von Grimm.

== See also ==
- List of masses by Wolfgang Amadeus Mozart
