= Mass in C major, K. 262 "Missa longa" =

1776 mass by W. A. Mozart

Missa longa in C major
- Mass by W. A. Mozart
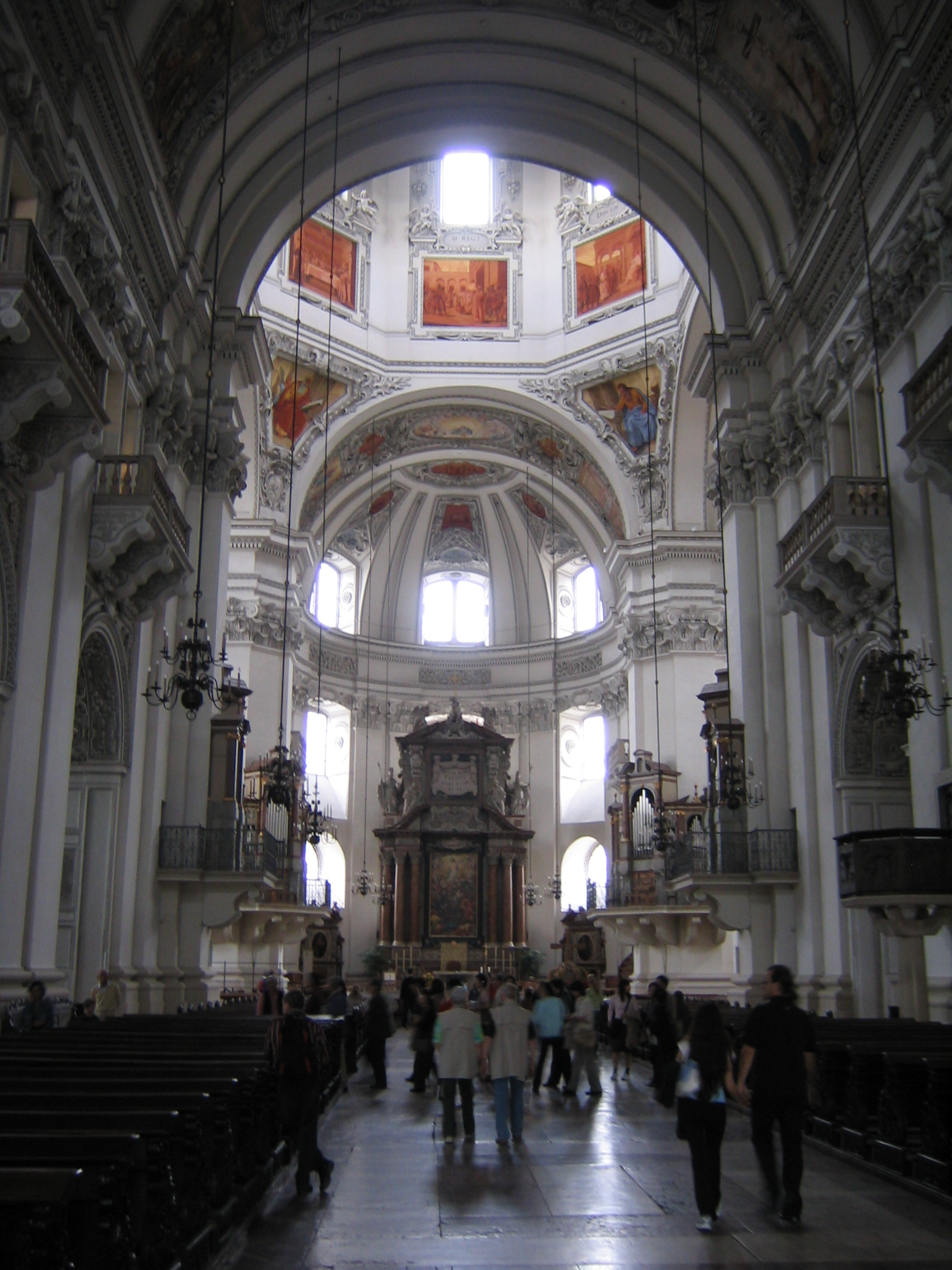
- Salzburg Cathedral may have been the first performance venue of the mass.
- Catalogue: K. 262/246a
- Composed: 1775: Salzburg
- Movements: 6
- Vocal: SATB choir and soloists
- Instrumental: orchestra; continuo

The Missa longa in C major, K. 262/246a, is a mass composed by Wolfgang Amadeus Mozart in May 1776. Other sources claim it was composed in May 1775. It is scored for SATB soloists, SATB choir, violins I and II, 2 oboes, 2 horns in C, 2 clarini (high trumpets) in C, 3 trombones colla parte, timpani and basso continuo.

The mass is classed as a missa longa due to its length. However, due to its lack of extended writing for the solo parts, it has also been categorised as a missa brevis. The occasion the mass was composed for remains debatable. It may have been composed at the Archbishop Colloredo's request for a special occasion at the Salzburg Cathedral, or at the directive of a different priest – Colloredo's preference for brief settings makes it unlikely that he would have approved of the missa longa. Alternatively, it may have been composed for performance at St Peter's Church.

The mass is divided into six movements.

1. Kyrie Allegro, C major,
2. Gloria Allegro con spiritu, C major,
  "Qui tollis peccata mundi" Andante, G minor, 3/4
  "Quoniam tu solus Sanctus" Allegro con spiritu, C major,
3. Credo Allegro, C major, 3/4
  "Et incarnatus est" Adagio ma non troppo, C major,
  "Et resurrexit" Molto allegro, C major,
  "Et in Spiritum Sanctum Dominum" Allegro, G major, 3/4
  "Et unam sanctam" Allegro, C major, 3/4
  "Et expecto resurrectionem" Adagio, C major,
  "Et vitam venturi saeculi" Allegro, C major,
4. Sanctus Andantino, C major, 3/4
5. Benedictus Andantino, F major, 3/4
6. Agnus Dei Andante, C major,
  "Dona nobis pacem" Allegro, C major,
