= Franz Gleißner =

German lithographer and composer (1759–1818)

Franz Johannes Gleißner (1759 – 18 September 1818) was a German lithographer and composer. In the late 18th century, he met Alois Senefelder, with whom he collaborated for approximately 30 years using lithography as a method of reproduction to print music scores. Using the songs composed by Gleißner, Senefelder demonstrated that lithography could be successfully used for music publication.

Gleißner's compositions include masses, the oratorio Lazarus, about thirteen symphonies, much chamber music, and some stage works.

In 1803, Gleißner made a catalog of Wolfgang Amadeus Mozart's manuscripts in Constanze's estate.
