= Mass in C major, K. 167 "in honorem Sanctissimae Trinitatis" =

1773 composition by W. A. Mozart

Missa solemnis in C major
- "in honorem Sanctissimae Trinitatis"
- Mass by W. A. Mozart
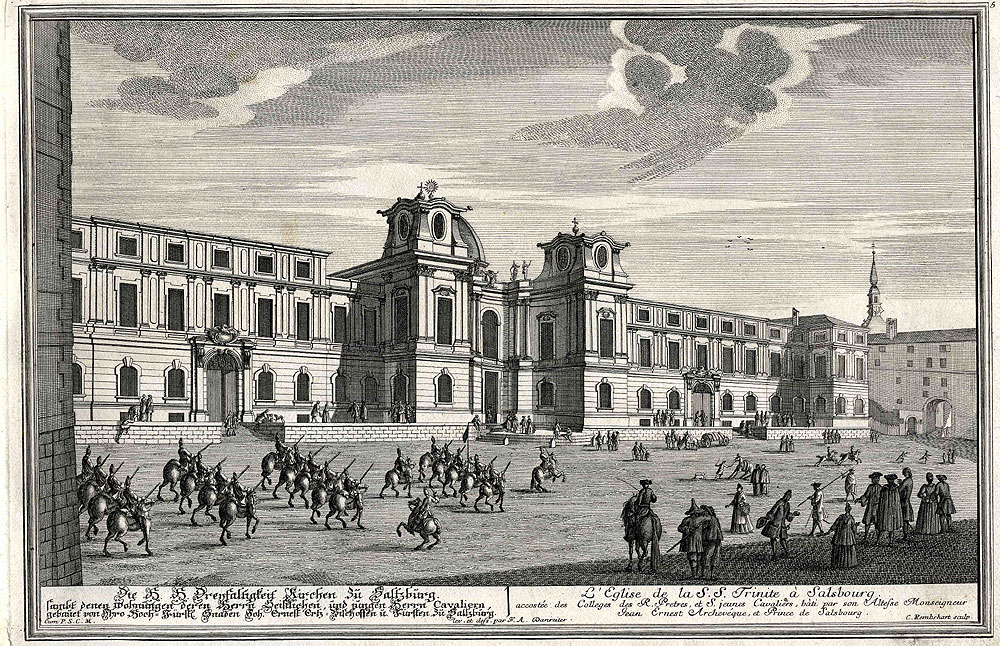
- Holy Trinity Church, Salzburg, engraving, c. 1735
- Key: C major
- Catalogue: K. 167
- Composed: 1773: Salzburg
- Movements: 6
- Vocal: SATB choir
- Instrumental: orchestra

The Missa in honorem Sanctissimae Trinitatis in C major, K. 167, is a mass composed by Wolfgang Amadeus Mozart in June 1773. It is scored for SATB choir, violin I and II, 2 oboes, 2 clarini (high trumpets), 2 trumpets, timpani and basso continuo.

A solemn mass, its name ("in honour of the Most Holy Trinity") and date indicate that it was likely to have been composed for Trinity Sunday, for use in the Holy Trinity Church, Salzburg. The mass is Mozart's only wholly choral mass setting, excluding all solo vocalists. Alfred Einstein contends that this may have been done in order to achieve brevity, following the directive of Archbishop Colloredo.

The work consists of six movements. Performances take 25 to 30 minutes.

1. Kyrie Allegro, C major,
2. Gloria Allegro, C major, 3/4
3. Credo Allegro, C major,
  "Et incarnatus est" Adagio, C major,
  "Et resurrexit" Allegro, C major,
  "Et in Spiritum Sanctum" Allegro, G major, 3/4
  "Et unam sanctam" Allegro, C major,
  "Et vitam venturi saeculi" Alla breve, C major,
4. Sanctus Andante, C major, 3/4
  "Hosanna in excelsis" Allegro, C major,
5. Benedictus Allegro, F major,
  "Hosanna in excelsis" Allegro, C major,
6. Agnus Dei Adagio, C major, 3/4
  "Dona nobis pacem" Allegro moderato, C major,
