= Mass in C major, K. 66 "Dominicus" =

1769 mass by W. A. Mozart

Missa solemnis in C major
- "Dominicus"
- Mass by W. A. Mozart
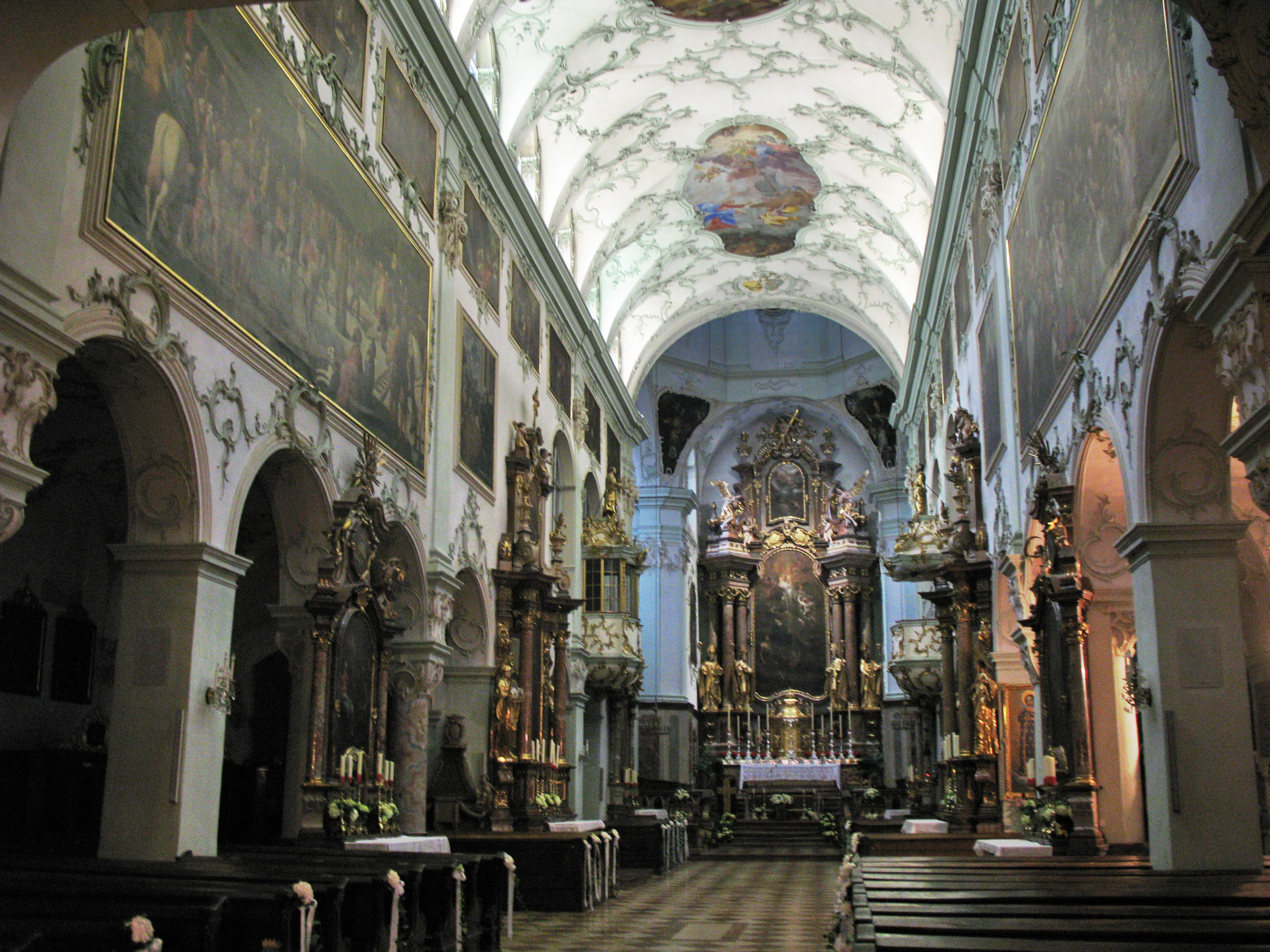
- Interior of St Peter's Abbey, Salzburg
- Key: C major
- Catalogue: K. 66
- Occasion: Ordination of Cajetan Hagenauer as Pater Dominicus
- Composed: 15 October 1769: Salzburg
- Movements: 6
- Vocal: SATB choir and soloists
- Instrumental: Orchestra

The Missa solemnis in C major, K. 66, is a mass composed by Wolfgang Amadeus Mozart in 1769 at the age of thirteen. It is scored for SATB soloists and choir, violins I and II, viola, 2 oboes, 2 horns, 2 clarini (high trumpets), 2 trumpets and basso continuo.

Mozart composed the mass for the ordination of Cajetan Hagenauer, son of Lorenz Hagenauer, the Mozarts' landlord and family friend. Cajetan had entered St Peter's Abbey, a Benedictine monastery, whilst the Mozarts were on their grand tour. When he became a priest in 1769, he took the name Pater Dominicus and celebrated his first solemn high mass; this gives the work its nickname, Dominicusmesse. Leopold Mozart conducted the première on 15 October to a packed church in Salzburg; it is thought that the success of this performance led to Wolfgang's first Italian tour.

Due to its length, the mass is classified as a missa solemnis. It is divided into six movements.

1. Kyrie Adagio, C major,
  "Kyrie eleison" Allegro, C major, 3/4
2. Gloria Allegro moderato, C major, 3/4
  "Laudamus te" Andante grazioso, F major, 2/4; soprano/alto duet
  "Gratias agimus tibi" Adagio, C major,
  "Propter magnam gloriam tuam" Allegro, C major,
  "Domine Deus" Un poco andante, G major, 3/4; tenor solo
  "Qui tollis peccata mundi" Un poco adagio, G minor,
  "Quoniam tu" Andante ma un poco allegro, F major, 3/4; soprano solo
  "Cum Sancto Spiritu" Alla breve, C major,
3. Credo Molto allegro, C major,
  "Et incarnatus est" Adagio, F major, 3/4; soloists
  "Crucifixus" Adagio, C minor,
  "Et resurrexit" Molto allegro, C major,
  "Et in Spiritum Sanctum Dominum" Andante, G major, 3/4; soprano solo
  "Et in unam sanctam" Moderato, C major,
  "Et vitam venturi saeculi" Allegro, C major, 3/4
4. Sanctus Adagio, C major,
  "Pleni sunt coeli et terra" Allegro, C major, 3/4
  "Hosanna in excelsis" Moderato, C major,
5. Benedictus Allegro moderato, G major,; soloists
  "Hosanna in excelsis" Moderato, C major,
6. Agnus Dei Allegro moderato, C major,
  "Dona nobis pacem" Allegro, C major, 3/8

== Recordings ==
- 1989 – Edith Mathis (soprano), Rosemarie Lang (contralto), Uwe Heilmann (tenor), Jan-Hendrik Rootering (bass) – Rundfunkchor Leipzig, Radio-Sinfonie-Orchester Leipzig, Herbert Kegel – CD Philips. This recording was used in volume 19 (Missae/Requiem) of The Complete Mozart Edition. During the 1980s, Kegel recorded Mozart's complete large-scale religious music (i.e. masses, missae breves, offertoriums etc.) for Philips.
