= Mass in C minor, K. 139 "Waisenhaus" =

1768 mass by W. A. Mozart

Missa solemnis in C minor
- "Waisenhaus"
- Mass by W. A. Mozart
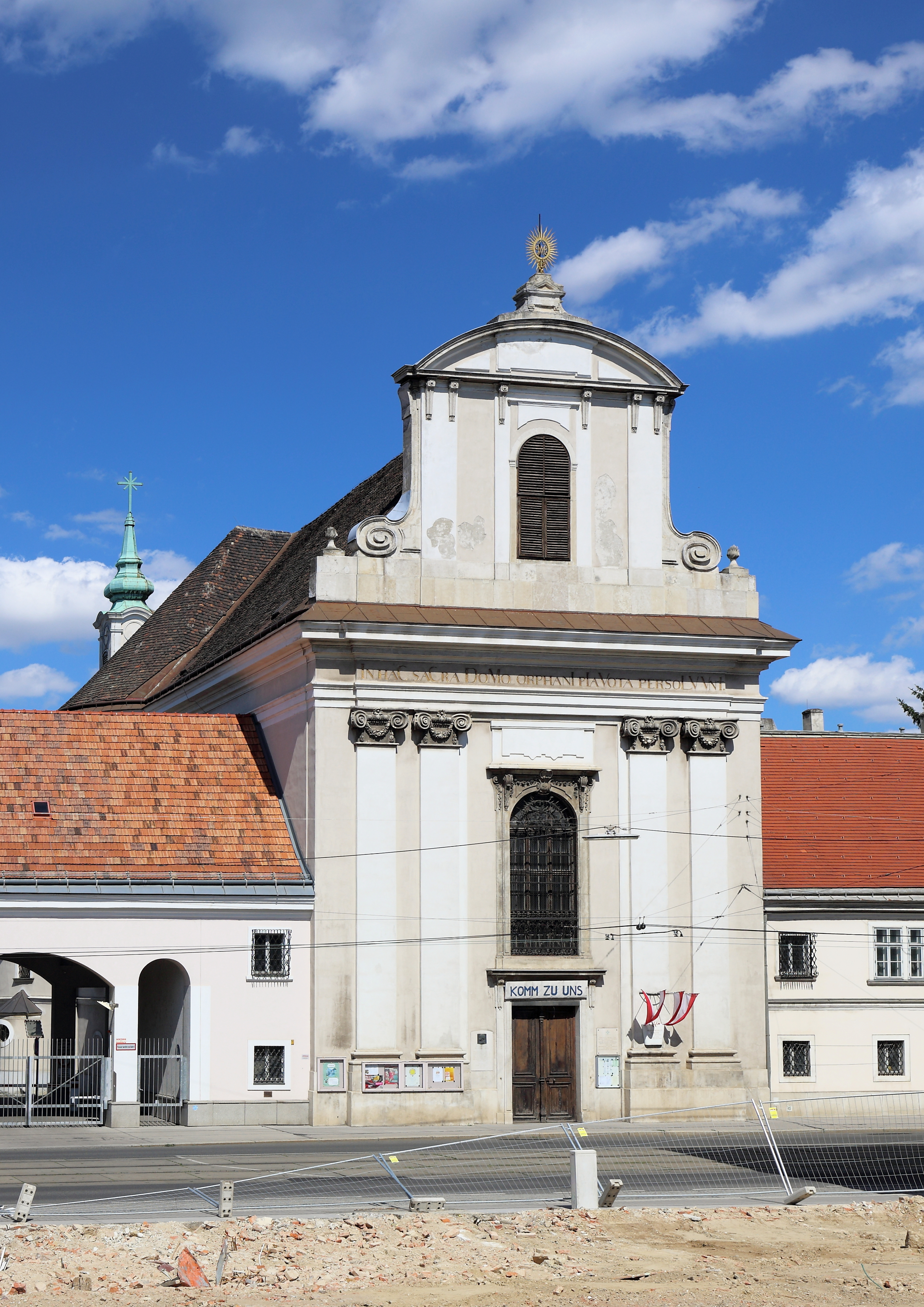
- Waisenhauskirche (Orphanage Church) of Vienna
- Key: C minor
- Catalogue: K. 139/47a
- Occasion: Consecration of the Waisenhauskirche
- Performed: 7 December 1768: Vienna
- Movements: 6
- Vocal: SATB choir and soloists
- Instrumental: trumpets; trombones; timpani; strings; continuo

The Missa solemnis in C minor, K. 139/47a, is a mass composed by Wolfgang Amadeus Mozart in the summer of 1768 in Vienna. It is scored for SATB soloists, SATB choir, violin I and II, 2 violas, 2 oboes, 2 trumpets, 2 clarini (high trumpets), 3 trombones colla parte, timpani and basso continuo.

== Background ==
The mass was commissioned by the Jesuit priest Father Ignaz Parhammer, who asked Mozart for music for the consecration of the new parish church Nativity of Mary on the Rennweg, Vienna, known as Waisenhauskirche (Orphanage Church). The commission gives the mass its nickname Waisenhausmesse (Orphanage Mass). Mozart also composed a trumpet concerto suitable for performance by a boy as well as an offertory, both thought to be lost. Indeed, due to cataloging errors, this mass was also considered lost for many years.

The first performance took place on 7 December 1768 at the church, in the presence of the court. The twelve-year-old Mozart conducted a choir of orphans in a performance that received "universal acclaim and admiration". This mass is considered Mozart's most ambitious work to be performed up until that point in time, and was his first and longest missa longa.

== Structure ==
The mass consists of six movements. Performances require approximately 40 minutes.

1. "Kyrie" Adagio, C minor,
  "Kyrie eleison, Christe eleison..." Allegro, C major, 3/4
  "Christe eleison..." Andante, F major, 2/4
  "Kyrie eleison..." Allegro, C major, 3/4
2. "Gloria" Allegro, C major,
  "Laudamus te..." Andante, G major, 3/4
  "Gratias agimus tibi..." Adagio, C major — Vivace, A minor,
  "Domine deus..." Andante, F major, 2/4
  "Qui tollis..." Adagio, F minor,
  "Quoniam tu solus sanctus..." Allegro, F major, 3/4
  "Cum sancto spiritu..." Allegro, C major,
3. "Credo" Allegro, C major,
  "Et incarnatus est..." Andante, F major, 6/8
  "Crucifixus..." Adagio, C minor,
  "Et resurrexit..." Allegro — Adagio — Allegro, C major,
  "Et in Spiritum Sanctum..." Andante, G major, 3/4
  "Et unam sanctam catholicam..." Allegro — Adagio, C major,
  "Et vitam venturi saeculi..." Allegro, C major,
4. "Sanctus" Adagio, C major,
  "Pleni sunt coeli et terra..." Allegro, C major, 3/4
  "Hosanna in excelsis" [Allegro], C major,
5. "Benedictus" Andante, F major,
  "Hosanna in excelsis" [Allegro], C major,
6. "Agnus Dei" Andante, C minor,
  "Dona nobis pacem..." Allegro, C major, 3/4

Despite its designation as a C minor mass, the music is predominantly in C major; masses wholly set in a minor key were considered unusual and funereal in the classical period.
