= Missa solemnis =

Extended musical setting of the Mass

Missa solemnis ( pl: Misae solemnes) is Latin for Solemn Mass, and is a genre of sacred music consisting of fulsome settings of the Christian Mass Ordinary which are festively scored (often for choir, solo voices, and orchestra) and render the (often Latin) text extensively — as opposed to the shorter and more modest Missa brevis form. In French, the genre is called Messe solennelle. The terms came into use in the classical period.

When 'the Missa solemnis' is used to point to a specific piece, without referring to a particular composer, Beethoven's seminal and eponymous setting of the mass in D major is oftentimes implied. Many other composers' masses are substantively solemn settings—in pace, proportion and scoring—and so form part of the genre, even though they are not explicitly titled as 'Misae solemnes': for example, several late settings of both Haydn and Schubert, and the three numbered settings of Anton Bruckner. Indeed, some of the greatest compositions in the genre have acquired common or popular names sans 'solemnis':—to wit, JS Bach's Mass in B minor and Mozart's Great Mass in C minor.

Solemn Masses have been written by many well-known composers, including these:

- JS Bach: Mass in B minor (1733/1749)
- Beethoven: Missa solemnis in D major (1823)
- Berlioz: Messe solennelle (1824)
- Bruckner: Missa solemnis in B-flat minor (1854), along with his triptych of great festive masses, the Mass No. 1 in D minor (1864), Mass No. 2 in E minor (1866), and Mass No. 3 in F minor (1868).
- Cherubini: Messe solenelle No. 2 in D minor (1811) per il Principe Esterházy (1811)
- Haydn: Missa in tempore belli (Mass in the Time of War) in C major, (1796)
- Hummel: Missa solemnis in C major (1806)
- Liszt: Missa solennis zur Einweihung der Basilika in Gran (Gran Mass) (first version 1855, second version 1857–58)
- Mozart: Mass in C minor, K. 139 "Waisenhaus" (1768), Mass in C major, K. 337 "Solemnis" (1780), Great Mass in C minor, K. 427 (1782/1783)
- Rossini: Petite messe solennelle (1863)
- Schubert: Mass No. 1, Mass No. 4, Mass No. 5, Mass No. 6
- Vierne: Messe solennelle (1900)
- Weber: Missa solemnis No. 2 (1818–1819) "Messe du Freischutz"

Other composers who wrote works the titles of which contained "Missa solemnis" include these (listed alphabetically): France Ačko (1941), Hendrik Andriessen (1946), Marco Betta, František Brixi, Antonio Buonomo (1983), Alfredo Casella (1944), Paul Creston, Georg Druschetzky (1804), Bohumil Fidler (1901), Joseph-Hector Fiocco, Konstanty Gorski, Michael Haydn (1772), Václav Emanuel Horák, Sigurd Islandsmoen (1954), Friedrich Kiel, Karel Blažej Kopřiva, Jean Langlais, Josef Lammerz (1990), Colin Mawby, Boleslaw Ocias, Antonio Sacchini, Johann Nepomuk Schelble, Wolfgang Seifen, Johann Baptist Wanhal (1778), and Bedřich Antonín Wiedermann (1848).

Festive mass settings in other languages include the composer Jakub Jan Ryba's Czech Christmas Mass (1796). While this was not a traditional mass text setting at all, and it was not in Latin, it was nevertheless explicitly labeled by its composer as a 'missa solemnis' (for the 'Festis Nativitatis').
