= Barcelona Mass =

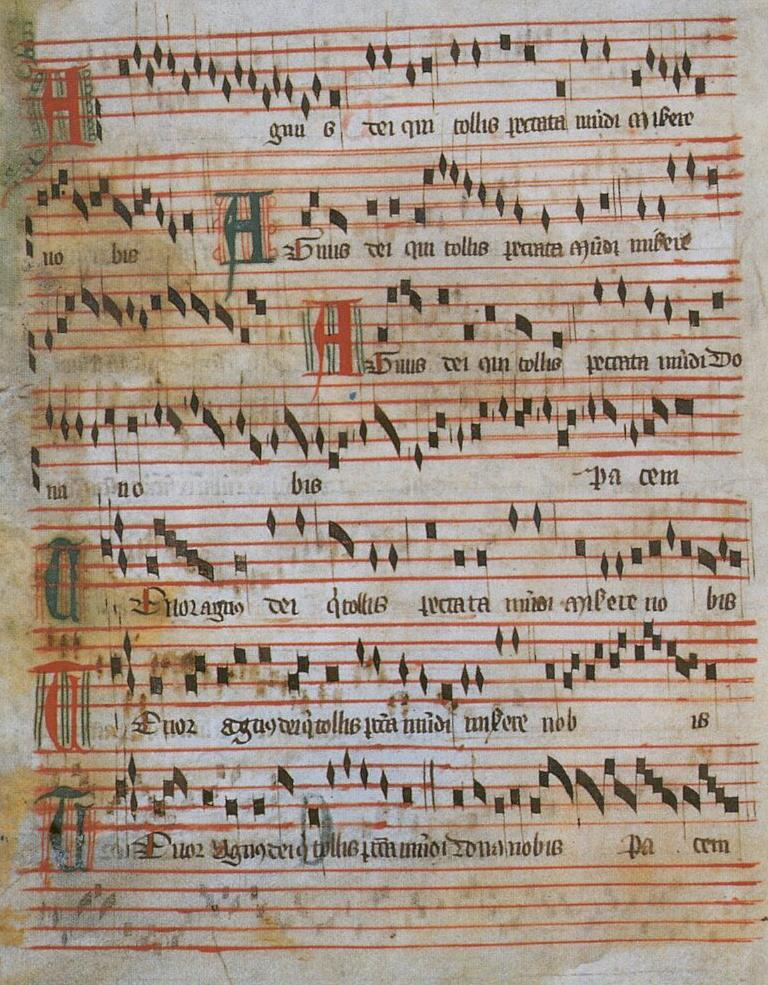
The Agnus Dei of the Barcelona Mass

The Barcelona Mass is a polyphonic mass written around 1360. Together with the Messe de Nostre Dame by Guillaume de Machaut and those of Toulouse, Tournai and the Sorbonne, it is one of the earliest preserved complete polyphonic musical settings of the Ordinary of the Mass. It is believed to belong to the repertoire of the Papal court at Avignon and is also linked to the chapel of King Martin I of Aragon.

It is preserved in a single manuscript kept in the Biblioteca de Catalunya in Barcelona (ms. 971), where it was found in 1925 by the musicologist Higinio Anglés.

It consists of the usual five parts, the Kyrie, Gloria, Credo, Sanctus and Agnus Dei. The Agnus Dei is written in four voices, while the other movements have three. The five parts are not written according to a unifying structural pattern and may have been written by different anonymous composers. The Gloria and Credo have also been independently preserved as standalone pieces in other sources. Unlike other mass cycles of the period, the Barcelona Mass contains neither a motetus over Ite, missa est nor a setting of the Benedictus, and its movements are not based on plain chant.

== Recordings ==
- Atrium Musicae de Madrid: Messe de Barcelone – Ars Nova du XIVe siècle. Harmonia Mundi 1972
- Pro Cantione Antiqua, London, Mark Brown (dir.): Missa Tournai. Missa Barcelona. Harmonia Mundi 1980
- Ensemble médiéval de Toulouse: La Messe de Barcelone / La Messe de Toulouse. Ariane 1988
- Linnamuusikud: AD 1994. Tallinn : Linnamuusikud, 1994
- Obsidienne: Barcelona Mass / Song of the Sibyl. Opus 111, 1995
