= Toulouse Mass =

“Order of the Missal According to the Custom of the Roman Curia,” featuring the Toulouse Mass

The Toulouse Mass is a polyphonic 14th-century musical setting of the Mass found in a manuscript in the municipal library of Toulouse. It was not composed by a single individual, but is presumed to have been compiled and performed as a unit. The present location of Toulouse does not necessarily mean it was composed there.

It is not completely clear whether the Mass portions included in the manuscript were intended as a complete polyphonic setting of the Mass, or merely represent isolated movements. They were inscribed in empty spaces in a manuscript that otherwise contains plainchants and texts. The manuscript is also missing a polyphonic Gloria in excelsis Deo and Credo. However, it does include a note identifying a motet on Ite, missa est following the Sanctus and Agnus Dei (which appear adjacently in the manuscript). The manuscript also has part of a tenor line from a Credo that appears in both the Ivrea Codex and Apt Codex, as well as the Barcelona Mass, so perhaps that movement was used as well. It is also possible there never were supposed to be a Gloria or Credo with the Mass; some plainchant Masses omit them.

The Mass was composed somewhat after the Tournai Mass, the earliest known such Mass. It is in "song style," where only one voice has a text, and has three voices; as opposed to the "simultaneous style" of the Tournai Mass. Some of the pieces seem to have been adapted from motets, however.

- The Kyrie is found in the Ivrea Codex as well, and a trope on it is in the Apt Codex.
- The Sanctus has a contratenor and cantus in the same range and with the same rhythmic formulas, which implies that it may have been a three-voice motet with one of the texts removed.
- The Agnus Dei uses the trope Rex immense pietatis (King of infinite mercy), and is the clearest use of "song style" in the Mass.
- The motet on Ite, missa est uses the text Laudemus Jesum Christum (Let us praise Jesus Christ). Unlike ordinary motets, it has only one line with text (thus the "song style"). It also resembles a four-voice motet with a part missing, perhaps omitted in order to match the style of the other pieces.

== Recordings ==
- Schola Cantorum of the Church of St. Mary the Virgin: Charpentier, Messe pour le Samedy de Pasques; Delalande; Messe de Tournai; Messe de Toulouse. Musical Heritage Society, 1979.
- Ensemble médiéval de Toulouse: La Messe de Barcelone / La Messe de Toulouse. Ariane 1988
- Ensemble Organum: Missa Gotica. ZigZag 2009
