= Tournai Mass =

The Tournai Mass is a polyphonic setting of the mass from 14th-century France. It is preserved in a manuscript from the library of the Tournai Cathedral.

== Background ==
Before the 15th century, most musical settings of the Ordinary of the Mass were grouped according to movement. For instance, the Ivrea Codex and Apt Codex both contain mass movements, and these movements are grouped so that all of the Kyries are together, all of the Glorias are together, and so on. A priest selecting the music for the service would choose one from each group to be sung, and so any setting of a movement could be used in combination with any other. The Tournai Mass is the first known mass to have been written in a manuscript as if it were a single unified setting of the entire Ordinary. Three other similarly compiled masses from the 13th and early 14th century survive: the Toulouse Mass, Barcelona Mass, and Sorbonne Mass (also known as the Besançon Mass). All of these masses are anonymous, and musicological scholarship indicates that all of them are compilations of the works of several composers.

== The Mass ==
The Tournai Mass comprises six movements, each of which is for three voices.

- The Kyrie is written in Franconian notation, and is stylistically typical of mid-to-late 13th century practice.
- The Gloria has freer rhythmic interplay than the Kyrie, characteristic of Ars Nova developments. It is concluded by a huge amen which makes use of the hoquet technique. It probably dates from the period 1325–1350.
- The Credo is in a simple contrapuntal style, and must have been a popular setting, because it is found in three other extant manuscripts, including the Apt Codex.
- The Sanctus, like the Kyrie, is Franconian in style and notation.
- The Agnus Dei is also Franconian.
- The motet to the text Ite, Missa Est ends the mass. This motet is also found in the Ivrea Codex.

Because of the wide disparities in style and notation, and because no underlying musical structure (such as a common cantus firmus or parody procedure) has been noted between the mass movements, the Tournai Mass is believed to have been composed independently by several musicians over a period of fifty or more years, and was later compiled by a scribe to be performed as a whole. The first known mass to have been conceived of and composed as a single unified work is the Messe de Nostre Dame by Guillaume de Machaut, who probably knew the Tournai Mass and may have used it as a model.

The Tournai Mass was first described by Edmund Coussemaker in his 1869 report Une Messe du XIIIe Siecle (his 13th century designation is now considered erroneous). Anne Walters Robertson has proposed that the mass was not used for the liturgy, but was instead compiled for an "Annunciation drama" to celebrate the Virgin.

== Recordings ==
- Tournai Mass (13th-14th Century). Marc Honegger (dir.). Christophorus.
- Musica Viva München, Vol. 4. La Messe de Tournai (arr. Hans Blümer, prepared by Pierre Boulez). rec. 1960. Col Legno, 2000.
- Capella Antiqua München. Missa Tournai um 1330. Motetten um 1320. Telefunken, 1967.
- Schola Cantorum of the Church of St. Mary the Virgin: Charpentier, Messe pour le Samedy de Pasques; Delalande; Messe de Tournai; Messe de Toulouse. Musical Heritage Society, 1979.
- Pro Cantione Antiqua. Missa Tournai. Missa Barcelona. Harmonia Mundi IC 065-99-870, 1980.
- Ensemble Vocal Guillaume Dufay. Anonyme du XIVe Siècle: Messe de Tournai; Guillaume de Machaut: Messe de Nostre Dame. Erato STU 71303, 1981.
- Ensemble Organum. Messe de Tournai. Harmonia Mundi 7901353, 1991.
- Trio Mediaeval. Words of the Angel. ECM, 2001.
- Tonus Peregrinus. The Mass of Tournai/St. Luke Passion. Naxos, 2003.
- Clemencic Consort, Choralschola der Wiener Hofburgkapelle. La Messe de Tournai. Codex Musical de las Huelgas. Oehms, 2005,
- Ensemble De Caelis. Missa Tournai. Ricercar, 2008.
