= Messe de Nostre Dame =

Mass setting by Guillaume de Machaut

- Mass by Guillaume de Machaut
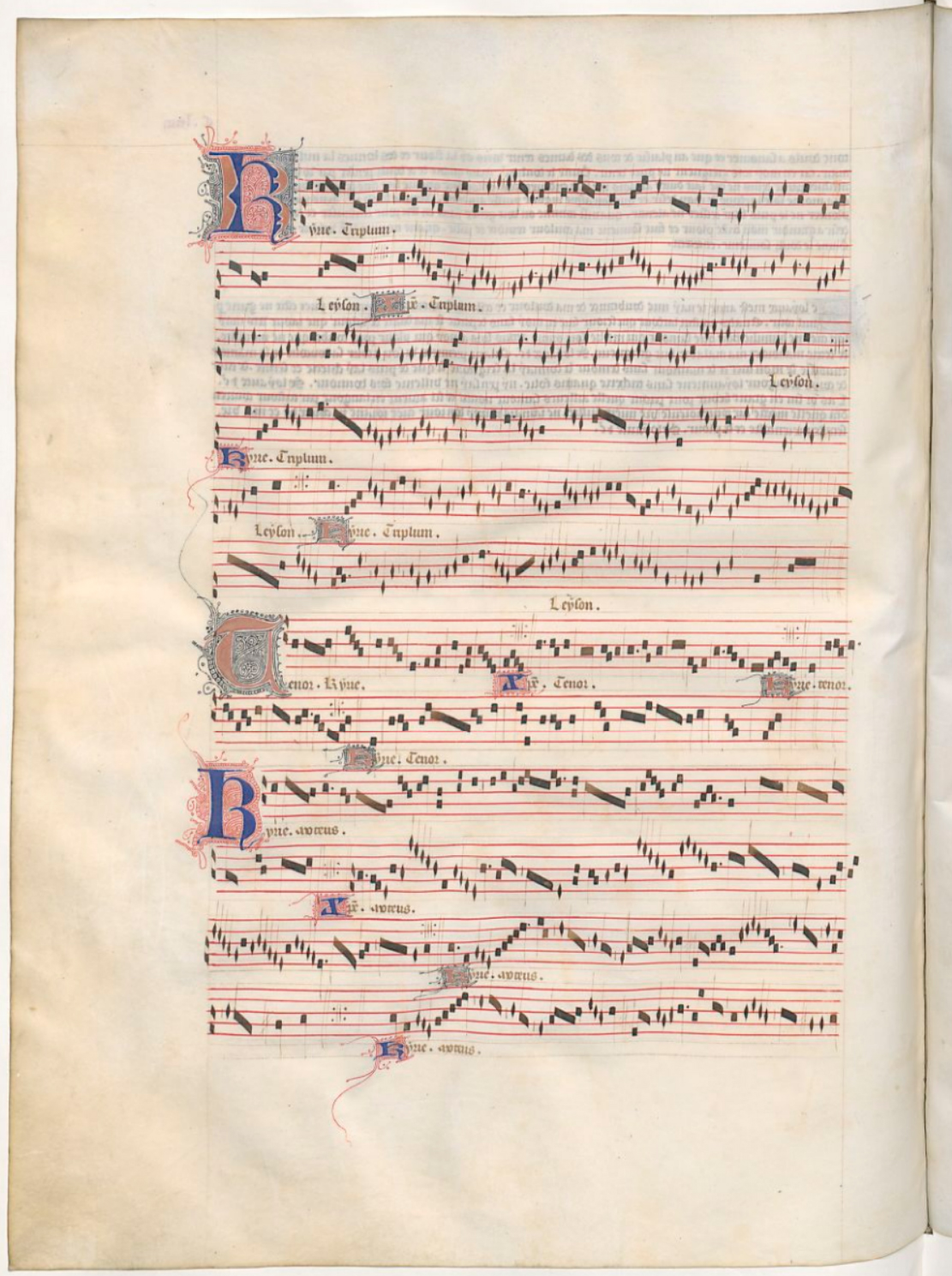
- Kyrie
- Text: Ordinary of the Mass
- Language: Latin
- Composed: 14th century
- Movements: 6
- Scoring: SATB choir

Messe de Nostre Dame (Mass of Our Lady) is a polyphonic mass composed before 1365 by French poet and composer Guillaume de Machaut (c. 1300–1377). Widely regarded as one of the masterpieces of medieval music and of all religious music, it is historically notable as the earliest complete setting of the Ordinary of the Mass attributable to a single composer (in contrast to earlier compilations such as the Tournai Mass).

== Structure ==
Kyrie from the Messe de Nostre Dame
By Guillaume de Machaut, midi instrumental version

The Messe de Nostre Dame consists of six movements, namely the Kyrie, Gloria, Credo, Sanctus, Agnus Dei, and the dismissal Ite, missa est. The tenor of the Kyrie is based on Vatican Kyrie IV, the Sanctus and Agnus correspond to Vatican Mass XVII and the Ite is on Sanctus VIII. The Gloria and Credo have no apparent chant basis, although they are stylistically related to one another.

Machaut's Messe de Nostre Dame is for four voices rather than the more common three. Machaut added a countertenor voice that moved in the same low range as the tenor, sometimes replacing it as the lowest voice.

== Unification ==
In the liturgy of the Mass, the items of the Ordinary are not performed consecutively, but are separated from one another by prayers and chants. Machaut's unification of these items into an artistic whole is the earliest instance of an Ordinary of the Mass setting that is stylistically coherent and was also conceived as a unit. This gesture imposed on the Ordinary is a previously unconsidered abstract artistic idea and potentially influenced composers throughout the ages to continue setting the Ordinary to stylistically coherent music.

== Purpose and style ==
Machaut composed his Messe de Nostre Dame for the Cathedral at Reims where he served as a canon, a permanent member of the clergy. According to a rubric found at the Cathedral, it would have likely been performed for the Saturday Lady Mass. Some scholars hypothesize that, contrary to popular belief, Machaut did not actually come to work for the Reims Cathedral until the end of the 1350s, composing the mass as an act of devotion and dedication marking his arrival in the precinct. In conformity with the wills of Guillaume and his brother Jean, also a canon at the Cathedral, the mass was believed to have been transformed into a memorial service for them following their deaths. However, neither the specific nature of its performance (if such a performance exists) nor the service the Mass was prepared for has been conclusively ascertained.

It is possible that Machaut was familiar with the Tournai Mass, an even earlier polyphonic 14th-century mass setting in which each movement is believed to have been written independently by different composers. The Gloria and Credo of the Messe de Nostre Dame exhibit some similarities to the Tournai mass, such as textless musical interludes, simultaneous style, and long melismatic Amens. The other four movements of Machaut's mass are composed in motet style with Mass text.

== Recordings ==
It is often stated that the Messe de Nostre Dame was first recorded by Safford Cape in 1956 for the Deutsche Grammophon Archiv Produktion Series. However, earlier recordings were made by the Dessoff Choirs under Paul Boepple, in 1951; and a partial recording by Les Paraphonistes de Saint-Jean-des-Matines under Guillaume de Van in 1936. More recent recordings include the following:

- Guillaume de Machaut: Messe de Nostre Dame. (1984), Taverner Consort and Taverner Choir directed by Andrew Parrott (EMI ASD1435761)
- Guillaume de Machaut: Messe de Nostre Dame. (1993), Hilliard Ensemble directed by Paul Hillier (Hyperion CDA66358)
- Early Music – Machaut: La Messe De Nostre Dame, Le Voir Dit (1996), Oxford Camerata directed by Jeremy Summerly (Naxos 553833)
- Guillaume de Machaut – Messe de Notre Dame. (1996), Ensemble Organum directed by Marcel Peres
- Guillaume de Machaut: Messe de Nostre Dame. (2000), Ensemble Gilles Binchois directed by Dominique Vellard (Cantus 9624)
- Guillaume de Machaut: Messe de Nostre Dame. (2008), Diabolus in Musica directed by Antoine Guerber (Alpha 132)
- Guillaume de Machaut: Messe de Nostre Dame. (2016), Graindelavoix directed by Björn Schmelzer (Glossa GCD-P32110)
