= Missa Papae Marcelli =

Mass by Giovanni Pierluigi da Palestrina

- Mass by Palestrina
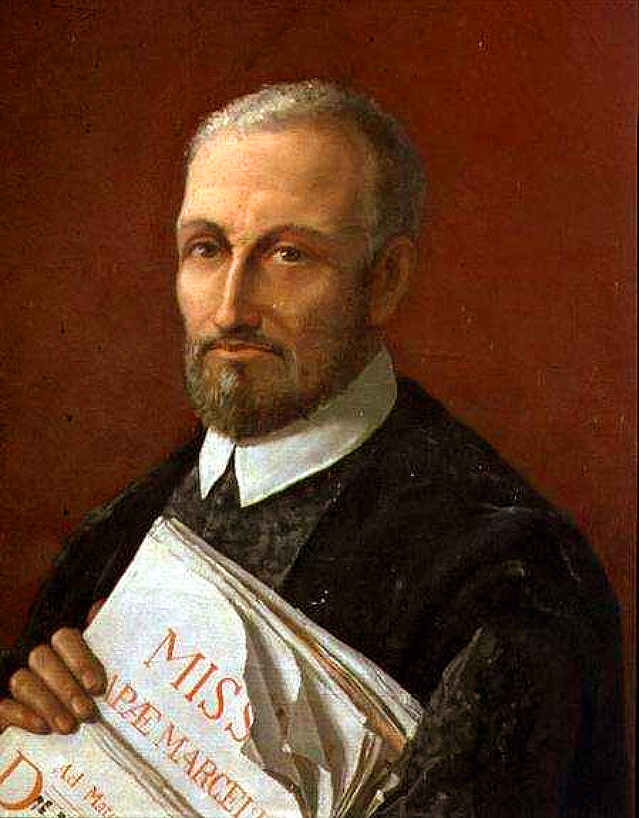
- The composer
- Occasion: in honour of Pope Marcellus II
- Composed: 1562?
- Scoring: SATB choir, up to seven parts

Missa Papae Marcelli, or Pope Marcellus Mass, is a mass sine nomine by Giovanni Pierluigi da Palestrina. It is his best-known mass, and is regarded as an archetypal example of the complex polyphony championed by Palestrina. It was sung at the papal coronation Masses (the last being the coronation of Paul VI in 1963).

== Style ==
The Missa Papae Marcelli consists, like most Renaissance masses, of a Kyrie, Gloria, Credo, Sanctus/Benedictus, and Agnus Dei, though the third part of the Agnus Dei is a separate movement (designated "Agnus II"). The mass is freely composed, not based upon a cantus firmus, paraphrase, or parody. Perhaps because of this, the mass is not as thematically consistent as Palestrina's masses based on models. It is primarily a six-voice mass, but voice combinations are varied throughout the piece; Palestrina scores Agnus II for seven voices, and the use of the full forces is reserved for specific climactic portions in the text. It is set primarily in a homorhythmic, declamatory style, with little overlapping of text and a general preference for block chords such that the text can clearly be heard in performance, unlike many polyphonic masses of the 16th century. As in much of Palestrina's contrapuntal work, voices move primarily in stepwise motion, and the voice leading strictly follows the rules of the diatonic modes codified by theorist Gioseffo Zarlino.

== History ==
The mass was composed in honor of Pope Marcellus II, who reigned for three weeks in 1555. Recent scholarship suggests the most likely date of composition is 1562, when it was copied into a manuscript at the Basilica di Santa Maria Maggiore in Rome.

The third and closing sessions of the Council of Trent were held in 1562–63, at which the use of polyphonic music in the Catholic Church was discussed. Concerns were raised over two problems: first, the use of music that was objectionable, such as secular songs provided with religious lyrics (contrafacta) or masses based on songs with lyrics about drinking or sex; and second, whether imitation in polyphonic music obscured the words of the mass, interfering with the listener's devotion. Some debate occurred over whether polyphony should be banned outright in worship, and some of the auxiliary publications by attendants of the Council caution against both of these problems. However, none of the official proclamations from the Council mentions polyphonic music, excepting one injunction against the use of music that is, in the words of the Council, "lascivious or impure".

Starting in the late 16th century, a legend began that the second of these points, the threat that polyphony might have been banned by the Council because of the unintelligibility of the words, was the impetus behind Palestrina's composition of this mass. It was believed that the simple, declamatory style of Missa Papae Marcelli convinced Cardinal Carlo Borromeo, on hearing, that polyphony could be intelligible, and that music such as Palestrina's was all too beautiful to ban from the Church. In 1607, the composer Agostino Agazzari wrote:

Music of the older kind is no longer in use, both because of the confusion and babel of the words, arising from the long and intricate imitations, and because it has no grace, for with all the voices singing, one hears neither period nor sense, these being interfered with and covered up by imitations...And on this account music would have come very near to being banished from the Holy Church by a sovereign pontiff [Pius IV], had not Giovanni Palestrina founded the remedy, showing that the fault and error lay, not with the music, but with the composers, and composing in confirmation of this the Mass entitled Missa Papae Marcelli.

— Quoted in Taruskin, Richard, and Weiss, Piero. Music in the Western World:A History in Documents. Schirmer, 1984, p. 141.

Jesuit musicians of the 17th century maintained this rumor, and it made its way into music history books into the 19th century, when historian Giuseppe Baini, in his 1828 biography of Palestrina, couched him as the "savior of polyphony" from a council wishing to wipe it out entirely:

On Saturday, 28 April 1565, by order of Cardinal Vitellozzi, all the singers of the papal chapel were gathered together at his residence. Cardinal Borromeo was already there, together with all the other six cardinals of the papal commission. Palestrina was there as well...they sang three Masses, of which the Pope Marcellus Mass was the last...The greatest and most incessant praise was given to the third, which was extraordinarily acclaimed and, by virtue of its entirely novel character, astonished even the performers themselves. Their Eminences heaped their congratulations on the composer, recommending to him to go on writing in that style and to communicate it to his pupils.

— Quoted in Taruskin, Richard, and Weiss, Piero. Music in the Western World:A History in Documents. Schirmer, 1984, p. 142.

An entry in the papal chapel diaries confirms that a meeting such as the one described by Baini occurred, but no mention is made of whether the Missa Papae Marcelli was performed there or what the reaction of the audience was. This legend persisted into the 20th century; Hans Pfitzner's opera Palestrina is based upon this understanding of the deliberations of the Tridentine officials. While Palestrina sympathized with many of the Council's decisions, and, like Vincenzo Ruffo, sought deliberately to compose in a simplified, easily understood style to please church officials, there is no evidence to support either the view that the Council sought to banish polyphony entirely or that Palestrina's mass was the deciding factor in changing their minds.

In the latter part of the 20th century, the Missa Papae Marcelli has been recorded frequently, and is often used as a model for the study of stile antico Renaissance polyphony in university courses on music.

== Analysis ==
Head-motif of Missa Papae Marcelli at first occurrence in the Kyrie

Missa Papae Marcelli - I. Kyrie

Missa Papae Marcelli - II. Gloria

Missa Papae Marcelli - III. Credo

Missa Papae Marcelli - IV. Sanctus

Missa Papae Marcelli - V. Agnus Dei I

Missa Papae Marcelli - VI. Agnus Dei II

Missa Papae Marcelli does not (as far as is known) make use of any pre-existing theme. The motif of a rising perfect fourth and stepwise return (illustrated) is used extensively throughout this mass. It is similar in profile to the opening of the French secular song "L'homme armé", which provided the theme for many Renaissance masses. But this is probably a coincidence, as themes with this profile were common in the 16th century, and Palestrina himself used them in several other masses.

The Kyrie consists of imitative polyphony in Palestrina's earlier style, based on the main motif. It is in the middle movements that Palestrina applies the simpler style needed after the Council of Trent. Richard Taruskin described the Credo as "a strategically planned series of cadential 'cells' ... each expressed through a fragment of text declaimed homorhythmically by a portion of the choir ... and rounded off by a beautifully crafted cadence". The words are clearly distinguishable, since melodic decoration is confined to the longest syllables. A different selection of voices is used for each such phrase.

The Sanctus begins with very short phrases cadencing on C. Longer phrases then cadence on F, D and G before the music returns to C with conclusive effect. This was a new technique, using "tonal planning" to replace imitation as the means to keep the music moving forward.

The Agnus Dei returns to the imitative polyphony of the Kyrie (the opening of Agnus Dei I repeats that of the Kyrie). As was frequently done in the 16th century, Palestrina adds an extra voice in Agnus Dei II, making seven for this movement, in which is embedded a three-part canon that begins with the head-motive.
