= Mass (Jongen) =

Mass setting by Joseph Jongen

- by Joseph Jongen
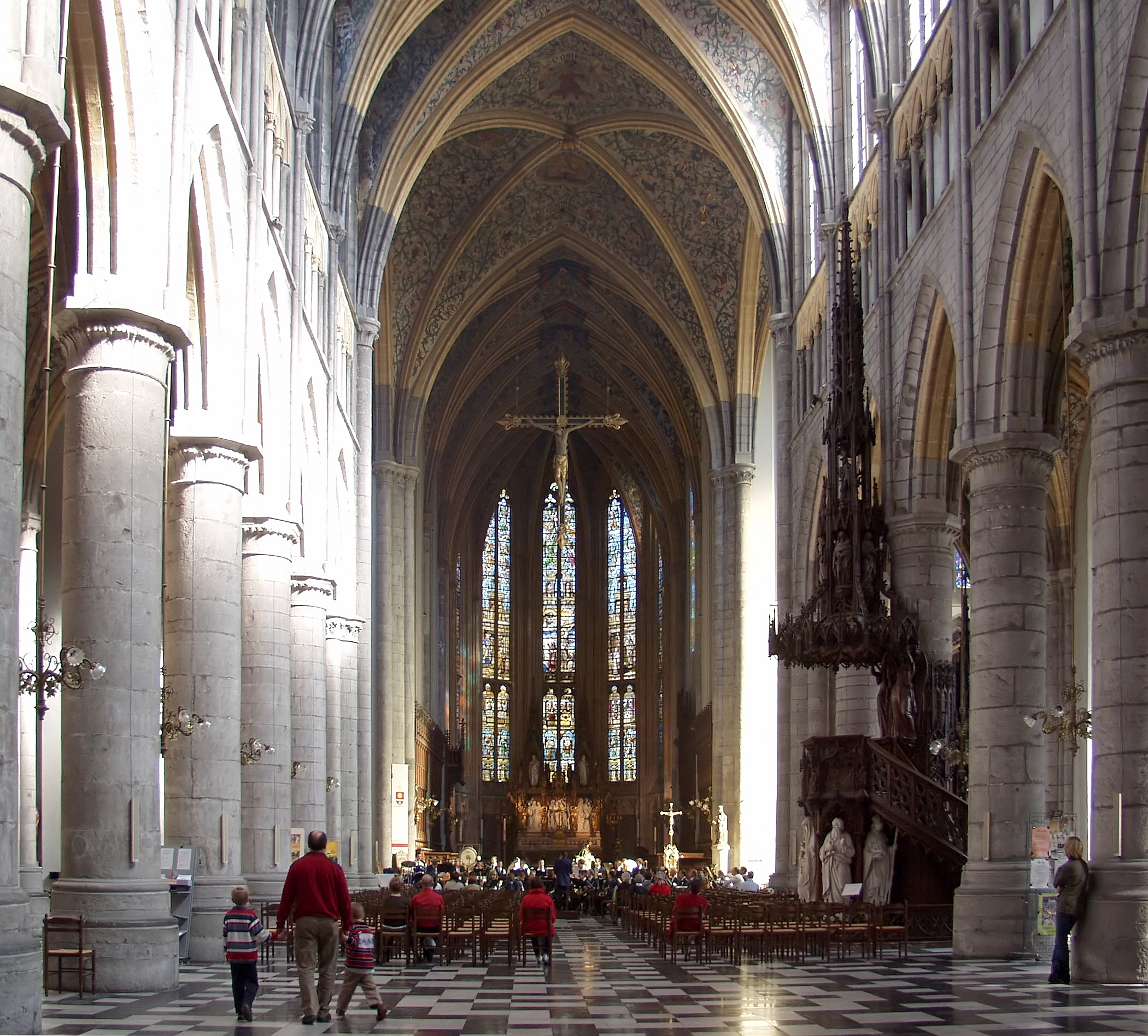
- Cathédrale Saint-Paul de Liège, where the mass was first performed
- English: Mass in honour of the Blessed Sacrament
- Full title: Messe en l'honeur du Saint-Sacrement
- Opus: 130
- Occasion: 700 years of the feast Corpus Christi
- Text: Mass ordinary
- Language: Latin
- Composed: 1945 / 1949 (Credo)
- Dedication: Alphonse Jongen
- Performed: 23 June 1946
- Published: 1990
- Movements: six
- Scoring: choir; brass; organ

The Mass, Op. 130, is a setting of the Latin Mass ordinary by Joseph Jongen for choir, brass band and organ. Jongen composed it in 1945 in memory of his brother Alphonse. The full title is Messe en l'honeur du Saint-Sacrement. Five movements were first performed in 1946 at the Liège Cathedral. The work was published by Oxford University Press in 1990.

== History ==
The Belgian composer Joseph Jongen is known mostly for instrumental and chamber music. He has written around 60 art songs and secular choral works, but little sacred music. After he retired as the director of the Brussels Conservatoire in 1939 however, his interest in choral compositions for the church was raised by Georges Alexis, who had studied with him at the Liège Conservatoire. Alexis possibly initiated the writing of a mass to celebrate the 700th anniversary of the feast Corpus Christi in Liège.

During World War II, Jongen could not compose anything from August 1944, due to the depressing circumstances of his life at the time. His brother Alphonse who had been a canon at the Liège Cathedral and to whom he had been close, died after surgery. His son Jacques was arrested by the Gestapo. Jacques was freed again in March 1945, and Jongen wrote later: "It was then that I began to write the Mass."

Jongen completed the Mass at Sart-lez-Spa between 9 July and 16 August 1945 and dedicated it to the memory of his brother Alphonse. Jongen first wrote a missa brevis, omitting the Credo from the mass ordinary. The full title is Messe en l'honeur du Saint-Sacrement, marking it as a mass in honour of the Blessed Sacrament.

The Mass was first performed on Corpus Christi, 23 June 1946, during a pontifical mass at the Cathédrale Saint-Paul de Liège, conducted by the composer. The work is also known as Messe de la Fête-Dieu, after the feast day.

Jongen completed it to a setting of the full mass by adding the Credo in 1949. It was published by Oxford University Press in 1990.

== Structure, scoring and music ==
The mass is structured in six movements. All four voices SATB are at times divided, mostly in homophony. The voices are marked "solo" at the beginning of the Benedictus. The brass ensemble consists of two trumpets, four horns, three trombones and tuba.

In the following table of the movements, the markings and time signatures are taken from the vocal score.

Incipit	Voices	Marking	Key	Time
Kyrie	SATB	Modéré	G minor	common time
Gloria	SATTBB	Allegro (ma moderato)	D major	3/4
Credo	SATB	Allegro moderato	D major	2/2
Sanctus	S A T B SATB	Maestoso (Fanfare)	D major	common time
Benedictus	SATB	Andantino (non troppo mosso)	G major	12/8
Agnus dei	SATB	Grave	E minor	common time

Alexis inspired several musical features of the Mass, such including elements from Gregorian chant, the inclusion of brass instruments after the model of Giovanni Gabrieli, and writing more counterpoint than before, such as fugato for "Pleni sunt caeli" of the Sanctus, and counterpoint in the voices in the "Cum Sancto Spiritu" of the Gloria and the "Et resurrexit" of the Credo. Links between movements are subtle, "often texturally rather than thematically related".

== Performance and recording ==
The first performance of the Mass in Germany was performed by the Reger-Chor, conducted by Gabriel Dessauer, in 1988 before it was printed, at the Stiftskirche of Aschaffenburg, repeated in St. Bonifatius, Wiesbaden.

The Mass was recorded in 1994 by the Brussels Choral Society and the Luc Capouillez Brass Ensemble, conducted by Tom Cunningham. It was recorded again in 2007 by St. John's College Choir, Cambridge, the London City Brass and organist Paul Provost, conducted by David Hill.
