= Palmeri =

Palmeri is a surname derived from the name Palmer. Notable people with the surname include:

- Frankie Palmeri, member of the band Emmure
- Lori Palmeri (born 1967), American politician
- Martín Palmeri (born 1965), Argentine composer
- Tara Palmeri (born 1987), American journalist

== See also ==
- Palmieri
