= Mass (music) =

Form of sacred musical composition

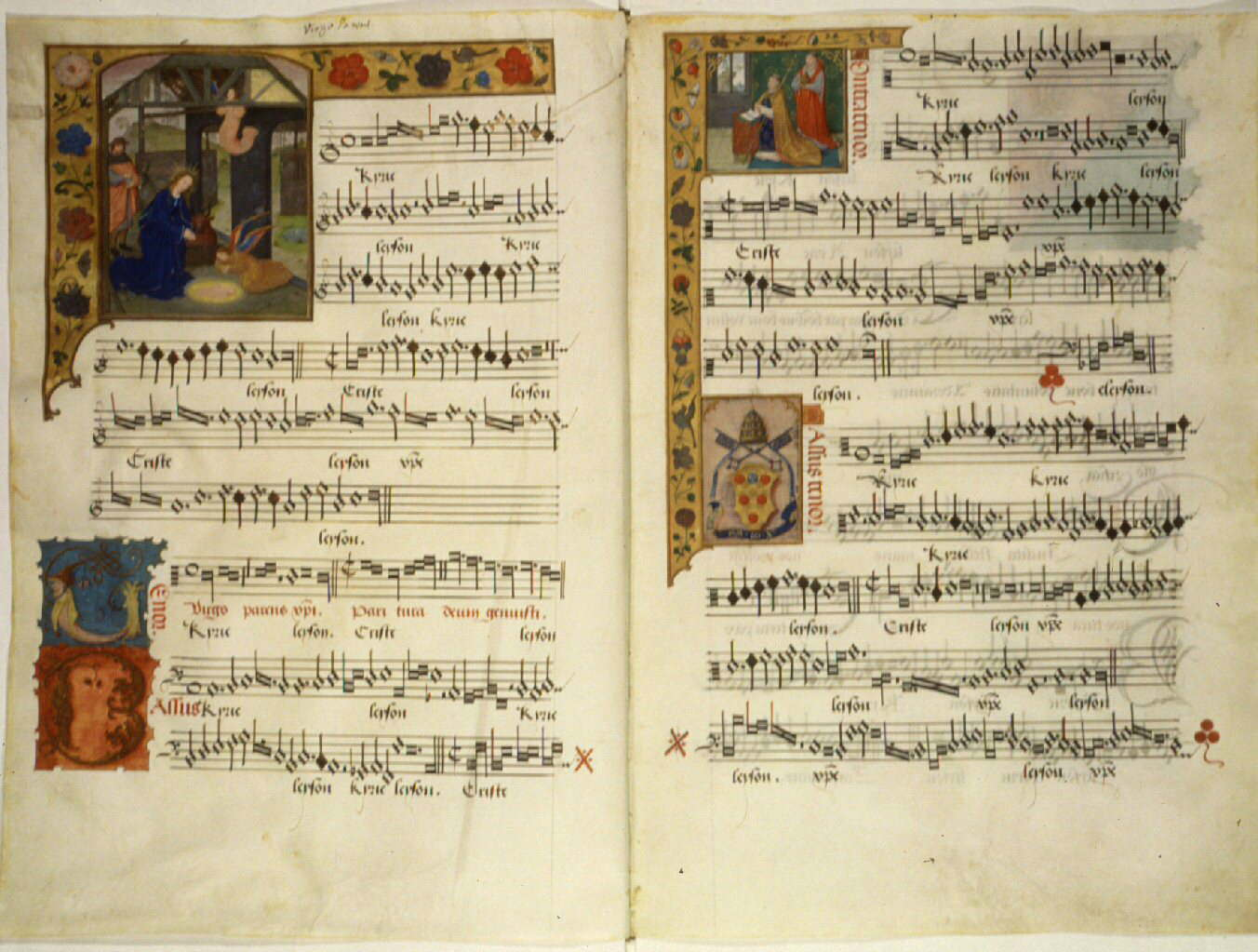
Missa Virgo parens Christi by Jacobus Barbireau

The mass (Note: The New Grove Dictionary of Music uses lower case "mass" to distinguish the musical genre from the celebration of Holy Mass, the liturgy.) (Latin: missa, Italian: messa, French: messe, German: Messe) is a form of musical composition that sets the texts of the western Christian Eucharistic liturgy (principally that of the Catholic Church, the Anglican Communion and Lutheranism) known as the Mass. Typically these are the five movements of the Ordinary of the Mass (Kyrie, Gloria in excelsis, Credo, Sanctus and Agnus Dei) but the cycle may be abbreviated (missa brevis) or expanded to include some or all of the Proper of the Mass (plenary mass or missa plena). A special case of the later is the Requiem, so called from the opening word of its Introit.

Until the Second Vatican Council Catholic masses set the liturgy in Latin, the sacred language of the Roman Rite, but there are a significant number written in vernacular languages of non-Catholic countries, beginning with Luther's Deutsche Messe (1526) and the Communion Service of Cramer's Book of Common Prayer (1549). Since 1970 a number of Catholic masses have been written in the approved translations of their various countries, alongside new Latin settings. An older tradition of vernacular singing took place at Low Masses, at which hymns were sung instead of the liturgical texts; Schubert's Deutsche Messe is the most famous example.

Masses can be a cappella, that is, for choir without an independent accompaniment, or they can be accompanied by obbligato instruments up to and including a full orchestra, and are frequently performed in a concert hall.

== History ==
=== Middle Ages ===
The earliest musical settings of the mass are Gregorian chant. The different unchanging portions of the mass, collectively known as the Ordinary, came into the liturgy at different times, with the Kyrie probably being first (perhaps as early as the 7th century) and the Credo being last (it did not become part of the Roman mass until 1014).

In the early 14th century, composers began writing polyphonic versions of the sections of the Ordinary. The reason for this surge in interest is not known, but it has been suggested that there was a shortage of new music since composers were increasingly attracted to secular music, and overall interest in writing sacred music had entered a period of decline. The Ordinary then would have music which was available for performance all the time.

Two manuscripts from the 14th century, the Ivrea Codex and the Apt Codex, are the primary sources for polyphonic settings of the Ordinary. Stylistically, these settings are similar to both motets and secular music of the time, with a three-voice texture dominated by the highest part. Most of this music was written or assembled at the papal court at Avignon.

Several anonymous complete masses from the 14th century survive, including the Tournai Mass; however, discrepancies in style indicate that the movements of these masses were written by several composers and later compiled by scribes into a single set. The first complete mass we know of whose composer can be identified was the Messe de Nostre Dame (Mass of Our Lady) by Guillaume de Machaut in the 14th century.

=== Renaissance ===
The musical setting of the Ordinary of the mass was the principal large-scale form of the Renaissance. The earliest complete settings date from the 14th century, with the most famous example being the Messe de Nostre Dame of Guillaume de Machaut. Individual movements of the mass, and especially pairs of movements (such as Gloria–Credo pairs, or Sanctus–Agnus pairs), were commonly composed during the 14th and early 15th centuries. Complete masses by a single composer were the norm by the middle of the 15th century, and the form of the mass, with the possibilities for large-scale structure inherent in its multiple movement format, was the main focus of composers within the area of sacred music; it was not to be eclipsed until the motet and related forms became more popular in the first decades of the 16th century.

Most 15th-century masses were based on a cantus firmus, usually from a Gregorian chant, and most commonly put in the tenor voice. The cantus firmus sometimes appeared simultaneously in other voices, using a variety of contrapuntal techniques. Later in the century, composers such as Guillaume Dufay, Johannes Ockeghem, and Jacob Obrecht, used secular tunes for cantus firmi. This practice was accepted with little controversy until prohibited by the Council of Trent in 1562. In particular, the song L'homme armé has a long history with composers; more than 40 separate mass settings exist.

Other techniques for organizing the cyclic mass evolved by the beginning of the 16th century, including the paraphrase technique, in which the cantus firmus was elaborated and ornamented, and the parody technique, in which several voices of a polyphonic source, not just one, were incorporated into the texture of the mass. Paraphrase and parody supplanted cantus firmus as the techniques of choice in the 16th century: Palestrina alone wrote 51 parody masses.

Yet another technique used to organize the multiple movements of a mass was canon. The earliest masses based entirely on canon are Johannes Ockeghem's Missa prolationum, in which each movement is a prolation canon on a freely-composed tune, and the Missa L'homme armé of Guillaume Faugues, which is also entirely canonic but also uses the famous tune L'homme armé throughout. Pierre de La Rue wrote four separate canonic masses based on plainchant, and one of Josquin des Prez's mature masses, the Missa Ad fugam, is entirely canonic and free of borrowed material.

The Missa sine nomine, literally "Mass without a name", refers to a mass written on freely composed material. Sometimes these masses were named for other things, such as Palestrina's famous Missa Papae Marcelli, the Mass of Pope Marcellus, and many times they were canonic masses, as in Josquin's Missa sine nomine.

Many famous and influential masses were composed by Josquin des Prez, the single most influential composer of the middle Renaissance. At the end of the 16th century, prominent representatives of a cappella choral counterpoint included the Englishman William Byrd, the Castilian Tomás Luis de Victoria and the Roman Giovanni Pierluigi da Palestrina, whose Missa Papae Marcelli is sometimes credited with saving polyphony from the censure of the Council of Trent. By the time of Palestrina, however, most composers outside of Rome were using other forms for their primary creative outlet for expression in the realm of sacred music, principally the motet and the madrigale spirituale; composers such as the members of the Venetian School preferred the possibilities inherent in the new forms. Other composers, such as Orlande de Lassus, working in Munich and comfortably distant from the conservative influence of the Council of Trent, continued to write parody masses on secular songs. Monteverdi composed masses in stile antico, the Missa in illo tempore was published in 1610, one Messa a 4 da cappella in 1641 as part of Selva morale e spirituale along with single movements of the mass in stile concertato, another Messa a 4 da cappella was published after his death, in 1650.

Antoine Brumel composed a Missa Et ecce terrae motus with the employment of twelve voices, Stefano Bernardi created masses for double choir for the balconies of the Salzburg Cathedral, such as the 1630 Missa primi toni octo vocum, when he was music director of the new building.

=== Baroque to Romantic (Catholic and Lutheran traditions) ===
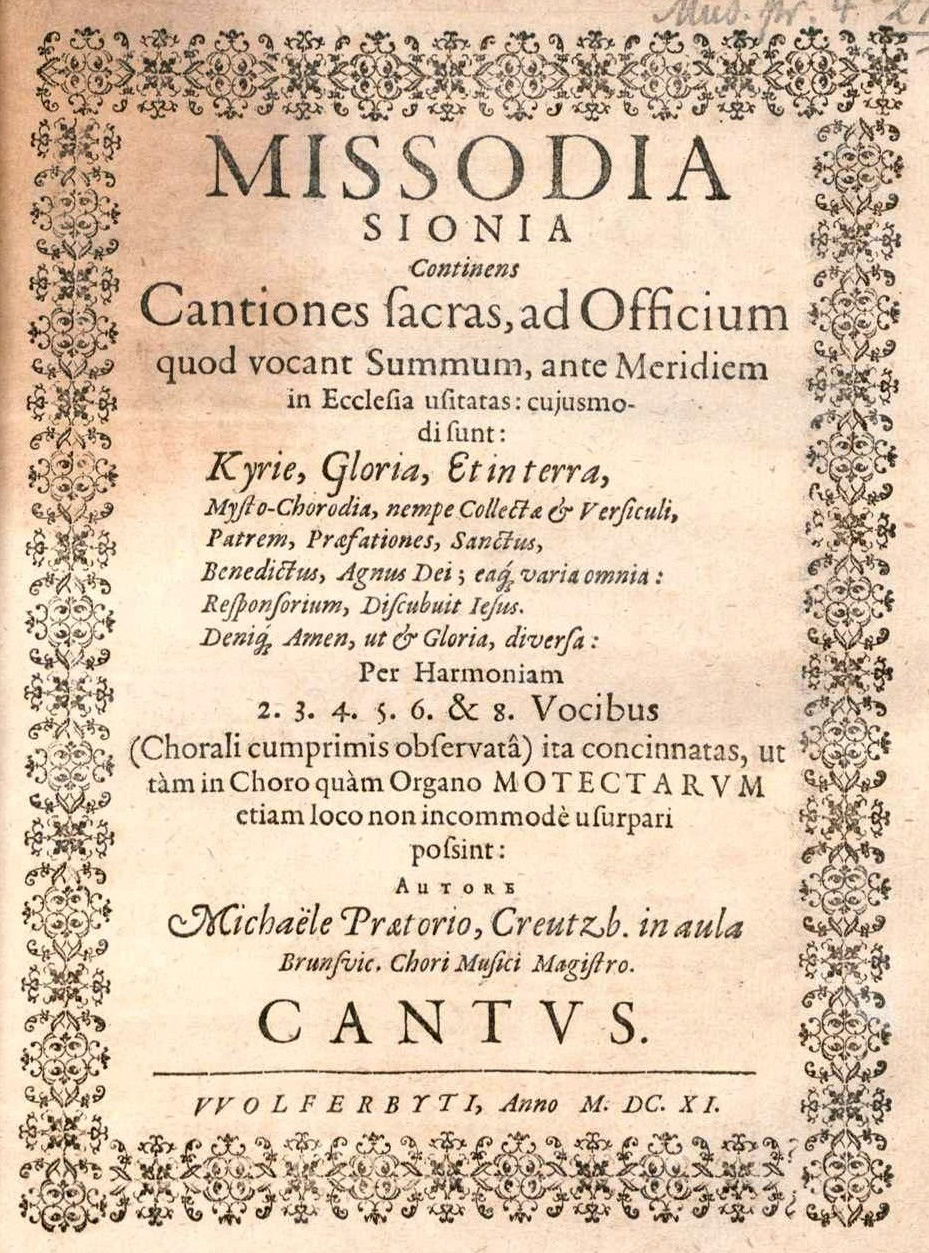
Missodia Sionia, title page 1611

The early Baroque era initiated stylistic changes which led to increasing disparity between masses written entirely in the traditional polyphonic manner (stile antico), whose principal advancements were the use of the basso continuo and the gradual adoption of a wider harmonic vocabulary, and the mass in modern style with solo voices and instrumental obbligatos. The Lutheran Michael Praetorius composed a mass for double choir in the old style, which he published in 1611 in the collection of church music for the mass in Latin, Missodia Sionia. Composers such as Henri Dumont (1610–1684) continued to compose plainsong settings, distinct from and more elaborate than the earlier Gregorian chants.

A further disparity arose between the festive missa solemnis and the missa brevis, a more compact setting. Composers like Johann Joseph Fux in the 18th century continued to cultivate the stile antico mass, which was suitable for use on weekdays and at times when orchestral masses were not practical or appropriate, and in 19th-century Germany the Cecilian movement kept the tradition alive. František Brixi, who worked at the Prague Cathedral, wrote his Missa aulica, a missa brevis in C, for four voices, trumpets, violin and continuo, "cantabile" but solo voices just singing short passages within chorale movements. The Italian style cultivated orchestral masses including soloists, chorus and obbligato instruments. It spread to the German-speaking Catholic countries north of the Alps, using instruments for color and creating dialogues between solo voices and chorus that was to become characteristic of the 18th-century Viennese style. The so-called "Neapolitan" or "cantata" mass style also had much influence on 18th-century mass composition, with its short sections set as self-contained solo arias and choruses in a variety of styles.

The 18th-century Viennese mass combines operatic elements from the cantata mass with a trend in the symphony and concerto to organize choral movements. The large scale masses of the first half of the century still have Glorias and Credos divided into many movements, unlike smaller masses for ordinary churches. Many of Mozart's masses are in missa brevis form, as are some of Haydn's early ones. Later masses, especially of Haydn, are of symphonic structure, with long sections divided into fewer movements, organized like a symphony, with soloists used as an ensemble rather than as individuals. The distinction between concert masses and those intended for liturgical use also came into play as the 19th century progressed.

After the Renaissance, the mass tended not to be the central genre for any one composer, yet among the most famous works of the Baroque, Classical, and Romantic periods are settings of the Ordinary of the Mass. Many of the famous masses of the Romantic era were Requiems, one of the most famous, A German Requiem by Brahms, being the composer's own selection of biblical texts rather than a setting of a standard liturgy.

=== 20th and 21st centuries ===
By the end of the 19th century, composers were combining modern elements with the characteristics of Renaissance polyphony and plainchant, which continued to influence 20th-century composers, possibly fueled by the motu proprio Tra le sollecitudini (1903) of Pope Pius X. The revival of choral celebration of Holy Communion in the Anglican Church in the late 19th century marked the beginning several liturgical settings of mass texts in English, particularly for choir and organ. The movement for liturgical reform has resulted in revised forms of the mass, making it more functional by using a variety of accessible styles, popular or ethnic, and using new methods such as refrain and response to encourage congregational involvement. Nevertheless, the mass in its musical incarnation continues to thrive beyond the walls of the church, as is evident in many of the 21st-century masses listed here which were composed for concert performance rather than in service of the Roman Rite.

==== Musical reforms of Pius X ====
Pope Pius X initiated many regulations reforming the liturgical music of the mass in the early 20th century. He felt that some of the masses composed by the famous post-Renaissance composers were too long and often more appropriate for a theatrical rather than a church setting. He advocated primarily Gregorian plainchant and polyphony. He was primarily influenced by the work of the Abbey of Solesmes. Some of the rules he put forth include the following:

- That any mass be composed in an integrated fashion, not by assembling different compositions for different parts.
- That all percussive instruments should be forbidden.
- That the piano be explicitly forbidden.
- That the centuries' old practice of alternatim between choir and organ be concluded immediately.
- That women must not be present in the choir.

These regulations carry little if any weight today, especially after the changes of the Second Vatican Council. Quite recently, Pope Benedict XVI has encouraged a return to chant as the primary music of the liturgy, as this is explicitly mentioned in the documents of the Second Vatican Council, specifically Sacrosanctum Concilium, paragraph 116.

==== English translations ====
English language translations were developed after the Second Vatican Council and the promotion of the use of vernacular languages in the Catholic Church. When a new translation of the Roman Missal was published in 2011, some episcopal conferences expected the new settings to be used immediately. In England and Wales, the bishops made allowance for the need for congregations to learn to sing new settings and therefore permitted the older settings to continue in use until Pentecost Sunday, 2014.

== Major works ==
=== Post-Renaissance ===
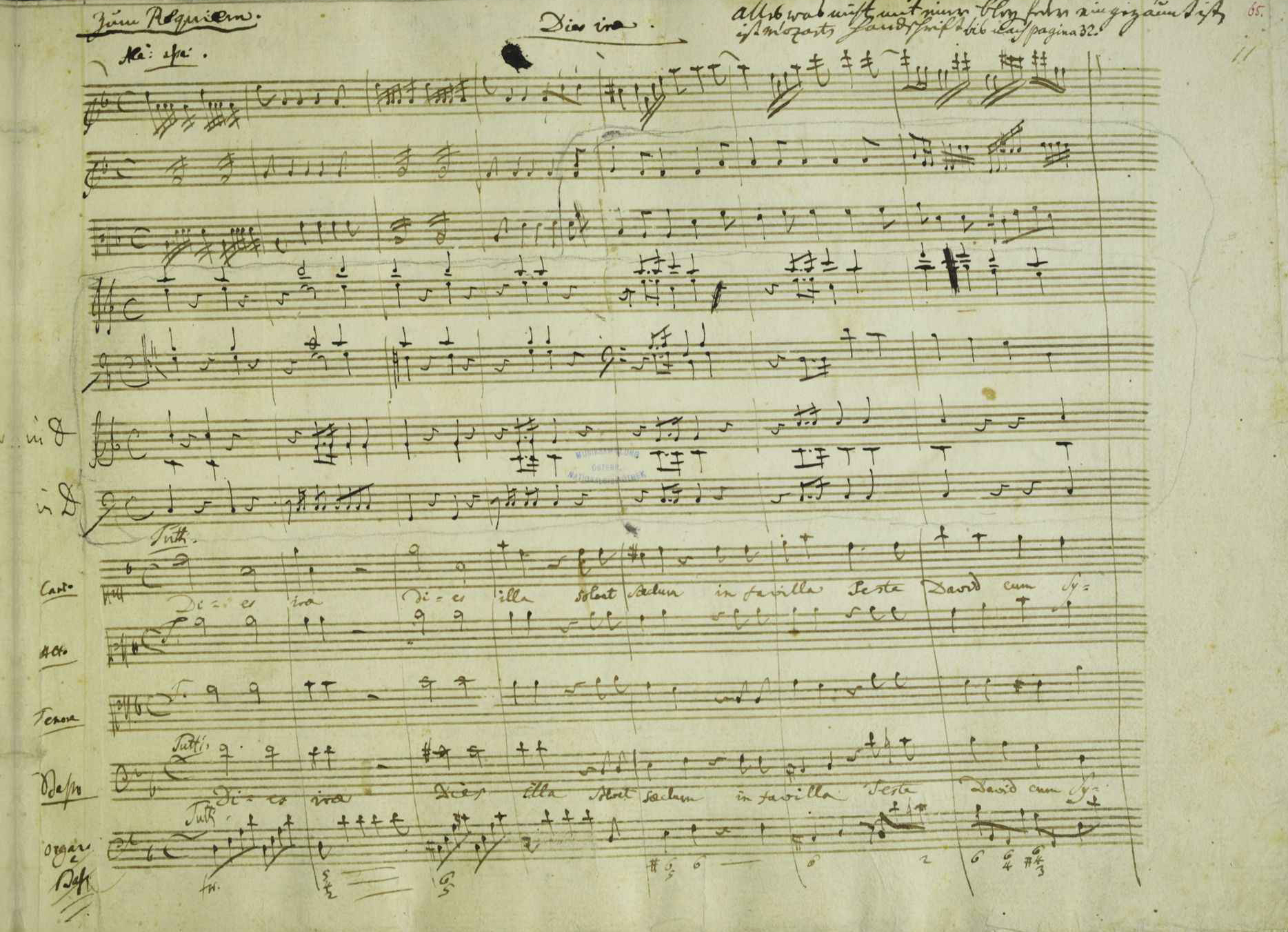
- The beginning of the Dies irae of Mozart's Requiem
  Messa Concertata by Cavalli (1656)
- Mass for double choir, from Missodia Sionia, by Michael Praetorius (1611)
- 12 masses by Marc-Antoine Charpentier (including 3 Requiem + H.12, H.311), H.1, H.2, H.3, H.4, H.5, H.6, H.7, H.8, H.9, H.10, H.11, H.513.
- Missa Scala Aretina by Francesc Valls (Barcelona, 1702)
- Mass in B minor and four Missae by Johann Sebastian Bach
- High Masses by Jan Dismas Zelenka
- Requiem by Jean Gilles
- Mass for double choir and double orchestra by Henri Desmarets
- Requiem by André Campra (1723)
- Requiem by François-Joseph Gossec (1760)
- 18 masses by W. A. Mozart, including the Great Mass in C minor (1782) and Requiem (1791)
- 14 masses by Joseph Haydn, including Nelson Mass and Mass in Time of War
- Mass in C major and Missa Solemnis in D major by Ludwig van Beethoven
- Mass in G major and 5 others by Franz Schubert
- Missa Choralis and Hungarian Coronation Mass by Franz Liszt
- Requiem by Hector Berlioz (1837)
- Mass in D minor, Mass in E minor and Mass in F minor by Anton Bruckner
- Mass in D minor, op. 10 (1866) by John Knowles Paine
- Petite messe solennelle (1863) by Gioachino Rossini
- Requiem by Giuseppe Verdi (1874)
- Cantus Missae, mass for double choir in E♭ major, Op. 109, by Josef Rheinberger (1878)
- Requiem by Camille Saint-Saëns (1878)
- St. Cecilia Mass and 13 others by Charles Gounod
- Messa by Giacomo Puccini (1880)
- Mass in E♭, Op. 5 (1886) by Amy Beach
- Requiem by Gabriel Fauré (1887)
- Mass in D major, Op. 86 (1887) by Antonín Dvořák
- Requiem in B♭ minor (1890) by Antonín Dvořák
- Mass in D by Ethel Smyth (1891)

=== 20th century ===
- Requiem by Maurice Duruflé
- Mass in G by Francis Poulenc
- Messe Solennelle by Jean Langlais
- Glagolitic Mass (1926) by Leoš Janáček
- Messe modale en septuor (1938) for soprano, alto, flute and string quartet by Jehan Alain
- Mass in G minor by Ralph Vaughan Williams
- Mass, Op. 130 (1945) for choir and brass by Joseph Jongen
- Requiem by Bruno Maderna (1946)
- Mass by Igor Stravinsky
- Mass by Leonard Bernstein
- Bộ lễ Seraphim (1960) by Paul Nguyễn Văn Hoà
- War Requiem (1962) by Benjamin Britten
- Mass for mixed chorus (1963) by Paul Hindemith
- Requiem, for soprano and mezzo-soprano solo, mixed chorus and orchestra (1963–65) by György Ligeti
- Missa Sanctae Mariae Magdalenae (1979) by William Lloyd Webber
- Mass of Creation (1984) by Marty Haugen
- Missa supra Parsifal (1985) by Dimitri Aguero
- Requiem (1990), Mass of the Children (2004), and Gloria by John Rutter
- Requiem by Andrew Lloyd Webber
- Mass in F minor by The Electric Prunes
- Mass by David Maslanka
- Mass Of The Sea, Op. 47, by Paul Patterson
- Berliner Messe and Missa Syllabica by Arvo Pärt
- Mass by Frank Martin
- A Symphonic Mass by George Lloyd
- Missa Laudate Pueri by Bertold Hummel
- At Grace Cathedral, jazz mass by Vince Guaraldi
- Mass To Hope by Dave Brubeck
- Misa Criolla by Ariel Ramírez
- Misa by Rodrigo Prats
- New Plainsong Mass by David Hurd
- Mass in Honor of St. Cecilia by Lou Harrison
- African Sanctus by David Fanshawe
- Polish Requiem by Krzysztof Penderecki
- Missa Luba by Guido Haazen
- Misa flamenca (1991) by Paco Peña
- Misa a Buenos Aires (Misatango) by Martín Palmeri (1996)

=== 21st century ===
- Missa Latina: pro Pace by Roberto Sierra
- Missa Rigensis (2002) by Uģis Prauliņš
- The Armed Man: A Mass for Peace by Karl Jenkins
- Missa Concertante (2008) by Marcus Paus
- Mass of Christ the Savior (2012) by Dan Schutte
- Street Requiem (for those who have died on the street) for choir and orchestra by Kathleen McGuire, Jonathon Welch and Andy Payne (2014)
- Missa Papae Francisci (2015) by Ennio Morricone
- Missa Lucis, a jazz mass by Justin Binek

=== Masses written for the Anglican liturgy ===
These are more often known as 'Communion Services', and differ not only in that they are settings of English words, but also, as mentioned above, in that the Gloria usually forms the last movement. Sometimes the Kyrie movement takes the form of sung responses to the Ten Commandments, 1 to 9 being followed by the words 'Lord have mercy upon us and incline our hearts to keep this law', and the tenth by 'Lord have mercy upon us and write all these thy laws in our hearts, we beseech thee'. Since the texts of the 'Benedictus qui venit' and the 'Agnus Dei' do not actually feature in the liturgy of the 1662 Book of Common Prayer, these movements are often missing from some of the earlier Anglican settings. Charles Villiers Stanford composed a Benedictus and Agnus in the key of F major which was published separately to complete his service in C.

With reforms in the Anglican liturgy, the movements are now usually sung in the same order that they are in the Roman Catholic rite. Choral settings of the Creed, the most substantial movement, are nowadays rarely performed in Anglican cathedrals.

Well known Anglican settings of the mass, which may be found in the repertoire of many English cathedrals are:

- Darke in F
- Darke in E
- Darke in A minor
- Ireland in C
- Stanford in C and F
- Stanford in B♭
- Stanford in A
- Sumsion in F
- Oldroyd, Mass of the Quiet Hour
- Jackson in G
- Howells, Collegium Regale
- Leighton in D
- Harwood in A♭
- Wood in the Phrygian mode

== See also ==
- Alternatim
- Mass in the Catholic Church

== Sources ==
- Gustave Reese, Music in the Renaissance. New York, W.W. Norton & Co., 1954. ISBN 0-393-09530-4
- Harold Gleason and Warren Becker, Music in the Middle Ages and Renaissance (Music Literature Outlines Series I). Bloomington, Indiana. Frangipani Press, 1986. ISBN 0-89917-034-X
- Lewis Lockwood, "Mass" The New Grove Dictionary of Music and Musicians, ed. Stanley Sadie. 20 vol. London, Macmillan Publishers Ltd., 1980. ISBN 1-56159-174-2
- The New Harvard Dictionary of Music, ed. Don Randel. Cambridge, Massachusetts, Harvard University Press, 1986. ISBN 0-674-61525-5
- M. Jennifer Bloxham, "Masses on Polyphonic Songs", in Robert Scherr, ed., The Josquin Companion Oxford University Press, 1999. ISBN 0-19-816335-5
- http://classicalmusic.about.com/od/theordinaryofthemass/f/gloria.htm
- Dennis Arnold, John Harper, "Mass 1600-2000" Grove Music Online. Oxford Music Online.
- Herbermann, Charles, ed. (1913). "Music of the Mass" . Catholic Encyclopedia. New York: Robert Appleton Company.
- Roche, Elizabeth and Alex Lingas. "Mass" The Oxford Companion to Music. Ed. Alison Latham. Oxford Music Online.
- Jean-Paul C. Montagnier, The Polyphonic Mass in France, 1600-1780: The Evidence of the Printed Choirbooks. Cambridge: Cambridge University Press, 2017. ISBN 978-1-107-17774-1.
