= Sine nomine =

Latin expression meaning "without a name"

Sine nomine (abbreviated s.n.) is a Latin expression, meaning "without a name". It is most commonly used in the contexts of publishing and bibliographical listings such as library catalogs, to signify that the publisher (or distributor, etc.) of a listed work is unknown, or not printed or specified on the work. It is to be compared with sine loco (s.l.), "without a place", used where the place of publication of a work is unknown or unspecified. While it may sometimes be used to disclose an unknown authorship, this is more commonly indicated as anon. or similar.

The phrase and its abbreviation have been deprecated in Anglophone cataloging with the adoption of the Resource Description and Access standard, which instead prescribes the unabbreviated English phrase "publisher not identified" (or "distributor not identified", etc.). Sine loco is likewise replaced by "place of publication not identified". Alternatively, n.p. or N.p. may sometimes also be used for "no publisher".

== See also ==
- Liber sine nomine
- Missa sine nomine, literally, a Mass without a name
