= Misa Tango =

Misa Tango or MisaTango may refer to:

- Misa Tango, 1997 work by Luis Bacalov
- Misa a Buenos Aires (Misatango), 1996 work by Martín Palmeri
