= Op. 130 =

In music, Op. 130 stands for Opus number 130. Compositions that are assigned this number include:

- Beethoven – String Quartet No. 13
- Jongen – Mass
- Schumann – Children's Ball (Kinderball) (four hands)
