= Guillaume de Van =

French musicologist

Guillaume de Van (2 July 1906 in Memphis – 2 July 1949 in Amalfi) real name William Carrolle Devan, was a French musicologist and choral conductor of American origin. A student at Princeton University, he then traveled to Rome to train in Gregorian chant. In the early 1930s, he became a choir conductor, conducting the Armenian choir in Paris. In 1935, in collaboration with the priest Ducaud-Bourget, he founded the vocal ensemble Les Paraphonistes de Saint-Jean des Matines. With this ensemble he interpreted and recorded for the first time several secular and religious vocal works of the Middle Ages. Among these works, he recorded the world premiere of Messe de Nostre Dame by Guillaume de Machaut in 1936 of which he made one of the first complete transcriptions published by the Corpus mensurabilis musicae in 1950. In 1942 he was appointed by the Vichy regime curator of the newly created département de la musique de la Bibliothèque nationale de France, until 1944. In this capacity he collaborated with the Nazi musicologists of the Sonderstab Musik. After the Liberation of France, he was suspended from his duties on 24 August 1944.

== Bibliography ==
- Sara Iglesias, Musicologie et Occupation : Science, musique et politique dans la France des « années noires », chapter Un personnage-clé : Guillaume de Van, nouveau prince et « usurpateur » de la musicologie française. 2014 éditions MSH.
