= Sart-lez-Spa =

Coordinates: 50°30′57″N 5°56′01″E

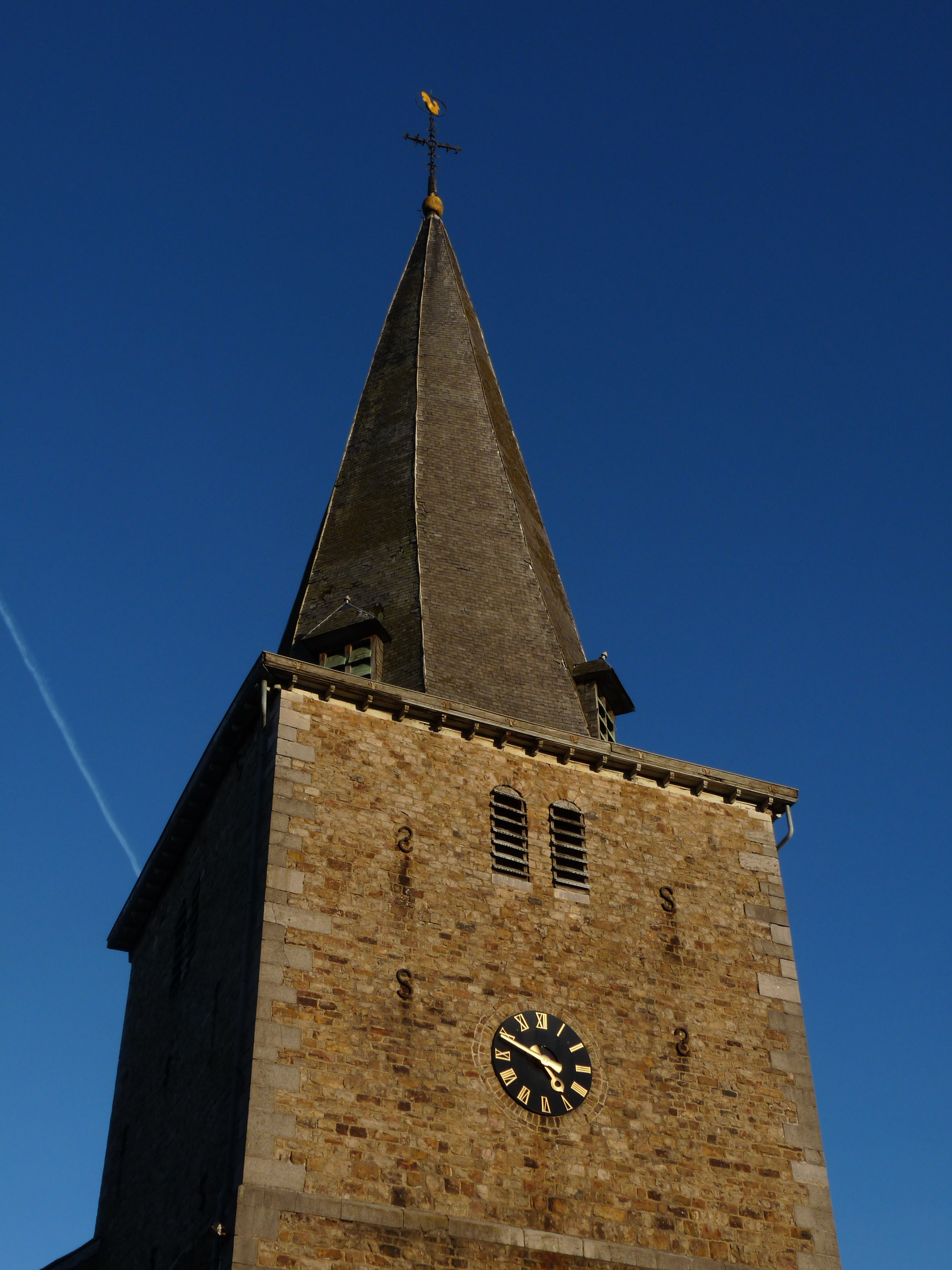
Spire of Sart-lez-Spa

Sart-lez-Spa (French pronunciation: [saʁ le spa]; Walloon: Li Sårt-dilé-Spå) is a village of Wallonia and a district of the municipality of Jalhay, located in the province of Liège, Belgium.

Nearby is the river Hoëgne, a tributary of the river Vesdre.

It was a municipality before the fusion of the Belgian municipalities in 1977.

== Heritage ==
- The market Place
- The stoop dated 1458.
- The Saint Lambert church built in 1705 and surmounted by a crooked spire.
- The old hollow oak with charred interior.
- The Lespire house dated 1616.
- The Vicar's house.
- The Bronfort house dating from the late 18th century.
- The Maquis house.

== Activities ==
The procession of Laetare celebrates the carnival in collaboration with the neighbouring village of Tiège. Since 1660, the flowering chariots of the two towns have been competing with each other and competing in beauty. The "White Dominoes" from Sart and "Black Dominoes" from Tiège animate the streets of the two villages and take the girls out of their house to dance.

Since 1976, Sart has been organising the Old Trades Festival. It takes place, in principle, every four years. The 11th edition took place in August 2013. Some 200 artisans and 500 actors animated the village.

The Belgian composer and organist Joseph Jongen wrote his Mass, Op. 130 in Sart-lez-Spa where he died on 12 July 1953.
