= Missodia Sionia =

- Collection of sacred music by Michael Praetorius
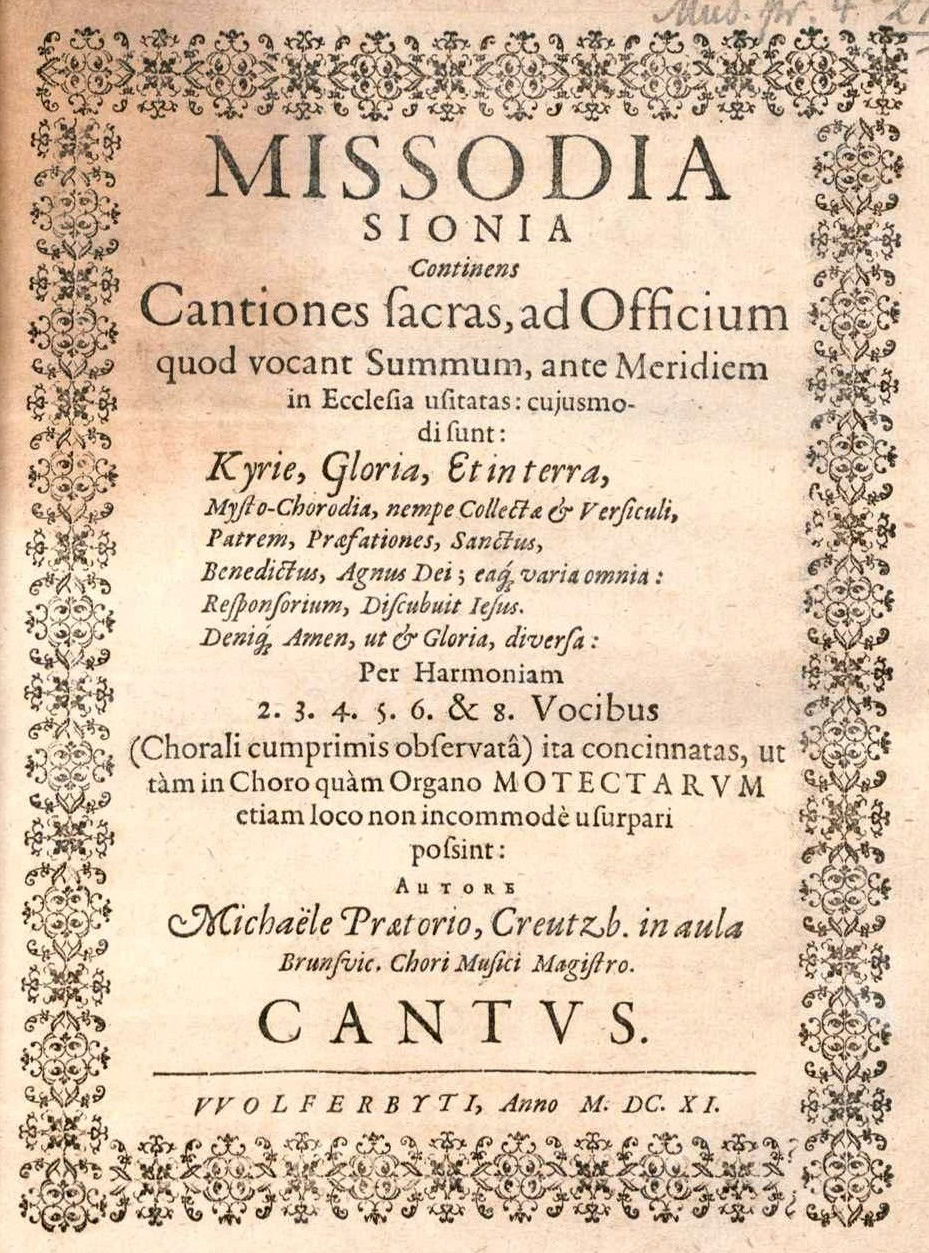
- Missodia Sionia, title page 1611
- Language: Latin
- Published: 1611: Wolfenbüttel

Missodia Sionia ("Sionian Chant of the Mass") is a collection of sacred music by Michael Praetorius, published in Wolfenbüttel in 1611. It holds music for church services on Latin texts, set for two to eight parts, including a complete mass for eight voices.

== History ==
Praetorius published 20 volumes of his collected music during his lifetime, one of them, Terpsichore containing secular French danses, the others devoted to sacred music on both German and Latin texts. The Protestant Reformers had not discarded the use of Latin liturgy in church services.

Missodia Sionia is the eleventh volume, printed in Wolfenbüttel in 1611. The content is described on the cover: "Missodia Sionia / Continens / Cantiones sacras, ad Officium / quod vocant Summum, ante meridianum)" (Zionic chants for the mass / containing / sacred songs, for the service / called the Highest / before noon), specifying Kyrie, Gloria, Et in terra, and many others, for two to eight voices. The title page also mentions that use of Gregorian chant has been observed (Chorali cumprimis observata). George J. Buelow, a scholar of Baroque music, renders it: "In two to eight parts, polyphonic settings of the Mass Ordinary, Collects, Prefaces, various Amen and Gloria intonations, and songs for Compline".

The parts of the mass are set for the different occasions of the liturgical year, and in various degree of difficulty, from two-part settings to eight parts. The first 15 pieces are set for four parts: 10 settings of Kyrie and 5 settings of Gloria. The second group of 21 pieces is scored for four to six parts: 14 settings of Kyrie and seven of Gloria. Another group (pieces 50 to 77) contains different settings of the chants around communion (Praefatio, Sanctus, Benedictus, Agnus Dei), and a complete mass for eight parts. Pieces 80 to 93 are 14 different settings of Amen in different modes and pieces 94 to 104 are ten settings of Gloria in different modes and an introit.

The monograph of the collection is held by the Bayerische Staatsbibliothek in Munich. The collection was published again by Georg Kallmeyer Verlag in 1934.

Excerpts from the collection were recorded in 2011 as an Easter Mass (Ostermesse) by the ensemble Weser Renaissance, conducted by Manfred Cordes, reconstructing with parts from the collection how a service may have sounded.
