= Misa a Buenos Aires =

1996 composition by Martín Palmeri

Misa a Buenos Aires (Misatango)
- Mass by Martín Palmeri
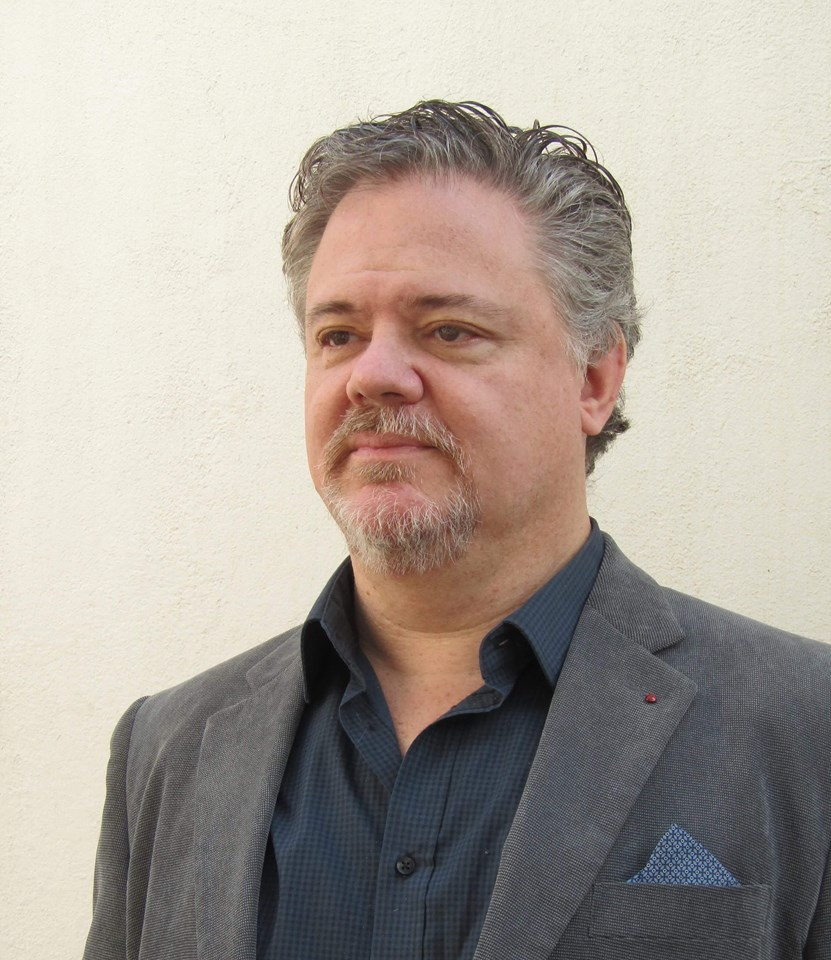
- Palmeri in 2018
- Text: Mass ordinary
- Language: Latin
- Composed: 1996
- Dedication: Théodore Dubois
- Performed: 17 August 1996
- Movements: six
- Vocal: mezzo-soprano; SATB choir
- Instrumental: bandoneon; piano; strings

The Misa a Buenos Aires, known as Misatango, is a setting of the mass in Latin by Martín Palmeri. The music uses the style of the nuevo tango and its typical instrumentation, scored for mezzo-soprano, mixed choir and an ensemble of bandoneon, piano and strings.

The work takes around 40 minutes to perform.

== History ==
Palmeri has been active as a composer, choral conductor, pianist and arranger of tango music. He wrote the mass, beginning in 1995, combining influences from his varied background.

The world premiere was given on 17 August 1996 at the Avenida Theatre in Buenos Aires by the Orquesta Sinfónica Nacional de Cuba conducted by Fernando Álvarez; the work was dedicated to the performing choirs, two choirs that Palmeri conducted: the Choir of the Law Faculty of the University of Buenos Aires and the Polyphonic Choir of the City of Vicente López.

It has been performed and recorded internationally, often with the composer as the pianist, and is regarded as his signature work.

== Music, structure and scoring ==
The Latin text of the mass is divided in six movements:

1. Kyrie
2. Gloria
3. Credo
4. Sanctus
5. Benedictus
6. Agnus Dei

The composition uses the melodic style, rhythms and instrumentation of the nuevo tango, following the model of Astor Piazzolla, but includes elements from the history of church music, such as extended fugues in the opening and closing movements.

== Performances ==
Palmeri has often played the piano part in performances, in Argentina, Austria, Belgium, Brazil, Chile, Czech Republic, Ecuador, Germany, Israel, Italy, Lithuania, Latvia, Netherlands, Russia, Slovakia, Spain, Switzerland and the U.S. In October 2013, Palmeri took part in a performance of the Kölner Domchor and members of the Gürzenich Orchestra with Bernarda Alba from Argentina, conducted by Eberhard Metternich, at a concert to honour at Sant'Ignazio di Loyola in Campo Marzio. The concert was the opening of the 12 edition of the International Festival of Sacred Music and Art; the 12th edition was dedicated to Pope Francis who had been cardinal in Buenos Aires before. The performance garnered the work international popularity.

The mass was performed on 18 January 2015 in an international production with several choirs in Carnegie Hall, New York City.

== Recordings ==
- 1997: Liepāja Symphony Orchestra, INTIS chamber choir of Liepāja, Fernando Alvarez (cond.), Alejandra Malvino (mezzo-soprano), Martín Palmeri (piano), Pablo Mainetti (bandoneon), Fonocal 05
- Martín Palmeri: Misatango. The New Baroque Times Voices, Astoria, Phillipe Gerard. Antarctica (2020)
