= Missa sine nomine =

A Missa sine nomine, literally a "Mass without a name", is a musical setting of the Ordinary of the Mass, usually from the Renaissance, which uses no pre-existing musical source material, as was normally the case for Mass compositions. Not all Masses based on freely composed material were so named, but many were, particularly from the late 15th century through the 16th century.

One of the earliest examples of a Missa sine nomine is by Guillaume Dufay, (Bologna, International museum and library of music, Ms Q15) whose Missa Resvelliés vous (formerly known as a Missa sine nomine) dates from before 1430, and possibly as early as 1420. It may have been written for the wedding of Carlo Malatesta and Vittoria di Lorenzo in Rimini.

Many other composers wrote Missae sine nomine, including Walter Frye, Barbingant, Alexander Agricola, Johannes Tinctoris, Matthaeus Pipelare, Heinrich Isaac, Pierre de La Rue, Josquin des Prez, Jean Mouton, Vincenzo Ruffo, and others.

Some Missae sine nomine, i.e. based on freely-composed material, were actually named in other ways: the most famous is Giovanni Pierluigi da Palestrina's Missa Papae Marcelli (“Pope Marcellus Mass”), which according to a somewhat exaggerated legend, persuaded the Council of Trent not to ban polyphonic writing in liturgical music. Also, many canonic Masses are literally sine nomine: the Missa prolationum of Johannes Ockeghem and the Missa ad fugam of Josquin des Prez are of this type, as is the late Missa sine nomine by Josquin, in which he returns with new insight to compositional problems he first tackled in his early Missa ad fugam.

A myth dating from around the Council of Trent was that a Missa sine nomine hid a secular tune, and listeners were expected to “get the joke”; however, the practice of writing Masses on freely composed material predated the Council and the Counter-Reformation.

== 20th century ==
In 1977, Leon Schidlowsky composed a work that he called Misa Sine Nomine and dedicated to the Chilean human rights activist Victor Jara; the text is a juxtaposition of part of the mass ordinary with both Bible verses in Hebrew and contemporary texts, and he wrote it for different combinations of narrator, choirs, organ and percussion.
