= Mass (Stravinsky) =

Composition by Igor Stravinsky

Original cover to the vocal score of the mass, published by Boosey & Hawkes

Igor Stravinsky composed his Mass between 1944 and 1948. This 19-minute setting of the Roman Catholic Mass exhibits the austere, Neoclassic, anti-Romantic aesthetic that characterizes his work from about 1923 to 1951. The Mass also represents one of only a handful of extant pieces by Stravinsky that was not commissioned. Part of the motivation behind its composition has been cited by Robert Craft and others as the product of a spiritual necessity, as Stravinsky intended the work to be used functionally.

== History ==
"My Mass was partly provoked by some Masses of Mozart that I found at a secondhand store in Los Angeles in 1942 or 1943. As I played through these rococo-operatic sweets-of-sin, I knew I had to write a Mass of my own, but a real one."

— Igor Stravinsky to Robert Craft

Stravinsky completed the Gloria on December 20, 1944 and finished the Kyrie at about the same time. His work on the Mass was then interrupted for several years in which his wrote his Symphony in Three Movements, Ebony Concerto, Concerto in D, and the ballet Orpheus. He resumed work on it in the fall of 1947 and completed it March 15, 1948.

On February 26, 1947, Irving Fine conducted the Kyrie and Gloria, accompanied by two pianos. The first complete performance occurred on October 27, 1948 in Milan. Ernest Ansermet conducted members of the chorus and orchestra of La Scala.

== Orchestration ==
The work is scored for mixed chorus and an ensemble of wind instruments comprising two oboes, English horn, two bassoons, two trumpets, and three trombones. There is also some minor solo material (often sung by members of the choir) in the second and fourth (Gloria and Sanctus) movements. Stravinsky specifies in the score that "children's voices should be employed" for both the soprano and alto parts, but, as with Stravinsky's Symphony of Psalms, concert performances of the Mass usually employ adult singers.

== Structure ==
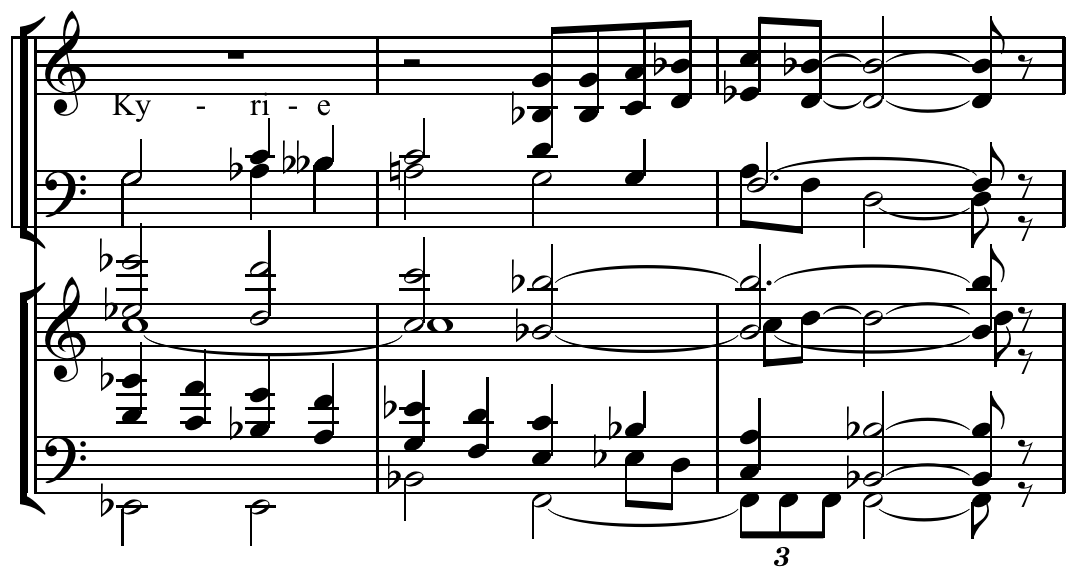
Polyvalency in Stravinsky's Mass.

Like Stravinsky's 1955 work Canticum Sacrum, the Mass forms a symmetrical plan on a large scale. The outer movements (the Kyrie and Agnus Dei) contain homophonic choral statements with instrumental interludes and share a tonal vocabulary including octatonic, diatonic, and modal scales. By contrast, the second and fourth movements (the Gloria and Sanctus) feature florid solo lines which alternate with the choral statements, and the harmony is more recognizably and consistently diatonic. The central movement, the Credo, is the longest. It features static, syllabic, and declamatory text-setting with a limited harmonic and rhythmic vocabulary.

The final movement, Agnus Dei, obeys tradition of allowing for repeats by using a double wind quintet ritornello to break up vocal parts, essentially meaning the movement can start over as many times as necessary. Long stretches of text often repeat a single chord, evoking the reciting tone of Gregorian chant or the Orthodox liturgical chant that Stravinsky would have known from his childhood in Saint Petersburg. Clear setting of the text is favored over an expressive interpretation of its meaning, as is the tradition for conservative mass music. The music features examples of polyvalency.

== Faith ==
Stravinsky chose to compose this Roman Catholic Mass despite his own Orthodox faith. He stated that this was because:

I wanted my Mass to be used liturgically, an outright impossibility as far as the Russian Church was concerned, as Orthodox tradition proscribes musical instruments in its services- and as I can endure unaccompanied singing in only the most harmonically primitive music.

Stravinsky also said of the Credo:

One composes a march to facilitate marching men, so with my Credo I hope to provide an aid to the text. The Credo is the longest movement. There is much to believe.

== Recordings ==
Below is a list of recordings—ordered alphabetically by conductor—of the Mass as of 2016.

- Ančerl, Karel, dir. 1967 (re-released 2004). Stravinsky: Les Noces/Mass/Cantata, from Ančerl Gold Edition 32. Czech Philharmonic Orchestra & Prague Philharmonic Choir. Supraphon 3692, CD.
- Bernstein, Leonard, dir. 1988. Stravinsky: Les Noces/Mass. English Bach Festival Chorus & Orchestra, and the Trinity Boys Choir. Deutsche Grammophon 20th Century Classics ADD 0289-423-2512-8-GC, compact disc.
- Craft, Robert, dir. 2006. Stravinsky: Symphony of Psalms/Three Russian Sacred Choruses/Mass/Cantata/Babel. The Gregg Smith Singers, Orchestra of St. Luke, and Philharmonia Orchestra. Naxos 8.557504, compact disc.
- Davis, Colin, dir. 1963 (re-released 2007). Stravinsky: Cantata/Mass. English Chamber Orchestra, and St. Anthony Singers. Deutsche Grammophon ADD 0289-475-8716-3-DH, compact disc.
- Ferguson, Duncan, dir. 2016. Stravinsky: Choral Works. Choir of St Mary's Cathedral, Edinburgh. Delphian Records Ltd DCD34164, compact disc.
- Gay, Laurent, dir. 2001. Stravinsky: Mass - Symphony of Psalms. Orchestre du Festival Amadeus and Ensemble Vocale La Psallette de Geneve. Paul Sutin Productions
- Herreweghe, Philippe, dir. 2010. Igor Stravinsky: Monumentum/Mass/Symphonie de Psaumes, J.S. Bach/Stravinsky: Choral-Variationen. Collegium Vocale Gent, and the Royal Flemish Philharmonic. Pentatone Classics PTC 5186349, compact disc.
- Higginbottom, Edward, dir. 2005. Twentieth Century Masters · Volume 3: Copland and His American Contemporaries. Choir of New College Oxford and instrumentalists. Avie AV2086, compact disc.
- Leeuw, Reinbert de, dir. 1999. Stravinsky: Sacred Choral Works. Netherlands Chamber Choir, and the Schönberg Ensemble. Philips 454477, compact disc.
- Marlow, Richard, dir. 1995. Stravinsky: Mass & Gesualdo: Responsoria. The Choir of Trinity College, Cambridge, London Musici. Conifer 51232, compact disc.
- O’Donnell, James, dir. 1993. Stravinsky: Symphony of Psalms/Mass/Canticum Sacrum. The Choir of Westminster Cathedral, and City of London Sinfonia. Hyperion CDA 66437.
- Preston, Simon, dir. 2008. Stravinsky: Symphony of Psalms/Canticum Sacrum/Mass, Poulenc: Motets. Christ Church Cathedral Choir, Philip Jones Wind Ensemble, London Sinfonietta. London Decca 430346, compact disc.
- Reuss, Daniel, dir. 2006. Stravinsky: Les Noces/Mass/Cantata. RIAS Kammerchor and musikFabrik. harmonia mundi HMC 801913, compact disc.
- Stravinsky, Igor, dir. 1960/2007. Works of Igor Stravinsky. Columbia Symphony Orchestra, and Gregg Smith Singers. Sony-BMG 88697–103112, compact disc. [22-disc box set, Mass recording on CD #20]
- Stravinsky, Igor, dir. 1950. Double Wind Quintet and Chorus of Men and Boys, Warren Foley, chorus master, mono recording, "HMV" La Voix De Son Maitre FBLP 1012, RCA Victor Red Seal LM-17
