= Order of Mass =

Outline of a Mass celebration

Order of Mass is an outline of a Mass celebration, describing how and in what order liturgical texts and rituals are employed to constitute a Mass.

The expression Order of Mass is particularly tied to the Roman Rite where the sections under that title in the Roman Missal also contain a set of liturgical texts that recur in most or in all Eucharistic liturgies (the so-called invariable texts, or ordinary of the Mass), while the rubrics indicate the rituals, and the insertion points of the variable texts known as the proper of the Mass. Having been virtually unchanged for many centuries, the Roman Catholic Order of Mass changed decisively after the Second Vatican Council.

The term Order of Mass is used in the Lutheran Churches.

Other Christian denominations have comparable descriptions of their liturgical practices for the Eucharist, which are however usually not called Order of Mass.

== Catholicism ==
=== Roman Rite ===
In the Roman Missal, the Order of Mass is printed as a distinct section placed in the middle of the book, between the Mass of the Easter Vigil and that of Easter Sunday in pre-1970 editions, and between the Proper of the Seasons and the Proper of the Saints thereafter.

In a Catholic tradition Order of Mass (Latin: Ordo Missae) is sometimes used as a synonym of Ordinary of the Mass (Ordinarium Missae), but the last expression usually rather refers to the Ordinarium parts of the Mass, i.e. the Mass ordinary, the set of texts of the Roman Rite Mass that are generally invariable. This contrasts with the proper (proprium), which are items of the Mass that change with the feast or following the Liturgical Year.

==== Pre-Tridentine Mass ====
Before the Roman Missal of 1570 the Order of Mass was less uniform but by 1000 AD many sections of the Tridentine Mass were already established as part of the Mass.

==== Tridentine Mass ====
The Order of Mass for the Tridentine Mass appears in Roman Missals from 1570, until it was replaced by the Order of Mass as published in the Roman Missal of 1970.

==== Mass of Paul VI ====
Many prayers have been shortened and/or alternative versions of texts of the ordinary can be chosen.

=== Eastern Rites ===
The Eastern churches generally follow similar traditions distinct from but analogous to Western practice. The 23 sui iuris Eastern Catholic Churches, celebrate the Eucharist in ways only accidentally different from the Western Church.

==== Byzantine Rite ====
In the Byzantine Rite the Eucharist is called Divine Liturgy, which has several versions, with the Divine Liturgy of St. John Chrysostom coming closest to an equivalent of the Order of Mass in the Western traditions.

== Lutheranism ==
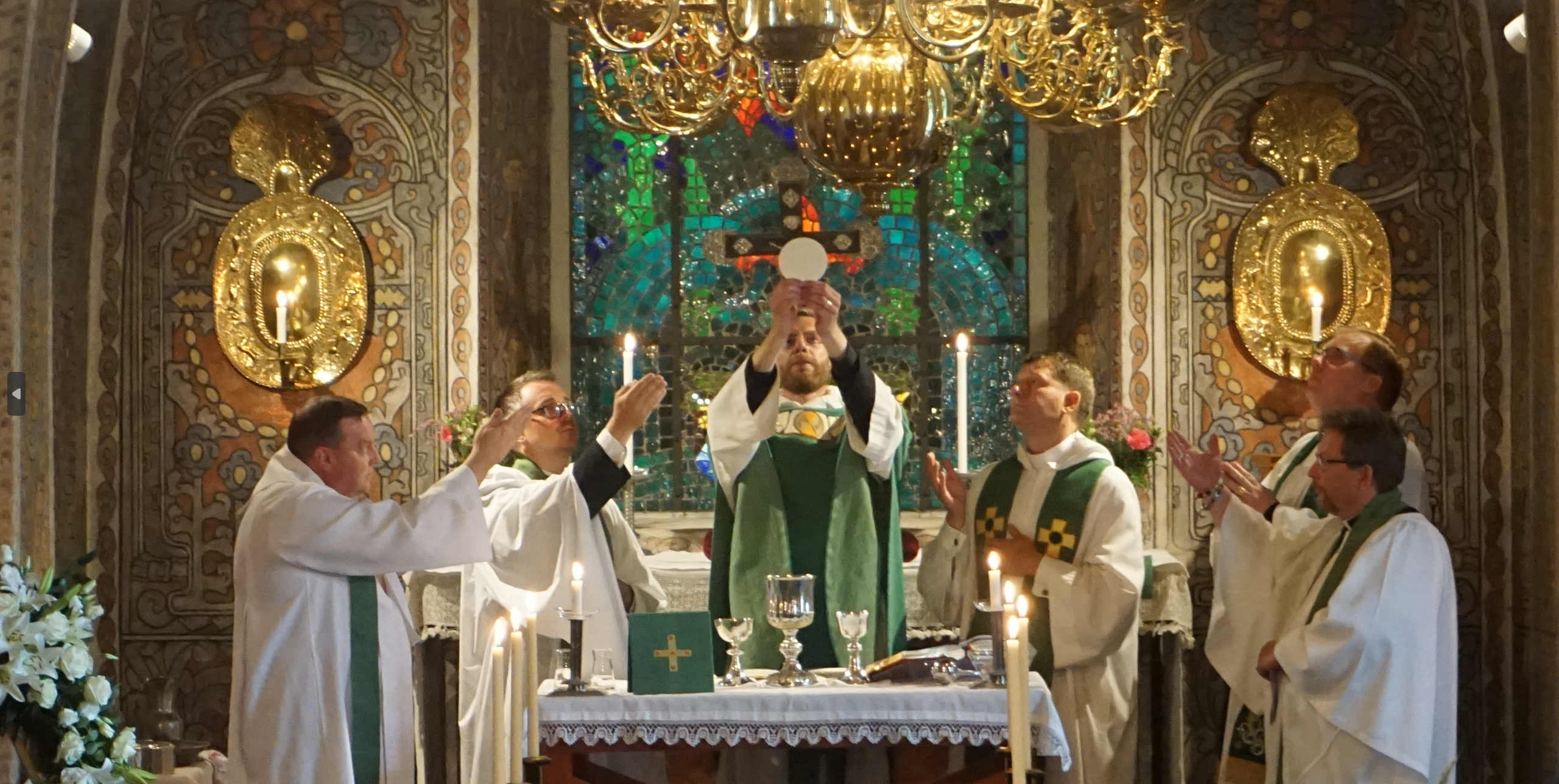
Lutheran priest elevating the host during the Mass at Alsike Church, Sweden

In the Lutheran Churches, the Order of Mass takes the following form:

- Introit
- The Preparation for Mass
- The Absolution
- Prayer of Thanksgiving
- Kyrie Eleison
- Gloria and Laudamus
- Collect of the Day
- Old Testament reading
- Responsorial Psalm
- Epistle reading
- Gradual
- Alleluia
- Gospel reading
- Sermon
- Nicene Creed
- Notices (e.g. Banns of marriage)
- Intercessions
- Offertory
- Eucharistic Prayer
  - Sursum Corda
  - Preface
  - Sanctus
- Lord's Prayer
- Fraction
- Pax
- Agnus Dei
- Prayers before Communion
- Holy Communion
- Prayer of Thanksgiving
- Benedicamus Domino
- Blessing of the Faithful
- Dismissal

The Order of Mass produced under the liturgical reforms of the Lutheran divine Olavus Petri, expanded the anaphora from the Formula Missae, which liturgical scholar Frank Senn states fostered "a church life that was both catholic and evangelical, embracing the whole population of the country and maintaining continuity with pre-Reformation traditions, but centered in the Bible's gospel."

== Anglicanism ==
Traditionally in Anglicanism the Book of Common Prayer, compiled under the auspices of the Protestant reformer Thomas Cranmer, is the guide for liturgical practices regarding the Eucharist.

However various revisions have taken place throughout the Anglican Communion during the 20th and 21st Century, with most provinces creating a liturgy with a close resemblance to the western tradition. For example, until the retranslation of the Roman Catholic English Order of the Mass, the Church of England Common Worship liturgy was almost identical to the Roman Catholic Ordo except for some differences in wording in the Eucharistic prayers, though with the substantive elements identical the notable difference being that the peace follows the intercessions, not the Eucharistic Prayer.
