= Joseph Jongen =

Belgian organist and composer (1873–1953)

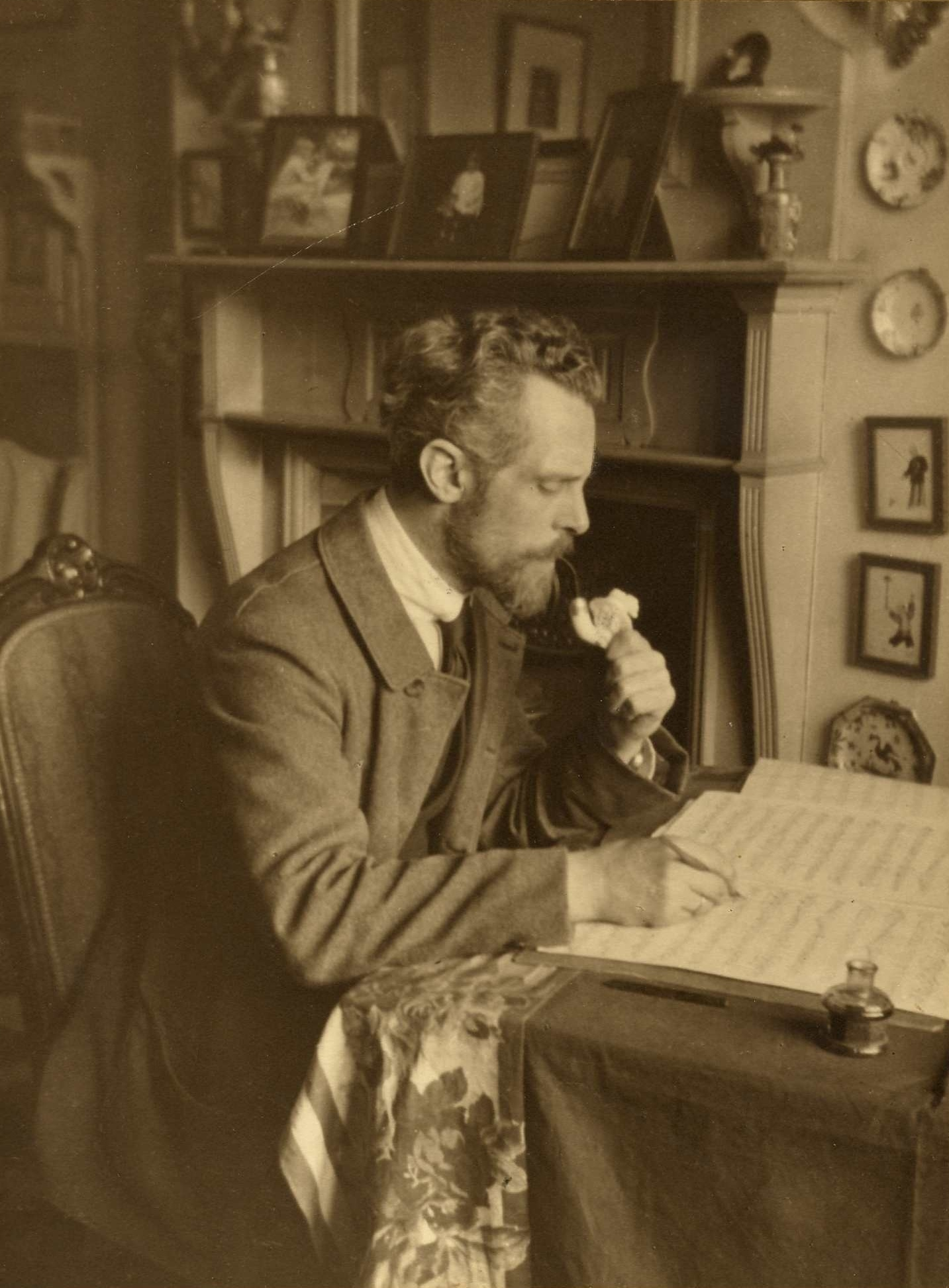
- Photograph of Joseph Jongen
- Born: Joseph Marie Alphonse Nicolas Jongen; 14 December 1873; Liège
- Died: 12 July 1953 (aged 79); Sart-lez-Spa
- Education: Liège Conservatoire
- Occupations: Organist; Composer; Academic
- Organizations: Liège Conservatoire; Royal Conservatory of Brussels
- Awards: Prix de Rome; Order of Leopold II; Royal Academy of Science, Letters and Fine Arts of Belgium

Joseph Marie Alphonse Nicolas Jongen (14 December 1873 – 12 July 1953) was a Belgian organist, composer, and music educator.

== Biography ==
Jongen was born in Liège, where his parents had moved from Flanders. He was the elder brother of Léon Jongen. Because of his precocity for music, he was admitted to the Liège Conservatoire at age of seven and spent the next sixteen years there. Jongen studied composition with Jean-Théodore Radoux. In 1892 he was awarded the gold medal in the piano competition, and later that same year he joined the organ class of Charles-Marie Danneels. He won a First Prize for Fugue in 1895, an honors diploma in piano the next year, and another for organ in 1896.

Jongen had been composing since the age of 13, and by the time he published his opus 1 - the Concerto Symphonique (1892) - he already had dozens of works to his credit. His opus 3, the monumental and massive First String Quartet, was composed in 1894, and it won the top prize in an annual competition for fine arts held by the Royal Academy of Belgium.

In 1897, he won the Belgian Prix de Rome, which allowed him to travel to Italy, Germany and France over a four year period, during which (among many others) he encountered Richard Strauss, Vincent D'Indy and Florent Schmitt. In 1902 he returned to Belgium, and in 1903 he was named a professor of harmony and counterpoint at his old Liège college. With the outbreak of World War I, he and his family moved to England, where he founded a piano quartet with violinist Désiré Defauw, violist Lionel Tertis, and cellist Émile Doehaerd. His String Quartet No 2, op. 50, was composed there in 1916. After the end of the war, he returned to Belgium and was named professor of fugue at the Royal Conservatory of Brussels. From 1925 until 1939, he served as director of that institution and was succeeded by his brother Léon.

Fourteen years after leaving the directorship, Joseph Jongen died at Sart-lez-Spa, Belgium.

== Compositions ==
From his teens into his seventies, Jongen composed a great deal, including symphonies, concertos (for cello, for piano and for harp), chamber music (notably a late string trio and three string quartets), and songs, some with piano, others with orchestra. (His list of opus numbers eventually reached 241, but he destroyed many pieces, leaving 137 in the official catalogue.) Today, the only part of his oeuvre performed with regularity are his organ works, much of it solo, some in combination with other instruments.

Jongen's early works were influenced by César Franck and his school. Lord Berners, in a short essay he wrote on Jongen for publishers J & W Chester in 1922, praises the String Quartet No 2 (1916) for its blend of "purity of form, beauty of writing and emotional appeal", and the 1918 Suite en forme de Sonate for piano as "a delightful example of modern music based on old forms".

Jongen's monumental Symphonie Concertante, op. 81 of 1926 is a tour de force, considered by many to be among the greatest works ever written for organ and orchestra. Numerous eminent organists of modern times (such as Virgil Fox, Alexander Frey, Jean Guillou, Michael Murray, Diane Meredith Belcher, Stephen Tharp, and Olivier Latry) have championed and recorded it. The work was commissioned by Rodman Wanamaker for debut in the Grand Court of his palatial Philadelphia department store, Wanamaker's. Its intended use was for the re-dedication of the world's largest pipe organ, the Wanamaker Organ, as part of a series of concerts Rodman Wanamaker funded with Leopold Stokowski and the Philadelphia Orchestra. Wanamaker's death in 1928 precluded performance of the work at that time in the venue for which it was written, but it was finally performed for the first time with the Wanamaker Organ and the Philadelphia Orchestra on 27 September 2008.

In 1945, Jongen composed the Mass, Op. 130, for choir, brass and organ, in memory of his brother Alphonse.

== Honours ==
- 1919: Officer of the Order of Leopold.
- 1932 : Commander of the Order of Leopold.
- 1934 : Grand Officer in the Order of Leopold II.
- Member of the Royal Academy of Science, Letters and Fine Arts of Belgium
