= Ivrea Codex =

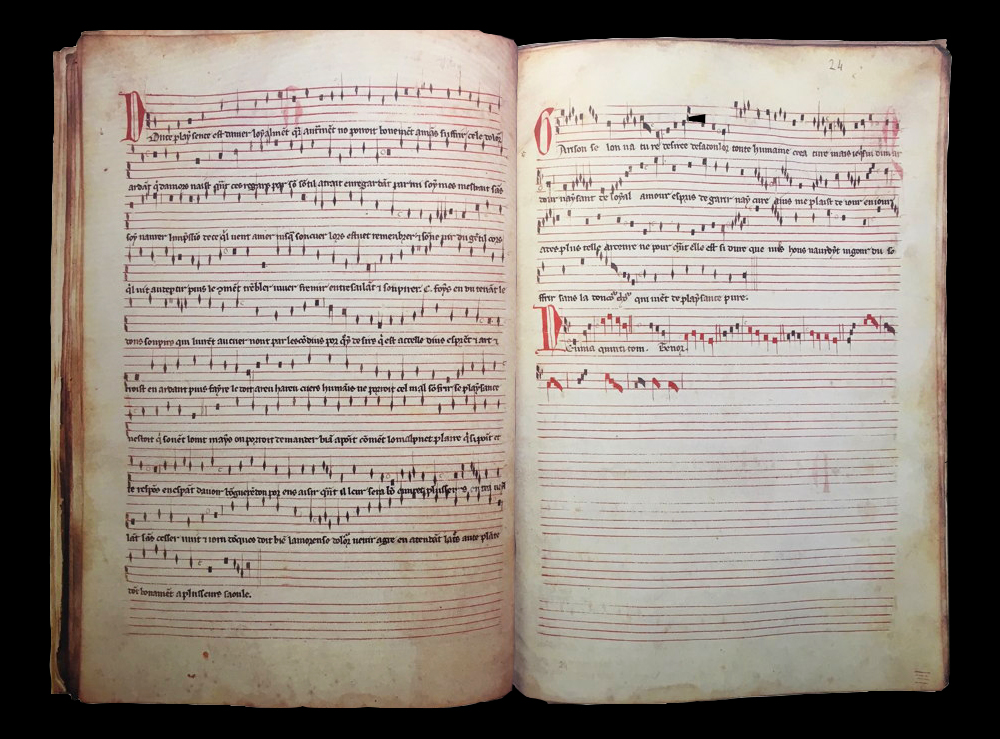
Excerpt from the 14th-century Ivrea Codex containing the tenor voice of Philippe de Vitry's Douce playsence est d’amer loyalment/Garison selon nature desire de sa doulor.

The Ivrea Codex (Ivrea, Biblioteca Capitolare, 115) is a parchment manuscript containing a significant body of 14th century French polyphonic music.

The codex contains motets, Mass movements, and a handful of virelais, chaces, and ballades, composed in the middle of the 14th century. The notation is characteristic of the Ars Nova period. The manuscript is missing at least one gathering of Mass movements.

The provenance of the codex is disputed. It was long thought to have been compiled in Avignon, the seat of the French Papacy, around 1370. However, the musically important court of Gaston Fébus has also been suggested. Most recently, however, Karl Kügle has asserted that the source was made in Ivrea itself, by musicians connected to the Savoyard court (possibly Jehan Pellicier), in the 1380s or 1390s. None of these three interpretations has become universally accepted.

All of the music in the codex is anonymous, but attributions have been made on the basis of concordances to Philippe de Vitry, Guillaume de Machaut, Magister Heinricus, Bararipton, Depansis, Matheus de Sancto Johanne, Orles, Sortes, and Loys. One piece attributed to Chipre is probably of Cypriot provenance. Kügle notes that ars subtilior-style compositions are absent from the source; however, sources without ars subtilior compositions far outnumber those containing these pieces, so it is hard to read particular significance into this statement.
