= Ite, missa est =

Concluding phrase of Roman Rite liturgy

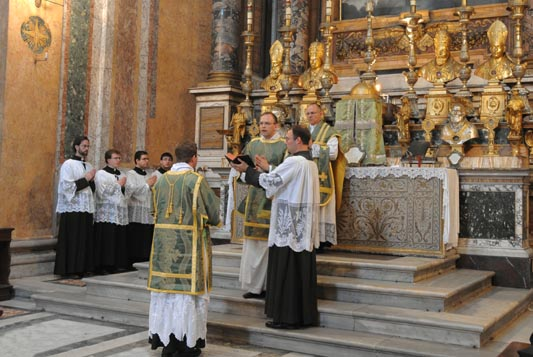
"Ite, missa est" sung by the deacon at a Solemn Mass

Ite, missa est ('Go, it is the dismissal') are the concluding Latin words addressed to the people in the Mass of the Roman Rite in the Catholic Church, as well as in the Divine Service of the Lutheran Church. Until the reforms of 1962, at Masses without the Gloria, Benedicamus Domino was said instead.

The response of the people (or, in the Tridentine Mass, of the servers at Low Mass, the choir at Solemn Mass) to either of the above is Deo gratias ("thanks be to God").

== Meaning ==
In the 19th century, it was common to explain the phrase elliptically, with missa the feminine participle of mittere, as in Ite, missa est [congregatio] "Go, it [viz., the assembly] is dismissed". However, according to Fortescue (1910), the word missa as used in this phrase is not the feminine participle (Classical Latin missa), but rather a Late Latin form of what would be missio in classical Latin, meaning "dismissal", for a translation of "Go, the dismissal is made".

Chupungco (1999) noted that "some persons have attempted" to "sublimate" the straightforward meaning of the phrase into an interpretation of missio "dismissal" as "mission" (as in, "go and be a missionary"), but judges this interpretation as "without foundation".

The connection between the meaning "dismissal" and the 'deeper' meaning of "mission" was also discussed by Benedict XVI (without making an etymological claim) in Sacramentum caritatis (2007): "In antiquity, missa simply meant 'dismissal'. In Christian usage, however, it gradually took on a deeper meaning. The word 'dismissal' has come to imply a 'mission'. These few words succinctly express the missionary nature of the Church".

Historically, there have been other explanations of the noun missa, i. e. as not derived from the formula ite, missa est. Medieval authors took the phrase to contain the noun missa "mass". Thus Guillaume Durand (13th century) suggests that the meaning is either elliptic missa est [finita] "the mass is finished", or that est should be taken absolutely, as meaning "the mass exists, is now accomplished fact". But, in fact, the ecclesiastical Latin noun missa "mass" is itself derived from the missa in this liturgical formula.

Also, Du Cange (1678) reports "various opinions on the origin" of the noun missa "mass". Fortescue (1910) cites more "fanciful" etymological explanations, notably a latinization of Hebrew matsâh (מַצָּה) "unleavened bread; oblation", a derivation favoured in the 16th century by Reuchlin and Luther.

== History and liturgical use ==
It is one of the oldest formulae of the Roman Rite, recorded in Ordo I (6th or 7th century). but if the noun missa "mass" is to be taken as a derivation from this formula, it must predate the 6th century and may date to as early as the 3rd, missa being a re-adoption into written Latin of the spoken Late Latin for missio.

After the twelfth century, accretions began to be added to the Mass after the "Ite, missa est", changing it from a dismissal to a mere formula without relation to actuality. But only in the sixteenth century, with the establishment of the Tridentine Mass (Missal of Pope Pius V), were these accretions officially accepted as part of the Mass.

In this revision of the Roman Missal, the ”Ite, missa est” was followed by a silent private prayer by the priest, then by the blessing, and finally by the reading of what was called the Last Gospel (usually John 1:1–14, but since, until the reform of Pope Pius X, saints' feasts came to supplant most Sunday Masses, the Last Gospel on such Sundays was that of the Sunday Mass).

With the reform of Pope Paul VI "Ite, missa est" returned to its function as a dismissal formula. It is omitted if another liturgical function follows immediately and the people are not to leave (e.g., Benediction of the Blessed Sacrament).

"Ite missa est", not being variable like the Scripture readings and the Collect, is part of the Order of Mass and has always been printed in that part of the Roman Missal. Being sung by an individual (ideally the deacon), not by a choir, it cannot be part of a polyphonic musical setting of the Mass. Only the "Deo gratias" response could be set polyphonically but again, because of its brevity, it rarely was, except in some early settings such as Machaut's Messe de Nostre Dame.

From the Easter Vigil until the Second Sunday of Easter, and on Pentecost Sunday, "alleluia, alleluia" is appended to both the dismissal and its response.

== Alternative formulas ==
=== Patristic Era ===
- Apostolic Constitutions: "Go in peace."

=== Modern Roman Rite ===
In 2008 alternative dismissal formulas were approved for Mass of the Roman Rite:

- "Ite in pace" (Go in peace)
- "Ite ad Evangelium Domini nuntiandum" (Go and announce the Gospel of the Lord)
- "Ite in pace, glorificando vita vestra Dominum" (Go in peace, glorifying the Lord by your life)
- Go forth, the Mass is ended

In each case the response called for by the Roman Missal continues to be "Deo gratias" (Thanks be to God).

=== Non-Roman Latin rites ===
The dismissal formulas in other Latin liturgical rites are:

- Ambrosian Rite: "Procedamus cum pace" (Let us go forth in peace). Response: "In nomine Christi" (In the name of Christ).
- Mozarabic Rite: "Solemnia completa sunt in nomine D. N. I. C: votum nostrum sit acceptum cum pace" (The celebration is completed in the name of Our Lord Jesus Christ; may our prayer be accepted with peace). Response: "Deo gratias" (Thanks be to God).
- Aquileian Rite: "Ite benedicti et electi in viam pacis: pro vobis Deo Patri hostia missa est." (Go blessed and elect in the way of peace: for you the sacrificial victim has been sent to God the Father.)
- Aquileian Rite: "Ite benedicti et electi in viam pacis: pro vobis Mariae Filius hostia missa est." (Go blessed and elect in the way of peace: for you the sacrificial victim, the Son of Mary, has been sent.)

=== Eastern Rites ===
- Antiochene, Alexandrian and Byzantine liturgies: "Let us go forth in peace" (said by the deacon). Response: "In the name of the Lord." Then the priest says a short "prayer of dismissal".

=== Other languages (Roman Rite) ===
- Latvian: "Dieva žēlastība lai jūs pavada" (May the grace of God accompany you)
- Polish: "Idźcie w pokoju Chrystusa" (Go in the peace of Christ)

== See also ==
- List of Latin phrases
