= Martín Palmeri =

Argentinian composer and conductor (born 1965)

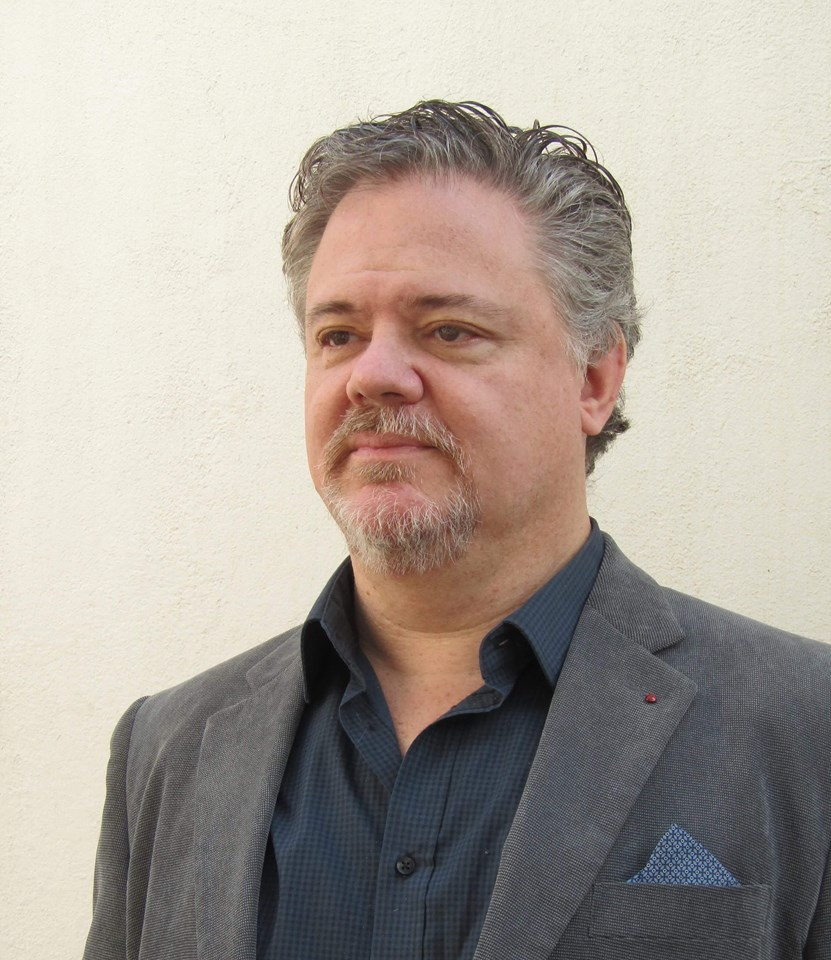
Palmeri in 2018

Martín Palmeri (born 1965) is an Argentine composer and conductor.

== Early life and education ==
Palmeri was born in 1965 in Buenos Aires. He has trained in orchestral conducting, choral direction, composition, piano, and singing.

== Work ==
His 1996 Misa a Buenos Aires, known as Misatango, combines the Roman Catholic Latin mass with music of the tango, in the nuevo tango genre. It was first performed by the National Symphony Orchestra of Cuba, and was the opening piece for the 2013 International Festival of Sacred Music and Art in Rome, featuring Argentine singer Bernarda Fink, three bandoneons and the choir of Cologne Cathedral.

His other works include:

- Tango del Bicentenario (Bicentenary Tango)
- Canto de la lejanía (Song of Distance) (2010)
- Oratorio de Navidad (Christmas Oratorio), (2003)
- Mateo, an opera (1999)
- Fantasía tanguera (Tango fantasy) (2000)
- Presagios (Portents) (2001)
- Concierto para bandoneón (Bandoneon concerto) (2004)
- Concierto de danzas (Dance concerto)
- Negro y negro (Black and black)
- Sobre las cuatro estaciones (On the four seasons) (2004/2012)
- Magnificat (2012)
- Tango Gloria (2014)
- Amor América (2014)
- La Creación (2016)
- Tango Credo (2017)
- Laudate Pueri (2017)
- La Pasión según Astor (2021)
