= Ordinary (liturgy) =

Part of the liturgy of some Christian denominations

The ordinary, in Catholic and Lutheran liturgy, refers to the part of the Mass or of the canonical hours that is reasonably constant without regard to the date on which the service is performed. It is contrasted with the proper, which is that part of these liturgies that varies according to the date, either representing an observance within the liturgical year, or of a particular saint or significant event, or to the common which contains those parts common to an entire category of saints such as apostles or martyrs.

The ordinary of both the Mass and the canonical hours does, however, admit minor variations following the seasons (such as the omission of "Alleluia" in Lent and its multiple additions in Eastertide). These two are the only liturgical celebrations in which a distinction is made between an ordinary and other parts. It is not made in the liturgy of the other sacraments or of blessings and other rites.

In connection with liturgy, the term "ordinary" may also refer to Ordinary Time – those parts of the liturgical year that are neither part of the Easter cycle of celebrations (Lent and Eastertide) nor of the Christmas cycle (Advent and Christmastide), periods until the Second Vatican Council and General Roman Calendar of 1969 were known as "Season after Epiphany" and "Season after Pentecost", respectively.

Also, the term "ordinary liturgy" is used to refer to regular celebrations of Christian liturgy, excluding exceptional celebrations.

== Mass ==
The Mass ordinary (Latin: Ordinarium Missae), or Ordinary of the Mass, or the ordinarium parts of the Mass, is the generally invariable set of texts of the Mass according to Western Christian liturgical rites such as the Roman Rite and the Lutheran Rite. This contrasts with the proper (proprium) which are items of the Mass that change with the feast or following the Liturgical Year. Ordinary of the Mass may refer to the ordinarium parts of the Mass or to the Order of Mass (which includes the proprium parts).

=== I. Kyrie ===
Kyrie eleison ("Lord, have mercy") is the first section of the Mass ordinary.

=== II. Gloria ===
Gloria ("Glory to God in the highest"). The Gloria is reserved for Masses of Sundays, solemnities, and feasts, with the exception of Sundays within the penitential season of Lent (to which, before 1970, were added the Ember Days occurring four times a year, and the pre-Lenten season that began with Septuagesima), and the season of Advent (when it is held back as preparation for Christmas). It is omitted at weekday Masses (called ferias) and memorials, and at requiem and votive Masses, but is generally used also at ritual Masses celebrated on occasions such as the administration of another sacrament, a religious profession or the blessing of a church. On May 22, 2019, Pope Francis altered part of the Gloria in Italy, changing from "Peace on earth to people of goodwill" to "Peace on Earth to people beloved by God." The changes, which were first approved by the General Assembly of the Episcopal Conference of Italy, are part of the third edition of the Roman Missal.

=== III. Credo ===
Credo ("I believe in one God"), the Nicene Creed, is said on Sundays and at major feasts. The Apostles' Creed may substitute for it during Lent and Easter and at children's Masses, but some countries have received permission to retain the Nicene Creed during the entire liturgical year.

=== IV. Sanctus ===
Sanctus ("Holy, Holy, Holy"), the second part of which, beginning with the word "Benedictus" ("Blessed is he"), was often sung separately after the Consecration if the setting was long.

=== V. Agnus Dei ===
Agnus Dei ("Lamb of God").

=== VI. Ite, missa est ===
The phrase Ite, missa est ("Go, it is the dismissal", referring to the congregation) is the final part of the Ordinarium in the post-Tridentine Mass.

== Canonical hours ==
The ordinary of the canonical hours consists chiefly of the psalter, an arrangement of the Psalms distributed over a week or a month. To the psalter are added canticles, hymns, and other prayers.

Traditionally the canonical hours were chanted by the participating clergy. Some texts of the canonical hours have been set to polyphonic music, in particular, the Benedictus, the Magnificat, and the Nunc dimittis.
