= Credo =

Creed as used in the Mass

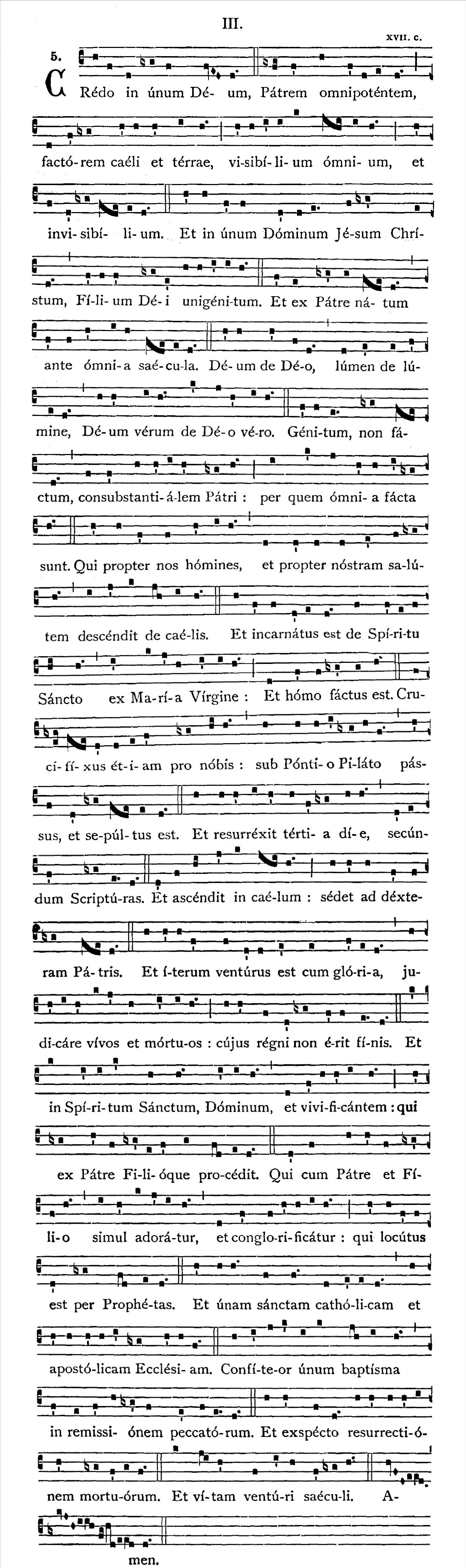
Credo III in The Liber Usualis

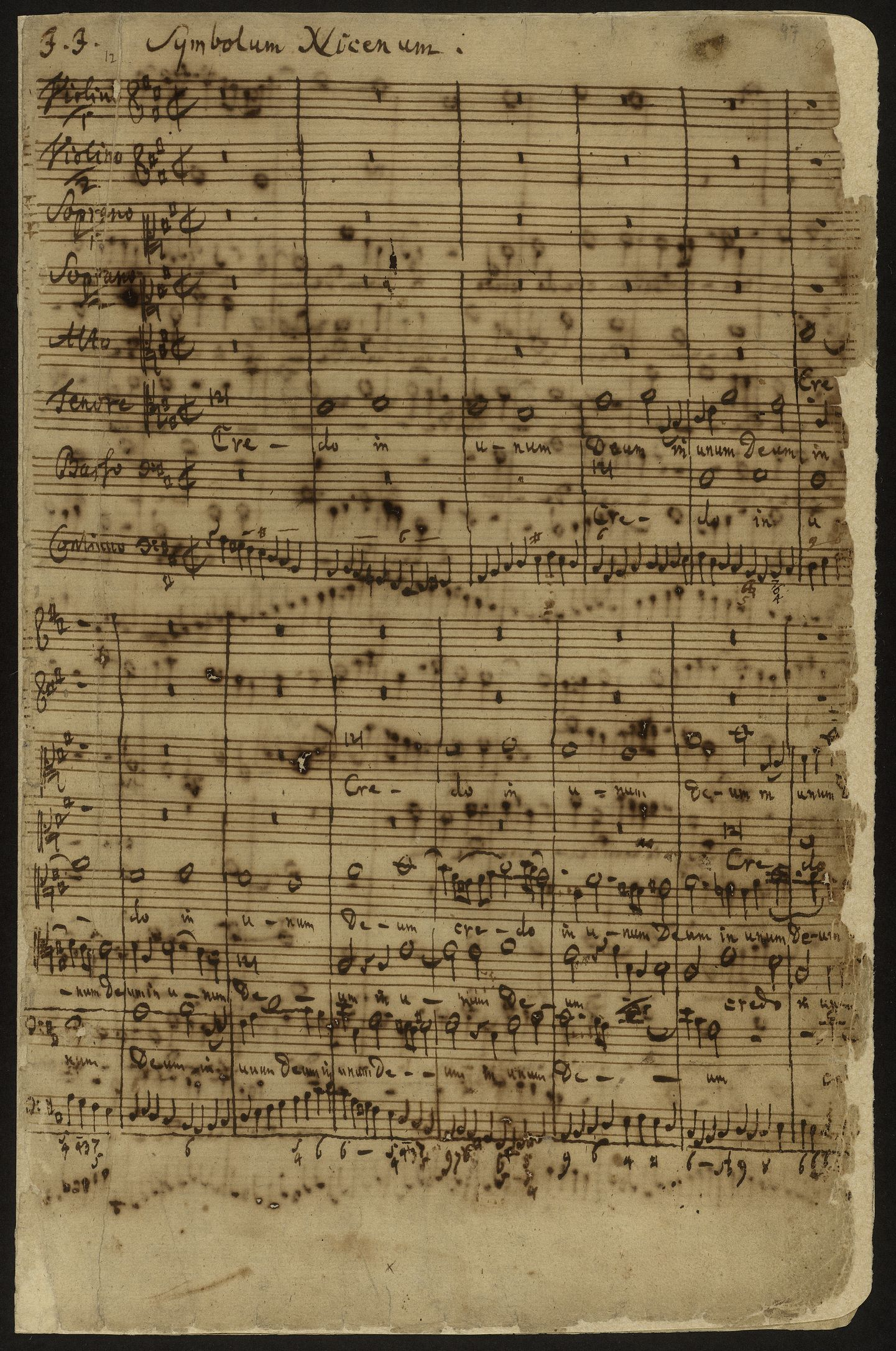
An example: the autograph first page of the Symbolum Nicenum (the Credo) from Johann Sebastian Bach's Mass in B minor

In Christian liturgy, the credo (Latin: [ˈkreːdoː]; Latin for "I believe") is the portion of the Mass where a creed is recited or sung. The Nicene-Constantinopolitan Creed or the Apostles' Creed are the primary creeds used for this purpose.

== History ==
After the formulation of the Nicene Creed, its initial liturgical use was in baptism, which explains why the text uses the singular "I ..." instead of "we ...". The text was gradually incorporated into the liturgies, first in the east and in Spain, and gradually into the north, from the sixth to the ninth centuries. In 1014 it was accepted by the Church of Rome as a legitimate part of the Mass. It is recited in the Western Mass directly after the homily on all Sundays and solemnities; in modern celebrations of the Tridentine Mass as an extraordinary form of the Roman Rite, the Credo is recited on all Sundays, feasts of the I class, II class feasts of the Lord and of the Blessed Virgin, on the days within the octaves of Christmas, Easter, and Pentecost, and on the "birthday" feasts of the apostles and evangelists (including the feasts of St. Peter's Chair and of St. Barnabas). It is recited in the Orthodox Liturgy following the Litany of Supplication on all occasions.

Probably because of its late adoption, and the length of the text (the longest in the Ordinary of the Mass), there are relatively few chant settings of it. What is identified as "Credo I" in the Liber Usualis was apparently widely considered the only authentic Credo, and it is the element of the ordinary that was most strongly associated with a single melody. The Liber Usualis contains only two other settings, designated as "Credo V" and "Credo VI," which is far fewer than for other settings of the Ordinary.

In musical settings of the Credo, as in the Gloria, the first line is intoned by the celebrant alone (Credo in unum Deum), or by a soloist, while the choir or congregation joins in with the second line. This tradition continued through the Middle Ages and Renaissance, and is even followed in more recent settings. In Stravinsky's Mass, for example, a soloist intones the first line, which is from the plainchant Credo I. In Mass settings of the Baroque, Classical and Romantic period the Credo line is usually set for whole choir, such as in the Symbolum Nicenum (Nicene Creed) of Bach's Mass in B minor, where the composer uses plainchant as the theme for a fugue, in the later Masses of Haydn, and the Missa Solemnis of Beethoven.

The melody of Credo I first appears in eleventh-century manuscripts, but it is believed to be much older, and perhaps Greek in origin. It is almost entirely syllabic, probably because of the length of the text, and consists of a great deal of repetition of melodic formulas.

In polyphonic settings of the Mass, the Credo is usually the longest movement, but is usually set more homophonically than other movements, probably because the length of the text demanded a more syllabic approach, as was seen with chant as well. A few composers (notably Heinrich Isaac) have set Credos independently from the rest of the ordinary, presumably to allow their insertion into missae breves or their omission where a said or chanted Credo is the custom.

== Musical settings ==
Settings of alternative texts as a Credo outside the Mass, as a motet, are extremely rare. The first published polyphonic settings of the Symbolum Apostolorum were settings by the French composer Le Brung in 1540, and two further settings by the Spanish composer Fernando de las Infantas in 1578.

== See also ==
- Creed
- Mass ordinary § III. Credo
