= Agnus Dei =

Christian prayer

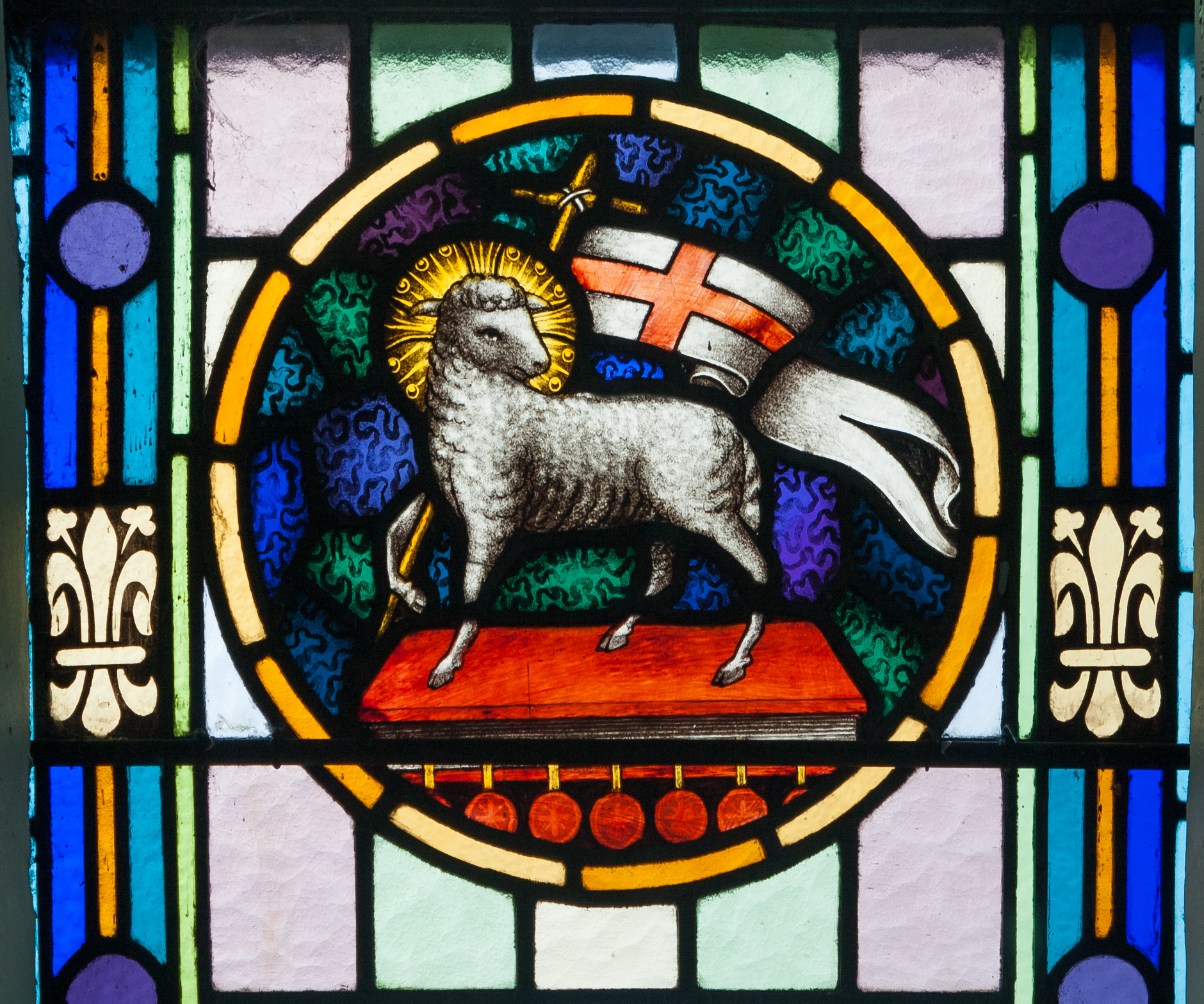
Jesus represented as the Lamb of God (Agnus Dei)

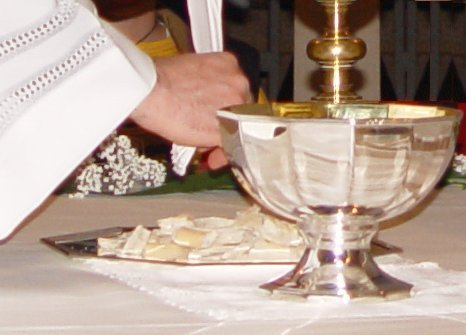
The fraction rite at which the Agnus Dei is sung or said

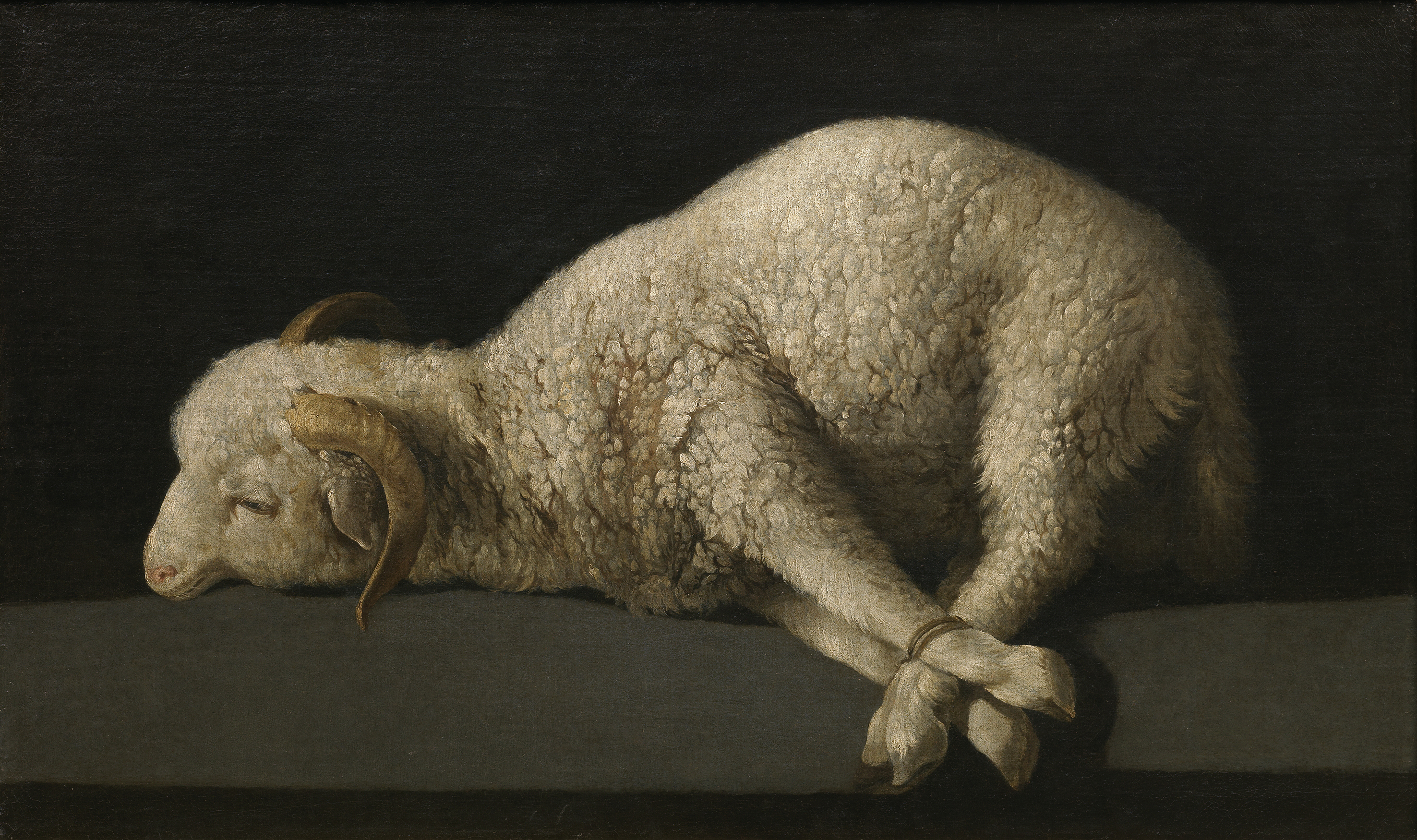
Jesus represented as the Lamb of God by Francisco de Zurbarán

Agnus Dei ('Lamb of God') is the Latin name under which Jesus is honoured within Christian liturgies descending from the historic Latin liturgical tradition, including those of Catholicism, Lutheranism and Anglicanism. It is the name given to a specific prayer that occurs in these liturgies, and is the name given to the music pieces that accompany the text of this prayer.

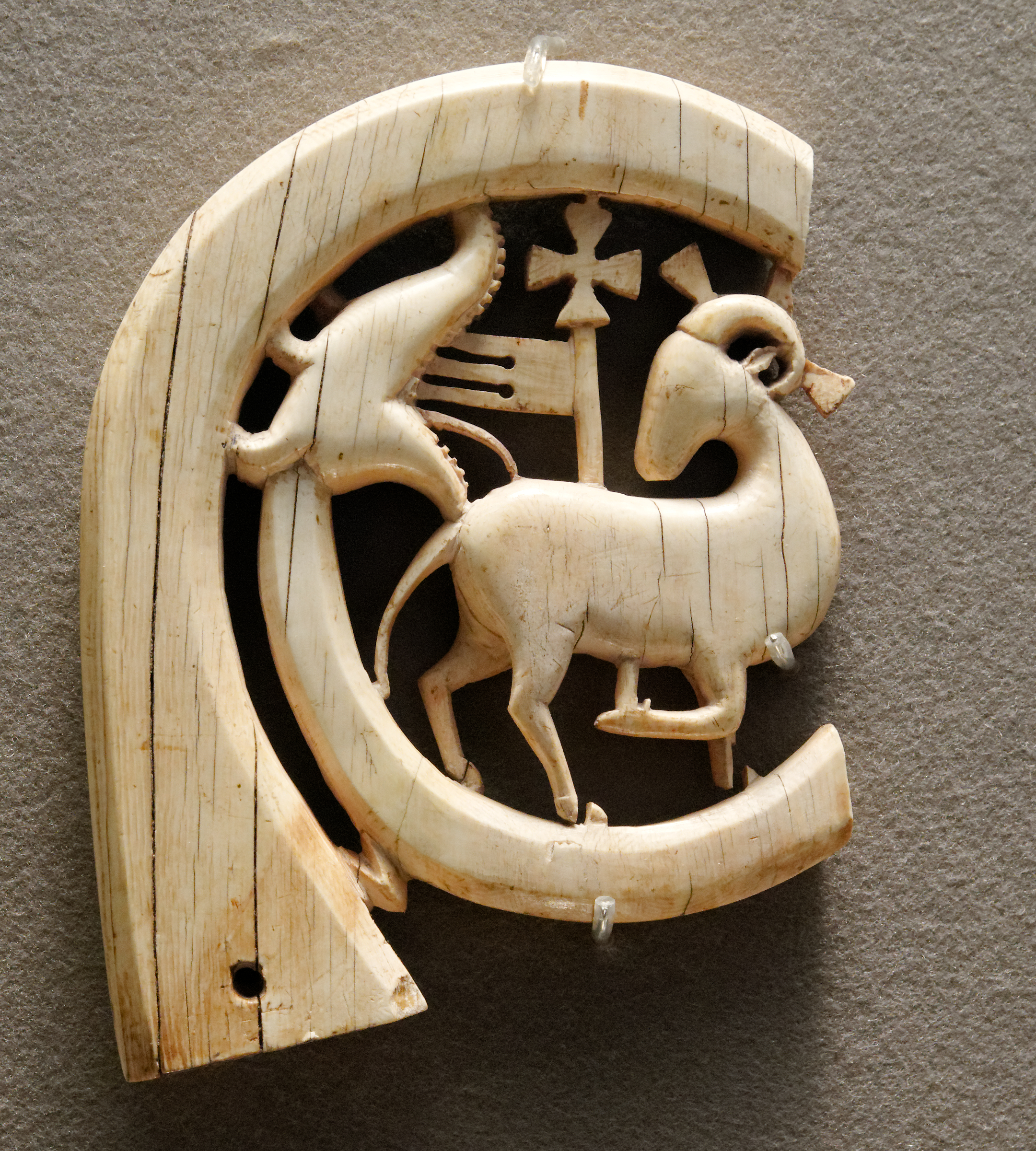
13th century ivory carving, Louvre.

The use of the title "Lamb of God" in liturgy is based on John 1:29, in which John the Baptist, upon seeing Jesus, proclaims "Behold, the Lamb of God, who takes away the sin of the world!"

Agnus Dei from Schubert's Mass No. 2

== Liturgical usage ==
=== Latin Catholic ===
The Syrian custom of a chant addressed to the Lamb of God was introduced into the Roman Rite Mass by Pope Sergius I (687–701), in the context of his rejection of the Council of Trullo of 692 (which was well received in the Byzantine East), whose canons had forbidden the iconographic depiction of Christ as a lamb instead of a man.

Agnus Dei, qui tollis peccata mundi, miserere nobis.
Agnus Dei, qui tollis peccata mundi, miserere nobis.
Agnus Dei, qui tollis peccata mundi, dona nobis pacem.

— Latin
Translation:

Lamb of God, you take away the sins of the world,
have mercy on us.
Lamb of God, you take away the sins of the world,
have mercy on us.
Lamb of God, you take away the sins of the world,
grant us peace.

— English translation

The verse used in the first and second invocations may be repeated as many times as necessary whilst the celebrant prepares the host and wine for communion.

In a Tridentine Requiem Mass, the words miserere nobis are replaced by dona eis requiem ('grant them rest'), while dona nobis pacem is replaced by dona eis requiem sempiternam ('grant them eternal rest'). Virtually every Mass setting includes an Agnus Dei.

Agnus Dei from Fauré's Requiem

The priest uses the phrase "Lamb of God" again, later in the Mass. While displaying the Eucharistic species to the people before giving them Holy Communion, he says: "Ecce Agnus Dei, ecce qui tollit peccata mundi. Beati qui ad cenam Agni vocati sunt." ("Behold the Lamb of God, behold him who takes away the sins of the world. Blessed are those called to the supper of the Lamb.")

=== Lutheran ===
The version found in the Lutheran Service Book of the Lutheran Church–Missouri Synod is:

Lamb of God, You take away the sin of the world; have mercy on us.
Lamb of God, You take away the sin of the world; have mercy on us.
Lamb of God, You take away the sin of the world; grant us Your peace, grant us Your peace.

In celebrations of the Mass done in English, the following translation is employed by the Church of Sweden:

Lamb of God, you take away, the sin of the world, have mercy on us.
Lamb of God, you take away, the sin of the world, have mercy on us.
Lamb of God, you take away, the sin of the world, grant us peace.

=== Anglican ===
The following instances are found in the Church of England's Book of Common Prayer:

From "The Litany":

O Lamb of God: that takest away the sins of the world; Grant us thy peace.
O Lamb of God: that takest away the sins of the world; Have mercy upon us.

From "Holy Communion":

Lamb of God, Son of the Father, that takest away the sins of the world, have mercy upon us.

The following versions are found in Common Worship, the alternative Anglican liturgical resources, and also in the Episcopal Church's liturgical resources:

Lamb of God, you take away the sin of the world, have mercy on us.
Lamb of God, you take away the sin of the world, have mercy on us.
Lamb of God, you take away the sin of the world, grant us peace.

O Lamb of God, that takest away the sins of the world, have mercy upon us.
O Lamb of God, that takest away the sins of the world, have mercy upon us.
O Lamb of God, that takest away the sins of the world, grant us thy peace.

Jesus, Lamb of God, have mercy on us.
Jesus, bearer of our sins, have mercy on us.
Jesus, redeemer of the world, grant us peace.

=== Evangelical Protestants ===
A popular worship song among Evangelical Protestants is a reaction to the Lamb of God being seated on the throne in Revelation 5 by Michael W. Smith. This version is response of praise to scene, while the other liturgical versions are prayers.

The words are:

Alleluia Alleluia
For our Lord God Almighty reigns
Alleluia Alleluia
For our Lord God Almighty reigns
Alleluia Holy

Holy
Are You Lord God Almighty
Worthy is the Lamb
Worthy is the Lamb
You are Holy
[Last stanza repeats 3 times]

A Ukrainian translation was sung in 2015 in Lviv, Ukraine, during the War in Donbas at an event organized by Franklin Graham. The song was notably sung again on Easter 2022 in Lviv by a choir of Ukrainian refugees fleeing the Russo-Ukrainian War.
