= Modern completions of Mozart's Requiem =

This article lists some of the modern completions of the Requiem by Wolfgang Amadeus Mozart.

== Liturgical completions ==
For the first performance of the Requiem in Rio de Janeiro in December 1819, Austrian composer Sigismund von Neukomm constructed a movement based on material in the Süssmayr version. Incorporating music from various movements (including the "Requiem aeternam", "Dies irae", "Lacrymosa", and "Agnus Dei"), the bulk of the piece is set to the "Libera me", a responsory text traditionally sung after the Requiem Mass, and concludes with a reprise of the "Kyrie" and a final "Requiescat in pace". A contemporary of Neukomm and a pupil of Mozart's, Ignaz von Seyfried, composed his own Mozart-inspired "Libera me" for a performance at Ludwig van Beethoven's funeral in 1827.

== The "Amen" fugue ==
In the 1960s, a sketch for an "Amen" fugue was discovered, which some musicologists, including Robert Levin and Richard Maunder, believed Mozart intended as a conclusion of the sequence after the "Lacrymosa". H. C. Robbins Landon argued that the "Amen" fugue was not intended for the Requiem, but rather "may have been for a separate unfinished mass in D minor" to which the Kyrie K. 341 also belonged.

There is, however, compelling evidence placing the "Amen" fugue in the Requiem based on current Mozart scholarship. First, the principal subject is the main theme of the Requiem (stated at the beginning and throughout the work) in strict inversion. Second, the fugue is found on the same page as a sketch for the "Rex tremendae" (together with a sketch for the overture of his last opera, The Magic Flute), and thus dates from late 1791. The only instance of the word "Amen" occurring in anything Mozart wrote in late 1791 is in the Requiem sequence. Third, as Levin points out in the foreword to his completion, the addition of the "Amen" fugue at the end of the sequence would maintain an overall pattern that closes each large section with a fugue, a design that appears intentional.

Many composers attempting a Requiem completion used the sketch for the "Amen" fugue discovered in the 1960s to compose a longer and more substantial setting for concluding the sequence. In the Süssmayr version, "Amen" is set as a plagal cadence with a Picardy third (iv–I in D minor) at the end of the "Lacrymosa". Only Jones and Suzuki combined the two, ending the fugue with a variation on the concluding bars of Süssmayr's "Lacrymosa" as well as the plagal cadence.

== Completions since the late 20th century ==
Since the 1960s several composers and musicologists, usually dissatisfied with the traditional "Süssmayr" completion, have attempted alternative completions of the Requiem. Each version follows a distinct methodology for the whole requiem or only for single movements.

=== Non-musicological completions ===
Completions that did not try to emulate Mozart's style, but rather completed the requiem in the style of the editor.

- Knud Vad (2000) followed Süssmayr's completion until the "Sanctus" and "Benedictus", inserting 4 bars in piano for the "Sanctus", composing a double fugue for the Osanna with Süssmayr's theme, adding more modulations to the "Benedictus" and composing a transition back to D major.
- Gordon Kerry (2005) was commissioned by the Australian Broadcasting Corporation to write a completion. He brought new additions to the manuscript but kept the overall proportions of Süssmayr's version.
- Michael Finnissy (2011) used Süssmayr's orchestration as its basis but eliminated Süssmayr's compositions.
- Brett Abigaña (2012) revised Süssmayr's version and provided a new "Amen" fugue.
- Gregory Spears (2013) like Finnissy, included a new "Sanctus", "Benedictus", and "Agnus Dei" to replace the Süssmayr completion of those movements.

=== Partial completions ===
- Karl Marguerre (1962–2016) published an essay on Süssmayr's passages in 1962, replacing a few bars in the middle of the "Lacrymosa", "Sanctus", "Benedictus" and "Agnus Dei" with quotations from other Requiem movements, Marguerre also extended the instrumentation given by Süssmayr to include high woodwinds (oboe, clarinet, flute). His version was later republished by his granddaughter, Dorothee Heath, in 2016.
- Hans-Josef Irmen (1978) replaced the "Amen", "Sanctus", and "Agnus Dei" with parodies of Mozart's earlier works.
- Emil Bächtold (1999) makes small additions and changes to Sussmayr's completion from the "Dies Irae" to the "Hostias", having the Lacrimosa only in fragmentary form and, similarly to Maunder, dispenses the "Sanctus", "Benedictus", "Agnus Dei" and the "Communio".
- Jeannette Sorrell (2006) replaced Süßmayr's "Lacrimosa" with a new completion and completely disposed of "Sanctus" and "Benedictus".
- Giuseppe Galli (2012) rewrote the continuation of "Lacrimosa" and the entirety of "Agnus Dei", the first of which he concluded with an "Amen" fugue while incorporating parts from Maunder's completion.
- Timothy Jones (2014) followed a Levin-like approach in reworking the "Lacrimosa" and composing an extensive "Amen" fugue modeled on the "Cum Sancto Spiritu" fugue from the Great Mass in C minor, K. 427. He applied the same process to the "Sanctus" and "Osanna" fugue.
- Daniel Xia (2025) recomposed Süßmayr's additions for piano, and introduced an "Amen" fugue based on Mozart's sketch.

=== Full completions ===
- Marius Flothuis (1941) tried to repair shortcomings in Süssmayr's completion, such as the trombone solo in "Tuba mirum", use of trumpets, timpani, and trombones, and the key choice of the reprise of the "Osanna" fugue. To this end, he inserted two newly composed modulating measures between the "Benedictus" and the second "Osanna". Flothuis's completion was not published but was recorded by Jos van Veldhoven.
- Karl Marguerre (1962–2016) published an essay on Süssmayr's passages in 1962, replacing a few bars in the middle of the "Lacrymosa", "Sanctus", "Benedictus" and "Agnus Dei" with quotations from other Requiem movements, Marguerre also extended the instrumentation given by Süssmayr to include high woodwinds (oboe, clarinet, flute). His version was later republished by his granddaughter, Dorothee Heath, in 2016.
- Franz Beyer (1971–1979) revised Süssmayr's orchestration with the intention of getting closer to Mozart's style and introduced minor changes to Süssmayr's sections (e.g., slightly lengthening the "Osanna" fugue for a more conclusive-sounding ending). He preserved the two different keys of the "Osanna".
- Duncan Druce (1984–1992) opted for a rather radical approach. He made extensive changes to the orchestration focussing on the basset horns much more, retained Eybler's ninth and tenth measures of the "Lacrymosa", substantially lengthened that movement and added an extended "Amen" fugue to it. He reworked the "Osanna" fugues using Süssmayr's theme, significantly extending their length. He also rewrote the "Benedictus" using the opening theme as its starting point, elaborating on it considerably longer than probably every other version.
- Simon Andrews (1985–2016) re-worked Süssmayr's instrumentation in a rather conservative way, oftentimes preferring Eybler's additions. He changed the voice leading where he considered it wrong and extended the "Osanna" considerably. He was the first to attribute the woodwind parts of the "Introitus" to an author other than Mozart on the basis of his own manuscript analyses. For these reasons, he rewrote these parts. He also presented a totally new orchestration for the Kyrie. He published his edition and a detailed study justifying his approach on his own homepage.
- Richard Maunder (1988) took a radical approach. He rewrote the orchestration working from Mozart's autographs and eliminated Süssmayr's portions except for the "Agnus Dei" and the ending of the work ("Communio"). He recomposed the "Lacrymosa" from bar 9 onwards and incorporated a completion of the "Amen" fugue based on Mozart's sketch. For his instrumentation, he relied on instances from Mozart's late operas that he deemed appropriate.
- H. C. Robbins Landon (1991–1992) orchestrated parts of his completion using Eybler's partial work, thinking Eybler's work represents a more reliable guide of Mozart's intentions. Where Eybler left out portions of the score, he filled them in himself. For movements Eybler did not work on, he relied on Süssmayr.
- Robert Levin (1991) retained the structure of Süssmayr's orchestration and contributions while adjusting orchestration, voice leading, and other instrumental passages, trying to match the instrumentation more to the practice in Salzburg. Other notable features included the execution of the "Amen" fugue and an extension of Süssmayr's "Osanna" fugue, following models of the Great Mass in C minor, K. 427. In an interview Levin gave to Arie Vardi he claimed to have changed the traditional completion "...as little as possible, so that it is not to disturb the weight of the centuries".
- Pánczél Tamás (2006) revised Süssmayr's instrumentation. He furthermore extended the "Lacrymosa" considerably and much more radical than any other editor, adding a middle section for the soloists. He also added an extensive "Amen" fugue, and rewrote the "Benedictus" ending to lead into the "Osanna" reprise, as most completers did.
- Tom O'Drisceoil (2006) drew on Mozart's existing material and attempting to fill in the missing sections in a stylistically appropriate manner. He took into account the original manuscript and stylistic choices made by Mozart, but also incorporates elements from other composers like Bach and Handel, who influenced Mozart's later works.
- Clemens Kemme (2006–2009) rewrote the orchestration in a style closer to Eybler's, emphasizing the basset horns in particular, and reworking the "Sanctus", "Benedictus", and extended "Osanna" fugue.
- Letho Kostoglou (2010) tried to fill the blanks of Mozart's manuscript in a similar vein and rhythmic patterns in completed works; unlike Gordon Kerry, he tried to keep his completion in a very close style to Mozart's.
- Benjamin-Gunnar Cohrs (2013) provided entirely new instrumentation based on Eybler's ideas, new elaborations of the "Amen" and "Osanna" fugues, and a new continuity of the "Lacrymosa" (after bar 18), "Sanctus", "Benedictus", and "Agnus Dei", employing those bars which Cohrs speculated Mozart might have sketched himself.
- Pierre-Henri Dutron (2016) revised Süssmayr's version. He rewrote the "Sanctus" and "Benedictus" from opening themes onward and took creative liberties concerning the vocals between the chorus and soloists. Conductor René Jacobs used Dutron's completion for performances in 2016 and recorded it.
- R. C. Keitamo (2016–2018) provided a new orchestration by taking into account motivic material from other late Mozart works, reworked the "Lacrymosa", and fleshed out the "Amen" fugue. Like Maunder, this edition dispensed with Süssmayr's "Sanctus", "Osanna", and "Benedictus". For the "Agnus Dei" he opted to present a contrafactum of the Kyrie in D minor, K. 341, adapted to the Requiem's instrumentation.
- Masato Suzuki (2013/17) followed a methodology similar to Robbins Landon in relying basically on Eybler's instrumentation but elaborated further on Süssmayr's sections Eybler did not work on. The completion was commissioned by Bach Collegium Japan. Suzuki also included a short "Amen" fugue, adding a basso obbligato to Mozart's primary material from the beginning.
- Michael Ostrzyga (2017–2020) re-evaluated Süssmayr's and Eybler's addition and took into account the influence from Bach and Handel as well as from works in Mozart's environment. Involving the performers, he offers alternative performance options for the "Lacrymosa", "Sanctus" and "Benedictus". In one of these, he offers a Sanctus in D minor in order to preserve the second "Osanna" from Süssmayr's manuscript. For the "Lacrymosa", Ostryzga offers a version with Süssmayr's short cadence and another with a newly composed "Amen" fugue. The edition was commissioned by the Harvard Summer Chorus and first recorded by Florian Helgath. Subsequent recordings include one conducted by Yannick Nézet-Séguin for Deutsche Grammophon. Published by Bärenreiter in 2022, the edition is based on a source-critical edition of Mozart's surviving fragment. It allows performances of the fragment alone, of the surviving sections with their incomplete instrumentation completed, or of the fully completed work.
- Jan Groth (2017–2018) made radical changes to the orchestration and rewrote Süssmayr's compositions, completely remaking Sussmayr's instrumentation and drastically increasing the use of the trumpets and timpani. Beyond that, he also completed the Amen fugue sketch and extended Süssmayr's "Sanctus", "Benedictus" and "Agnus Dei".
- Howard Arman (2020) provides new orchestrations to the Sequence and the Offertorium, besides adding an entirely new "Lacrymosa" and "Amen" fugue based on Mozart's original sketch. He does not makes changes to the "Sanctus", "Benedictus" and "Agnus Dei", claiming that the editorial changes to those movements "...change Süssmayr’s music in a way that does not match his intentions – and come nowhere close to the intentions of Mozart". Arman recorded his version with the Akademie für Alte Musik Berlin and the Chor des Bayerischen Rundfunks. The completion was subsequently published by Carus. Arman's additions primarily concern the instrumental parts; substantial completion of the vocal material was required from bar 9 of the Lacrimosa, which concludes with his realization of the Amen fugue.

== Selected recordings ==
- Richard Maunder: Academy of Ancient Music, Academy of Ancient Music Chorus, cond. Christopher Hogwood. Florilegium, 1984.
- Duncan Druce: Schütz Choir, London Classical Players, cond. Roger Norrington. EMI/Warner Classics, 1991.
- Robert Levin: Scottish Chamber Orchestra, cond. Sir Charles Mackerras. Linn, 2003.
- Robert Levin: Atlanta Symphony Orchestra and Chamber Chorus, cond. Donald Runnicles. Telarc, 2005.
- Masato Suzuki: Bach Collegium Japan, cond. Masaaki Suzuki. BIS Records, 2015.
- Howard Arman: Akademie für Alte Musik Berlin, Chor des Bayerischen Rundfunks, cond. Howard Arman. BR Klassik, 2020.
- Michael Ostrzyga: Chorwerk Ruhr, Concerto Köln, cond. Florian Helgath. MBM Mielke Bergfeld Musikproduktion, 2020.
