= Lacrimosa =

Christian hymn used in music for Requiem

The Lacrimosa (Latin for "weeping/tearful"), is part of the Dies irae sequence in the Catholic Requiem Mass. Its text comes from the Latin 18th and 19th stanzas of the sequence.

== Text ==
Latin

Lacrimosa dies illa
Qua resurget ex favilla
Judicandus homo reus.
Huic ergo parce, Deus:
Pie Jesu Domine,
Dona eis requiem. Amen.

Translation:
English

Full of tears will be that day
When from the ashes shall arise
The guilty man to be judged;
Therefore spare him, O God,
Merciful Lord Jesus,
Grant them Eternal Rest. Amen.

== Musical settings ==
Many composers, including Mozart, Berlioz and Verdi, have set the text as a discrete movement of the Requiem.

=== Mozart's Requiem ===
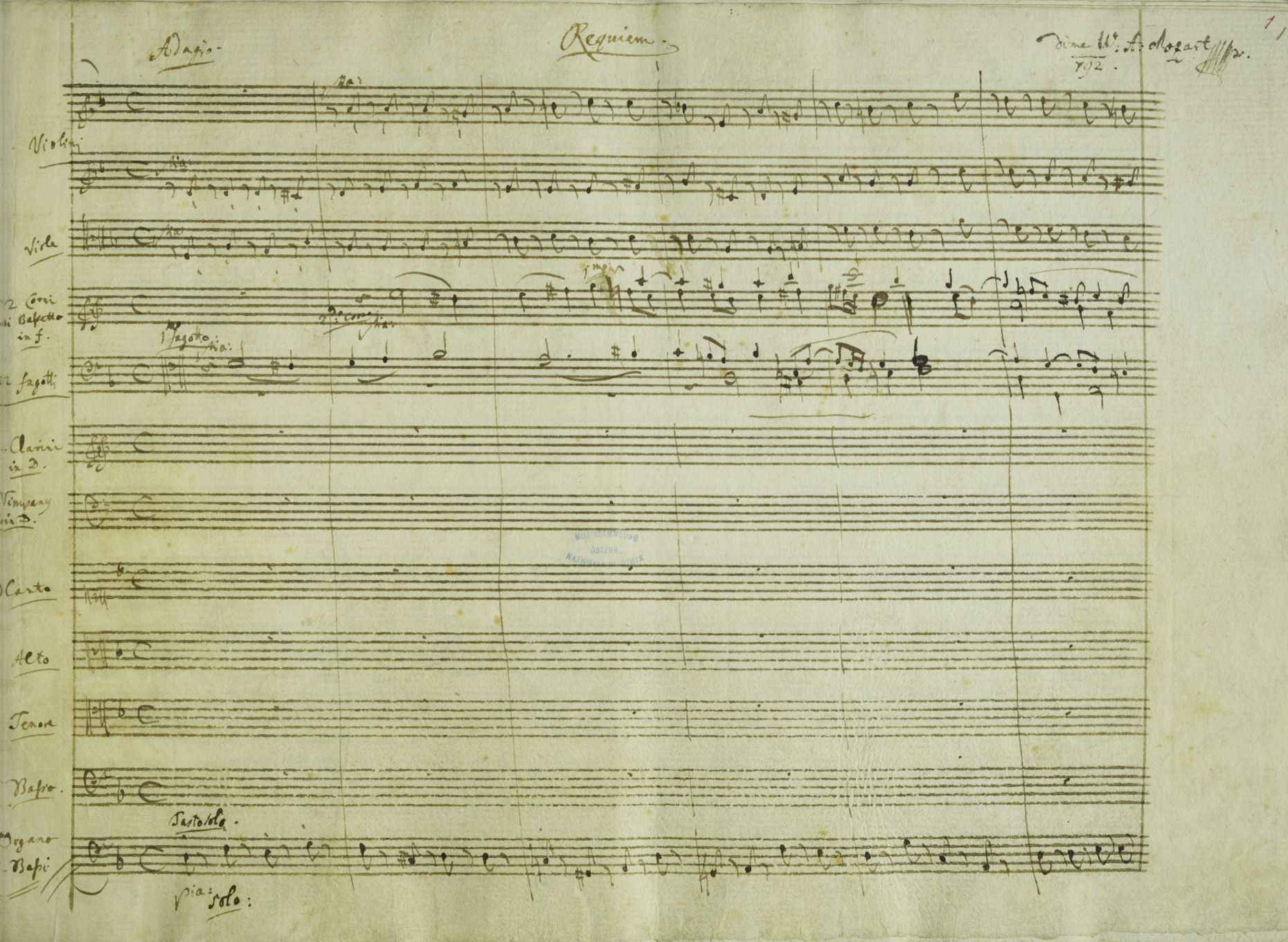
The first page as seen in Mozart's Requiem.

Lacrymosa
1956 Salzburg Festival (see above)

Mozart died leaving his Lacrimosa incomplete, and there is an ongoing debate as to whether the completion by his pupil Franz Xaver Süssmayr can be improved upon.

Süssmayr, Mozart's only composition pupil, is not generally considered to have been a very good composer, and the counterpoint needed for the requiem seems to have been a challenge for him. However, it is not denied that he did his best for Mozart's widow in allowing a completed work to be delivered. Ray Robinson, the music scholar and president (from 1969 to 1987) of the Westminster Choir College, suggests that Süssmayr used materials from Credo of one of Mozart's earlier Masses, Mass in C major, K. 220 "Sparrow" in completing this movement. Süssmayr brought the choir to a reference of the Introit and ends on an Amen cadence. Discovery of a fragmentary Amen fugue in Mozart's hand has led to speculation that it may have been intended for the Requiem. Many modern completions (such as Levin's) complete Mozart's fragment.

== Pie Jesu ==
"Pie Jesu" (/ˈpiː.eɪ ˈjeɪ.zuː, -suː/ PEE-ay-YAY-zu; original Latin: "Pie Iesu" /ˈpi.e ˈje.su/) is a text from the Lacrimosa, a hymn in the sequence "Dies irae," where it is the final (nineteenth) couplet. The couplet is often included in musical settings of the Requiem Mass as a motet. The phrase means "pious Jesus" in the vocative.

== See also ==
- Dies irae
- Requiem (Berlioz)
- Requiem (Dvořák)
- Requiem (Ligeti)
- Requiem (Mozart)
- Requiem (Verdi)
