= Sotto voce (music) =

Hushed tonal quality

In music, sotto voce (Italian for 'under the voice'; /ˈsɒtoʊ ˈvoʊtʃi, -tʃeɪ/, Italian: [ˈsotto ˈvoːtʃe]) is a dramatic lowering of the vocal or instrumental volume—not necessarily pianissimo, but a definitely hushed tonal quality.

Examples of sotto voce include:

- In Mozart's Ave verum corpus, K. 618, where it is the only dynamic marked, at the beginning of all choral and instrumental parts.
- In the sung parts in Mozart's Requiem, K. 626, particularly the Dies irae sequence:
  - In the Tuba mirum movement, during the 'sighing' line 'Cum vix justus' ('When the just may hardly (be sure)'), when the four soloists sing together for the first time. Later, the line is reprised with syncopation in forte.
  - In the Confutatis movement, during the line 'Voca me cum benedictis' ('Call me with the blessed'), sung by the soprano and alto parts in the chorus, in stark contrast with the preceding lines sung by the tenors and basses 'Confutatis maledictis, flammis acribus addictis' ('Once the cursed have been silenced, sentenced to acrid flames...').
  - In Franz Xaver Süssmayr's completion of the Lacrimosa movement. Mozart drafted the initial eight bars, starting in piano for the first three lines of the stanza, before finishing in forte after a half-bar crescendo with the lines 'judicandus homo reus' ('the guilty man who is to be judged'). Süssmayr continues on with a reprisal of the opening line 'Lacrimosa dies illa' ('Tearful (will be) that day') in sotto voce.

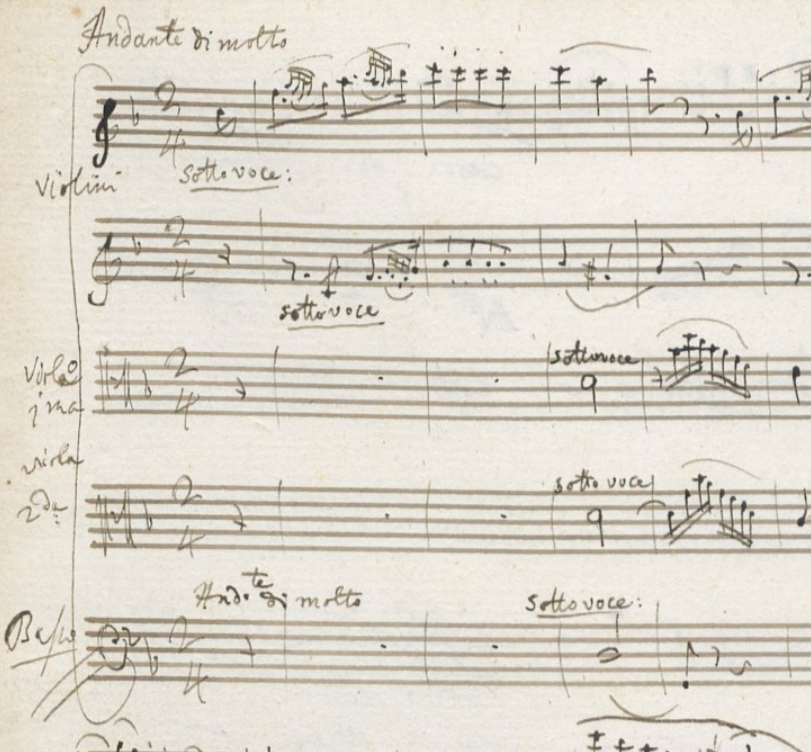
Autograph of Symphony No. 34

  - Die Entführung aus dem Serail: Quartet and vaudeville
  - Die Zauberflöte: March of the priests
  - Quartet "Mandina amabile", K. 479
  - Symphony No. 34: III. Andante di molto
- Beethoven - String Quartet, Op. 74: I. Poco adagio – Allegro
- At the beginning of the third movement of Beethoven's String Quartet No. 15, Op. 132, in which the strings play with a hushed quality before later playing with renewed strength.
- The second part of Chopin's Nocturne in C minor, Op 48 No 1, which is marked sotto voce e sostenuto; this is used to 'hold back the drama and keep us in suspense'.
- Chopin - Ballade No. 2

== See also ==
- Sotto voce
