= Franz Jakob Freystädtler =

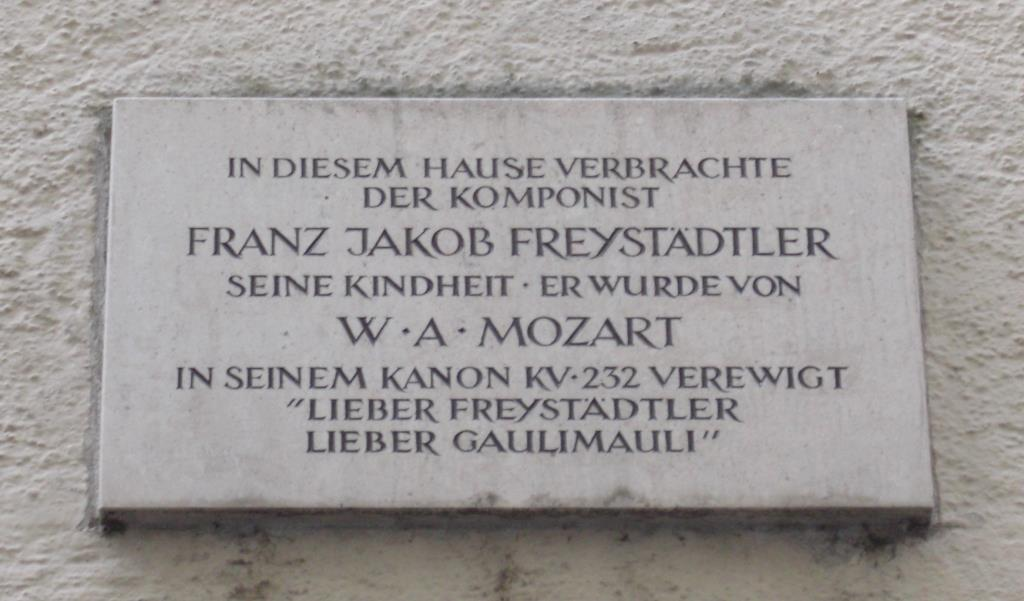
Plaque on Freystädtler's childhood home at Goldgasse 14, Salzburg

Franz Jakob Freystädtler (13 October 1761 – 1 December 1841) was an Austrian organist and composer, and a pupil of Wolfgang Amadeus Mozart.

== Life ==
He was born in Salzburg, where his father Johann was a choirmaster and composer. Franz was a choirboy in the court orchestra of Salzburg, and was trained as an organist by Franz Ignaz Lipp, the organist of Salzburg Cathedral, whom he replaced at age 14. From 1777 to 1784 he was the organist at the chapel of the Abbey of St Peter, Salzburg.

He lived for two years in Munich as a piano teacher, afterwards moving to Vienna in 1786, where he was a pupil of Wolfgang Amadeus Mozart. A composition by Mozart mentions him: the Canon in G for 4 voices, K232, entitled "Lieber Freystädtler, lieber Gaulimauli". It is thought that Freystädtler did some work in completing, with Franz Xaver Süssmayr, the Kyrie of Mozart's Requiem after the death of the composer, other movements eventually being completed by Süssmayr.

Freystädtler continued to live in Vienna as a piano teacher, and also composed; in 1837 he moved into a care home. He died in Vienna in 1841.
