= Simon Andrews (composer) =

British composer

- Born: 1958 (age 66–67); Croydon
- Genres: Classical
- Occupation: Composer

Simon Warren Andrews (born 1958 in Croydon) is a British composer who is Head of Theoretical Studies, Composition, and Director of The Academy Chorale.

== Life ==
Andrews was educated at Chichester Cathedral Choir School. He has a B.A. and B.Mus. in composition, from Christ Church, Oxford, and a Ph.D. from the University of California, Berkeley.

He pursued composition and piano accompaniment at the Royal Academy of Music. Andrews has been involved in education as Assistant Professor of Music and Director of Choral Ensembles at Franklin and Marshall College, and as Conductor of the Lancaster Opera Company and Music Director of the Harrisburg Choral Society. He joined the faculty of the Pennsylvania Academy of Music in 2001. Andrews joined the faculty at Elizabethtown College, near Lancaster, PA, as an adjunct theory professor for the spring semester of 2011.

== Compositions ==
- Mozart Requiem- Andrews revised, edited, and re-orchestrated the final work of Wolfgang Amadeus Mozart. His version is very different from many others as he strived to take the work of Mozart's friend Franz Xaver Süssmayr, who completed Mozart's requiem after his death, and re-orchestrate it to sound more like Mozart had composed it himself, including the complete restructuring of the development section of Süssmayr's Hosanna fugue in the Sanctus and Benedictus movements.

This piece was first performed in 1996 in Lancaster, PA with the Franklin & Marshall Choir and had its professional debut in November 2006 with the Lancaster Symphony Orchestra in collaboration with the Lancaster Symphony Choir, the Franklin & Marshall Choir, and the Millersville University Chorale under the direction of maestro Stephen Gunzenhauser.

- Who Will Go to Bethlehem 2003
