= Piano Concerto No. 18 (Mozart) =

1784 composition by W. A. Mozart

- Paradis
- by W. A. Mozart
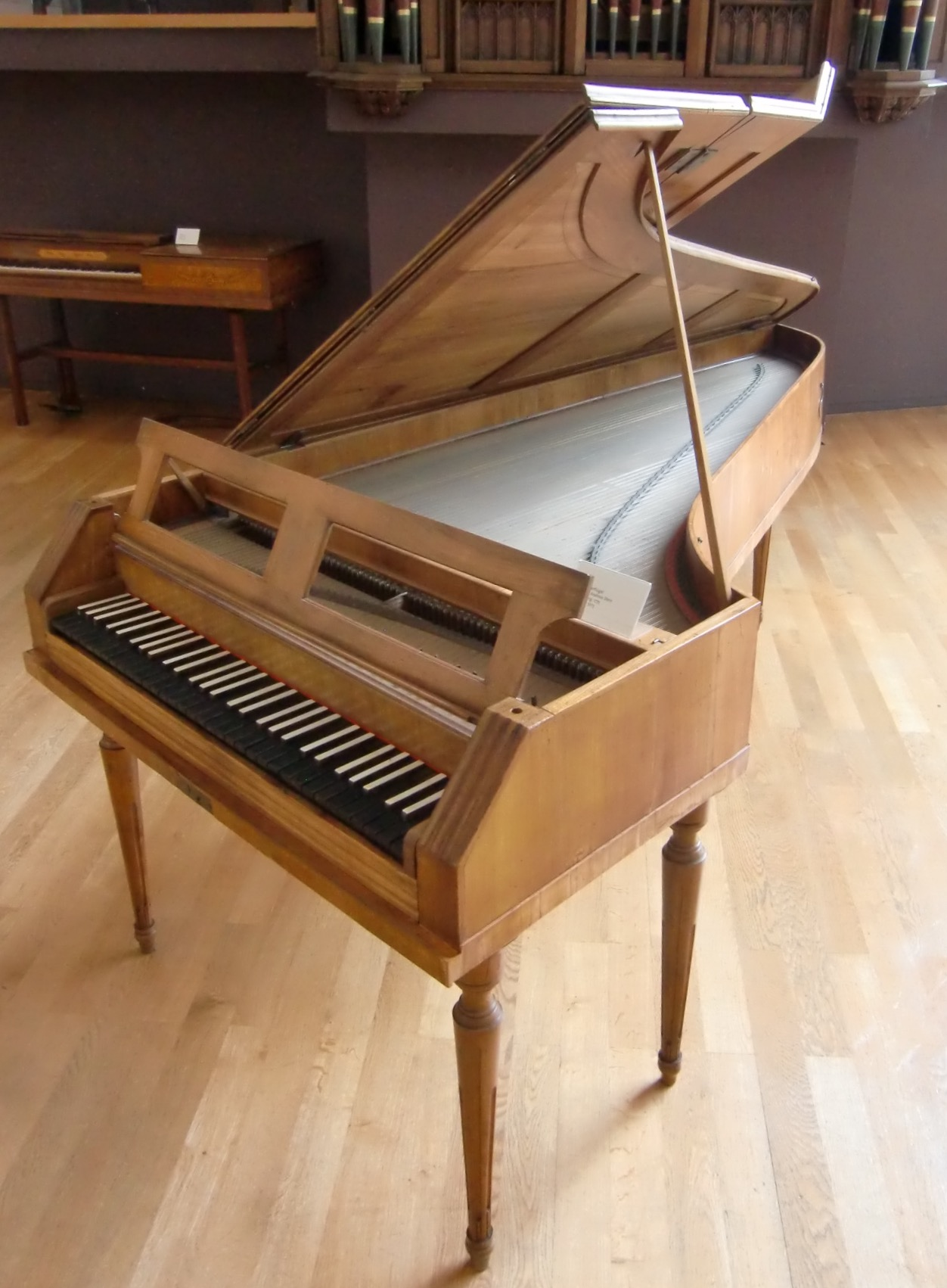
- Pianoforte by Johann Andreas Stein (Augsburg, 1775) – Berlin, Musikinstrumenten-Museum
- Key: B♭ major
- Catalogue: K. 456
- Composed: 1784
- Duration: c. 30 minutes
- Movements: Allegro vivace Andante; Allegro vivace
- Scoring: Piano; orchestra

The Piano Concerto No. 18 in B♭ major, K. 456, subtitled the Paradis, is a piano concerto by Wolfgang Amadeus Mozart. In Mozart's own catalogue of his works, this concerto is dated 30 September 1784.

== History ==
For years, historical speculation was that Mozart had written this concerto for Maria Theresia von Paradis, based on a letter written around that time for his sister by their father. However, Hermann Ullrich has discounted this theory, based on the date of entry in Mozart's catalogue and the fact that von Paradis had left Paris at the start of October 1784, which indicated that there was not sufficient time to send her the concerto for performance. Richard Maunder has countered with the idea that Mozart could still have sent the concerto to Paris and that it would have been forwarded to von Paradis in London, where it was possible that she performed the work in March 1785.

== Music ==
I. Allegro vivace

II. Andante un poco sostenuto

III. Allegro vivace
Performed by Robert Casadesus and the Cleveland Orchestra, conducted by George Szell

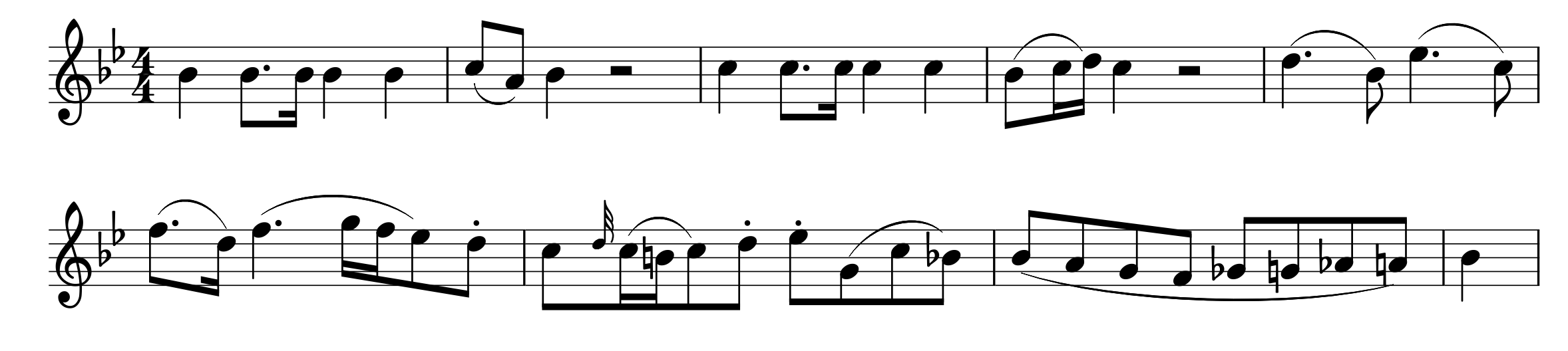
The principal theme of the concerto's first movement, shown here through the opening eight measures of the first violin part

The work is orchestrated for solo piano, flute, two oboes, two bassoons, two horns (in B♭, second movement in G), and strings. Its movements are:

1. Allegro vivace,
2. Andante un poco sostenuto, G minor, 2/4
3. Allegro vivace, 6/8

The slow movement is a theme and variations. Martha Kingdon Ward has commented that the slow movement of this concerto contains one of the "most tranquil" of Mozart's flute solos, specifically in the G-major variation.

M. S. Cole has noted Mozart's use of meter changes in the finale, starting at measure 171, from 6/8 to 2/4 in the winds, with the piano following at measure 179. This changing of tempo in rondo finales was contrary to common practice at the time. Joel Galand has performed a Schenkerian analysis of the rondo finale and noted features such as its novel use of ♭II as a remote key. In practical terms, this means that the last movement leaves the home key of B-flat major for an episode in the apparently-unrelated key of B minor and changes metre while maintaining the same beat – a highly unusual procedure in the musical language of the time.

Mozart wrote out two cadenzas for the first movement. Joseph Swain has performed a Schenkerian analysis of each first-movement cadenza.

== "Paradis" ==
The subtitle Paradis originated with the concerto's association with the blind Viennese musician Maria Theresia von Paradis. It is suggested by historical evidence that Mozart may have composed this concerto for her as a commission. Leopold, according to his letters, attended a concert on 13 February 1785, writing that his son "performed a masterful concerto that he wrote for Paradis. I had the great pleasure of hearing all the interplay of the instruments so clearly that for sheer delight tears came to my eyes." Yet, a number of music historians find it inconclusive which concerto was exactly the one Leopold described.
