= Kyrie in D minor, K. 341 =

Unfinished composition by Mozart

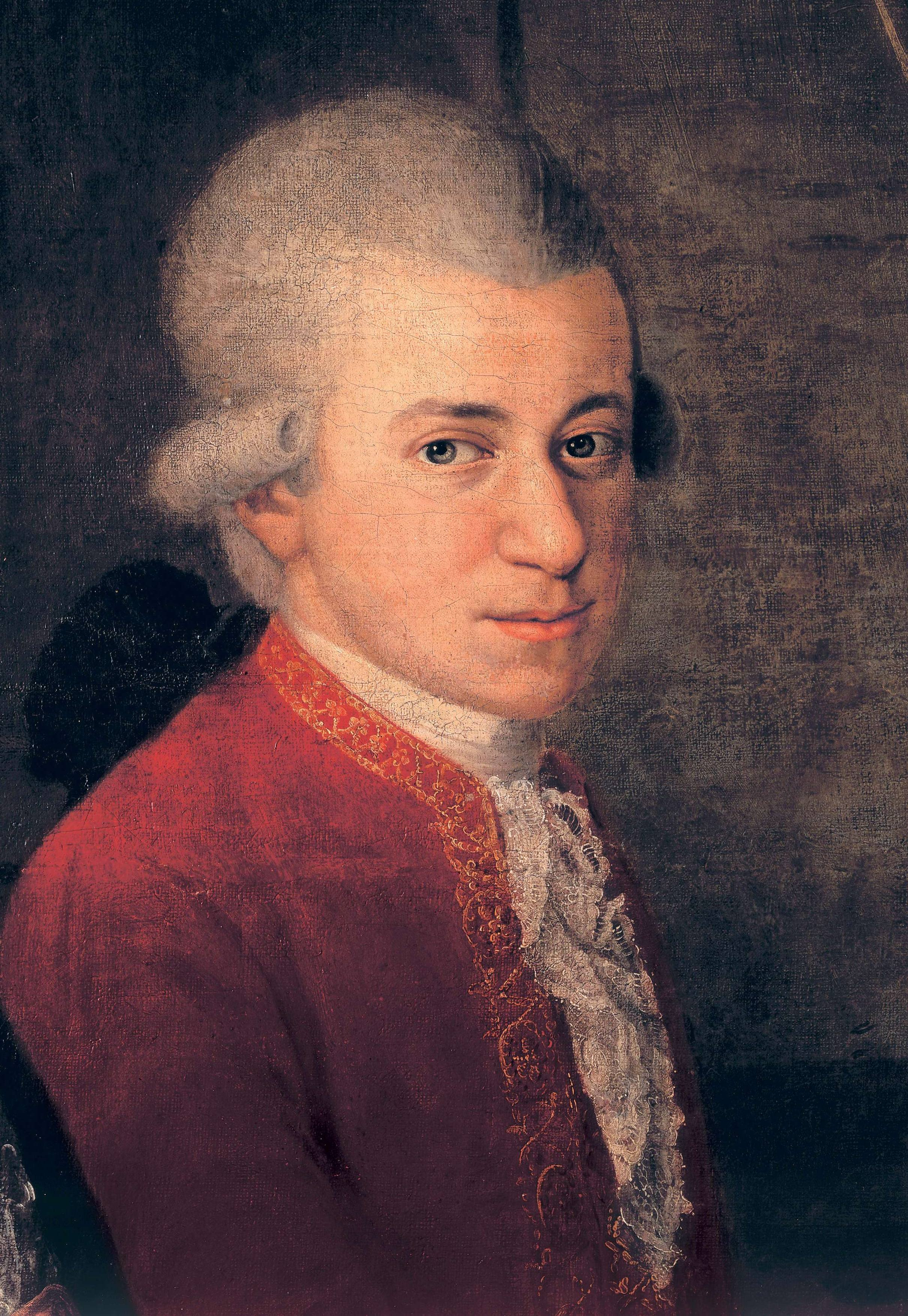
Detail of Wolfgang from the 1780–81 Portrait of the Mozart Family

The Kyrie in D minor, K. 341/368a, is a sacred composition from 1780/1781 or 1791 for choir and large classical orchestra by Wolfgang Amadeus Mozart. It is a setting of the Kyrie, the first section of the Mass, using an orchestra of two flutes, two oboes, two clarinets in A, two bassoons, two trumpets in D, four horns (two in F and two in D), two timpani in D and A, organ, and strings, as well as the chorus. It lasts approximately seven minutes in performance.

== History ==
The autograph was discovered and published after Mozart's death, but was subsequently lost, and only copies and the first edition remain.

Otto Jahn dated the work to between November 1780 and March 1781, during Mozart's stay in Munich for a performance of his opera Idomeneo, since it was assumed that Mozart was mostly uninterested in church music during his Vienna years (producing only the unfinished C minor mass as a result of a vow, the unfinished Requiem for a commission, and the very short Ave verum corpus for a friend), and the clarinets in the scoring would not have been available in Salzburg. Hence the work was sometimes called the Münchener Kyrie (Munich Kyrie). This assumption has since been refuted with the discovery of sketches for sections of the Mass by Mozart dating from the late 1780s, and it was suggested in the Neue Mozart-Ausgabe that K. 341 actually dated from Vienna in 1787–91, when Mozart was hoping to be appointed Kapellmeister of St. Stephen's Cathedral. The absence of K. 341 from Mozart's thematic catalogue of his own compositions (the Verzeichnüss aller meiner Werke, that he kept from 1784 to 1791) may be explained if the work was left unfinished, something which is also suggested by some technical flaws in the published score.
