= Great Mass in C minor, K. 427 =

1783 musical mass by Wolfgang Amadeus Mozart

Great Mass in C minor
- Unfinished missa solemnis by W. A. Mozart
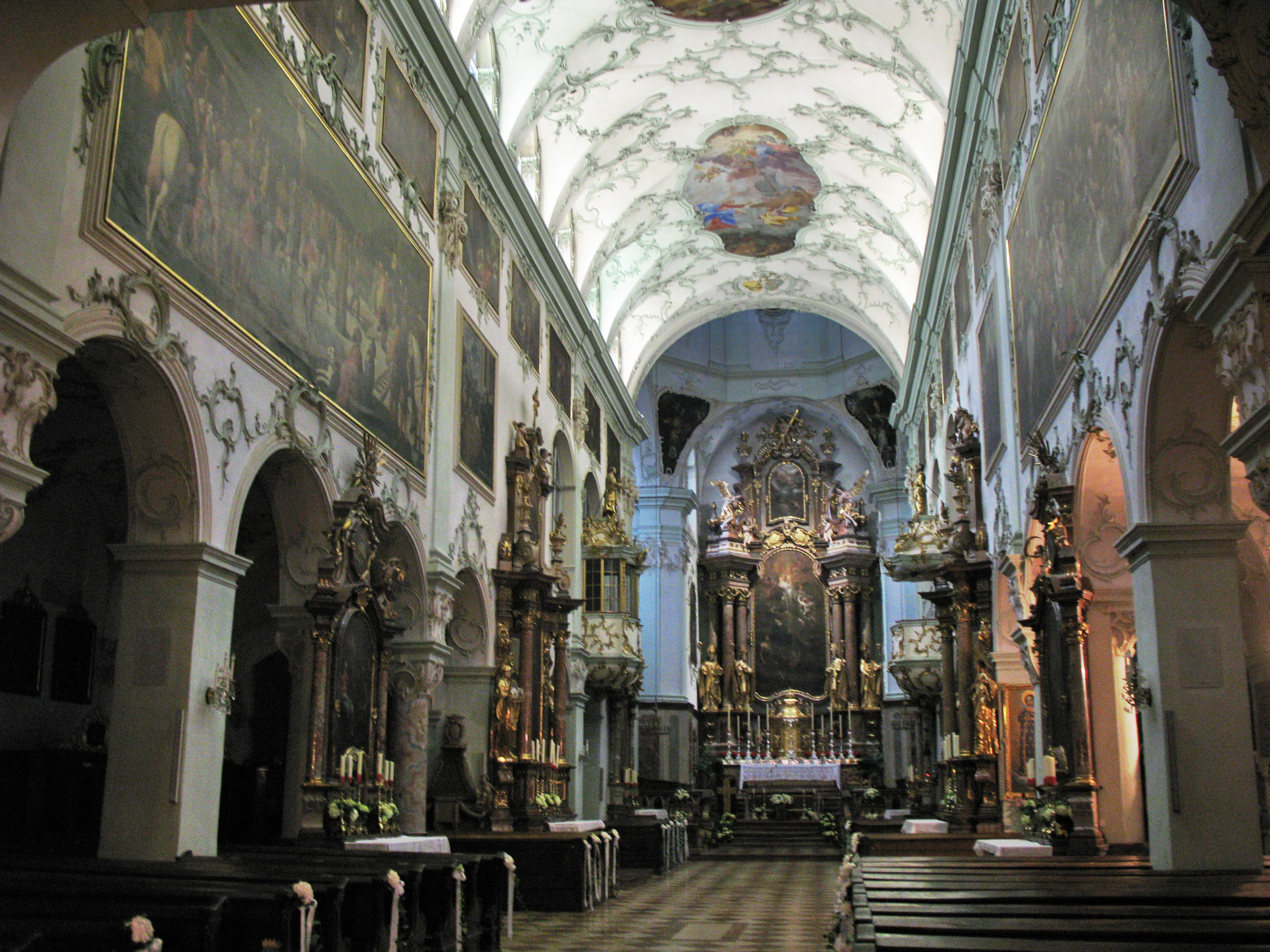
- Interior of Saint Peter's Abbey, Salzburg, where the mass was first performed
- Catalogue: K. 427/417a
- Performed: 26 October 1783: Salzburg
- Vocal: SATB double chorus; soloists: 2 sopranos, tenor, bass
- Instrumental: orchestra

Great Mass in C minor (German: Große Messe in c-Moll), K. 427/417a, is the common name of the musical setting of the mass by Wolfgang Amadeus Mozart, which is considered one of his greatest works. He composed it in Vienna in 1782 and 1783, aged 26–27, after his marriage, when he moved to Vienna from Salzburg. The large-scale work, a missa solemnis, is scored for two soprano soloists, a tenor and a bass, double chorus and large orchestra. It remained unfinished, missing large portions of the Credo and the complete Agnus Dei.

== Composition and first performance ==
The work was composed during 1782–83. In a letter to his father Leopold dated 4 January 1783, Mozart mentioned a vow he had made to write a mass when he would bring his then fiancée Constanze as his wife to Salzburg. However, Ulrich Konrad, after an analysis of that letter – the only source for this theory – fails to support this belief. Konrad concludes that "the supposition that Mozart composed the C minor Mass with Constanze's recovery in mind or with his eye on the longed-for marriage as the fulfilment of a vow of some kind – conveyed even in recent literature – is certainly not stated unambiguously in the text cited here. And there is no other authentic source available."

The first performance took place in Salzburg on Sunday 26 October 1783 (the twentieth Sunday after Pentecost). Mozart had moved to Vienna in 1781, but was paying a visit to his home town in the company of Constanze, who had not yet met his father or his sister (Nannerl). Mozart tailored the large range and challenging coloratura of the soprano solos (namely, "Christe", "Laudamus te" and "Et incarnatus") to Constanze's voice, so she could suitably display her vocal gifts during their visit to Salzburg in 1783. Both "Christe" and "Et incarnatus" have written-out cadenzas, the latter unusually accompanied by a flute, oboe and bassoon.

The performance consisted of just the Kyrie, Gloria, Sanctus and Benedictus, as surviving parts and a score copy from ca. 1800 show. It took place in the church of Saint Peter's Abbey in the context of a Roman Catholic mass. Mozart's sister's diary mentions that the performers were the entire Hofmusik, that is the musicians employed at the court of Salzburg's ruler, Prince-Archbishop Count Hieronymus von Colloredo and thus Mozart's former colleagues. There was a rehearsal in the nearby Kapellhaus on 23 October 1783.

== Fragmentary status ==
Autograph

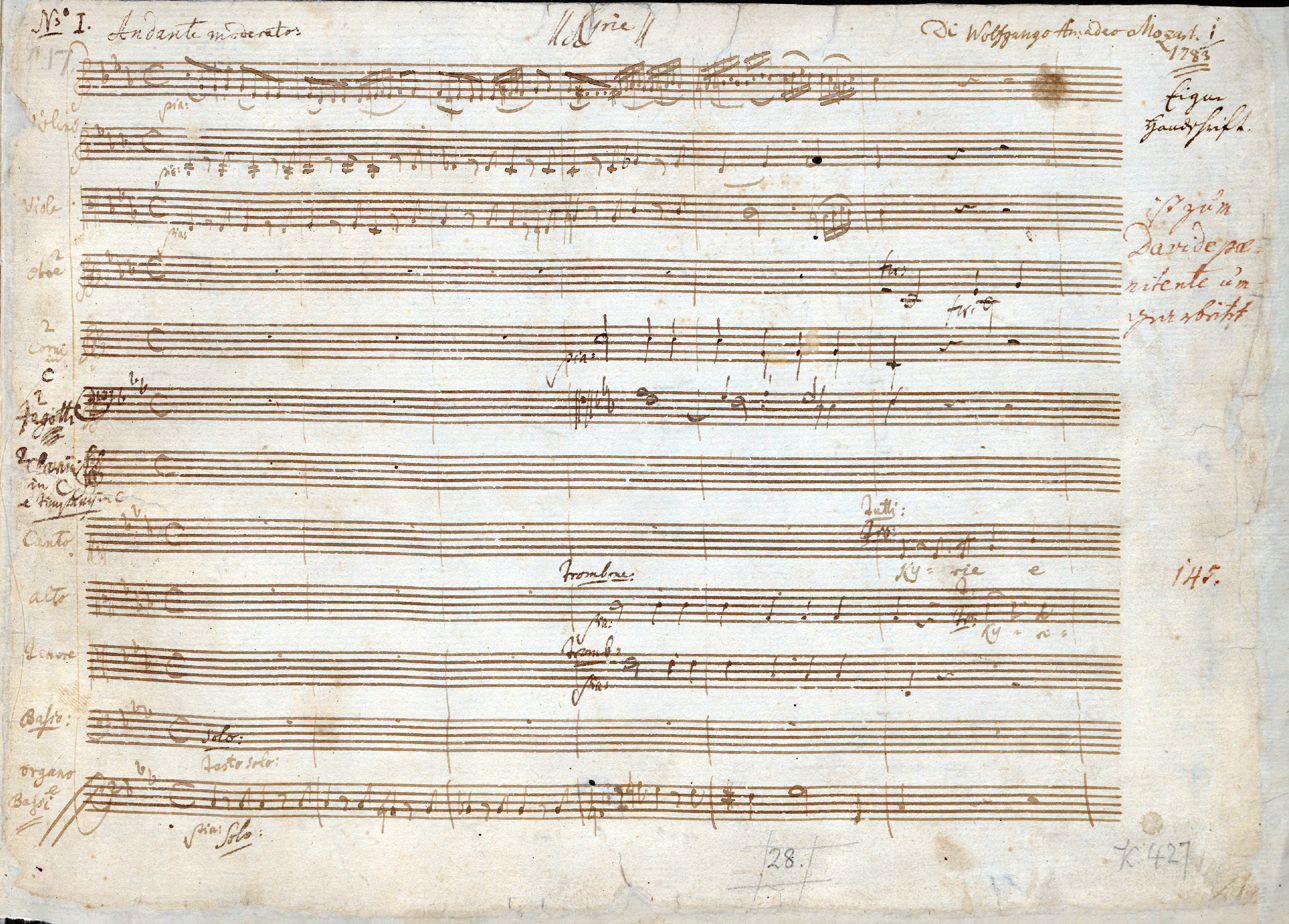
Page 1

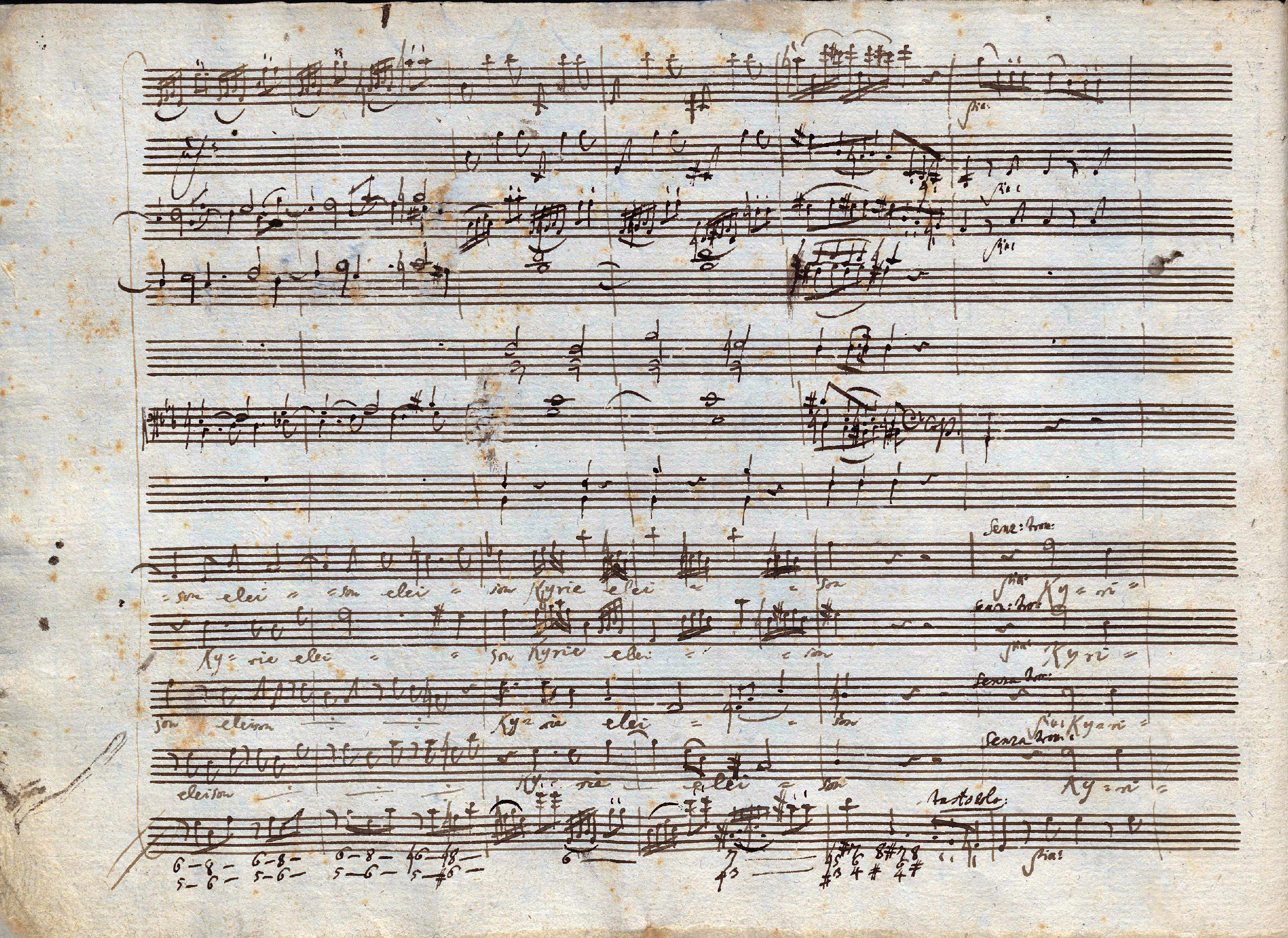
Page 4

The work is incomplete, missing the Credo movements following the aria Et incarnatus est (the orchestration of the only two surviving Credo movements being incomplete) and all of the Agnus Dei. The Sanctus and the Benedictus are partially lost and require editorial reconstructions. There is a good deal of speculation concerning why the work was left unfinished. For purposes of modern performances, the editions and completions available are as follows:

- Georg Alois Schmitt (1901, Breitkopf & Härtel)
- H. C. Robbins Landon (1956, Eulenburg),
- Helmut Eder (1985, Bärenreiter)
- Franz Beyer (1989, Amadeus/Edition Peters)
- Richard Maunder (1990, Oxford University Press/Carus-Verlag),
- Philip Wilby (2004, Novello)
- Robert Levin (2005, Carus-Verlag)
- Frieder Bernius & Uwe Wolf (2016, Carus-Verlag)
- Clemens Kemme (2018, Breitkopf & Härtel)
- Ulrich Leisinger (2019, Bärenreiter).

The editions by Landon, Eder, Beyer, Maunder and Kemme aim to simply fill out the missing orchestrations and choral parts in the Credo and Sanctus, whereas the editions by Schmitt, Wilby and Levin aim to complete the work by either using movements from other masses or composing new music for the Credo and Agnus Dei through the use of parody or elaboration of period sketches by Mozart. Benjamin-Gunnar Cohrs (Musikproduktion Höflich) just offers a complete Credo and an Agnus Dei. For the Credo this means a completions of the 'Credo in unum Deum' and the 'Et incarnatus est' and additional music for the rest of the Credo. This edition, therefore, is intended to be used in combination with any other version of the Mass. Robert Xavier Rodriguez has also completed the Agnus Dei.

Mozart later reused the music from the Kyrie and Gloria, almost without changes except for the text, in the cantata Davide penitente, K. 469. For the cantata Mozart added two new arias and a cadenza for the fugue concluding the work.

== Structure ==
I. Kyrie

II. Gloria
Gloria in excelsis Deo

Laudamus te

Gratias agimus tibi

Domine Deus

Qui tollis

Quoniam tu solus

Jesu Christe

Cum Sanctu Spiritu

III. Credo
Credo in unum Deum

Et incarnatus est

IV. Sanctus
Sanctus - Hosanna

V. Benedictus
Benedictus qui venit
Ferenc Fricsay, Berlin Radio Symphony Orchestra, Choir of St. Hedwig's Cathedral Berlin, Maria Stader, Hertha Töpper, Ernst Haefliger, Ivan Sardi, 1960

1. Kyrie (Andante moderato: Chorus and soprano)
2. Gloria
  Gloria in excelsis Deo (Allegro vivace: Chorus)
  Laudamus te (Allegro aperto: Soprano II)
  Gratias agimus tibi (Adagio: Chorus)
  Domine Deus (Allegro moderato: Sopranos I and II)
  Qui tollis (Largo: Double choir)
  Quoniam tu solus (Allegro: Sopranos I and II, tenor)
  Jesu Christe (Adagio: Chorus)
  Cum Sancto Spiritu (Chorus)
3. Credo
  Credo in unum Deum (Allegro maestoso: Chorus)
  Et incarnatus est (Andante: Soprano I)
4. Sanctus (Largo: Double choir)
  Sanctus Dominus
  Hosanna in excelsis
5. Benedictus
  Benedictus qui venit (Allegro comodo: Quartet and double chorus)

The orchestra consists of 1 flute (only used in the Et incarnatus est), 2 oboes, 2 bassoons, 2 horns, 2 trumpets, 3 trombones, timpani, organ, and strings.

== Influence ==
The work embodies pomp and solemnity associated with the Salzburg traditions of the time, but it also anticipates the symphonic masses of Joseph Haydn in its solo-choral sharing. The mass shows the influence of Bach and Handel, whose music Mozart was studying at this time (see Gottfried van Swieten).

On 20 August 2016 the version reconstructed by Helmut Eder was performed at the Royal Albert Hall, for the first time as part of The Proms series, by the BBC Scottish Symphony Orchestra and BBC Symphony Chorus, with Ilan Volkov conducting and featuring Louise Alder, Carolyn Sampson, Benjamin Hulett and Matthew Rose.

== Discography ==
- Ferenc Fricsay, Berlin Radio Symphony Orchestra, Chor der St.-Hedwigs-Kathedrale Berlin, Maria Stader, Hertha Töpper, Ernst Haefliger, Ivan Sardi. Label: Deutsche Grammophon, 1959
- Sir Colin Davis, London Symphony Orchestra, London Symphony Chorus, Helen Donath, Heather Harper, Ryland Davies, Stafford Dean. Label: Philips Classics, February 1971
- Raymond Leppard, New Philharmonia Orchestra, John Alldis Choir, Ileana Cotrubaș, Kiri Te Kanawa, Werner Krenn, Hans Sotin. Label: EMI, 1974
- Sir Neville Marriner, Academy and Chorus of St. Martin in the Fields, Margaret Marshall, Felicity Palmer, Anthony Rolfe Johnson, Gwynne Howell. Label: Philips, 1979
- Herbert von Karajan, Berliner Philharmoniker, Wiener Singverein, Barbara Hendricks, Janet Perry, Peter Schreier, Benjamin Luxon. Label: Deutsche Grammophon, 1981
- John Eliot Gardiner, English Baroque Soloists, Monteverdi Choir, Sylvia McNair, Diana Montague, Anthony Rolfe Johnson, Cornelius Hauptmann. Label: Archiv, November 1986
- Robert Shaw, Atlanta Symphony Orchestra & Chorus, Edith Wiens, Delores Ziegler, John Aler, William Stone. Label: Telarc, 1988
- Peter Neumann, Collegium Cartusianum Orchestra, Cologne Chamber Choir, Barbara Schlick, Monika Frimmer, Christoph Prégardien, Klaus Mertens. Label: EMI Electrola, November 19–22, 1989
- Peter Schreier, Staatskapelle Dresden, Rundfunkchor Leipzig, Barbara Hendricks, Pamela Coburn, Hans Peter Blochwitz, Andreas Schmidt. Label: Philips Classics, January 1988 and 1989.
- Claudio Abbado, Berlin Philharmonic, Berlin Radio Choir, Barbara Bonney, Arleen Auger, Hans Peter Blochwitz, Robert Holl. Label: Sony, 1991
- Claudio Abbado, Vienna Philharmonic, Jerry Hadley, Karita Mattila, Jorge Pita. Label: Deutsche Grammophon, 2016
- Leonard Bernstein, Bavarian Radio Symphony Orchestra and Choir, Arleen Auger, Frederica von Stade, Frank Lopardo, Cornelius Hauptmann. Label: Deutsche Grammophon 431 791–2, 1991
- Version of Richard Maunder: Christopher Hogwood, Academy of Ancient Music, Westminster College Quiristers, Winchester Cathedral Choir, Arleen Auger, Lynne Dawson, John-Mark Ainsley, David Thomas. Label: L'Oiseau-Lyre, 1990
- Sir Neville Marriner, Academy and Chorus of St. Martin in the Fields, Kiri Te Kanawa, Anne Sofie von Otter, Anthony Rolfe Johnson, Robert Lloyd. Label: Philips Classics, March 1993.
- James Levine, Wiener Philharmoniker, chorus, Kathleen Battle, Martin Haselböck, others. Label: Deutsche Grammophon, 1998
- Masaaki Suzuki, Bach Collegium Japan instrumental and vocal ensembles, Christian Immler, Makoto Sakurada, Carolyn Sampson, Olivia Vermeulen. Label: BIS Records, 2016

== Videography ==
- Great Mass in C minor, K. 427, Leonard Bernstein, Bavarian Radio Symphony Orchestra and Chorus, Arleen Auger, Frederica von Stade, Frank Lopardo, Cornelius Hauptmann. Label: Deutsche Grammophon, 2006
