= Musikproduktion Höflich =

Musikproduktion Höflich is a music publisher established by Jürgen Höflich in Munich, Germany. The firm started in 2002 by publishing reprints of miniature scores which were long out of print within the series Repertoire Explorer and Opera Explorer. The goal of the publisher is stated by them:

Its core idea emerged from the belief that many outstanding musical works remain unknown, forgotten, undervalued, or rarely performed. In addition, much of this neglected music had long been unavailable commercially.

Later the catalogue was expanded into various series such as The Phillip Brookes Collection, The Flemish Music Collection, and a special edition for piano solo. The catalogue includes rare scores of works from the opera and orchestra repertoire as well as chamber and vocal music.
