= Robert Levin (musicologist) =

American classical pianist, musicologist and composer

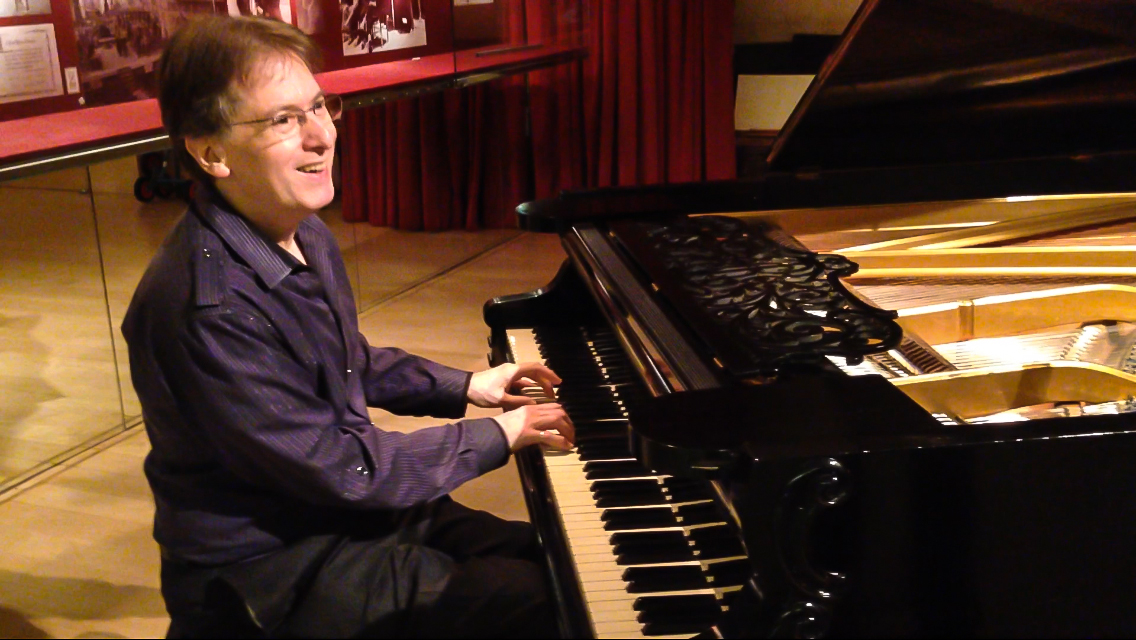
Levin playing the Rönisch piano in the Museu de la Música de Barcelona

Robert David Levin (born October 13, 1947) is an American classical pianist, musicologist, and composer. He was a professor of music at Harvard University from 1993 to 2014 and the artistic director of the Sarasota Music Festival from 2007 to 2017.

== Education ==
Born in Brooklyn, Levin attended the Brooklyn Friends School and Andrew Jackson High School, and spent his junior year studying music with Nadia Boulanger in Paris. He attended Harvard, where he earned his Bachelor of Arts magna cum laude in 1968 with a thesis titled The Unfinished Works of W. A. Mozart.

Levin took private lessons at Chatham Square Music School, Conservatoire National de Musique and the Fontainebleau School of Music in:

- piano, with Jan Gorbaty, Louis Martin, Alice Gaultier-Léon, Jean Casadesus, Clifford Curzon and Robert Casadesus
- organ, with Nadia Boulanger
- solfège, with Seymour Bernstein, Louis Martin and Annette Dieudonné
- counterpoint, with Suzanne Bloch and Nadia Boulanger
- composition, with Stefan Wolpe
- conducting, with Eleazar de Carvalho

== Academic career ==
After graduating from Harvard, Levin was named head of the theory department at the Curtis Institute of Music. He was subsequently appointed associate professor of music and coordinator of theory instruction at SUNY Purchase, and full professor in 1975. From 1986 to 1993, he served as professor of piano at the Hochschule für Musik Freiburg in Germany. In 1993 he became professor of music at his alma mater, Harvard University, where he remains Professor Emeritus. In 1994 he was made Dwight P. Robinson Jr Professor of the Humanities at Harvard, and was a head tutor from 1998 to 2004. In 2012, as Humanitas Visiting Professor of chamber music at Centre for Research in the Arts, Social Sciences and Humanities (CRASSH), University of Cambridge, he gave two lectures, Improvising Mozart and Composing Mozart and a concert with Academy of Ancient Music.

Levin's academic career has included teaching and tutoring performance practice (especially involving keyboard instruments and conducting, with an emphasis on the Classical period) in addition to music history and theory. He currently holds the position of Hogwood Fellow with the Academy of Ancient Music.

== Contributions to composition ==
Levin has completed or reconstructed a number of 18th-century works, especially unfinished compositions by Mozart and Johann Sebastian Bach.

His completions of several unfinished Mozart works, including the Requiem in D minor and Great Mass in C minor, are considered his most important achievements. In the Mozart Requiem, he reconstructed an "Amen" fugue from Mozart's own sketches. John Eliot Gardiner commissioned him to write missing orchestral parts to five movements of cantatas by Bach, such as Ach! ich sehe, itzt, da ich zur Hochzeit gehe. As a performer, he is best known as a soloist in Classical-era piano concertos in general, and those of Mozart and Beethoven in particular, in which he robustly re-creates performance practice of the composers' time such as by improvising cadenzas and shorter embellishments in the composers' style.

Levin has composed several works, including the following:

- Two clarinet sonatas (1961; 1967–68)
- Two Short Piano Pieces (1966–67)
- Bassoon Sonata (1965–66)
- Woodwind Quintet (1965)
- Piano Quartet (1964–65)
- Piano Sonata (1962)

== Awards ==
- Prix Lili Boulanger in 1966 and 1971
- Bach Medal (2018)
- Golden Mozart Medal of the Mozarteum Salzburg (2024)

== Personal life ==
Levin is married to Ya-Fei Chuang, a pianist who studied with him at the Hochschule für Musik Freiburg.

== Completions and reconstructions of fragments by Mozart ==
- Requiem in D minor K. 626 (also historically completed by Franz Xaver Süssmayr)
- Mass in C minor ("The Great") K. 427 (also historically completed by Alois Schmitt and reconstructed into a performable version by a number of composers, including H. C. Robbins Landon, Franz Beyer and Richard Maunder)
- Larghetto and Allegro in E♭ major for two pianos K. deest (also historically completed by Maximilian Stadler and Paul Badura-Skoda)
- Rondo in A major for basset clarinet and string quartet, K. 581a
- Allegro in B♭ major for basset clarinet and string quartet, K. 516c
- Allegro in B♭ major for keyboard, K. 400 (also historically completed by Maximilian Stadler)
- Allegro in G minor for keyboard, K. 312/590d (also historically completed by an unknown composer)
- Sonata Movement in C major, K. 42 (35a)
- Suite in C major for keyboard, K. 399: Sarabande
- Concerto for Violin and Piano K. Anh. 56/315f
- Horn Concerto in D major, K. 412 (also historically completed by Franz Xaver Süssmayr)
- Rondo for horn and orchestra in E♭ major K. 371
- Sinfonia Concertante for oboe, clarinet, horn and bassoon K. 297b (reconstruction of possible original version for flute, oboe, horn, and bassoon)

== Recordings ==
- Ludwig van Beethoven. Cello Sonatas. Robert Levin with Steven Isserlis. Hyperion Records Limited
- Ludwig van Beethoven. Piano Concertos. Robert Levin with Orchestre Revolutionnaire et Romantique, John Eliot Gardiner. Archiv Produktion
- Wolfgang Amadeus Mozart. Piano Concertos K271 & K414. Robert Levin with The Academy of Ancient Music, Christopher Hogwood. Played on a Walter fortepiano replica by Paul McNulty. Éditions de l'Oiseau-Lyre
- Wolfgang Amadeus Mozart. Piano Concertos K453 & K466. Robert Levin with The Academy of Ancient Music, Christopher Hogwood. Éditions de l'Oiseau-Lyre
- Wolfgang Amadeus Mozart. Piano Concertos K456 & K459. Robert Levin with The Academy of Ancient Music, Christopher Hogwood. Éditions de l'Oiseau-Lyre
- Wolfgang Amadeus Mozart. The Piano Sonatas. Robert Levin. Played on Mozart's own piano by Anton Walter. ECM New Series.
- Franz Joseph Haydn. The Last 4 Piano Trios: H 15 no 27-30. Robert Levin with Vera Beths and Anner Bylsma. SC Vivarte Series 53120
- Henri Dutilleux. D'ombre et de silence (Piano Sonata, Preludes, etc.). ECM New Series 2105
- Johann Sebastian Bach. Keyboard Works. Robert Levin, Trevor Pinnock, Robert Hill, Peter Watchorn, Edward Aldwell, Evgeni Koroliov. Played on an antique harpsichord and organ. Label: Hanssler Classic.
- Franz Schubert. Piano Sonatas. Robert Levin. Played on Johann Fritz 1825 fortepiano. Sony Classical.
- Franz Schubert. Complete Piano Trios. Noah Bendix-Balgley (violin), Peter Wiley (cello). Le Palais des Dégustateurs
- J.S. Bach. Six Partitas BWV 825 - 830. Le Palais des Dégustateurs.
- Wolfgang Amadeus Mozart. Trio in G major K 496. Three unfinished movements for trio K 442 completed by Robert Levin. Robert Levin (piano) - Hilary Hahn (violin) - Alain Meunier (cello). Le Palais des Dégustateurs
