= Richard Maunder =

British mathematician and musicologist (1937–2018)

- Born: Charles Richard Francis Maunder; 23 November 1937; Southsea, Hampshire
- Died: 5 June 2018 (aged 80); Cambridge

Academic background
- Education: Royal Grammar School, High Wycombe
- Alma mater: Jesus College, Cambridge; Christ's College, Cambridge
- Thesis: Cohomology Operations of the Nth Kind (1962)
- Doctoral advisor: Frank Adams

Academic work
- Discipline: Mathematics, musicology
- Doctoral students: Nigel Martin

Charles Richard Francis Maunder (23 November 1937 – 5 June 2018) was a British mathematician and musicologist.

== Early life ==
Maunder was educated at the Royal Grammar School, High Wycombe, and Jesus College, Cambridge, before going on to complete a PhD at Christ's College, Cambridge, in 1962. After teaching at Southampton University he became a fellow of Christ's in 1964.

== Mathematics ==
Maunder's field of work was algebraic topology. He used Postnikov systems to give an alternative construction of the Atiyah–Hirzebruch spectral sequence. With this construction, the differentials can be better described. The family of higher cohomology operations on mod-2 cohomology that he constructed has been discussed by several authors. In 1981 he gave a short proof of the Kan-Thurston theorem, according to which for every path-connected topological space X there is a discrete group π such that there is a homology isomorphism of the Eilenberg–MacLane space K(π,1) after X. His textbook Algebraic Topology (1970) continues to circulate in the 1996 Dover edition.

== Musicology ==
Maunder created a new version of Mozart's Requiem. Following on from other musicologists such as Ernst Hess, Franz Beyer and Robert D. Levin, he presented a fundamental revision of Mozart's last work, in which, like his predecessors, he wanted to remove Süssmayr's additions as far as possible and replace them with Mozart's own ideas. This new version was recorded by Christopher Hogwood with the Academy of Ancient Music in 1983 and the score was published in 1988. In 1992 it was recorded by Rupert Gottfried Frieberger.

In doing so, Maunder rejected Süssmayr's Sanctus and Benedictus completely and removed them from the work; he considered only the Agnus Dei to be authentic because of its comparisons with other church music works by Mozart. Maunder also composed an Amen fugue for the conclusion of the Lacrimosa, for which he took Mozart's sketch sheet and a fugue for organ roll by Mozart (K. 608) as a starting point. He also fundamentally revised Süssmayr's instrumentation throughout the Requiem.

This version was performed several times in German-speaking countries, including a dance version Requiem! by Birgit Scherzer.

Maunder's edition of Mozart's C minor Mass was published in 1990 and was first recorded by Hogwood in the same year. Maunder edited also pieces by Francesco Geminiani, Tomaso Albinoni, Henry Purcell, members of the Bach Family, Giuseppe Sammartini and others. https://imslp.org/wiki/Category:Maunder,_Richard

== Works ==
=== Mathematics ===
- Maunder, C. R. F. (1963). "Cohomology operations of the Nth kind". Proceedings of the London Mathematical Society (Third Series). 13 (1): 125–154. doi:10.1112/plms/s3-13.1.125. ISSN 0024-6115.
- Maunder, C. R. F. (1963). "The spectral sequence of an extraordinary cohomology theory". Mathematical Proceedings of the Cambridge Philosophical Society. 59 (3): 567–574. Bibcode:1963PCPS...59..567M. doi:10.1017/S0305004100037245. ISSN 0305-0041. S2CID 122794658.
- Maunder, C. R. F. (1970). Algebraic Topology. London: Van Nostrand Reinhold. ISBN 0-442-05168-9. Reissued in 1980 (Cambridge University Press, ISBN 0-521-29840-7) and 1996 (Dover Publications, Mineola, New York, ISBN 0-486-69131-4)
- Maunder, C. R. F. (1981). "A short proof of a theorem of Kan and Thurston". Bulletin of the London Mathematical Society. 13 (4): 325–327. doi:10.1112/blms/13.4.325. ISSN 0024-6093.

=== Musicology ===
- (as editor) Mozart, Wolfgang Amadeus (1988). Requiem, K. 626 (Full score). Oxford University Press. ISBN 0-19-337618-0.
- Maunder, Richard (1988). Mozart's Requiem: On preparing a new edition. Oxford: Clarendon Press. ISBN 0-19-316413-2.
- (as editor) Mozart, Wolfgang Amadeus (1990). Mass in C Minor K427. Oxford University Press. ISBN 0-19-337615-6.
- Maunder, Richard (1998). Keyboard instruments in eighteenth-century Vienna. Clarendon Press. ISBN 0-19-816637-0.
