= Franz Xaver Süssmayr =

Austrian composer and conductor (1766-1803)

Franz Xaver Süssmayr or Süßmayr (Austrian German: [frants ˈksaːvɐ ˈsyːsmaɪɐ]; 1766 – September 17, 1803), also anglicized as Suessmayr, was an Austrian composer and conductor. Popular in his day, he is now known primarily as the composer who completed Wolfgang Amadeus Mozart's unfinished Requiem.

== Life ==
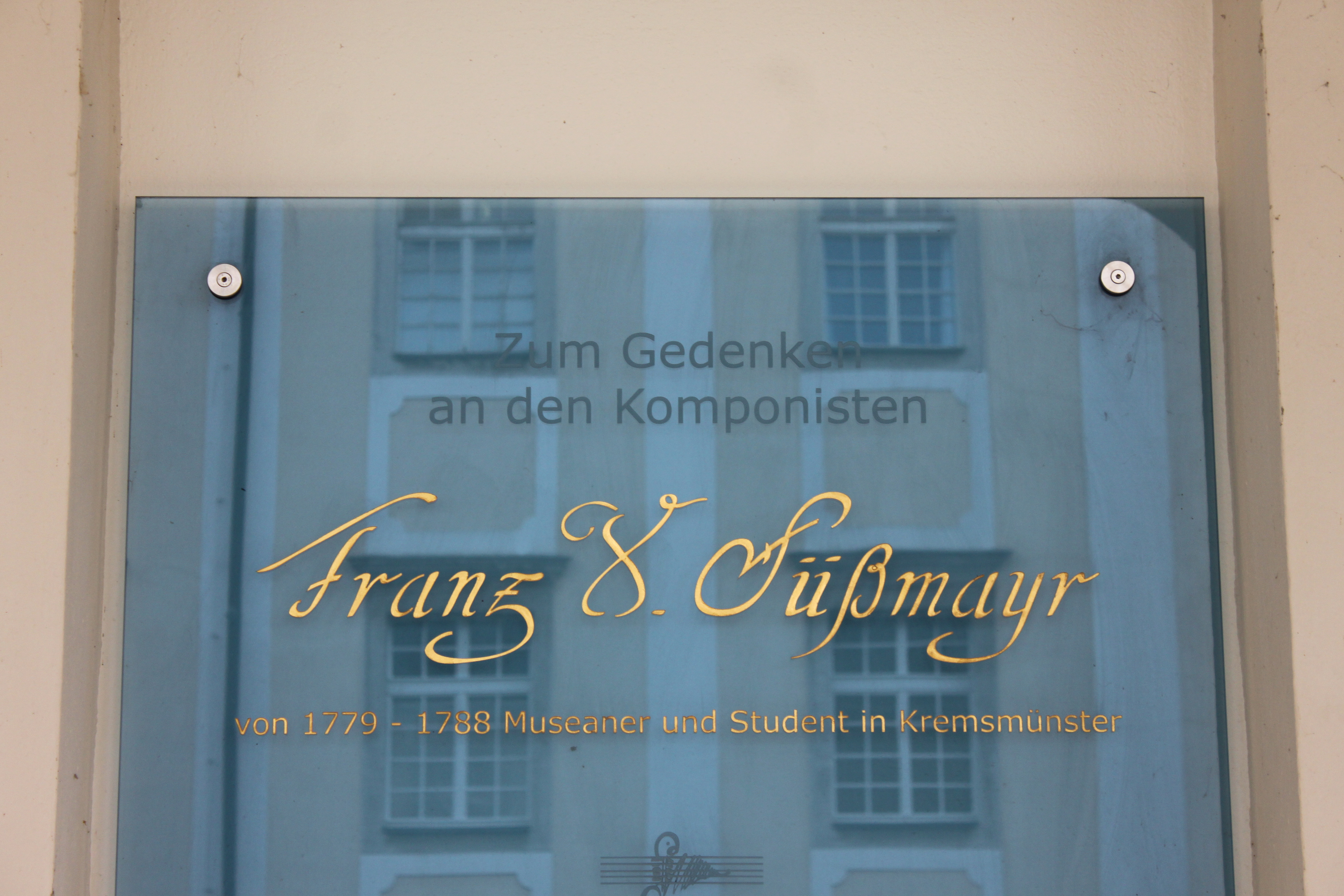
Memorial plaque in Kremsmünster Abbey

Süssmayr was born in Schwanenstadt in upper Austria. He received early music lessons from his father Franz Karl Süssmayr, and later was educated at Kremsmünster Abbey, where Georg Pasterwitz was a teacher. At the monastery he composed symphonies, cantatas and church music, which were performed at the abbey theatre.

He moved to Vienna in 1788, where he became a student and friend of Mozart. On Mozart's last journey to Prague in 1791, where his opera La clemenza di Tito was first performed, Süssmayr accompanied him; Süssmayr, at Mozart's request, composed the secco recitatives for the opera. After Mozart's death later in that year, the composer's widow Constanze was anxious that the partially composed Requiem should be completed; the completion was attempted by Franz Jakob Freystädtler and Joseph Eybler, eventually being carried out by Süssmayr.

In 1792 he became the substitute conductor at the Burgtheater, and from 1794 to 1803 he was conductor at the Theater am Kärntnertor. He composed operas that were staged at these theatres and at Emanuel Schikaneder's theatres: the Theater auf der Wieden and later the Theater an der Wien.

His health suffered because of an unregulated lifestyle, and he died in Vienna in 1803, aged 37.

=== Critics' assessments ===
Max Dies wrote in Allgemeine Deutsche Biographie (1894): "Süßmayer's writing style is smooth, pleasing, singable, but generally fashionably superficial. Nowhere does a trace of idiosyncrasy shine out."

His biographer in Biographisches Lexikon des Kaiserthums Oesterreich (1880) wrote: "While his friends called him a "second Mozart", more unbiased music critics find in his creations neither originality nor poetic depth; but they do not deny that they have melody and a charming, even folksy character, by means of which they met with a reasonably enthusiastic reception on the part of the public."

== Works ==
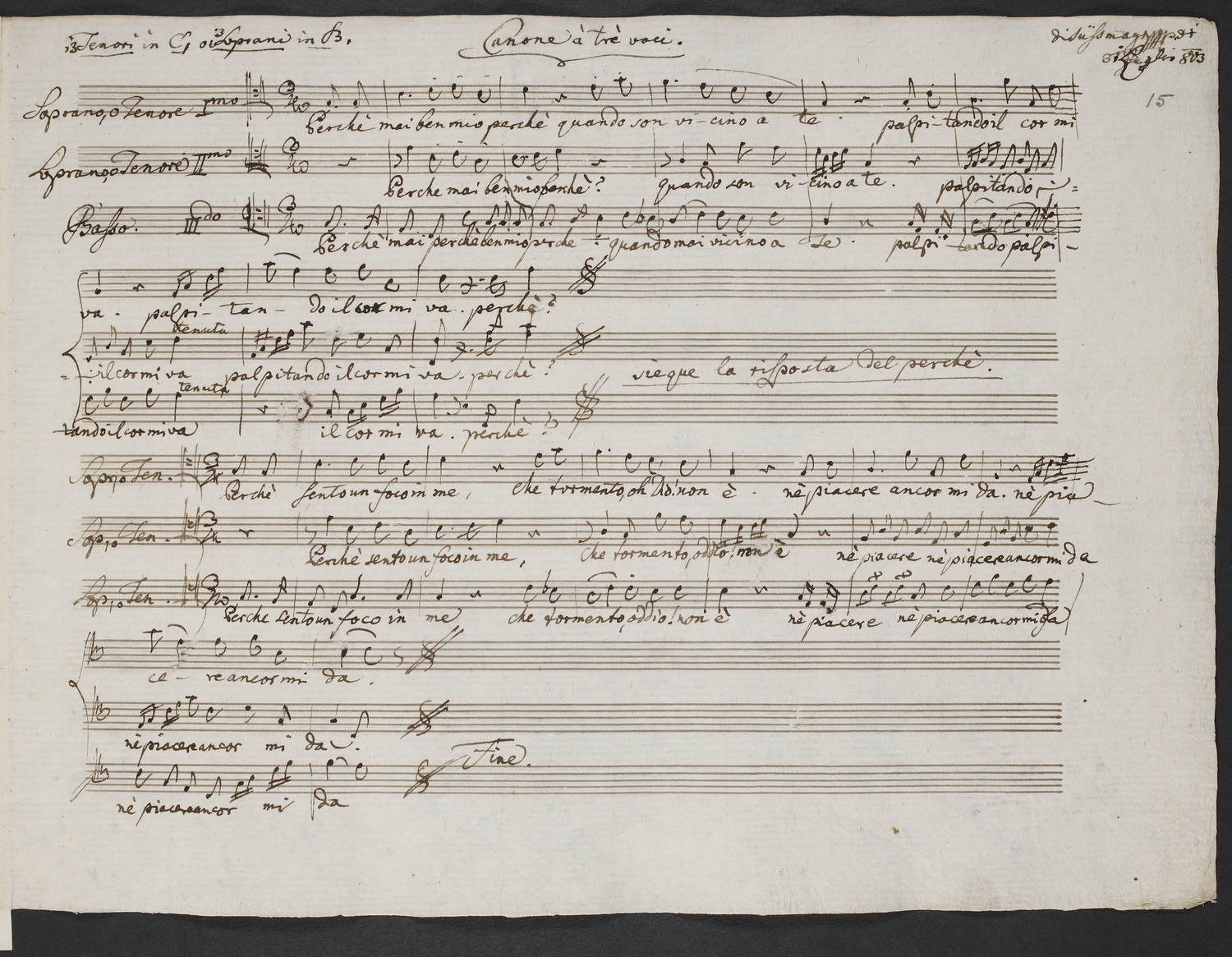
Manuscript of Perché mai ben mio (SmWV 327). (BL Add MS 32181 f. 15r)

His works include the following:

- String Trio in D Minor (SmWV 613)
- Two masses (SmWV 101–102)
- Two requiems (SmWV 103–104)
- Completion of Mozart's Requiem (SmWV 105)
- Seven offertories (SmWV 112–115, 117–119, 123, 125, 144–145, 156)
- A gradual (SmWV 143)
- Psalms
- A magnificat
- Hymns
- Agonia e morte di Mozart (fantasia for piano)
- Nicht mehr als sechs Schüsseln (SmWV 205)
- Moses oder der Auszug aus Ägypten (SmWV 209)
- Der Spiegel von Arkadien (SmWV 213)
- List und Zufall (SmWV 224)
- Soliman oder die drei Sultaninnen (SmWV 219). Beethoven used a theme from this opera for his Variations on 'Tändeln und Scherzen', WoO 76.
- Il noce di Benevento, ballet by Salvatore Viganò, premiered at La Scala on 25 April 1812. It gave an inspiration to Niccolò Paganini for creating Le Streghe, Variations on a theme from the ballet Il noce di Benevento (Op. 8, 1813).

== Recent performances and recordings ==
There have been performances of Süssmayr's operas at Kremsmünster, and his secular political cantata (1796), Der Retter in Gefahr, SmWV 302, received its first full performance in over 200 years in June 2012 in a new edition by Mark Nabholz, conducted by Terrence Stoneberg. There are also CD recordings of his unfinished clarinet concerto (completed by Michael Freyhan), one of his German requiems, and his Missa Solemnis in D.

Of special note may be the clarinet concerto (SmWV 501) he most probably wrote for Mozart's clarinetist Anton Stadler, because it was scored for the basset clarinet. Recordings of the work by Dieter Klöcker (on Novalis) on "normal clarinet" and by Thea King (on Hyperion) in a reconstructed version for basset clarinet by Michael Freyhan are available. In 2021 a completion appropriate for period basset clarinet was published by Craig Hill.

== Sources ==
Books

- Hausner, H.H. (1964). Franz Xaver Süßmayr. Vienna.
- Wlcek, W. (1978) [1953]. Franz Xaver Süßmayr als Kirchenkomponist (Dissertation ed.). Vienna.
- Wolff, C. (1991). Mozarts Requiem.
- Duda, E. (2000). Das musikalische Werk F. X. Süßmayrs.

Articles

- Freyhan, Michael: "Towards the Original Text of Mozart's Die Zauberflote" in Journal of the American Musicological Society, Summer 1986, no. 2, pp. 355–380
- Freyhan, Michael: "Rediscovery of the 18th Century Scores and Parts of 'Die Zauberflote' showing the Text Used at the Hamburg Premiere in 1793" in Mozart Jahrbuch 1997, pp. 109–149
- Lorenz, Michael: "Süßmayr und die Lichterputzer. Von gefundenen und erfundenen Quellen", in Mozart Jahrbuch 2006

Editions

- Franz Xaver Süßmayr, Der Spiegel von Arkadien (Vienna, 1794), edited by David J. Buch, Recent Researches in the Music of the Classical Era, vols. 93–94 (Middleton, Wisconsin: A-R Editions, 2014)
