= List of compositions by William Lloyd Webber =

This is a complete list of compositions by William Lloyd Webber (1914–1982).

== Organ solo ==
- Prelude and Fugue (composed in 1936. Unpublished.)
- Three Voluntaries (composed in 1950. London: Bosworth & Co. Ltd., 1950):
1. Introit (in E♭ major)
2. Offertory (in G minor)
3. Recessional (in E♭ major)
- Suite in B♭ major (composed in 1951. London: Bosworth & Co. Ltd, 1951):
1. Prelude
2. Fugal Allegro
3. Minuet (in G minor)
4. Choral Song
- Beside the Still Waters: Six Introductory Improvisations (composed in 1952. London: Bosworth & Co. Ltd., 1952)
1. Andante, poco gravamente (in E minor)
2. Andantino Amabile (in E major)
3. Adagio e mesto (in A minor)
4. Moderato, poco mosso e grazioso (in F major)
5. Andantino alla Cantilena (in F minor)
6. Lento con tenerezza (in D major)
- Three Recital Pieces (composed in 1952. London: Francis, Day & Hunter, 1952):
1. Prelude (in E♭ major)
2. Barcarolle (in G minor)
3. Nuptial March (in D major)
- The Chapel in the Valley, Vol. 1: Six Voluntaries (composed in 1953. London: A. Weekes & Co., 1953):
1. Aria
2. Larghetto
3. Vesper Hymn
4. Trumpet Minuet (in G major)
5. Cradle Song
6. Choral March ((in B♭ major)
- The Chapel in the Valley, Vol. 2: Six Voluntaries (composed in 1953. London: A. Weekes & Co., 1953):
1. Prelude (in E♭ major)
2. Song Without Words
3. Postlude (in D minor)
4. Communion
5. Festal March (in E♭ major)
6. Epilogue (in A major)
- Dedication March (in F major) (composed in 1953. London: William Elkin, 1953)
- Four Epilogues (composed in 1953. London: Bosworth & Co. Ltd., 1953):
1. Allegro moderato (in C major)
2. Risoluto (in E minor)
3. Resurgam (in E♭ major)
4. Maestoso, ma con anima (in A major)
- Christ in the tomb from „The Divine Compassion“ (composed in 1954. In: Centenary Collection Organ, 2014)
- Intermezzo on „Holyrood“ (composed in 1956. London: Novello, 1956)
- Four Quiet Interludes (composed in 1956. London: Bosworth & Co. Ltd., 1956):
1. Elegiac
2. Dorian
3. Pastorale (By the waters of Babylon)
4. Choral (in E♭ major)
- Rhapsody on "Helmsley" (composed in 1956. London: Novello, 1956)
- Six Sketches (composed in 1956. London: Francis, Day & Hunter, 1956):
1. Prelude
2. Slumber Song
3. Summer Pastures
4. Romance
5. Intermezzo
6. Postlude (in G major)
- Arietta in A major (composed in 1957. London: William Elkin, 1957)
- Chorale, Cantilena and Finale (composed in 1958. London: Novello, 1958)
- Benedictus (Diapasons) (composed in 1960. In: The Colours of the organ: six pieces by modern composers. London: Novello, 1960)
- Six Interludes on Christmas Carols (composed in 1960. London: Novello, 1961):
1. The Holly and the Ivy
2. Good King Wenceslas
3. Whence is this Goodly Fragrance
4. Noel Nouvelet
5. The Coventry Carol
6. God rest you Merry, Gentlemen
- Solemn procession (composed in 1961. In: Fanfares and processionals: eight pieces for organ by modern composers. London: Novello, 1961)
- Six Interludes on Passion Hymns (composed in 1963. London: Novello, 1963):
1. There is a green hill far away (Horsley)
2. When I Survey the Wondrous Cross (Rockingham)
3. Ride On, Ride On in Majesty (Winchester New)
4. O Come and Mourn with Me Awhile (St Cross)
5. O sacred head sore wounded (Passion Chorale)
6. Praise to the Holiest in the Height (Gerontius)
- Five Versets (composed in 1964. London: Novello, 1964):
1. Introduzione (in F major)
2. Tranquillamente (in F major)
3. Sempre simplicite (in B♭ major)
4. Poco allegretto (in G minor)
5. Alla marcia (in D minor)
- Three Improvisations (composed in 1965. London: Novello, 1965):
1. Intrada (in D minor)
2. Asperges Me (in D major)
3. Deo Gratias (in A major)
- Prayer and Praise: 13 Simple Organ Voluntaries (Borough Green: W. Paxton & Co. Ltd., 1975):
1. Prelude (in E♭ major; from: The Chapel in the Valley, Vol. 1, 1953)
2. Song Without Words (from: The Chapel in the Valley, Vol. 1, 1953)
3. Postlude (in D minor; from: The Chapel in the Valley, Vol. 2, 1953)
4. Communion (from: The Chapel in the Valley, Vol. 2, 1953)
5. Epilogue (in A major; from: The Chapel in the Valley, Vol. 2, 1953)
6. Aria (from: The Chapel in the Valley, Vol. 1, 1953)
7. Larghetto (from: The Chapel in the Valley, Vol. 1, 1953)
8. Trumpet Minuet (in G major; from: The Chapel in the Valley, Vol. 1, 1953)
9. Cradle Song (from: The Chapel in the Valley, Vol. 1, 1953)
10. Choral March (from: The Chapel in the Valley, Vol. 1, 1953)
11. Meditation on "Stracathro" – O, for a Closer Walk with God
12. Sarabande on "Vox Dilecti" – I Heard the Voice of Jesus Say
13. Triumphant March (in C major)
- Five Portraits for Home Organs (composed in 1980. Borough Green: W. Paxton & Co. Ltd., 1980):
1. Carol – LyricPpiece
2. Imogen – Fairy Tale
3. Elizabeth – Valse de Ballet
4. Justine – Romance
5. Mandy and Dula – Burmese Blues (Variant)

=== Posthumously published collections with organ works ===
- Aria – Thirteen pieces for organ (Bury St Edmonds: Kevin Mayhew, 1995):
1. Prelude on "St Cross" – O Come and Mourn with Me Awhile (from: Six Interludes on Passion Hymns, 1963)
2. Choral March (from: The Chapel in the Valley, Vol. 1, 1953)
3. Communion (from: The Chapel in the Valley, Vol. 2, 1953)
4. Solemn Procession (from: Fanfares and processionals: eight pieces for organ by modern composers,1961)
5. Prelude on "Passion Chorale" – O sacred head sore wounded (from: Six Interludes on Passion Hymns, 1963)
6. Prelude on "Rockingham" – When I Survey the Wondrous Cross (from: Six Interludes on Passion Hymns, 1963)
7. Festal March (from: The Chapel in the Valley, Vol. 2, 1953)
8. Prelude on "Gerontius" – Praise to the Holiest in the Height (from: Six Interludes on Passion Hymns, 1963)
9. Aria (from: The Chapel in the Valley, Vol. 1, 1953)
10. Verset (in G minor; from: Five Versets, 1964)
11. Prelude on "Winchester New" – Ride On, Ride On in Majesty (from: Six Interludes on Passion Hymns, 1963)
12. Vesper Hymn (from: The Chapel in the Valley, Vol. 1, 1953)
13. Meditation on "Stracathro" – O, for a Closer Walk with God (from: Prayer and Praise: 13 Simple Organ Voluntaries, 1975)
- Eight varied pieces (London: Bosworth & Co. Ltd, 1995):
1. Arietta in A major (composed in 1957)
2. Minuet (in G minor; from: Suite in B♭ major, 1951)
3. Recessional (in E♭ major; from: Three Voluntaries, 1950)
4. Andantino alla Cantilena (from: Beside the Still Waters: Six Introductory Improvisations, 1952)
5. Introit (from: Three Voluntaries, 1950)
6. Dedication March (in F major; composed in 1953)
7. Pastorale (from: Four Quiet Interludes, 1956)
8. Epilogue (in A major; from: Four Epilogues, 1953)
- Centenary Collection Organ (Bury St Edmonds: Kevin Mayhew, 2014):
  - Noël Nouvelet (from: Six Interludes on Christmas Carols, 1960)
  - Song Without Words (from: The Chapel in the Valley, Vol. 1, 1953)
  - Trumpet Minuet (in G major; from: The Chapel in the Valley, Vol. 1, 1953)
  - God rest ye merry, gentlemen (from: Six Interludes on Christmas Carols, 1960)
  - The Coventry Carol (from: Six Interludes on Christmas Carols, 1960)
  - Good King Wenceslas (from: Six Interludes on Christmas Carols, 1960)
  - Prelude on "St Cross" (from: Six Interludes on Passion Hymns, 1963)
  - Choral March (in B♭ major; from: The Chapel in the Valley, Vol. 1, 1953)
  - Communion (from: The Chapel in the Valley, Vol. 2, 1953)
  - Festal March (in E♭ major; from: The Chapel in the Valley, Vol. 2, 1953)
  - Solemn Procession (from: Fanfares and processionals: Eight pieces for organ by modern composers, 1961)
  - Prelude on "Passion chorale" (from: Six Interludes on Passion Hymns, 1963)
  - Prelude on "Rockingham" (from: Six Interludes on Passion Hymns, 1963)
  - Prelude on "Gerontius" (from: Six Interludes on Passion Hymns, 1963)
  - Aria (from: The Chapel in the Valley, Vol. 1, 1953)
  - Verset (in G minor; from: Five Versets, 1964)
  - Prelude on "Winchester New" (from: Six Interludes on Passion Hymns, 1963)
  - Vesper Hymn (from: The Chapel in the Valley, Vol. 1, 1953)
  - Meditation on "Stracathro" (from: Prayer and Praise: 13 Simple Organ Voluntaries, 1975)
  - Slumber Song (from: Six Sketches, 1956)
  - Prelude (in E♭ major; from: The Chapel in the Valley, Vol. 2, 1953)
  - Summer Pastures (from: Six Sketches, 1956)
  - Christ in the tomb from „The Divine Compassion“ (composed in 1954)
  - Romance (from: Six Sketches, 1956)
  - Intermezzo (from: Six Sketches, 1956)
  - Postlude (in G major; from: Six Sketches, 1956)
  - Arietta in A major (composed in 1957)
  - Minuet (in G minor; from: Suite in B Flat major, 1951)
  - Recessional (in E♭ major; from: Three Voluntaries, 1950)
  - Andantino alla Cantilena (from: Beside the Still Waters: Six Introductory Improvisations, 1952)
  - Introit (from: Three Voluntaries, 1950)
  - Dedication March (in F major; composed in 1953)
  - Pastorale (By the waters of Babylon) (from: Four Quiet Interludes, 1956)
  - Epilogue (in A major; from: Four Epilogues, 1953)
  - Chorale, Cantilena and Finale (composed in 1958)
  - Three Recital Pieces (composed in 1952)
  - Five Portraits for Home Organs (composed in 1980)

== Chamber music ==
- Fantasy Trio for violin, cello and piano (composed in 1936. London: Stainer & Bell, 1997)
- Sonatina for flute and piano (composed in 1941. London: Hinrichsen, 1941)
- Benedictus for violin and organ (composed in 1942. London: Stainer & Bell, 1997)
- Nocturne for cello and piano or harp (composed in 1948. London: Stainer & Bell, 1997)
- Sonatina for viola and piano (composed in 1951. London: Stainer & Bell, 1952)
- Air and Variations for clarinet in B♭ and piano (composed in 1952. London: Stainer & Bell, 1952)
- Suite in F major for trumpet and piano (composed in 1952. London: Stainer & Bell, 1998)
- Three Pieces for cello and piano (composed in 1951. Bury St Edmonds: Kevin Mayhew, 1995)
1. Air Varié (adapted from Tantum Ergo by César Franck)
2. Slumber Song
3. In the Half-Light. A soliloquy
- Music for the pipes: a suite for treble, alto, tenor & bass pipes (composed in 1955. London: Augener, 1955)
- Country Impressions (composed in 1960):
  - Mulberry Cottage for flute and piano (London: Ascherberg, Hopwood & Crew, 1960)
  - Northington Farm: Rustic Rondino for bassoon and piano (London: Stainer & Bell, 1960)
  - On Frensham Pond. Aquarelles for clarinet and piano (London: Stainer & Bell, 1960)
- Summer Pastures: Friesian elegy for horn and piano (composed in 1960. London: Stainer & Bell, 1960)
- A Lyric Suite for cello and piano (composed in 1964. London: Stainer & Bell, 1964)
- The Gardens at Eastwell. A Late Summer Impression for flute and piano or harp (composed in 1982, arranged by Pam Chowhan. London: Stainer & Bell, 1997)

== Piano ==
=== Piano solo ===
- Four Pieces (composed in 1950. London: Francis, Day & Hunter, 1950):
1. Frolic
2. Air
3. Scherzo
4. Lullaby
- Three Spring Miniatures (composed in 1952. London: William Elkin, 1953):
1. Gossamer (A Little Waltz)
2. Willow Song (A lament)
3. Tree Tops (A Toccatina)
- Recreations – Six Pieces (composed in 1953. London: Joseph Williams, 1953):
1. A Song for the Morning
2. Scherzo in G minor
3. Arabesque
4. Romantic Evening
5. Explanation
6. Song without Words
- Six Graded Pieces (composed in 1955. London: Ascherberg, Hopwood & Crew, 1955)
1. Prelude in C major
2. Country Carol
3. Air and three Variations
4. Pastorale
5. A Short Tone-Study
6. Presto for Perseus

=== Piano four hands ===
- River Song (Bury St Edmonds: Kevin Mayhew)

=== Two Pianos ===
- Danse Macabre (Bury St Edmonds: Kevin Mayhew)

=== Posthumously published collection with piano works ===
- Three Pieces (Bury St Edmonds: Kevin Mayhew, 1996):
1. Presto for Perseus (from: Six Graded Pieces, 1955)
2. Autumn Elf
3. Badinage de Noel
- Scenes from Childhood – Seven Pieces (Bury St Edmonds: Kevin Mayhew, 1995):
1. A Short Tone-Study (from: Six Graded Pieces, 1955)
2. Air
3. Cake Walk
4. China Doll
5. Evening Hymn
6. Scherzo in G minor (from: Recreations – Six Pieces, 1953)
7. Sentimental Waltz

== Orchestra ==
- Lento in E major for string orchestra (composed in 1939. London: Hinrichsen, 1940)
- Waltz in E minor (composed in 1939. Tewkesbury: Goodmusic, 2003)
- Aurora, Tone Poem (composed in 1948. London: The Really Useful Group, 1986)
- Three Spring Miniatures for small orchestra (composed in 1952);
  - Gossamer (A Little Waltz)
  - Willow Song (A lament)
  - Tree Tops (A Toccatina)
- Serenade for Strings (London: The Really Useful Group, 1986)
1. Barcarolle (composed in 1951)
2. Romance (composed in 1980)
3. Elegy (composed in 1960)
- Invocation for harp, timpani and string orchestra (composed in 1957. London: Francis Day and Hunter, 1957)
- The Moon. Miniature for string orchestra (composed in 1959. Laggan Bridge: Spartan Press Music Publishers Ltd, 2014)

== Sacred vocal music ==
=== Oratorio ===
- St. Francis of Assisi for soprano, tenor, baritone, choir, string orchestra, and harp (composed in 1948. Bury St Edmonds: Kevin Mayhew)

=== Masses ===
- Missa Princeps Pacis for choir SATB and organ (composed in 1962. Bury St Edmonds: Kevin Mayhew, 1997)
- Missa Sanctae Mariae Magdalenae for choir SATB and organ (composed in 1979. Bury St Edmonds: Kevin Mayhew, 1996)

=== Communion Services and Magnificat ===
- Magnificat and Nunc Dimittis in E minor for choir SATB and organ (composed in 1956. London: Novello, 1956)
- Communion Service in E minor for choir SATB and organ (composed in 1957. London: Novello, 1957)
- Communion Service in D minor for unison choir and organ (composed in 1963. London: Novello, 1963)

=== Cantatas ===
- Songs of Spring. Cantata for women's choir and piano (composed in 1953. London: Bosworth & Co. Ltd., 1953)
- The Divine Compassion. Cantata for tenor, baritone, choir SATB, and organ (composed in 1954. London: Francis, Day & Hunter, 1954)
- Look on the fields: A harvest cantata for tenor and baritone solo, choir SATB, congregation, and organ (composed in 1955. London: Francis, Day & Hunter, 1955)
- The Saviour: A meditation upon the death of Christ for choir SATB and organ (composed in 1961. London: Novello, 1961)
- The Good Samaritan. Cantata for bass solo, choir SATB and organ (composed in 1964. London: Novello, 1964)
- Born a King. Christmas cantata for soloists, choir SATB and organ (Bury St Edmonds: Kevin Mayhew, 1993)

=== Anthems ===
- O Lord, Spread thy Wings o'er me. for soprano, choir SATB and accompaniment (composed in 1952. London: Edwin Ashdown, 1952)
- O for a closer Walk with God for choir SAB and organ (composed in 1957. London: Novello, 1957)
- O Holy Spirit, Lord of Grace for choir SAB and organ (composed in 1957. London: Novello, 1957)
- Sing, O Heavens for choir SAB and organ (composed in 1957. London: Novello, 1957)
- Come, praise your Lord and Saviour for choir SATB and organ (composed in 1958. London: Novello, 1958)
- Just as I am, thine own to be for choir SATB and organ (composed in 1958. London: Novello, 1958)
- Most glorious Lord of Lyfe! for choir SATB (composed in 1959. London: Novello, 1959)
- The church with joy acclaims her Lord for choir SATB and organ (composed in 1960. London: Novello, 1960)
- Just as I am, thine own to be for unison chorus and organ (composed in 1961. London: Novello, 1961)
- Unite to praise thy Maker's name for choir SATB and organ (composed in 1961. London: Novello, 1961)
- A Hymn of Thanksgiving for unison chorus and descant (composed in 1964. New York: Gray, 1964)
- Beneath the Glory of the Skies for choir SATB and organ (composed in 1965. London: Novello, 1965)
- Glory and praise and dominion be thine for choir SATB and organ (composed in 1965. London: Novello, 1965)
- Love divine, all Loves excelling for choir SATB (composed in 1966. London: Novello, 1966)
- A child my choice: Christmas Anthem for choir SATB a cappella (composed in 1967. London: Novello, 1967)
- In wonder, love and praise: a collection of fourteen anthems for choir SATB and organ (composed in 1978. London: Novello, 1978)
- Spirit of God for choir SATB and organ (Bury St Edmonds: Kevin Mayhew)
- Dominus Firmamentum Meum for choir SATB and organ (Bury St Edmonds: Kevin Mayhew)
- Lo! My Shepherd is Divine for soprano, alto, choir SATB, and organ (Bury St Edmonds: Kevin Mayhew)
- Tantum Ergo for bass, choir ATB and organ (Bury St Edmonds: Kevin Mayhew)

=== Various sacred vocal works ===
- Then come, all ye People. A Christmas Carol for choir SATB (composed in 1954. London: Francis, Day & Hunter, 1954)
- My savior was born: Carol for choir SATB (composed in 1958. London: Novello, 1958)
- Shepherd of Bethlehem: Carol for choir SATB (composed in 1958. London: Novello, 1958)
- The Festival of Life: Easter Carol for choir SATB (composed in 1959. London: Novello, 1959)
- Four Introits for choir SATB and organ (composed in 1959. London: A. Weekes & Co., 1959)
1. Be still, my Soul
2. Let your Light so shine
3. Lo, God is here
4. Jesus, where'er Thy People meet
- He walks unseen. Sacred part-song for choir a cappella (composed in 1959. London: A. Weekes & Co., 1959)
- The Christmas company: Carol for choir SATB (composed in 1961. London: Novello, 1961)
- Two carol-songs for children (composed in 1963. London: Francis, Day & Hunter, 1963):
1. A lowly Thing for Jesus
2. The Manger bright
- Six Motets for choir SATB (composed in 1963. London: L. J. Cary & Co., 1963)
- God is Good for choir SATB a cappella (composed in 1964. London: Novello, 1964)
- Meeting Place: A Meditation upon the birth of Christ for baritone, choir SATB and piano or organ (composed in 1964. London: Novello, 1964)
- The winter is past: Easter Carol for choir SATB (composed in 1964. London: Novello, 1964)
- Sing the Life: Easter Carol for choir SATB (composed in 1965. London: Novello, 1965)
- The Winter is past: Easter Carol for choir SATB (composed in 1965. London: Novello, 1965)
- Jesus, dear Jesus. A Christmas Song for Children (composed in 1966. London: Edwin Ashdown, 1966)
- Three Arias for tenor and organ (Bury St Edmonds: Kevin Mayhew):
  - And I saw a new Heaven
  - The King of Love (from: The Savior, 1961)
  - Thou art the King (from: The Divine Compassion, 1954)
- The Stable where the Oxen stood (The Manger Bright) for unison chorus and piano (Bury St Edmonds: Kevin Mayhew)
- New Life in Christ for choir SATB and organ

=== Posthumously published collection of sacred vocal music ===
- Seven Anthems (Bury St Edmonds: Kevin Mayhew):
  - Sing the Life – Easter Carol (composed in 1965)
  - A Hymn of Thanksgiving (composed in 1964)
  - O Love, I give myself to Thee
  - O for a closer walk with God (composed in 1957)
  - Then come, all ye People – Carol (composed in 1954)
  - The Lord is my Shepherd
  - Love divine, all Loves excelling (composed in 1966)

== Secular vocal music ==
=== Choral ensemble ===
- Dabbling in the Dew for choir SATB a cappella (composed in 1950. London: Francis, Day & Hunter, 1950)
- Sun-Gold for women's choir and piano (composed in 1951. London: Francis, Day & Hunter, 1951)
- Songs of spring. Cantata for three-part women's choir (composed in 1953. London: Francis, Day & Hunter, 1953)
- The haunted highway for unison chorus and piano (composed in 1954. London: J. Curwen and Sons, 1954)
- School's out for unison chorus (composed in 1960. London: Novello, 1960)
- April for women's choir and piano
- Lament for women's choir and piano
- A Magic Morn for women's choir and piano

=== Part-Songs ===
- A piper. Three-part-song for women's or children's choir and piano (composed in 1951. London: Edward Arnold & Co., 1951)
- I looked out into the morning. Two-part-song for choir a cappella (composed in 1951. London: Francis, Day & Hunter, 1951)
- Bright is the Ring of Words. Part-song for four-part men's chorus a cappella (composed in 1952. London: William Elkin, 1952)
- Moon Silver. Two-part-song for choir a cappella (composed in 1952. London: Francis, Day & Hunter, 1952)
- The call of the morning. Two-part-song for choir a cappella (composed in 1953. London: Francis, Day & Hunter, 1953)
- Corinna’s Lute. Part-song for women's choir and piano (composed in 1953. London: Chappell & Co., 1953)
- Sweet Isabell. Part-song for choir SATB a cappella (composed in 1953. London: Joseph Williams, 1953)
- Thank God for Life. Two-part-song for choir a cappella (composed in 1953. London: Francis, Day & Hunter, 1953)
- Bethlehem. Two-part-song for women's choir a cappella (composed in 1954. London: Francis, Day & Hunter, 1954)
- A cottage window. Three-part-song for women's choir a cappella (composed in 1954. London: William Elkin, 1954)
- I heard a Rush of Wings. Three-part-song for women's or children's choir and piano (composed in 1954. London: Francis, Day & Hunter, 1954)
- Gipsy life. Two-part-song for women's choir and piano (composed in 1954. London: J. Curwen and Sons, 1954)
- Morning in Spring. Two-part-song for women's choir and piano (composed in 1954. London: J. Curwen and Sons, 1954)
- The Lyre of Orpheus. For songs for three-part women's choir a cappella (composed in 1954. London: William Elkin, 1954)
- Go fetch to me a pint o' wine. Part-song for men's chorus a cappella (composed in 1955. London: William Elkin, 1955)
- Invitation. Two-part-song for women's choir a cappella (composed in 1956. London: Ascherberg, Hopwood & Crew, 1956)
- Lamourie Fair. Three-part-song for women's choir a cappella (composed in 1956. London: Ascherberg, Hopwood & Crew, 1956)
- Derbyshire austerity. Part-song for men's chorus a cappella (composed in 1957. London: J. Curwen and Sons, 1957)
- Margery. Part-song for choir SATB a cappella (composed in 1960. London: Novello, 1960)
- The Moon. Part-song for choir SATB a cappella (composed in 1960. London: Novello, 1960)
- A mountain so high. Two-part-song for choir a cappella (composed in 1961. London: Novello, 1961)
- The Heather Hills. Part-song for three-part women's choir and piano (composed in 1961. London: Novello, 1961)
- Jamie Brown: a happy story in song for two-part choir and piano (composed in 1962. London: Ascherberg, Hopwood & Crew, 1962)
- The Rose. Two-part-song for choir a cappella (composed in 1963. London: Novello, 1963)
- The fiddler of Dooney. Two-part-song for choir a cappella (composed in 1964. London: Ascherberg, Hopwood & Crew, 1964)
- O lovely day: a two-part-song for Easter for two-part choir a cappella (composed in 1966. London: Edwin Ashdown, 1966)
- The Reaper: a two-part-song for harvest time for choir a cappella (composed in 1966. London: Edwin Ashdown, 1966)

== Songs with piano ==
- The Call of the Morning (composed in 1950); words by George Darley (London: Francis, Day & Hunter, 1951)
- Love, Like a Drop of Dew (composed in 1950); words by W. H. Davies (London: Chappell & Co., 1950)
- The Pretty Washer-Maiden (composed in 1950); words by William Ernest Henley (London: Chappell & Co., 1950)
- Four bibulous songs for baritone and piano (composed in 1951. London: Novello, 1951)
- I Looked Out into the Morning (composed in 1951); words by James Thomson (B.V.) (London: Francis, Day & Hunter, 1951)
- Over the Bridge (composed in 1951); words by James Thomson (B.V.) (London: Chappell & Co., 1951)
- So Lovely the Rose (composed in 1951); words by Joseph Murrells (London: Chappell & Co., 1951)
- Eutopia (composed in 1953); words by Francis Turner Palgrave (London: William Elkin, 1953)
- To the Wicklow Hills (composed in 1954); words by R.G. Leigh (London: Ascherberg, Hopwood & Crew, 1954)
- The Milkmaid (composed in 1957. London: William Elkin, 1957)
- Lullaby (Bury St Edmonds: Kevin Mayhew)
- Spring is the Time for Love (Bury St Edmonds: Kevin Mayhew)
- Sun-Gold (Bury St Edmonds: Kevin Mayhew)

=== Posthumously published collection of songs with piano ===
- The Songs of William Lloyd Webber (Bury St Edmonds: Kevin Mayhew, 1995):
  - I looked out into the Morning (composed in 1951)
  - Over the Bridge (composed in 1951)
  - How do I love Thee
  - The Forest of Wild Thyme (composed in 1951)
  - The pretty Washer-Maiden (composed in 1950)
  - A Rent for Love
  - To the Wicklow Hills (composed in 1954)
  - So lovely the Rose (composed in 1951)
  - Eutopia (composed in 1953)
  - The Cottage of Dreams
