= Missa brevis =

Form of mass

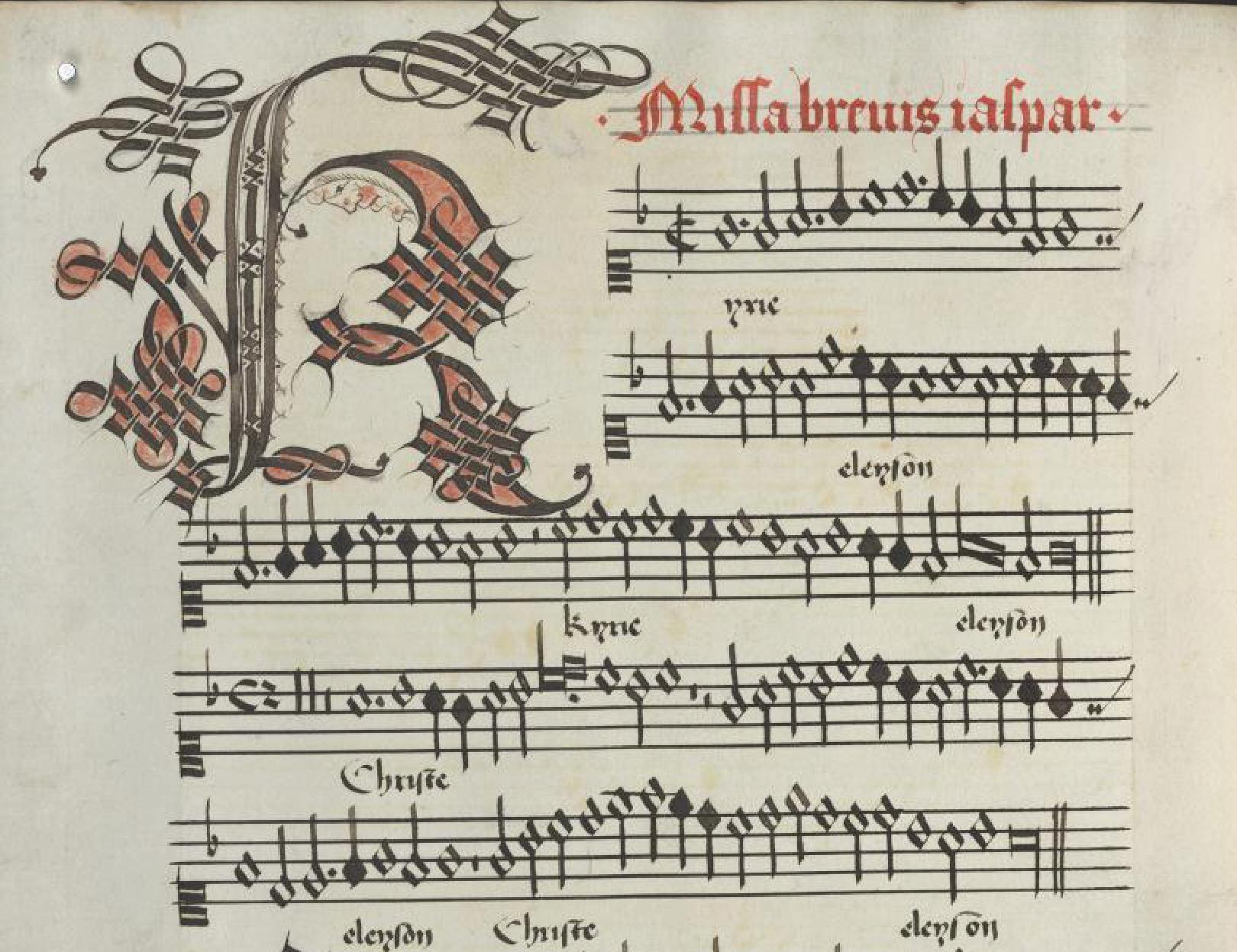
Start of Gaspar van Weerbeke's Missa brevis in Choirbook, D-Ju MS 21

Missa brevis (Latin for 'short Mass'; plural: Missae breves) usually refers to a Mass composition that is short because part of the text of the Mass ordinary that is usually set to music in a full Mass is left out, or because its execution time is relatively short.

== Full mass with a relatively short execution time ==
The concise approach is found in the mostly syllabic settings of the 16th century, and in the custom of "telescoping" (or simultaneous singing by different voices) in 18th-century Masses. After the period when all church music was performed a cappella, a short execution time usually also implied modest forces for performance, that is: apart from Masses in the "brevis et solemnis" genre.

=== Polyphony ===
- Orlande de Lassus: Missa venatorum ('Hunters' Mass')
- Giovanni Pierluigi da Palestrina: Missa Brevis
- Andrea Gabrieli: Missa brevis quatuor vocum
- Gaspar van Weerbeke: Missa brevis

=== Classical period ===
For composers of the classical period such as Mozart, missa brevis meant "short in duration" – as opposed to missa longa (long Mass), a term that Leopold Mozart used for his son's K. 262 – rendering the complete words of the liturgy. As the words were well known some composers had different voice parts recite simultaneously different sections of long texts. This is especially characteristic of Austrian Masses in the Gloria and the Credo.

- Johann Georg Albrechtsberger: Mass in D major (A.I.11, 1783), Missa Sancti Augustini (A.I.17, 1784)
- Carl Heinrich Biber: Missa brevis sanctorum septem dolorum B.V.M. (1731)
- František Brixi: Missa aulica, Missa brevis in C
- Joseph Haydn: Missa brevis in F (1749) and Missa brevis Sancti Joannis de Deo (Little Organ Mass) (1775), among others
- Michael Haydn: provided alternative "brevis" settings for the Gloria and the Credo in his Missa Sancti Gabrielis
- Leopold Mozart, including some Missae breves formerly attributed to his son Wolfgang Amadeus
- Wolfgang Amadeus Mozart – Brevis: K. 49, K. 65, K. 140, K. 192, K. 194, K. 275; Brevis et solemnis: K. 220, K. 257, K. 258, K. 259; Alternatively indicated as brevis or longa: K. 317

=== 19th century ===
- Alexandre Guilmant: Messe brève, Op.9 (1856)
- Johann Gustav Eduard Stehle: Kurze und leichte Messe, Op.50 (Short and Easy Mass in Honor of the Blessed Virgin Mary, 1883)

== Kyrie–Gloria Masses ==
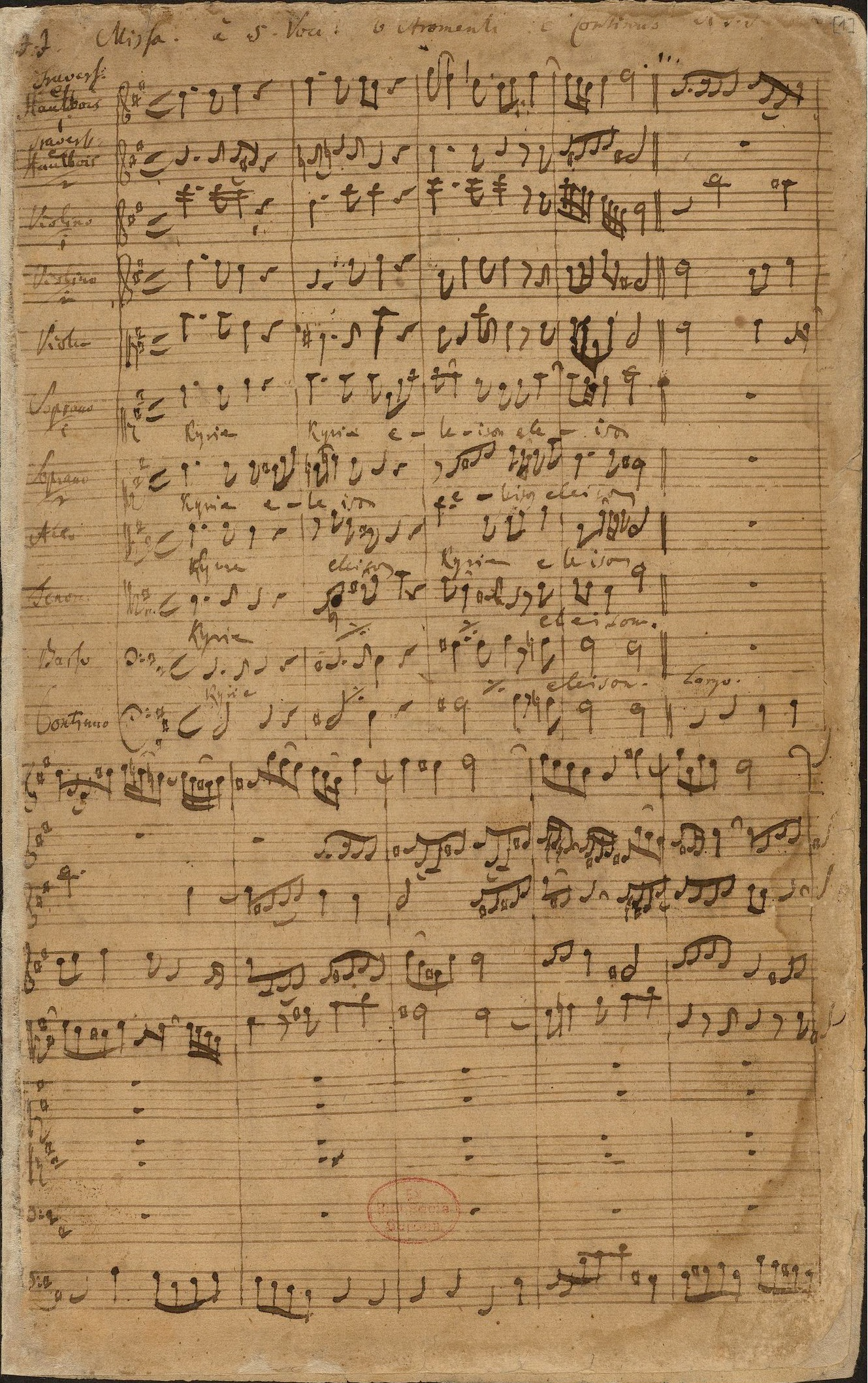
Start of the Kyrie of Johann Sebastian Bach's Mass in B minor, originally composed as the start of a Kyrie–Gloria Mass in B minor dedicated to Frederick Augustus II, Elector of Saxony, when he came to power in 1733. The original Kyrie–Gloria mass was composed in 12 movements for SSATB soloists and choir, and an extensive baroque orchestra. It was probably because of its long duration that the score was archived in the Royal Library upon arrival in Dresden, instead of being added to the repertoire of the Catholic Hofkirche.

Partial settings are seen in both the Roman and Lutheran traditions, where many works consist of the Kyrie and Gloria. These masses came to be called Missae breves because they are shorter in words, the opposite being Missae totae (complete Masses).

=== Baroque period ===
Protestant liturgies did not have a mandated set of Mass ordinary sections to be included in a Mass composition. Thus, in addition to settings of all five sections (e.g. Hieronymus Praetorius, Christoph Demantius), there are many Kurzmessen (short masses) that include settings of only the Kyrie, Gloria, and Sanctus (e.g. Stephan Otto, Andreas Hammerschmidt). From the early 17th century, many Kurzmessen consist only of Kyrie and Gloria sections, e.g. those by Bartholomäus Gesius (eight out of ten Masses included in his 1611 Missae ad imitationem cantionum Orlandi).

In the second half of the 17th century the Kyrie–Gloria Kurzmesse was the prevalent type in Lutheranism, with composers like Sebastian Knüpfer, Christoph Bernhard, Johann Theile, Friedrich Zachow and Johann Philipp Krieger. Gottfried Vopelius included a Kyrie–Gloria Mass in Gregorian chant on pages 421 to 423 of his Neu Leipziger Gesangbuch (1682), introducing its Gloria as "... what the old church has done furthermore in praise of the Holy Trinity".

In the first half of the 18th century Kyrie–Gloria Masses could also be seen as a Catholic/Lutheran crossover, for example for Johann Sebastian Bach: not only did he transform one of Palestrina's a cappella missae totae in such a Kyrie–Gloria Mass for use in Lutheran practice, he also composed one in this format for the Catholic court in Dresden.

- Dietrich Buxtehude: Missa brevis, BuxWV 114
- Johann Theile: Missa brevis
- Johann Kuhnau's Mass in F major (Mügeln Mass), the only extant Mass composition of this composer, is a Kurzmesse.
- Friedrich Wilhelm Zachow: Missa super Christ lag in Todesbanden
- Antonio Caldara: Missa Providentiae
- Jan Dismas Zelenka wrote and acquired many Kyrie–Gloria Masses for the Dresden court, all of them later expanded into a Missa tota or into a Missa senza credo. For example, around 1728 Zelenka expanded Caldara's Missa Providentiae into a Missa tota, basing a Sanctus and Agnus Dei on Caldara's composition, and adding a newly composed Credo, ZWV 31.
- Johann Ludwig Bach: Missa super cantilena "Allein Gott in der Höh' sei Ehr", JLB 38 (1716), for some time attributed to Johann Nikolaus Bach. The Gloria section of this Mass intersperses the Latin text with all four stanzas of "Allein Gott in der Höh sei Ehr" as cantus firmus. The first measures of that section were amended by J. S. Bach in his Leipzig copy of the work (1729, BWV Anh. 166).
- Giovanni Battista Pergolesi: Messa di Sant' Emidio in F major for five voices and orchestra (1732)
- Johann Sebastian Bach wrote five Kyrie–Gloria masses: in 1733 he wrote the Mass for the Dresden court (quarter of a century later expanded into the Mass in B minor), and around 1738 he wrote four so-called Lutherische Messen, BWV 233–236. Kyrie–Gloria Masses Bach copied from other composers include BWV Anh. 25 and 167.
- Georg Philipp Telemann: several Kyrie–Gloria Masses, including Missa sopra 'Ach Gott im Himmel sieh darein', TWV 9:1, Missa sopra 'Durch Adams Fall ist ganz', TWV 9:4, Missa sopra 'Ein Kindelein so löbelich', TWV 9:5, Missa sopra 'Erbarm dich mein o Herre Gott', TWV 9:6, Missa sopra 'Es wird schier der letzte Tag herkommen', TWV 9:7 and Missa sopra 'Komm heiliger Geist', TWV 9:11
- Gottfried Heinrich Stölzel wrote several Masses consisting of a Kyrie and Gloria exclusively, including a Deutsche Messe (words in German) and a Missa Canonica (all movements as canons – this mass exists in several versions).

=== 19th century ===
- Antonio Bencini: Messa in pastorale (1810)
- Gioachino Rossini: Messa di Gloria (1820)

== Other partial settings ==
Some Mass settings consisting of only three or four sections of the Mass ordinary can be indicated with a specific name, rather than with the generic Missa brevis name:

- Missa (in) tempore (Adventus et) Quadragesimae: without Gloria
- Missa senza credo: without Credo
- Missa ferialis: without Gloria and Credo

Masses written for the Anglican liturgy often have no Credo (usually recited by the congregation and rarely sung to a choral setting in Anglican services) and no Agnus Dei. For American denominations, the Sanctus is usually without Benedictus. The Gloria section may be moved to the end of the composition.

Some Masses in this category are rather to be seen as incomplete, while the composer did not write all the movements that were originally planned, or while some movements went lost, but the extant part of the composition found its way to liturgical or concert practice recast as a Brevis.

Whatever the reason for omitting part of the text of the Mass ordinary from the musical setting, the umbrella term for such Masses became Missa brevis. Partial Mass settings that are not a Kyrie–Gloria Mass include:

- Johannes Ockeghem: Missa Sine Nomine (Kyrie – Gloria – Credo)
- Antonio Lotti: Missa brevis in F, Missa brevis in D Minor (Kyrie – Sanctus & Benedictus – Agnus Dei settings)
- The three Choral-Messen (Windhaager Messe, Kronstorfer Messe and Messe für den Gründonnerstag), all partial settings which Bruckner composed between 1842 and 1844, were intended for the celebration of the mass in the villages Windhaag and Kronstorf, where he was schoolteacher's assistant.
- Johannes Brahms: Missa canonica, WoO 18 – the composers only attempt to set the Mass, is composed of Sanctus, Benedictus and Agnus Dei only, a fourth movement, the Credo believed to have been completed five years after the other movements, is lost.
- Léo Delibes: Messe brève (1875, no Credo)
- Gabriel Fauré: Messe des pêcheurs de Villerville (1881, includes two movements composed by André Messager – partial setting); Messe basse (1906, based on the parts composed by Fauré of the former – Kyrie, Sanctus/Benedictus and Agnus Dei only)
- Erik Satie: Messe des pauvres (mid 1890s, Kyrie apparently incomplete, Gloria missing, several other non-Ordinary movements composed)
- William Lloyd Webber: Missa Princeps Pacis for choir and organ (1962, no Credo)
- Ralph Vaughan Williams, Cambridge Mass for SATB, double chorus & orchestra, 1899 (Sets only the Credo and Sanctus)

== Brevis for various reasons ==
From the late 19th century Missa brevis (or French: "Messe brève") may refer to a Mass composition with any combination of the following characteristics: (1) short execution time, (2) limited forces for performance, (3) leaving out part of the Mass ordinary and/or (4) the composition is incomplete so that the extant complete parts are seen as a Missa brevis. A Mass being short in this sense does however not exclude that sections based on texts outside the Mass ordinary are added to the composition (like the O Salutaris Hostia in several of Gounod's Messes brèves).

=== 19th century ===
As concert performance of liturgical works outside a liturgical setting increased, for some of the composers the brevis/solemnis distinction is about the breves, which not always needed professional performers, being intended for actual liturgical use, while a Missa solemnis was rather seen as a concert piece for professional performers, that could be performed outside an actual Mass celebration, similar to how an oratorio would be staged.

- Charles Gounod:
  - CG 63: Vokalmesse pour la fête de l'Annonciation in C minor (five voices a cappella, 1843)
  - CG 64: Mass No. 1 in A♭ major (three voice parts and organ, 1844)
  - CG 65: Mass No. 2 in C major (no Credo, 1845 – publ. 1872), and later revision Messe brève No. 5 en ut majeur à trois voix d'hommes, soli et choeurs (Messe Brève aux séminaires – 1870, rev. & publ. 1892)
  - CG 66: Messe brève et salut pour 4 voix d'hommes in C minor, Op. 1 (c. 1845, publ. 1846)
  - CG 67: Messe à 4 voix d'hommes No. 2 in C major (without Gloria, incomplete, c. 1845)
  - CG 68: Messe à 4 voix d'hommes No. 3 in A minor (without Gloria, only Kyrie extant, c. 1845)
  - CG 69: Messe à 5 voix libres in E♭ minor (incomplete, c. 1848 – Kyrie published in 1878)
  - CG 70: Messe No. 1 à 3 voix d'hommes in C minor (aux Orphéonistes, 1853)
  - CG 71: Messe brève No. 2 pour choeur d'hommes in G major (Messe pour les sociétés chorales, 1862), and its later revisions: Messe No. 3 à trois voix égales (Messe aux communautés religieuses, c. 1882, publ. 1891) and Messe brève no. 6 aux cathédrales pour solistes choeur et orgue (1890, publ. 1893)
  - CG 72: Messe brève No. 4 à deux voix égales (Messe à la Congrégation des dames auxiliatrice de l'Immaculée-Conception, no Credo – 1876), revision as Messe brève No. 7 aux chapelles (1890, publ. 1893)
  - CG 73: Messe des anges gardiens in C major (SATB soloists and choir, 1872)
  - CG 74: Messe à la mémoire de Jeanne d'Arc libératrice et martyre in F major (no Credo 1886–1887)
  - CG 78 and 79: Messe brève pour les morts en fa majeur (Introit/Kyrie – Sanctus – Pie Jesu – Agnus Dei, 1871 – publ. 1873), and a later reworking (1875)
  - CG 147b: Messe funèbre in F major (Kyrie – Sanctus – Pie Jesu – Agnus Dei, 1865 – publ. 1883) is a parody by Jules Dormois of Gounod's Les Sept paroles de Notre Seigneur Jésus-Christ sur la croix

=== 20th century ===
- Richard Rodney Bennett: Missa Brevis (1990)
- Lennox Berkeley: Missa Brevis, Op. 57 (1960)
- Leonard Bernstein: Missa Brevis (1989 – without Credo)
- Benjamin Britten: Missa Brevis (1959 – without Credo)
- Lorenzo Ferrero: Missa Brevis, for five voices and two synthesizers (1975)
- Vivian Fine: Missa Brevis for Four Cellos and Taped Voice (1972)
- Ernst Fuchs-Schönbach: Missa brevis, Op. 20 for three-part mixed choir
- Zoltán Kodály: Missa Brevis for soloists, chorus and organ (1942, 1948)
- Lowell Liebermann: Missa Brevis, Op. 15 (1985)
- Frank Martin
- Vytautas Miškinis: Missa Brevis "Pro pace"
- Knut Nystedt: Missa brevis, Op. 102 (1984)
- Stephen Paulus
- Brian Ferneyhough: Missa Brevis (1969)
- William Walton: Missa brevis, for double mixed chorus and organ (1966)
- Christopher Wood: Missa Brevis, for choir and organ
- Philip Stopford: Keble Missa Brevis, for the choir and organ of Keble College, Oxford (1997)

=== 21st century ===
- Carlotta Ferrari: Missa brevis canonica (2017), Missa brevis cantilena (2017), Missa brevis gregoriana (2017), Missa brevis per baritono e organo (2017), Missa brevis minima (2023)
- Andrew Ford: Missa Brevis for SATB choir and organ (2015)
- Douglas Knehans: Missa Brevis for SATB and organ (2010)
- Arvo Pärt: Missa brevis for eight cellos (Kyrie – Sanctus – Agnus Dei, 2009–2010)
- Krzysztof Penderecki: Missa brevis for chorus a capella (2013)
- Gerhard Präsent: Missa minima (2001)

== Sources ==
- Rimbach, Evangeline (2005). "The Sacred Vocal Music of Johann Kuhnau". In Messerli, Carlos R. (ed.). Thine the Amen: Essays on Lutheran Church Music in Honor of Carl Schalk. Marty, Martin E. (Foreword). Kirk House Publishers. pp. 83–110. ISBN 9781932688115.
