= Brixi =

Brixi is a Czech surname, derived from the Latin name Brikcius. Notable people with the surname include:

- František Brixi (1732–1771), Czech composer
- Šimon Brixi (1693–1735), Czech composer and organist

== See also ==
- Bricius (disambiguation)
- František Brikcius, Czech cellist
