= Missa Sanctae Mariae Magdalenae =

- Mass by William Lloyd Webber
- Text: Mass Ordinary
- Language: Latin
- Composed: 1979
- Vocal: Choir
- Instrumental: Organ

The Missa Sanctae Mariae Magdalenae (Mass of St. Mary Magdalene) is a mass composed by English composer William Lloyd Webber in 1979 for choir and organ.

Lloyd Webber, who was the father of the composer Andrew Lloyd Webber and the cellist Julian Lloyd Webber, was the organist and choirmaster of All Saints, Margaret Street, London between 1939 and 1948. From 1958 he served as director of music at the Methodist Central Hall, Westminster. During this time, he composed two Latin masses for choir and organ, Missa Princeps Pacis in 1962 and Missa Sanctae Mariae Magdalenae in 1979.

The mass sets all part of the Mass Ordinary, except the Credo as it is customary in the Anglican Church, and is thus a missa brevis. It was published by Kevin Mayhew. A new edition appeared in 2014, to mark the composer's centenary.

The mass was recorded in 1996, with the Hickox Singers conducted by Richard Hickox. A reviewer notes: " The Mass shows impressive contrapuntal craftsmanship and the Hickox Singers display great precision and clarity."

== Structure ==
Webber structured the text in five movements:

1. Kyrie
2. Gloria
3. Sanctus
4. Agnus Dei
5. Ite missa est
