= K140 =

K140 or K-140 may refer to:

- K-140 (Kansas highway), a state highway in Kansas
- Mass in G major, K. 140 "Pastoral"
- Soviet submarine K-140
