= Windhaager Messe =

- Mass by Anton Bruckner
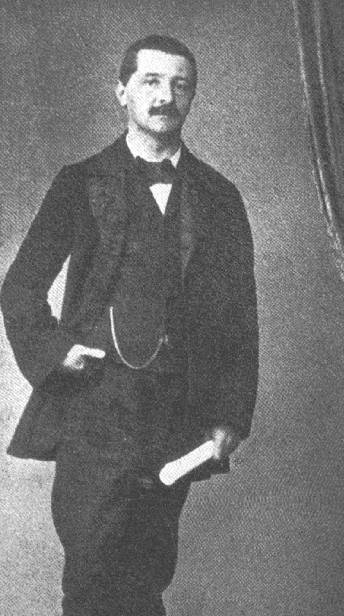
- The young Bruckner
- Key: C major
- Catalogue: WAB 25
- Form: Missa brevis
- Composed: 1842: Windhaag
- Dedication: Anna Jobst
- Published: 1932: Regensburg
- Movements: 6
- Vocal: Alto soloist
- Instrumental: Organ and two horns

The Windhaager Messe, WAB 25, is a missa brevis composed by Anton Bruckner in 1842.

== History ==
Bruckner composed the Windhaager Messe (WAB 25) in 1842, while he was a schoolteacher's assistant in Windhaag.

It was first believed that it was composed for Maria Jobst, the alto soloist in the Windhaag church choir. It is now stated that it was composed for her younger sister, Anna.

The work, the manuscript of which is stored in the archive of Wels, was first published in band I, pp. 173–189 of the Göllerich/Auer biography. It is edited in Band XXI/2 of the Gesamtausgabe.

== Setting ==
The Windhaager Messe is a Missa brevis in C major for alto solo, two horns and organ.

The work is divided into six parts:

1. Kyrie, C major
2. Gloria, C major
3. Credo, C major
4. Sanctus, C major
5. Benedictus, E♭ major
6. Agnus Dei, C major

Total duration: 8 to 10 minutes.

The work employs a text compressed to the absolute minimum and is predominantly homophonic in texture – often close to plainchant as, for example, the initial phrase of the Kyrie and the Credo – with occasional contrapuntal interruptions. The organ part consists of the alto solo line and a mostly unfigured bass. The use of horns "adds a warm, familiar timbre to music, and helps to clarify the harmony".

As in the Landmesse tradition, the Gloria and the Credo employ only a portion of the extensive text usually associated with these sections of the Mass. Such short masses (Missa brevis) were frequently performed in Austrian country churches, especially during Advent and Lent.

The short Sanctus presents the most extensive horn parts in the work. The Benedictus, in E♭ major, is more melodic and uses a much less syllabic text setting than the rest of the work. The final notes of the Agnus Dei recall the closing of the Credo – a small, but effective touch of musical integration.

Bruckner’s designation of this composition as a Choral-Messe referred to its simple, hymn-like style. Tonally the work follows conventional harmonic patterns, but, as Bruckner was to do throughout his life, it also contains frequent modulations, often to rather distant keys, without the uses of pivot chords. The frequent appearances of unison passages throughout this work are an additional hallmark of Bruckner’s later style. Kinder concludes his analysis as:

...the attention lavished to this modest work is justified, not merely because it was Bruckner's first extended composition, but also because of its interesting and prophetic musical ideas.

== Use in the modern liturgy ==
To make the Windhaager Messe usable for Eucharist celebration Kajetan Schmidinger and Joseph Messner made in C. 1927 an arrangement for mixed choir with revised Gloria and Credo, and accompaniment by organ, horns and string quintet.

== Selected discography ==
=== Original setting ===
A selection among the recordings of the original setting of the Mass:

- Wolfgang Riedelbauch, Ingeborg Ruß (alto), Anton Bruckner - Psalm 146 and Windhaager Messe – LP: Colosseum SM 548, 1972.
  Transferred to CD, together with the historical recording of the "nullified" Symphony in D minor by Hortense von Gelmini: Klassic Haus KHCD 2012-007, 2012
- Ulrich Köbl, Cornelia Wulkopf (alto), Sakrale Waldhornmusik – CD: Ars FCD 368 304, c. 1988
- Rupert Gottfried Frieberger, Sigrid Hagmüller (alto), Anton Bruckner – Oberösterreichische Kirchenmusik – Fabian Records CD 5112, 1995
- Bernhard Prammer, Elisabeth Mayer (alto), Kammermusikalische Kostbarkeiten von Anton Bruckner – CD: Weinberg Records SW 01 036-2, 1996
- Valeri Polyansky, Ludmila Kunetsova (mezzo-soprano), Bruckner - Mass in C major, Mass No. 2 in E minor – Chandos CD CHAN 9863, 1998
- Matthias Giesen, Günther Groissböck (bass), In Te Domine Speravi – Gramola CD 99327, 2024

=== Schmidinger & Messner's arrangement ===
- Svetlana Girba, KHG-Chor Karlsruhe, Ralph Hammer (organ), Musica sacra – CD issued by the choir, 1999
- Barbara Kling, Ottilia Cappella, Himmelswege - Lieder vom Leben und von der Liebe – CD: EOS LC 28574, 2019

== Sources ==
- August Göllerich, Anton Bruckner. Ein Lebens- und Schaffens-Bild, c. 1922 – posthumous edited by Max Auer by G. Bosse, Regensburg, 1932
- Anton Bruckner – Sämtliche Werke, Band XXI: Kleine Kirchenmusikwerke, Musikwissenschaftlicher Verlag der Internationalen Bruckner-Gesellschaft, Hans Bauernfeind and Leopold Nowak (Editor), Vienna, 1984/2001
- Max Auer, Anton Bruckner. Sein Leben und Werk. Amalthea-Verlag, Vienna, c. 1950
- Robert Haas, Anton Bruckner, 2nd print (Reprint der Ausgabe Athenaion, Potsdam, 1934), Laaber Verlag, Regensburg, 1980. ISBN 3-9215-1841-5
- Hansjürgen Schäfer, Anton Bruckner. Ein Führer durch Leben und Werk. Henschel Verlag, Berlin, 1996. ISBN 3-7618-1590-5
- Uwe Harten, Anton Bruckner. Ein Handbuch. Residenz Verlag, Salzburg, 1996. ISBN 3-7017-1030-9.
- Keith William Kinder, The Wind and Wind-Chorus Music of Anton Bruckner, Greenwood Press, Westport CT, 2000. ISBN 0-313-30834-9.
- John Williamson, The Cambridge Companion to Bruckner, Cambridge University Press, Cambridge, 2004. ISBN 0-521-80404-3
- Cornelis van Zwol, Anton Bruckner - Leven en Werken, Uit. Thot, Bussum, NL, 2012. ISBN 978-90-6868-590-9
- Crawford Howie, Anton Bruckner - A documentary biography, online revised edition
