= Mass No. 2 =

Mass No. 2 may refer to:

- Mass No. 2 (Bruckner), in E minor, by Anton Bruckner
- Mass No. 2 (Haydn), Missa brevis in F major, by Joseph Haydn
- Mass No. 2 (Mozart), Waisenhaus in C minor, by Wolfgang Amadeus Mozart
- Mass No. 2 (Schubert), in G major, by Franz Schubert
