= Mass in G major =

Mass in G major may refer to:

- Mass in G major, K. 49 (Mozart)
- Mass in G major, K. 140 "Pastoral" (Mozart)
- Mass No. 2 (Schubert)
- Mass in G major (Poulenc)
- Mass in D (Smyth)
