= Mass No. 5 =

Mass No. 5 may refer to:

- Mass No. 5 (Mozart), Pastoral in G major, by Wolfgang Amadeus Mozart
- Mass No. 5 (Schubert), in A-flat major, by Franz Schubert
