= Vlkava =

- Municipality
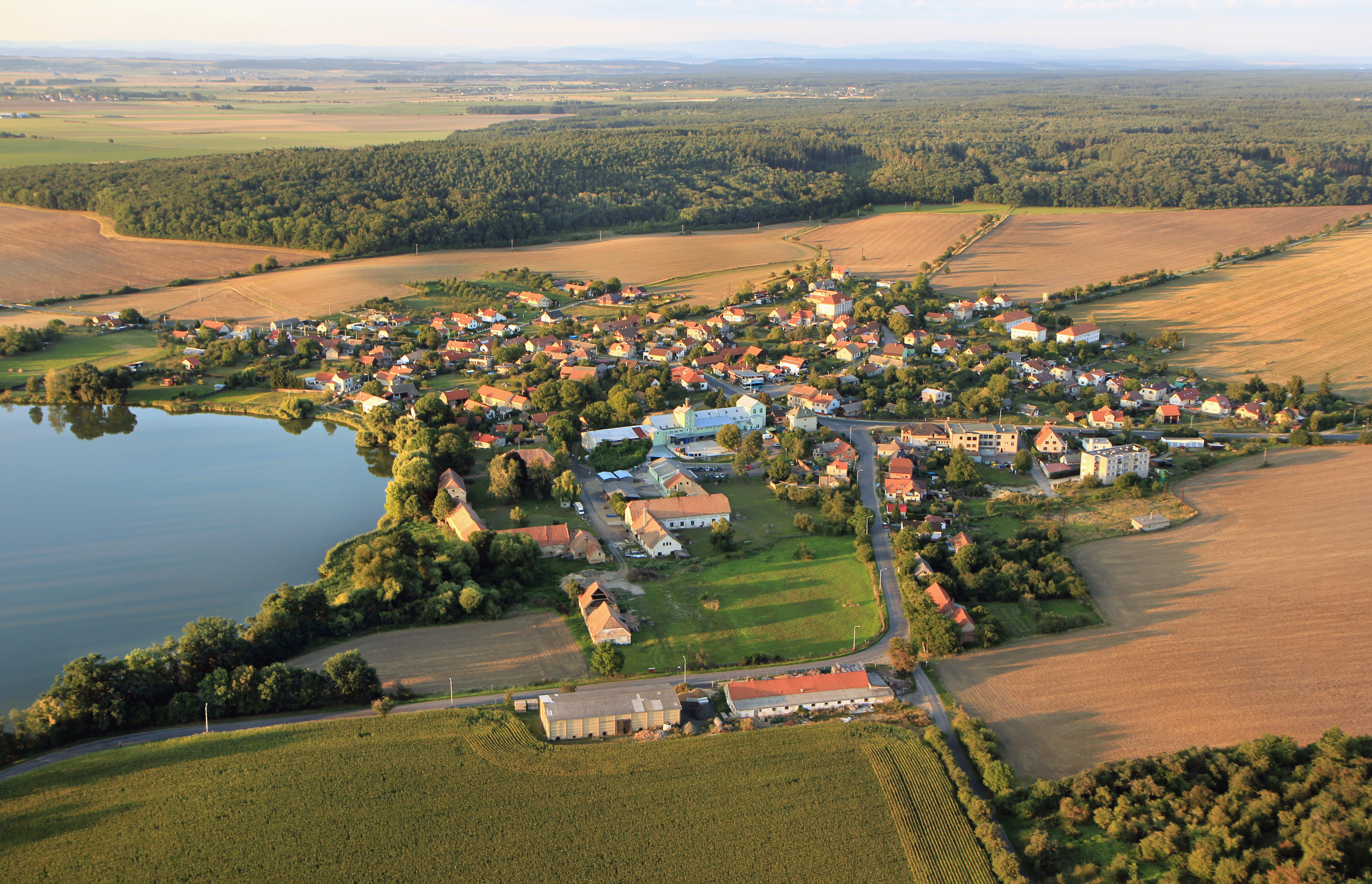
- Aerial view

- Location in the Czech Republic
- Coordinates: 50°16′17″N 14°57′41″E
- Country: Czech Republic
- Region: Central Bohemian
- District: Mladá Boleslav
- First mentioned: 1046

Area
  - Total: 7.74 km^{2} (2.99 sq mi)
- Elevation: 205 m (673 ft)

Population (2026-01-01)
  - Total: 493
  - Density: 63.7/km^{2} (165/sq mi)
- Time zone: UTC+1 (CET)
  - Summer (DST): UTC+2 (CEST)
- Postal code: 294 43
- Website: www.obec-vlkava.cz

Vlkava is a municipality and village in Mladá Boleslav District in the Central Bohemian Region of the Czech Republic. It has about 500 inhabitants.

== Administrative division ==
Vlkava consists of two municipal parts (in brackets population according to the 2021 census):

- Vlkava (418)
- Bor (11)

== Etymology ==
The village probably got its name from the Vlkava watercourse.

== Geography ==
Vlkava is located about 16 kilometres (10 mi) south of Mladá Boleslav and 35 km (22 mi) northeast of Prague. It lies in the Jizera Table. The highest point is at 262 m (860 ft) above sea level. The Vlkava River flows through the municipality. The village is situated on the shore of the fishpond Vlkava.

== History ==
The first written mention of Vlkava is from 1046. A medieval wooden fortress was first documented in 1415. After 1601, the fortress was replaced by a small castle. The most notable owners of Vlkava were the Harrach family. They owned the village from 1636 to 1789 and they had built here a new Baroque castle. However, this castle was burned down in 1873.

== Demographics ==
Historical population

Year	Pop.	±%
1869	514	—
1880	629	+22.4%
1890	661	+5.1%
1900	594	−10.1%
1910	602	+1.3%

Year	Pop.	±%
1921	599	−0.5%
1930	636	+6.2%
1950	481	−24.4%
1961	495	+2.9%
1970	513	+3.6%

Year	Pop.	±%
1980	444	−13.5%
1991	382	−14.0%
2001	389	+1.8%
2011	440	+13.1%
2021	429	−2.5%

Source: Censuses

== Transport ==
The I/38 road (the section Mladá Boleslav–Nymburk) runs through the municipality.

== Sights ==
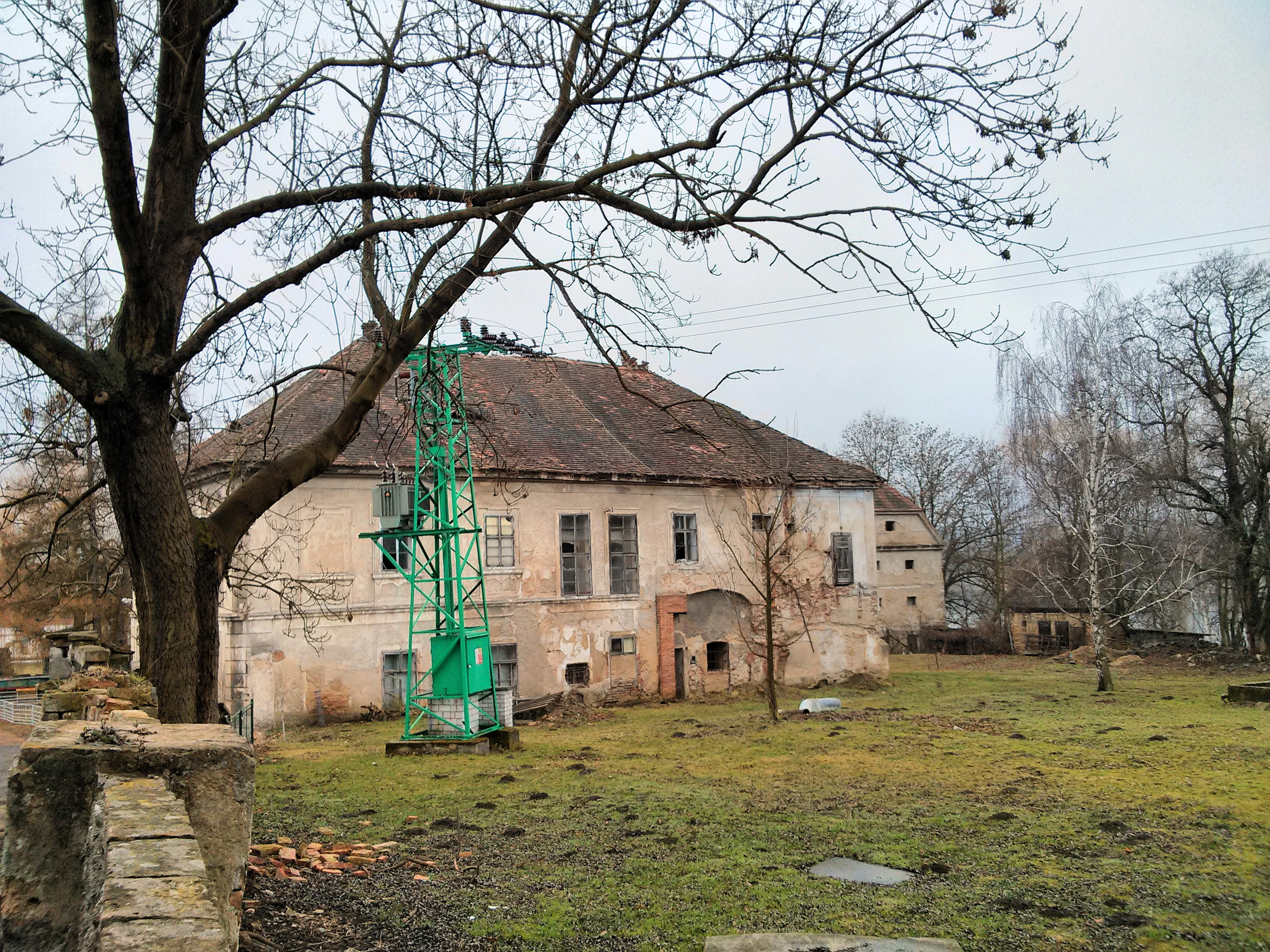
Vlkava Castle

The most valuable building is the Vlkava Castle. It is a small Baroque rural castle from the 17th century. The building is unused and falling into disrepair.

== Notable people ==
- Šimon Brixi (1693–1735), composer
