= Missa aulica =

- Missa brevis by František Xaver Brixi
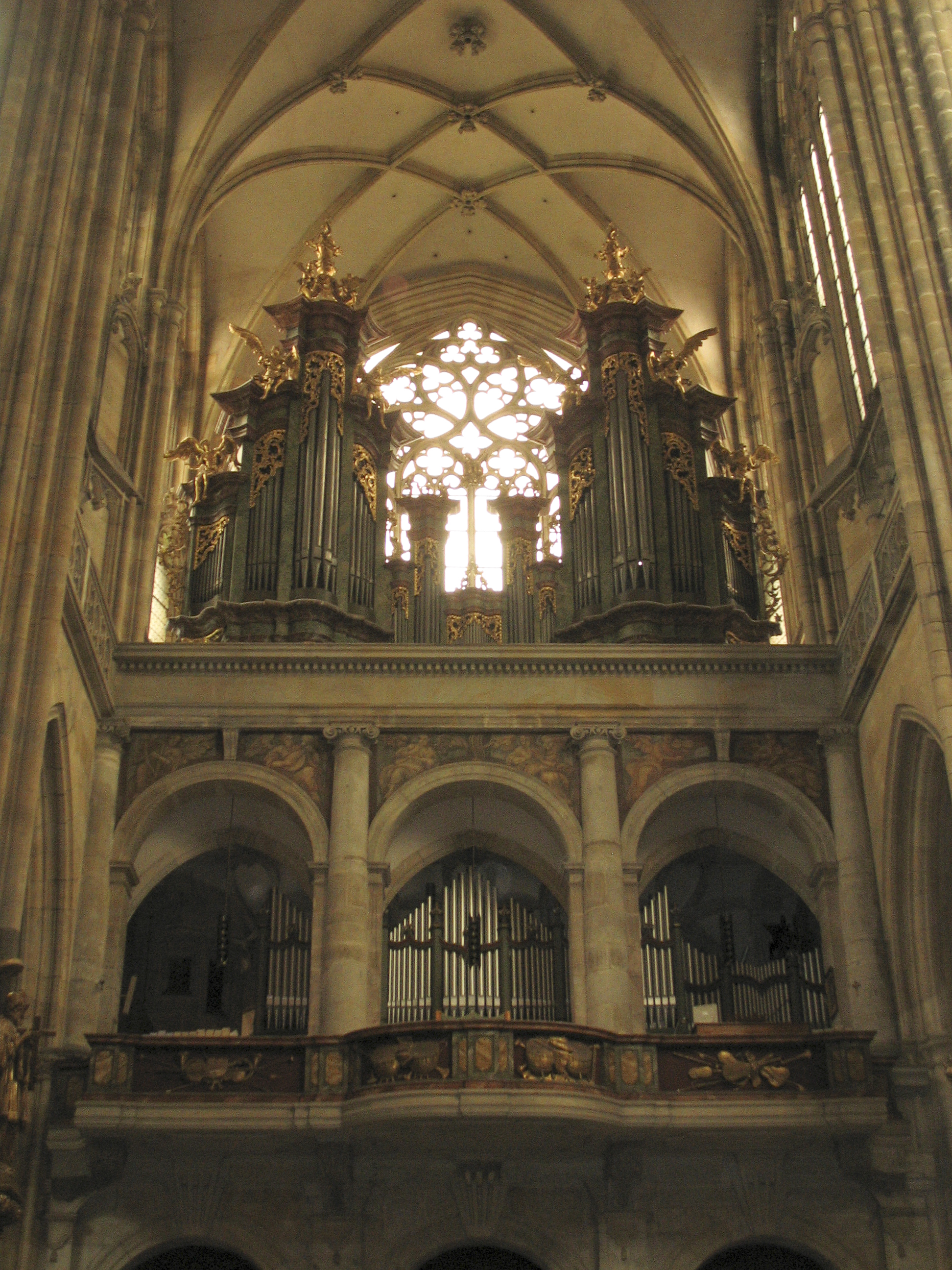
- The organ loft in the St. Vitus Cathedral in Prague, where the composer was choir director
- Key: C major
- Period: Classical period
- Text: Order of Mass
- Language: Latin
- Published: 2003
- Vocal: SATB choir
- Instrumental: orchestra

The Missa aulica (Court mass) is a missa brevis in C major composed by František Xaver Brixi. The work is a setting of the Latin mass for SATB soloists and choir, trumpets, timpani, violins, organ and continuo. It was published by Carus in 2003.

== History ==
František Xaver Brixi, or Franz Xaver Brixi, became Regens chori (choir director) of Prague's St. Vitus Cathedral in 1759 at age 27 and held the position unto his death in 1771. He was a prolific composer of music for the liturgy, who wrote more than 100 masses, vespers and motets, among others. He also composed secular music such as oratorios and incidental music, concertos and symphonies.

He composed the Missa brevis in C, a setting of the Latin order of Mass, for SATB soloists and choir, 2 trumpets, timpani, 2 violins, organ and continuo. The duration is given as 25 minutes. Karlheinz Ostermann, the editor of the first edition notes its "cantilena" solo melodies, simple themes for the choir, short fugal passages, and its optimistic mood.

Some sources have the name as Missa aulica (Court mass), which is also applied to Mozart's Missa solemnis in C, K. 337.

The mass was first published by Carus in 2003.
