= Missa brevis in C (Brixi) =

Mass by František Xaver Brixi

- by František Xaver Brixi
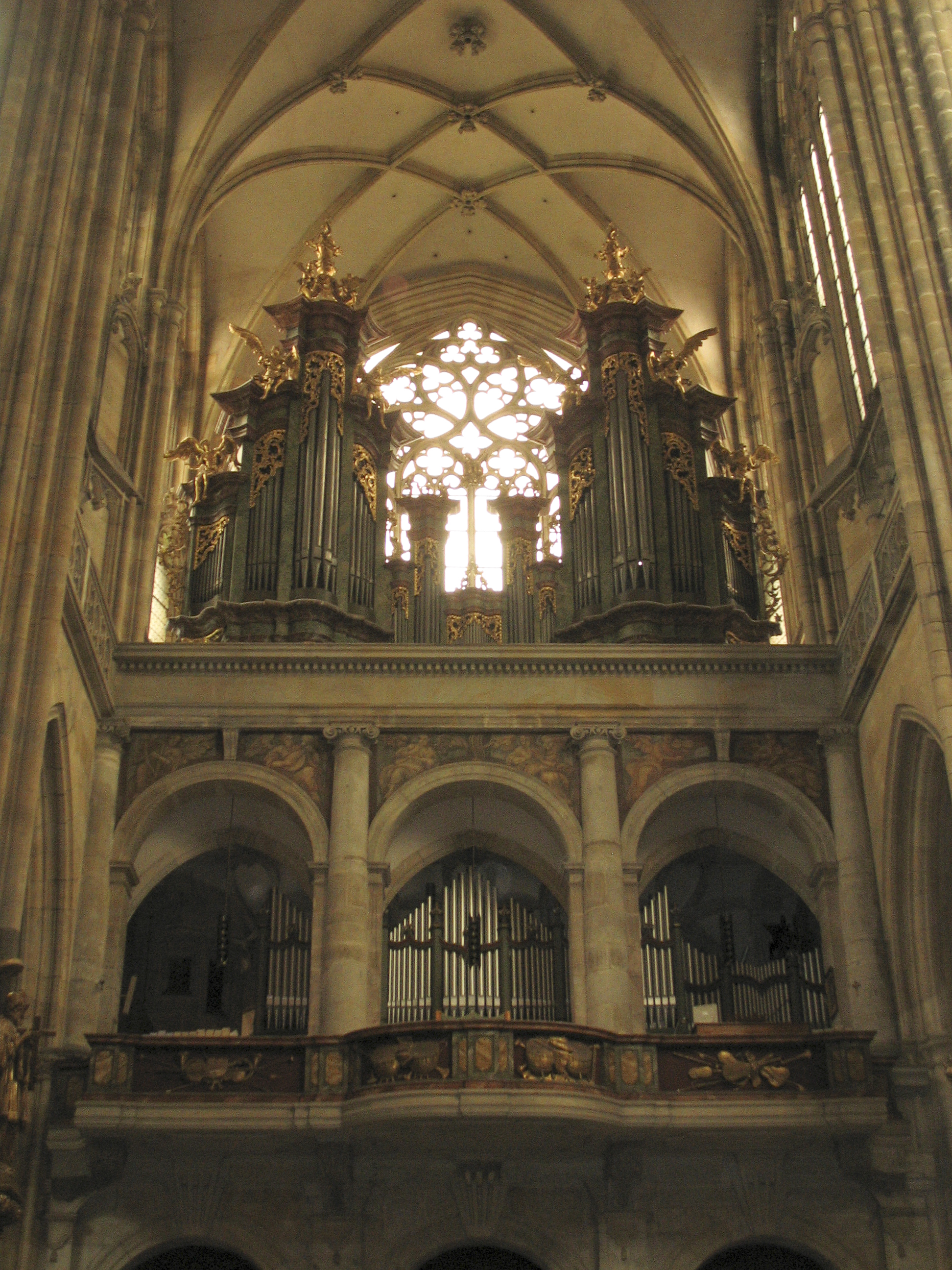
- The organ loft in the St. Vitus Cathedral in Prague, where the composer was choir director
- Key: C major
- Period: Classical period
- Text: Order of Mass
- Language: Latin
- Published: 2004
- Vocal: SATB soloists and choir
- Instrumental: trumpets; timpani; strings; organ

The Missa brevis in C is a composition by František Xaver Brixi. The missa brevis (short mass) is a setting of the Tridentine Mass for SATB soloists and choir, trumpets, timpani, strings and organ. Manuscripts were held in several monasteries in today's Czech Republic, Austria and Germany. It was published by Dr. J. Butz in 2004.

== History ==
František Xaver Brixi became regens chori (choir director) and kapellmeister of Prague's St. Vitus Cathedral in 1759 at age 27 and held the position until his death in 1771. He was a prolific composer of music for the liturgy, who wrote more than 100 masses, vespers and motets, among others. He also composed secular music such as oratorios and incidental music, concertos and symphonies.

He composed the Missa brevis in C, a setting of the Latin order of Mass, for SATB soloists and choir, trumpets, timpani, strings and organ. The duration is given as 13 minutes.

The mass was often copied, indicating that it was widely distributed. Five extant manuscripts have been found, three in today's Czech Republic, including Sedlec Abbey in Kutná Hora, in Litoměřice and Prague, in Austria in the Kremsmünster Abbey, and in Germany in the Ottobeuren Abbey. Some of the copies indicate the timpani, or the trumpets also, as optional. The mass was first published by Dr. J. Butz in 2004, edited by Friedrich Hägele. It has been described as marked by a balanced mix of homophony and polyphony, with cantabile solos. It is short enough for use in church services, and recommended as an alternative to other works from the classical period.
