= Asperges me, WAB 4 =

1844 motet composed by Anton Bruckner

Asperges me
- Motet by Anton Bruckner
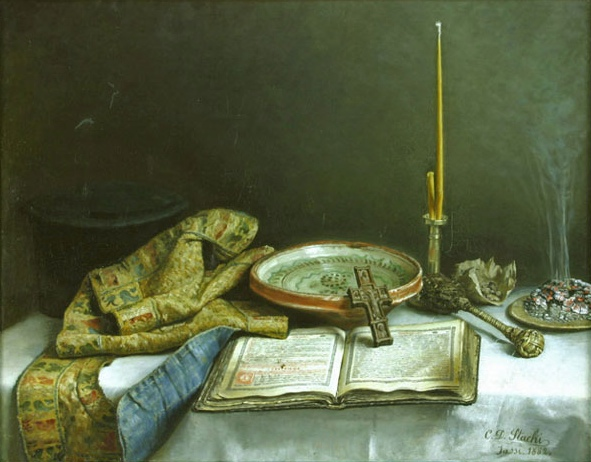
- Apă sfințită by Constantin Daniel Stahi
- Key: F major
- Catalogue: WAB 4
- Form: Antiphon
- Text: Asperges me
- Language: Latin
- Composed: 1843/1844: Kronstorf
- Dedication: Celebration of Asperges
- Published: 1932: Regensburg
- Vocal: SATB choir

Asperges me (Thou wilt sprinkle me), WAB 4, is a sacred motet composed by Anton Bruckner. It is a setting of the Latin Asperges me, the antiphon used for the celebration of Asperges.

== History ==
In 1843–44, Bruckner composed this first setting of Asperges me during his stay in Kronstorf. It is not known when it was performed at that time.

The work, the original manuscript of which is lost, exists as a transcription by Arthur Bauer. The motet was first published in volume III/2, pp. 140–141 of the Göllerich/Auer biography. It is put in volume XXI/4 of the Gesamtausgabe.

== Music ==
The work is a setting of 32 bars in F major of the Asperges me for mixed choir a cappella.

According to the Catholic practice, the incipit ("Asperges me") is not composed and has to be intoned by the priest in Gregorian mode before the choir begins. The score is in two sections. Section 1 (7 bars) begins with "Domine, hysopo" and ends with "dealbabor". Section 2 (18 bars) begins with the remaining of the text, and is followed by the doxology ("Gloria Patri"). Thereafter the incipit is repeated by the choir in unison, concluded by a da capo of section 1. The second section contains audacious modulations, similar to the contemporaneous Kronstorfer Messe.

== Discography ==
There is a single commercial recording of Bruckner's first Asperges me:

- Philipp von Steinäcker, Vocalensemble Musica Saeculorum, Bruckner: Pange lingua - Motetten - CD: Fra Bernardo FB 1501271, 2015

== Sources ==
- August Göllerich, Anton Bruckner. Ein Lebens- und Schaffens-Bild, c. 1922 – posthumous edited by Max Auer by G. Bosse, Regensburg, 1932
- Hansjürgen Schäfer, Anton Bruckner. Ein Führer durch Leben und Werk. Henschel Verlag, Berlin, 1996. ISBN 3-7618-1590-5
- Anton Bruckner – Sämtliche Werke, Band XXI: Kleine Kirchenmusikwerke, Musikwissenschaftlicher Verlag der Internationalen Bruckner-Gesellschaft, Hans Bauernfeind and Leopold Nowak (Editor), Vienna, 1984/2001
- Cornelis van Zwol, Anton Bruckner 1824–1896 – Leven en werken, uitg. Thoth, Bussum, Netherlands, 2012. ISBN 978-90-6868-590-9
- Uwe Harten, Anton Bruckner. Ein Handbuch. Residenz Verlag, Salzburg, 1996. ISBN 3-7017-1030-9.
