= Kronstorfer Messe =

1844 missa brevis composed by Anton Bruckner

- Mass by Anton Bruckner
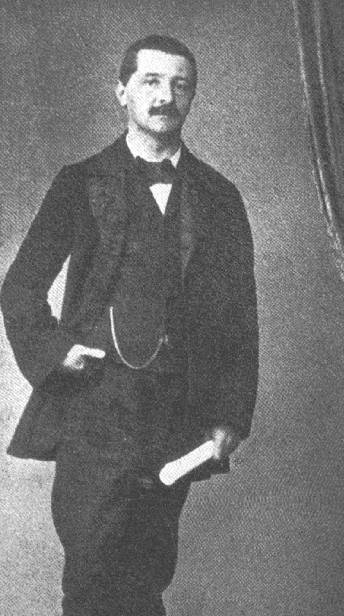
- The young Bruckner
- Key: D minor
- Catalogue: WAB 146
- Form: Missa brevis
- Composed: 1843 – 1844: Kronstorf
- Performed: 1 December 1974: St. Florian Monastery
- Published: 1984
- Recorded: 1998
- Movements: 4
- Vocal: SATB choir

The Kronstorfer Messe, WAB 146, is a missa brevis composed by Anton Bruckner in 1843-1844.

== History ==
Bruckner composed the Kronstorfer Messe, WAB 146, in 1843–1844, while he was a schoolteacher's assistant in Kronstorf. This Choral-Messe in D minor for mixed choir a cappella was presumably intended for the Lenten season.

The work, the manuscript of which was archived in the St. Florian Monastery, was premiered by Augustinus Franz Kropfreiter on 1 December 1974 in the church of the monastery. The work is put in Band XXI/41 of the Gesamtausgabe.

== Setting ==
The work is divided into four parts:

1. Kyrie - Adagio, D minor
2. Sanctus - Adagio, B-flat major
3. Benedictus - Andante, F major
4. Agnus Dei - Adagio, F major

Total duration: about 5 minutes.

This Missa brevis, also called Messe ohne Gloria [und Credo], exhibits relationships to Palestrina's style. The mass survives only in a fragmentary state, without Credo. The manuscript, with, on the front page, an autograph indication "Sine Gloria", contains two blank pages with an autograph indication that they were to contain a Credo in F major.

Alike the contemporaneous Asperges me in F major (WAB 4), the Agnus Dei in F major contains audacious modulations.

=== Note ===
The Sanctus is re-used in a slightly modified setting for that of the next Messe für den Gründonnerstag.

== Discography ==
There are two recordings of the Mass:

- Jussi Kauranen, Pirkanpojat boys' choir, Tampere (Finland), Tuhansin Kielin – CD PPCD 02, edited by the choir, 1998
- Sigvards Klava, Latvian Radio Choir, Bruckner: Latin Motets – CD Ondine OD 1362, 2019

== Sources ==
- Anton Bruckner – Sämtliche Werke, Band XXI: Kleine Kirchenmusikwerke, Musikwissenschaftlicher Verlag der Internationalen Bruckner-Gesellschaft, Hans Bauernfeind and Leopold Nowak (Editor), Vienna, 1984/2001
- Uwe Harten, Anton Bruckner. Ein Handbuch. Residenz Verlag, Salzburg, 1996. ISBN 3-7017-1030-9.
- James Garrat, Palestrina and the German Romantic Imagination, Cambridge University Press, Cambridge, 2004. ISBN 0-521-80737-9
- John Williamson, The Cambridge Companion to Bruckner, Cambridge University Press, Cambridge, 2004. ISBN 0-521-80404-3
- Cornelis van Zwol, Anton Bruckner – Leven en Werken, Uit. Thot, Bussum, NL, 2012. ISBN 978-90-6868-590-9
