= A Cambridge Mass =

Choral work by Ralph Vaughan Williams

- Missa brevis by Ralph Vaughan Williams
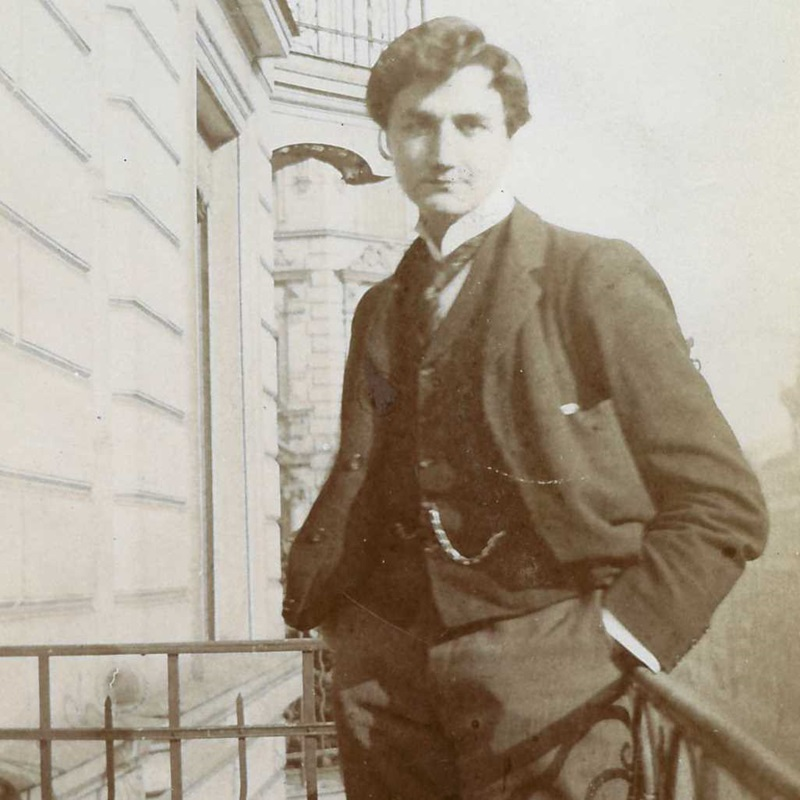
- Vaughan Williams in 1898
- Text: Credo and Sanctus from the Mass ordinary
- Language: Latin
- Composed: 1899
- Performed: 3 March 2011
- Movements: 5
- Scoring: four soloists; double choir; orchestra

A Cambridge Mass is a choral work in G major by Ralph Vaughan Williams written between 1898 and 1899 as part of his studies in Cambridge for his Doctorate of Music. It is one of two large scale choral works with orchestral accompaniment by Vaughan Williams surviving from this period, the other being a cantata setting of Swinburne's poem The Garden of Proserpine.

== History ==
=== Composition ===
Returning to Cambridge from a period in Berlin taking lessons from Max Bruch, Vaughan Williams was set the task of composing a large scale (40-60 minute) choral/orchestral work containing the following:

1. Sections for one or more soloists along with major portions for an eight voice choir;
2. Examples of both canons and fugues;
3. An orchestral section in sonata form, either as an overture or intermezzo; and
4. A single section for voice(s) alone, the rest being with full orchestral accompaniment.

Vaughan Williams responded with a concert setting of the Credo and Sanctus of the mass in a quasi-symphonic structure with two choral movements with orchestral accompaniment flanking a central movement for orchestra alone. It is not known why Vaughan Williams did not set the complete mass. McClarney in his thesis speculates that it may have either been due to time constraints or personality clashes with his teacher Stanford, citing a letter to Holst in which the composer talks both of a lack of sleep due to time spent writing out the score and of a disagreement with Stanford over the structure of the completed composition.

=== Rediscovery ===
After being submitted for Vaughan Williams' doctorate, the mass was stored in the university archives until it was put on display in 2007, where it was noticed by conductor Alan Tongue, who recognized its potential significance and obtained permission from the Vaughan Williams Charitable Trust for a performing version to be made from the manuscript score.

=== Performance history ===
The first performance of the mass took place on 3 March 2011 at the Fairfield Halls in Croydon. Subsequent performances have taken place in Bath and in the United States at Smith College, Northampton.

=== Recording ===
In October 2014, Albion Records released a recording of the premiere performance of the Mass.

== Movements ==
The composition is a missa brevis for orchestra, double choir and four soloists, and is divided into three movements:

1. Credo: Andante Maestoso - Adagio molto - Allegro moderato - Allegro
2. Offertorium: Allegro moderato
3. Finale (Sanctus - Benedictus - Hosanna): Adagio - Allegro - Andante sostenuto - Allegro
