= Christopher Wood (composer) =

Welsh composer

Professor Christopher Wood (born 1945) is a Welsh-born composer of sacred choral music, best known for his setting of the Requiem Mass (The Wood Requiem), his Missa Brevis, the 'Easter Oratorio Holy Week and the string orchestra piece Aberfan, commissioned for the Last Night of the Welsh Proms in 2016.

Wood's five-movement Missa Brevis, for choir and organ, was first performed at the sung Eucharist at St Paul's Cathedral, London on 3 August 2014. It is adapted from the Wood Requiem - a larger work for soloists, choir and orchestra, which was first performed at St John's Smith Square, London in December 2012, by L'Inviti Singers conducted by Paul Brough, Principal Guest Conductor of the BBC Singers.

Wood was one of the speakers at the Royal College of Organists' recital and reception held at Mansion House, London in September 2013 to mark the beginning of the celebration of the RCO's 150th anniversary. In 2014, Wood was appointed Chairman of Trustees of the Royal College of Organists. In July 2015, Wood was awarded an Honorary Fellowship from the University of Wales Trinity Saint David for services to medicine and music.

Wood's Easter Oratorio Holy Week, was recorded at Abbey Road Studios, London in November 2015.

On 23 July 2016, Wood's work for string orchestra, Aberfan, commissioned by the Welsh Proms, was performed by the Royal Philharmonic Orchestra, directed by Owain Arwel Hughes, at the Last Night of the Welsh Proms. On 22 August 2017, Aberfan received its first radio broadcast on Classic FM as part of the Full Works Concert with Jane Jones. The piece was transcribed for brass in 2018, and this version was premiered at the Welsh Proms, in the national concert hall of Wales, St David's Hall, Cardiff on Wednesday July 25, 2018. The performance featured the massed bands of Lewis Merthyr & RAF St Athan, conducted by Owain Arwel Hughes CBE. The transcription for brass was also recorded on the album Brass & Voices of Wales by the Lewis Merthyr Band, conducted by Owain Arwel Hughes. The string version has also been recorded.
