= Missa Brevis (Bernstein) =

Leonard Bernstein's last complete choral work

- Missa brevis by Leonard Bernstein
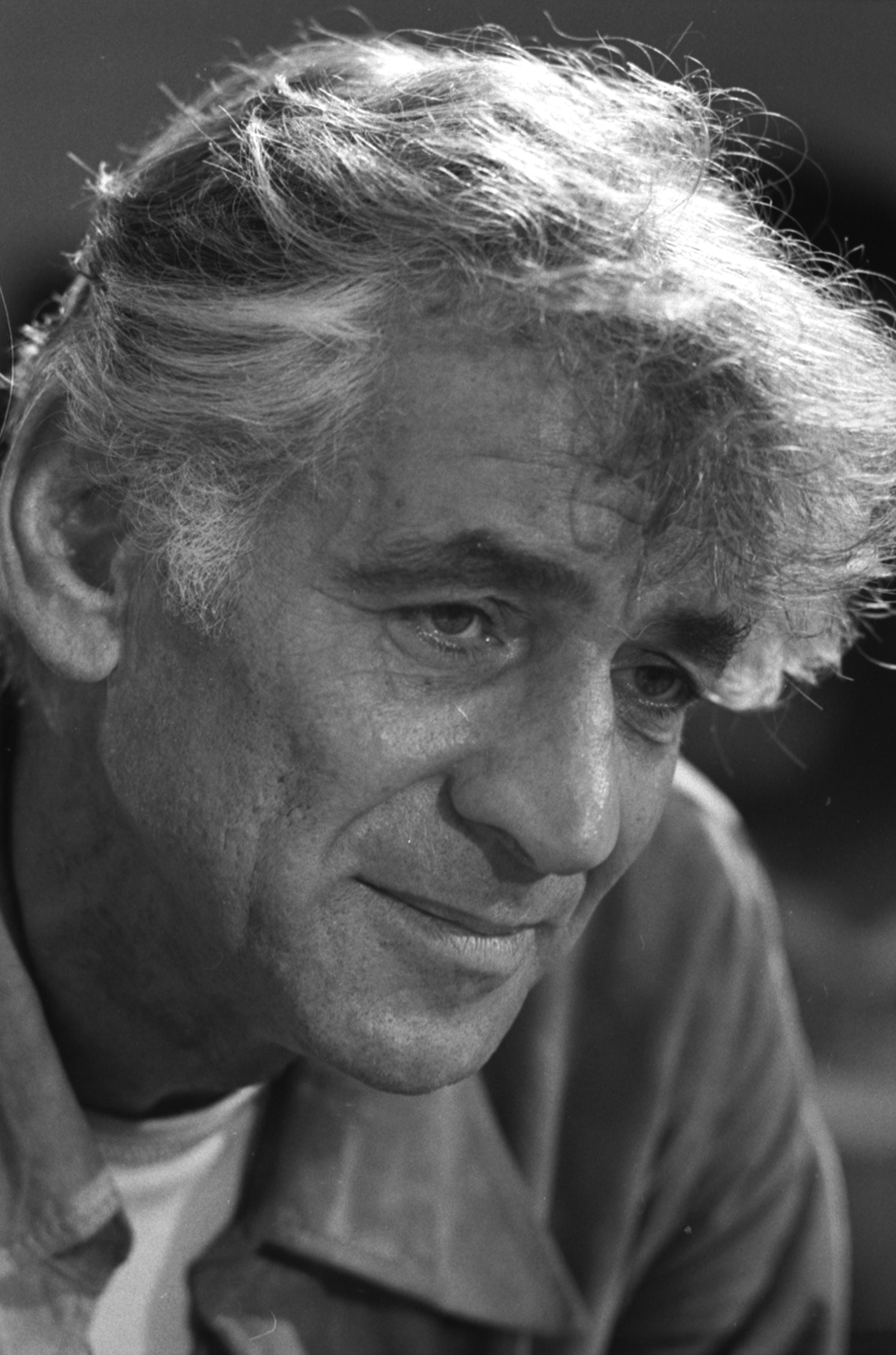
- The composer in 1971
- Related: based on incidental music for Anouilh's play The Lark
- Occasion: retirement of Robert Shaw from the Atlanta Symphony Orchestra
- Text: Missa senza credo
- Language: Latin
- Composed: 1988
- Performed: 1989: Atlanta
- Movements: six
- Scoring: countertenor; mixed choir; percussion

The Missa Brevis by Leonard Bernstein is a musical setting of parts of the mass ordinary in Latin for a mixed a cappella choir with countertenor solo and percussion. It is also Bernstein's last complete choral work, due to his death a year after its completion in 1989.

== Overview ==
The origin of the piece lies in the incidental choral music that Bernstein composed for an adaptation of Jean Anouilh's play The Lark, directed by Lillian Hellman in 1955. The play's plot covers the events surrounding Joan of Arc and her trial. This led Bernstein to compose the choral music to sound medieval to early Renaissance in quality and texture to suit the play's atmosphere.

Robert Shaw, conductor of the Atlanta Symphony Orchestra, came to watch one of the first performances of the play. After the show, Shaw approached Bernstein and suggested that the incidental chorus music be adapted into a unified choral piece to produce a compelling missa brevis. Thirty-three years later, Bernstein followed Shaw's suggestion and completed Missa Brevis in honor of Shaw's retirement as music director of the Atlanta Symphony Orchestra in 1988. Shaw later premiered and recorded the work with the Atlanta Symphony Chorus.

Structurally, Missa Brevis incorporates four of the traditional five sections of the Ordinary, plus two extra sections added, "Benedictus" and "Dona Nobis Pacem". Bernstein chose to omit the Credo ("I believe in one God") section; the reason for this omission is unknown.

In this first recording of the piece, certain passages of the liturgical text from the Gloria and Agnus Dei were not performed. These passages were later added for the score's publication by Bernstein with the assistance of George Steel.

Bernstein's Missa Brevis is still performed frequently. Its length makes it suitable to be used in a liturgical setting, and it is substantial enough to be used as a set piece in concert.

== Scoring ==
The work is scored primarily for mixed a cappella chorus. Most of the percussion parts are optional, except for two sets of bells or chimes, to be placed on either side of the chorus. Several of the movements call for a countertenor soloist. The directions state that it may also be performed by a boy alto or even a female alto (unlike his Chichester Psalms, which prohibits all female soloists)

Performances of the revised version take about 11½ minutes; Shaw's recording of the original version runs about 9½ minutes.

== Movements ==
=== 1. Kyrie ===
Written in the key of C, with extensions beyond functional harmony, this movement lasts only thirteen measures. While most settings of the "Kyrie" focus on the word "eleison" ("have mercy"), Bernstein focuses, through repetition and elongation, on the word "Kyrie" ("Lord"). The focus on the word "Kyrie" creates a percussive quality in the movement as each "k" is sounded. According to Bernstein's markings, the movement should slowly crescendo, until reaching a forte at measure eight, and then diminuendo towards a half cadence that goes into the next movement. Bernstein’s focus on the word "Kyrie", combined with the slow but drastic dynamic contrast, creates a sense of intense pleading.

=== 2. Gloria ===
Most of the material from this movement is directly derived from the chorus in The Lark titled Gloria. It is however lengthened in the published score of Missa Brevis to fit the additional text of "Laudate dominum".

Although the movement tonally centers on A, Bernstein’s frequent placement of non-resolving non-harmonic tones creates ambiguity in the tonality. The first eleven measures fluctuate between A major and A minor before settling to a sort of E minor in measure twelve. This serves as an introduction to the countertenor soloist.

The next twenty-five measures set the text "laudamus te". Here, Bernstein modulates from E minor to E major, taking the movement into the text "gratias", which keeps shifting between C major and F major for roughly fourteen measures. Settling in C minor, Bernstein starts "Domine deus", the longest portion of text in the movement. He continues into "quoniam" and finishes the movement in C minor with bells playing fortissimo.

Bernstein lays out the instructions for the bell playing as follows:

There are two sets of bells, one in each wing or on each side of the chorus, each having at least three different notes (any notes at all, but preferably covering a wide range). The notes should be sounded one at a time at the most rapid possible tempo."

The harmonic language in this movement has been described as a blend of medieval and Renaissance styles with the musical styles of mid-twentieth century America. The music has also been described as containing "vital rhythms" and "pungent harmonies" — a good general description of Missa Brevis as a whole.

Gloria is not only the longest movement in Missa Brevis, but also the most difficult to sing. The movement demands perfect tuning with straight tone singing, all while maintaining a high tessitura for the sopranos, tenors, and basses. Like all other movements of Missa Brevis, Gloria is completely a cappella apart from the percussion, which provides little help in terms of pitch for the singers, who are often singing added non-chord tones. A combination of these factors can make it challenging to keep good intonation throughout the movement.

=== 3. Sanctus ===
Bernstein employs several modes in Sanctus, an engrossing movement in terms of tonality. Much of it shifts between G major and a sort of dorian mode set in G. The countertenor solo is a main feature in this movement. After the first four measures, marked misterioso and piano, Bernstein creates what is reminiscent of an organum. With each part in the choir sustaining a drone on the pitches of G and D, the countertenor soloist freely sings a mixolydian chant starting with "Deus, Deus Sabaoth".

The shifting of homophonic yet discant-like use of harmony followed by drones with florid melodic activity further perpetuates a medieval quality. Bernstein effectively creates an aesthetic reminiscent of music from the 14th century.

=== 4. Benedictus ===
Although beginning a new set of text, Benedictus is a continuation of Sanctus. This semi-movement proceeds to use the same structural format laid out in Sanctus. Much of it involves the countertenor soloist performing a chant-like recitative followed by a choral response on the text "osanna in excelsis".

The dynamics could be described as explosively contrasting. The use of crescendo in this part of the work is quite extensive and there is frequent movement between forte and piano.

=== 5. Agnus Dei ===
Bernstein leads the opening material from Gloria into the start of Agnus Dei. The opening chords are almost exactly the same. It tonally ventures from A major and A minor to F♯ minor at the repetition found on measure 15. By measure 30, Bernstein dabs into the implementation of F♯ major to finish on the text "qui tollis peccata mundi" ("who takes away the sins of the world").

=== 6. Dona Nobis Pacem ===
A continuation of Agnus Dei, Dona Nobis Pacem starts as the previous section of the movement settles from F♯ major into a fluctuation of A major and A minor. The result lands the tonal center back to C major at measure 11. It is here that Bernstein starts to use a six-note stepwise scale starting on C as the basis for melodic material.

Rhythmically, this final section of Missa Brevis is very dance-like. It employs triple meter and although not notated as such, appears to shift between 3/4 and 6/8. The percussion is also instructed to improvise its part, making each performance of the piece unique in timbre and texture.

== Recordings ==
Unlike many of Bernstein's works, Missa Brevis is one that the composer never performed or recorded; he died a year after its completion. The work was first recorded in 1989 by the Atlanta Symphony Chorus under the direction of Robert Shaw on a CD that also contains performances of Bernstein's Chichester Psalms and Walton’s Belshazzar’s Feast, in its original form and without the later added text in the Gloria.

The first recording of the revised work was made by the BBC Symphony Orchestra and Chorus and the BBC Singers under the direction of Leonard Slatkin in 2003.

Other recordings include those by the SWR Vokalensemble, conducted by Marcus Creed; Stephen Layton with Polyphony; and Marin Alsop with the São Paulo Symphony Orchestra.

== Reception ==
Missa Brevis has received some favorable reviews as a Bernstein composition. The work garners some attention as it is unique among Bernstein's choral works. The medieval and Renaissance blend in which Bernstein composed the work is not seen in his other works. The counterpoint in Missa Brevis has been described as excellent. It has been called a "compact jewel" by the American Record Guide. A review in Gramophone stated that the work’s particular ensemble requirement brings out the medieval overtones and gives the work a "modern tang".
