= Aurora (tone poem) =

Orchestral tone poem by William Lloyd Webber

Aurora is an orchestral tone poem by William Lloyd Webber which is acknowledged to be among the composer's finest works. Written in 1948 and performed once by a BBC orchestra conducted by Alexander Gibson it subsequently lay unperformed for many years. When a modern recording was issued in 1986 Edward Greenfield described the work as "...skillfully and sumptuously scored, its music as sensuous as any you will find from a British composer, it is not just a classically-inspired portrait of a Greek goddess but rather a surgingly emotional fantasy."

William Lloyd Webber himself had this to say in a programme note about Aurora:

"Arriving from the East in a chariot of winged horses, dispelling night and dispersing the dews of the morning. Aurora was the Roman Goddess of the dawn. This short tone poem attempts to portray in reasonably respectable sonata first movement form, the inherent sensuality of her nature.

Consecutive 6/4 chords introduce a bit of night music soon to be dispelled by the dawn theme, announced by the flute. Aurora's theme forms the second subject and (it is hoped) is of a suitably lyrical nature, as befits such a beautiful goddess. Her amorous adventures can possibly be imagined in the development section, and in the recapitulation her theme occurs twice – the first time with a light textured orchestration, and then with all the instruments that were available at the time of writing the piece.

At the moment of climax, the night music returns again, and Aurora has to leave us. However the final cadence has a hint of her theme, and there is always the promise of a new day."
