= Invocation (William Lloyd Webber album) =

Studio album by William Lloyd Webber
- Released: 1998
- Genre: classical
- Label: Chandos

Professional ratings
Review scores
Source	Rating
The Independent	*

Invocation is an album by composer William Lloyd Webber.

== Track listing ==
1. Aurora
2. Serenade for Strings
3. Invocation
4. Lento for Strings in E major
5. Three Spring Miniatures
6. Nocturne for Cello and Harp, Julian Lloyd Webber (Cello), Skaila Kanga (Harp)
7. Love Divine, All Loves Excelling, Westminster Singers
8. Benedictus for Violin and Organ, Tasmin Little (Violin), Ian Watson (Organ)
9. Mass "Princeps pacis", Westminster Singers
10. Jesus, Dear Jesus, conducted by Gareth Jones, Hollie Cook (Soprano), John Antrobus (Organ) and London Arts Educational School Choir.

Tracks 1,2,3,4,5,7,9 were conducted by Richard Hickox with the City of London Sinfonia.
