= Missa Princeps Pacis =

- Mass by William Lloyd Webber
- Text: Mass Ordinary
- Language: Latin
- Composed: 1962
- Dedication: Wilfred Purney
- Published: 1962: London
- Vocal: SATB choir
- Instrumental: Organ

The Missa Princeps Pacis (Mass Prince of Peace) is a mass composed by William Lloyd Webber in 1962 for a four-part choir and organ.

Lloyd Webber, who was the father of the composer Andrew Lloyd Webber and the cellist Julian Lloyd Webber, was the organist and choirmaster of All Saints, Margaret Street, London between 1939 and 1948. From 1958 he served as director of music at the Methodist Central Hall, Westminster. During this time, he composed two Latin masses, Princeps Pacis in 1962 and Missa Sanctae Mariae Magdalenae in 1979.

The title "Prince of Peace" was part of a prophecy by Isaiah (Isaiah 9:6), which Handel had used in the chorus For unto us a child is born in part I of his Messiah. The mass sets all part of the Mass Ordinary except the Credo, and is thus a missa brevis.

The mass was published in 1962 under the English title Mass "The Prince of Peace", with the dedication "to my friend Father Wilfred Purney with affection". It was recorded by Chandos in 1997, styled "Mass: 'Princeps Pacis'", as part of the album Invocation, a collection of works by William Lloyd Webber, with the Westminster Singers and organist Ian Watson and conducted by Richard Hickox.

It was published under its Latin title in the William Lloyd Webber Centenary Collection by Kevin Mayhew. It was included in a celebration of Lloyd Webber's sacred music at St Martin-in-the-Fields on 11 March 2014, marking his 100th anniversary. The St Martin-in-the-Fields event included St Martin's Voices and organist Andrew Earis. A reviewer noted: "The first half ended with possibly the finest of the chosen works, the choral Missa Princeps Pacis, a beautifully crafted and proportioned composition with echoes of Fauré, performed here with delicacy."

== Structure ==
Webber structured the text in five movements, which he marked for tempo in Italian:

- Kyrie – Comodo e cantabile / Poco agitato
- Gloria – Allegro comodo / Meno mosso ed espreso/ Allegro comodo
- Sanctus – Maestoso
- Benedictus – Andante sostenuto
- Agnus Dei = Comodo, ma poco mesto
