= Missa brevis (Haydn) =

1750 mass by Joseph Haydn

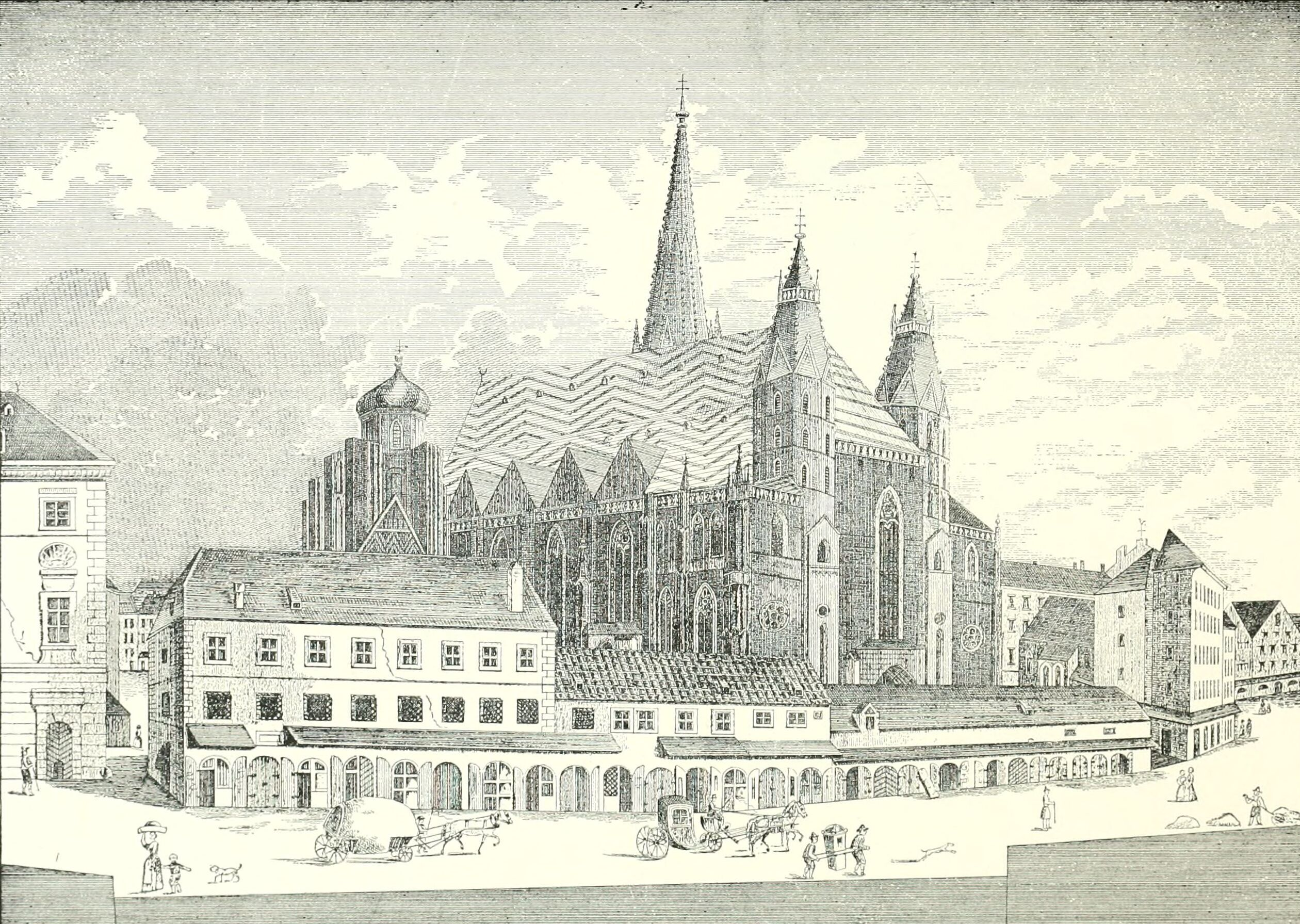
St. Stephen's Cathedral in Vienna, with the Kapellhaus (headquarters for the music director and his establishment) in the foreground. The Kapellhaus was Haydn's home when he served as a chorister at the cathedral and composed the Missa brevis. It was torn down in 1804, a year before the elderly Haydn re-encountered his early work.

The Missa brevis in F major, Hob. XXII:1, is a mass by Joseph Haydn originally completed in 1749. According to Dack it is Haydn's "earliest authenticated work." It also represents some of the last of his compositional activity, as in his old age he spent some time attempting to revise it.

== Composition ==
Dack (2009) suggests that Haydn originally composed the work when he was still a teenaged chorister at St. Stephen's Cathedral, singing under the direction of Georg Reutter. In its original form, the mass was scored for fairly rudimentary forces: two violin parts, continuo, a four-part chorus, and solo parts for two trebles. When the young Haydn, newly unemployed after being dismissed from the choir at St. Stephen's, made a pilgrimage to Mariazell, the Missa brevis was one of the works he showed the music director there.

The work is a clear example of the Austrian missa brevis form. Redlich writes of "the Austrian type of the Missa Brevis, notorious for the hurried expediency with which large tracts of the text of the Mass are musically disposed of. In the Creed the text from "Patrem omnipotentem" to "Et vitam venturi" is dealt with in no more than twenty-nine bars. This is managed by the simultaneous singing of different sentences—the profession of catholic faith, "Et unam sanctam catholicam ... ecclesiam", tucked away in the contralto." Redlich adds that, like similar instances of the missa brevis, Haydn repeats the music for the Kyrie in the final "Dona nobis pacem" section.

== Reception ==
The existence of various manuscript sources for the mass from the 18th century indicates that the Missa brevis spread by means of hand copying (the usual form of transmission of church music at the time), "leading its own independent life" (Jones).

== Rediscovery and revision ==
Haydn reencountered his mass in 1805. In the meantime, he had experienced an illustrious career, but after about 1802 illness had reduced him to an invalid, unable to compose. The copy of the mass that was brought to his attention was in the Servite monastery in the Viennese suburb of Rossau. Haydn recognized the work as his own and wrote on the organ part, "di me Giuseppe Haydn mpri 1749" ("by me, Joseph Haydn, in my own hand 1749").

Haydn's biographer Albert Christoph Dies recounted the story of how the mass was rediscovered in a chapter of his Haydn biography, based on an interview visit of 21 November 1805:

Chance brought into his hands a short time ago one of his youthful compositions that he had forgotten all about. This work is a four-voice short mass with two obbligato sopranos. The recovery of this child, lost fifty-two years before, gave the parent great joy. He examined it attentively, conducted an investigation, perceived it was not unworthy of him, and determined to dress it in modern clothes. "What specially pleases me in this little work," said Haydn, "is the melody, and certain youthful fire, and this stirs me to write down several measures a day in order to provide the voices with a wind-instrument accompaniment."

Because of his illness Haydn was unable to bring to fruition his effort to provide wind parts; however, some other composer, thought to be Joseph Heidenreich, did complete the full set (pairs of flutes, clarinets, bassoons, trumpets, and timpani) for the mass. The revised work went unpublished.

== Assessment ==
Dack writes, "This early work displays some blemishes of technique that Haydn, swayed by its 'youthful fire,' later ignored."
