= Šimon Brixi =

Czech composer (1693–1735)

- Born: 28 October 1693; Vlkava, Bohemia
- Died: 2 November 1735 (aged 42); Prague, Bohemia
- Children: František Brixi

Šimon Brixi (28 October 1693 – 2 November 1735) was a Czech composer and organist. He was the father of composer František Brixi.

== Life ==
Brixi was born on 28 October 1693 in Vlkava, Bohemia. From 1711 to 1717, he studied at the Jesuit college in Jičín. In 1724, he married Ludmila Barbora Fialková. Their son, František Brixi, also became a composer.

In 1720, Brixi began studying law in Prague but did not complete his studies, choosing instead to devote himself to music. His artistic activity was closely linked with the musical life in Prague. In 1725, he was dismissed from the Servite Order and became a burgher of the Old Town of Prague. In 1727, Brixi took up the position of teacher, organist and choirmaster at Church of St. Martin in the Wall in the Old Town of Prague, where he worked until his death. He died in Prague on 2 November 1735, aged 42. He is buried at the Church of St. Martin in the Wall.

== Style and work ==
Brixi is one of the most prominent representatives of the Czech Baroque music. He mastered all the techniques and styles of his time. His compositions were intended almost exclusively for a church choir. About 40 of his compositions have been preserved (but for some the authorship is questionable). He wrote offertoria, gradualia, Regina Coeli, Salve Reginas, requiems, litanies, Te Deums, and church cantatas. In some of his works, Brixi also thematically elaborated folk spiritual music. He was also interested in Italian Baroque music; some of his copies of Neapolitan church compositions are preserved in the church archive at Mělník. Brixi was also influenced by the church compositions of Jan Dismas Zelenka. He composed his works both on Czech and Latin texts.
