= František Brixi =

Czech composer (1732–1771)

- Born: 2 January 1732; Prague, Kingdom of Bohemia
- Died: 14 October 1771 (aged 39); Prague, Kingdom of Bohemia
- Occupation: Classical composer
- Father: Šimon Brixi

František Xaver Brixi (German: Franz Xaver Brixi; 2 January 1732 – 14 October 1771) was a Czech classical composer. He was the son of composer Šimon Brixi.

== Life ==
Brixi was born on 2 January 1732 in Prague, the son of composer Šimon Brixi. He received his musical education at the Piarist gymnasium in Kosmonosy. His teachers included Václav Kalous, a significant composer himself.

In 1749, Brixi left Kosmonosy and returned to Prague, where he worked as an organist at several churches. In 1759, he was appointed regens chori (choir director) and Kapellmeister of St. Vitus Cathedral, thus attaining, at age 27, the highest musical position in the city; (Note: In the second half of the 18th century, the ensemble at St. Vitus Cathedral consisted of nine secular choralists, nine psalm-singing priests, 32 permanent musicians and six bonifants.) this office he held till his early death. He wrote some 290 church works (of the most varied type), cantatas and oratorios, chamber compositions, and orchestral compositions. He was a prolific composer of music for the liturgy, and wrote more than 100 masses, vespers and motets, among others. He also composed secular music such as oratorios and incidental music, concertos and symphonies. His organ concertos, which have been recorded several times each, are his best-known pieces today.

Brixi died of tuberculosis in Prague in 1771, at the age of 39.

== Style and influence ==
Brixi was an important composer at the junction between the Baroque and Classical periods. Brixi's style is distinguished from that of his contemporaries by its fresh melodic writing, vivacious rhythm and lively bass lines, and from that of his predecessors by its simple yet effective instrumentation.

Brixi's music made Prague's people receptive for Mozart's music (where Mozart was in high esteem even during times where he was shunned elsewhere).

== Compositions ==
Brixi composed 500 works, in which sacred music dominated. None of his compositions were published during Brixi's lifetime.

- Missa di Gloria in D major (c.1758)
- Missa integra in D minor
- Missa brevis in C major for soloists, choir orchestra and organ
- Missa aulica in C major
- Missa pastoralis in C major
- Missa pastoralis in D major
- Missa solemnis in D major for soloists, choir, orchestra and organ
- Missa Dominicalis in C major
- 8 Organ Concertos
- Viola Concerto in C major
- Sinfonia in D major
- Oratorio Opus patheticum de septem doloribus Beatae Mariae Virginis
- Oratorio Crux morientis Jesu Christi
- Oratorio Filius Prodigus (Osek 1755)
- Oratorio Judas Iscariothes – Oratorium pro die sacro Parasceves (Osek c.1770)
- Litanie de seto Benedieto
- Confiteor tibi Domine
- Bitevní sinfonie
- Fuga in A minor
- Pastoral in C major
- Preludium In C major
- Regina coeli
