= Windhaag bei Freistadt =

- Municipality
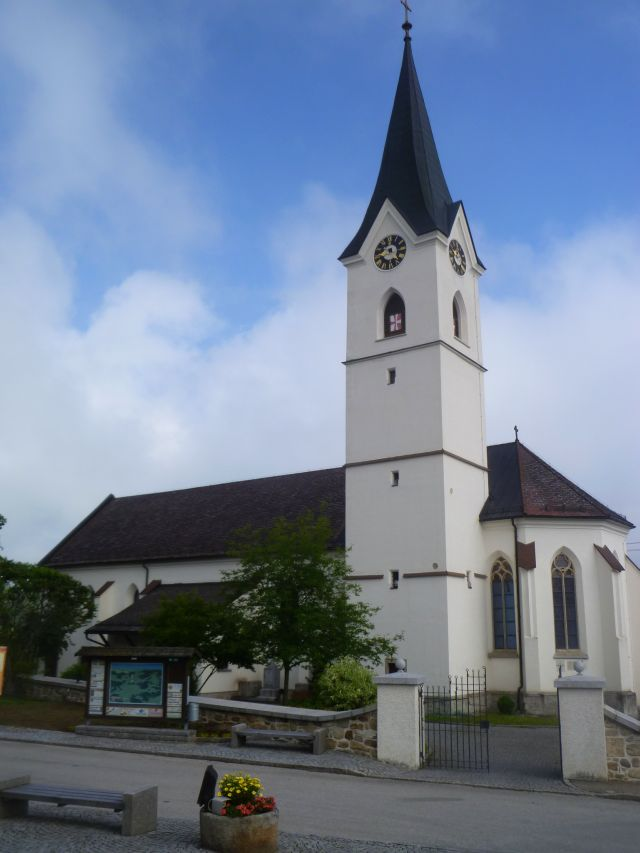

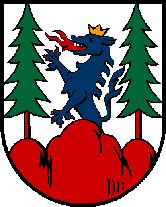
- Coat of arms

- Location within Austria
- Coordinates: 48°35′10″N 14°33′50″E
- Country: Austria
- State: Upper Austria
- District: Freistadt

Government
  - Mayor: Alfred Klepatsch (ÖVP)

Area
  - Total: 42.85 km^{2} (16.54 sq mi)
- Elevation: 723 m (2,372 ft)

Population (2018-01-01)
  - Total: 1,579
  - Density: 36.85/km^{2} (95.44/sq mi)
- Time zone: UTC+1 (CET)
  - Summer (DST): UTC+2 (CEST)
- Postal code: 4263
- Area code: 07943
- Vehicle registration: FR
- Website: www.windhaag.at

Windhaag bei Freistadt is a municipality in the district of Freistadt in the Austrian state of Upper Austria.

== Population ==
Historical population
Year	Pop.	±%
1869	1,685	—
1880	1,735	+3.0%
1890	1,738	+0.2%
1900	1,749	+0.6%
1910	1,841	+5.3%
1923	1,809	−1.7%
1934	1,855	+2.5%
1939	1,823	−1.7%
1951	1,829	+0.3%
1961	1,898	+3.8%
1971	1,886	−0.6%
1981	1,873	−0.7%
1991	1,848	−1.3%
2001	1,734	−6.2%
2012	1,641	−5.4%
