= William Lloyd Webber =

English organist and composer (1914–1982)

William Lloyd Webber CBE
- William Lloyd Webber, in the 1930s
- Born: William Southcombe Lloyd Webber; 11 March 1914; London, England
- Died: 29 October 1982 (aged 68); London, England
- Occupations: Organist; Composer; Music educator
- Years active: 1928–1982 (his death)
- Spouse: Jean Hermione Johnstone (1942–1982) (his death)

William Southcombe Lloyd Webber (11 March 1914 – 29 October 1982) was an English organist and composer, as a part of the modern classical music movement. Besides his long career, composing works ranging from choral pieces to instrumental items and more, he is known for being the father of his fellow composer Andrew Lloyd Webber, and the cellist Julian Lloyd Webber. He also served as a music educator, teaching students in harmony and counterpoint at the Royal College of Music, and was director of the London College of Music, as well as music director and organist at Methodist Central Hall for many years until his sudden death in 1982.

== Early years and education ==
Webber was born into a respectable, but relatively poor family in Chelsea in 1914, as the first of two children of William Charles Henry Webber (28 August 1886 – 1 November 1962), a self-employed plumber, and his wife, Winifred Mary Gittins (30 November 1888 – unknown death date). Their second child, Winifred Margaret Webber, was born on 27 November 1920 and died in September 1984 at age 63. According to Jean Lloyd Webber, her father-in-law was a semi-professional musician, who sang in several Anglican churches in London and also performed in BBC recitals, including musicals and The Black and White Minstrel Show. He was also a keen organ buff traveling to hear various organs in and around the capital. Often he would take his son with him and, before long, the young William started to play the organ himself and developed an interest in this instrument that bordered on the obsessional.

At the age of seven, William Webber joined the City Boys’ Choir of St. Mark’s, North Audley Street, Mayfair, and at age 13, he became sub-organist at St. Mary’s, Graham Street (now Bourne Street). Two years later, in 1929, he became organist at Christ Church, Newgate Street, where he served until 1932.

At age 14, William Webber had already become an organ recitalist, giving frequent performances at many churches and cathedrals throughout Great Britain, and he also made recordings for the BBC. He won an organ scholarship to the Mercers' School, later winning a further scholarship at the Royal College of Music, starting in 1931, where he studied composition with Ralph Vaughan Williams, harmony and counterpoint with Charles Herbert Kitson, and organ with Henry Ley and Henry Walford Davies.

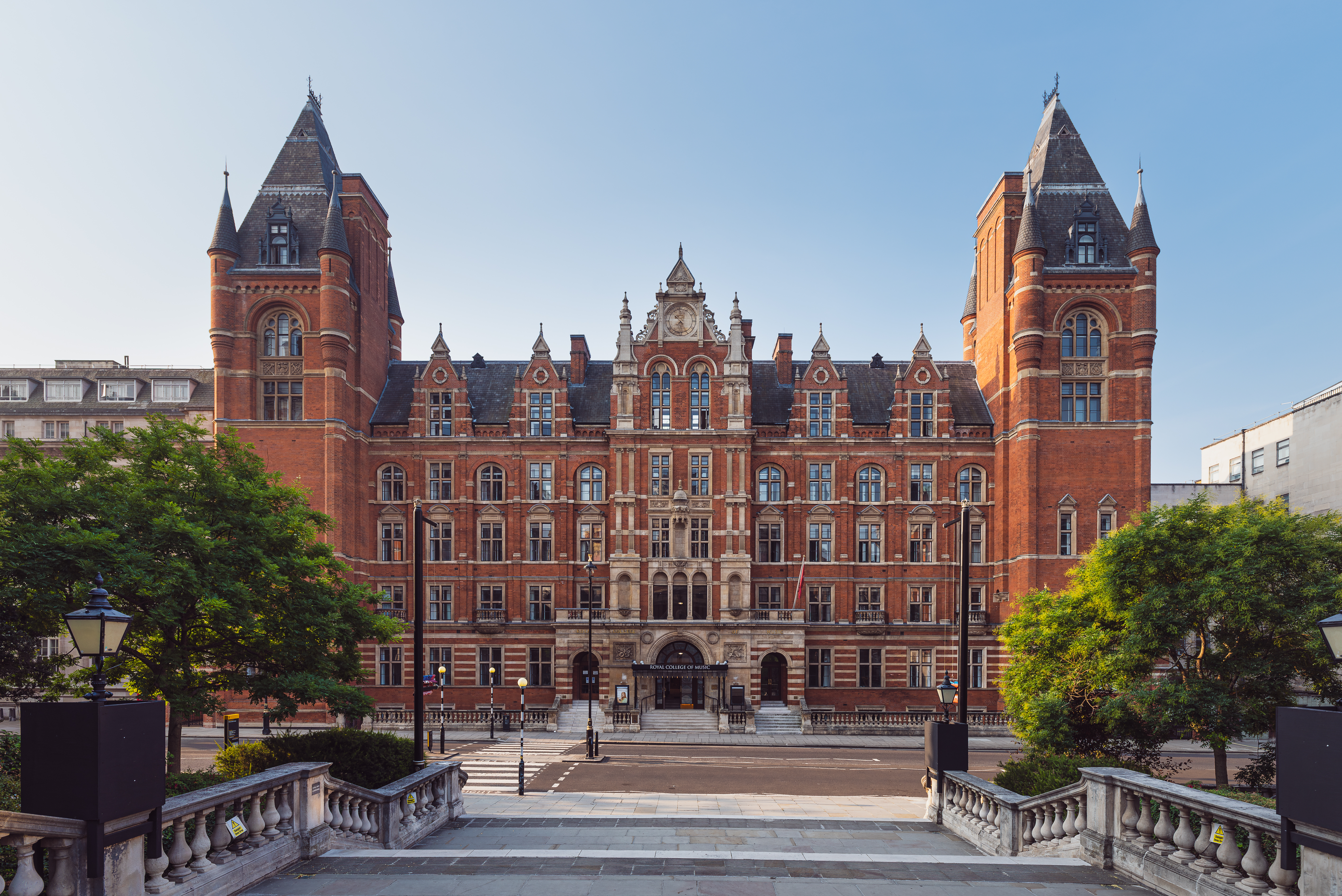
Royal College of Music

Because there was already another student at the college with the name William Webber, William continued to use his second middle name Lloyd from then on as part of his last name. In 1932, he became organist at St. Cyprian’s, Clarence Gate. In 1933, at the age of 19, Lloyd Webber received his Diploma of Fellow (FRCO), and, in 1938, his D.Mus. (Doctor of Music).

== Prolific years ==
Lloyd Webber's earliest known compositions are a Prelude and Fugue for organ (1936, unpublished), and the Fantasy Trio for violin, cello and piano, also from 1936, written at age 22; the Fantasy Trio was not premiered until 2 November 1995 by the Solomon Trio at the Purcell Room. Although World War II largely interrupted his compositional work (from 1939 to 1949, William Lloyd Webber served as organist and head of the choir school at All Saints, Margaret Street, in the Marylebone district of London), the end of the war in 1945 marked the beginning of Lloyd Webber's most productive years as a composer. In 1942, he married the pianist and violinist Jean Hermione Johnstone (1921–1993), with whom he had two sons who went on to achieve international fame: the composer Andrew Lloyd Webber (born 22 March 1948), and the cellist Julian Lloyd Webber (born 14 April 1951). To mark his wedding on 3 October 1942, William Lloyd Webber composed the Benedictus for violin and organ, which he dedicated to his wife, and which they performed together at their own wedding service.

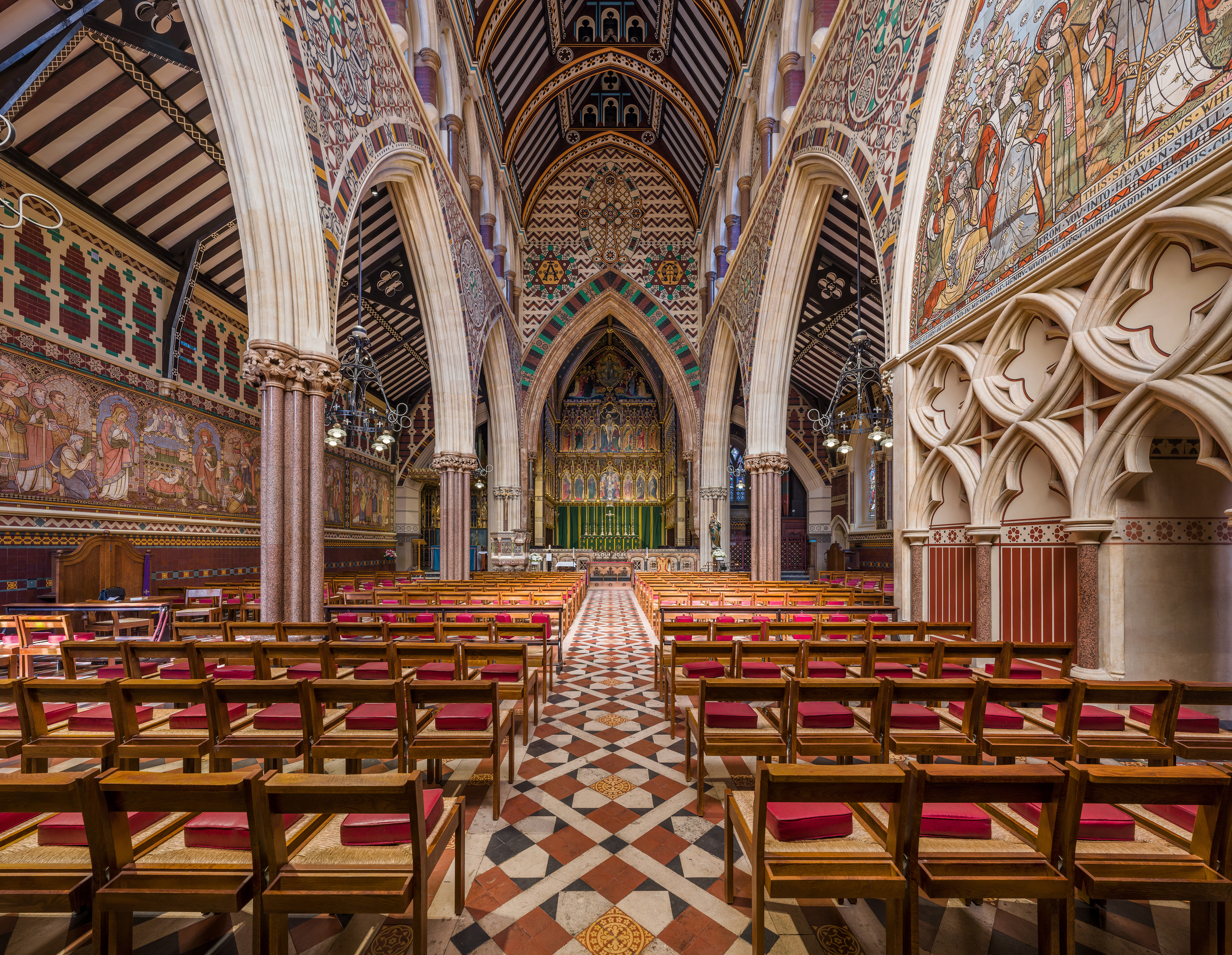
All Saints Margaret Street

From 1945 until the 1960s, William Lloyd Webber composed vocal and instrumental music, choral and organ works, chamber music and orchestral works. Compositions from this period include the oratorio St. Francis of Assisi (1948), and the symphonic poem Aurora for orchestra (1948). St. Francis of Assisi was never performed during William Lloyd Webber's lifetime; the world premiere performance took place at the Chelsea Festival on 23 June 2003 at Holy Trinity Sloane Street, featuring the Joyful Company of Singers and the Academy of St Martin in the Fields with the conductor Peter Broadbent. According to Julian Lloyd Webber, Aurora was performed once, soon after its composition, by a BBC orchestra under Alexander Gibson, and then fell into oblivion. An acetate recording had been made of the BBC performance, and in later years, Julian overheard his father listening to this recording in the middle of the night, "crying his eyes out". It was not until 1986 when Aurora was recorded for the first time by the London Philharmonic Orchestra under the direction of Lorin Maazel. William Lloyd Webber was not inclined to promote his music; as a consequence, he did neither try to arrange performances of his music, nor to contact concert promoters or editors of the musical press. His roots were firmly embedded in the romanticism of composers such as César Franck, Sergei Rachmaninov, and Jean Sibelius, and Lloyd Webber became increasingly convinced that his own music was 'out of step' with the prevailing climate of the time. Rather than to compromise his style, he turned to the academic side of British musical life. Between the 1950s and the late 1970s, Lloyd Webber composed primarily liturgical vocal and organ music, including twenty anthems, the six cantatas Songs of Spring (1953), The Divine Compassion (1954), Look on the fields (1955), The Saviour (1961), The Good Samaritan (1964), and Born a King (published posthumously in 1993), as well as the Missa Princeps Pacis (1962).

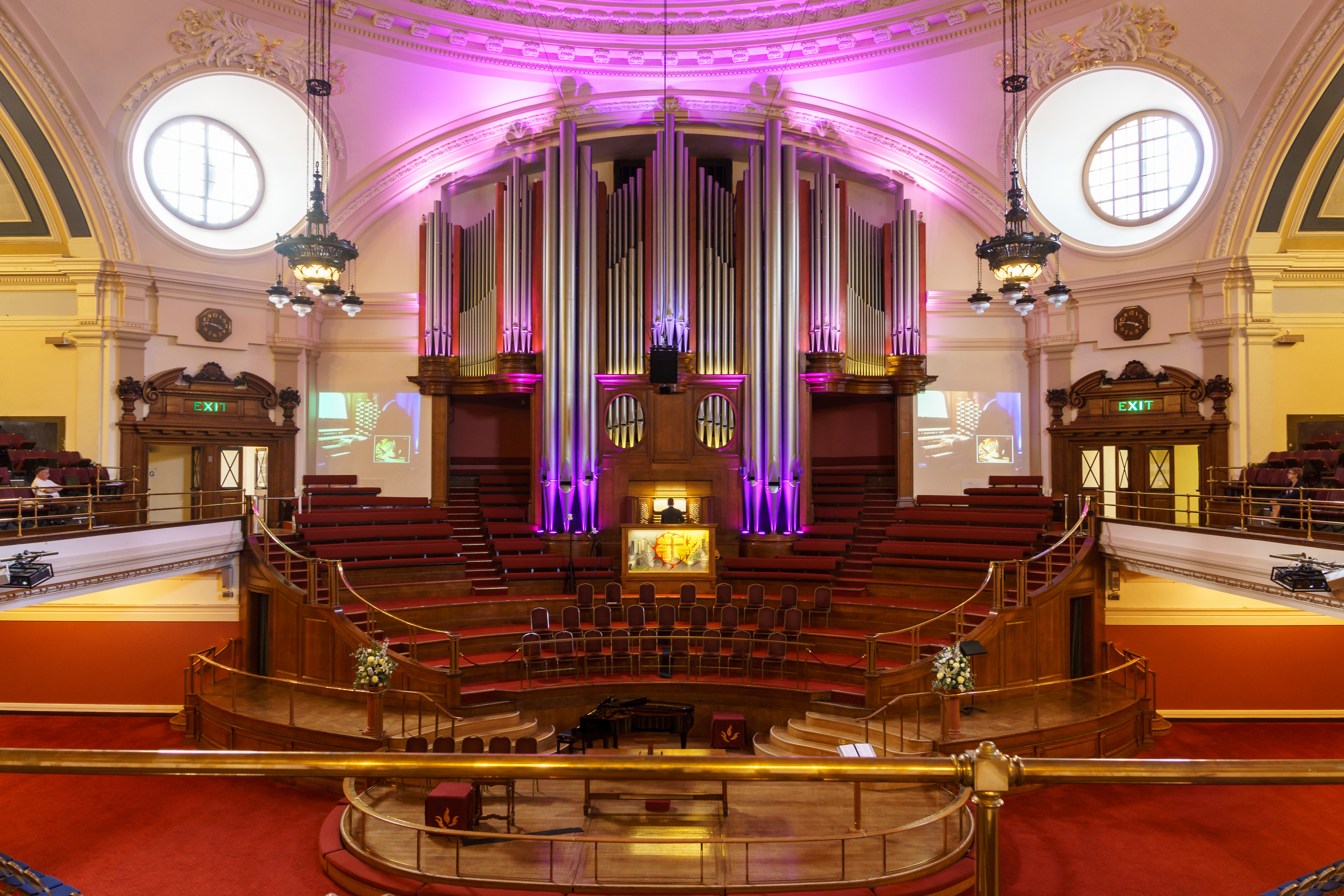
Methodist Central Hall

In 1946, Lloyd Webber was appointed professor of harmony and counterpoint at the Royal College of Music, where his many students included Malcolm Arnold, Julian Bream, and John Lill. In 1958, he became music director and organist at Methodist Central Hall, the headquarters of the Methodist church in the United Kingdom. In 1964, he also took on the role of director at the London College of Music. He held both positions until his death in 1982. Toward the end of his life, William Lloyd Webber turned his attention more fully to composing; during this period, he composed, among other works, the Missa Sanctae Mariae Magdalenae (1979) and Five Portraits for Home Organs (1980). In 1980, William Lloyd Webber was appointed Commander of the Order of the British Empire (CBE), in recognition of his services to the London College of Music.

William Lloyd Webber died suddenly in London in 1982 at the age of 68. He was cremated at the Golders Green Crematorium in London, and his ashes were scattered in the Lawns of Remembrance.

William Lloyd Webber’s compositional work has been experiencing a growing appreciation and rediscovery in recent years, not least due to the efforts of his son Julian Lloyd Webber, who has recorded and republished numerous compositions by his father.

Andrew Lloyd Webber's Requiem (1985) is dedicated to the memory of his father, William Lloyd Webber.

== Discography ==
- William Lloyd Webber: Aurora. Andrew Lloyd Webber: Variations on a Theme of Paganini for cello and orchestra. Julian Lloyd Webber, cello. London Philharmonic Orchestra/Lorin Maazel. Recorded at the Abbey Road Studios. London: Philips, 1986. 1 LP/1 CD/1 Cassette tape.
- Organ Works of William Lloyd Webber. Festal march (1953); Vesper hymn (1953); Prelude on Winchester New (1953); Chorale, Cantilena and Finale (1958); Prelude (1953); Intermezzo (1956); Slumber Song (1956); Elegy; Trumpet minuet (1953); Song without words (1953); Good King Wenceslas (1960); Coventry Carol (1960); God rest you merry, Gentlemen (1960); Aria (1953); Choral march (1953); Prelude on Stracathro (1975); Solemn Procession (1961); Three Recital Pieces (1952); Jane Watts at the Willis organ in Salisbury Cathedral. Leighton Buzzard, Bedfordshire: Priory Records, 1997. 1 CD.
- William Lloyd Webber: Invocation. Serenade for Strings (1961–1980); Invocation (1957); Lento (1939); Three Spring Miniatures for small orchestra (1952); Aurora (1948); Nocturne for cello and harp (1948); Love divine, all Loves excelling (1966); Benedictus for violin and organ (1942); Missa Princeps Pacis (1962); Jesus, Dear Jesus (1966). Tasmin Little, Julian Lloyd Webber, City of London Sinfonia, Richard Hickox. Colchester: Chandos, 1998. 1 CD.
- William Lloyd Webber: Piano Music, Chamber Music and Songs. Three Spring Miniatures for piano (1952); A Song for the Morning (Recreation – Six Pieces for piano, 1953); Mulberry Cottage for flute and piano (Country Impressions, 1960); Sonatina for flute and piano (1941); The Gardens At Eastwell (A Late Summer Impression) for flute an piano (1982); Air and Variations for clarinet and piano (1952); Frensham Pond (Aquarelles) for clarinet and piano (Country Impressions, 1960); Fantasy Trio (1936); Over the Bridge (1951); How do I love Thee; To the Wicklow Hills (1954); The Call of the Morning (1950); The Forest of Wild Thyme (1951); Sun-Gold; Love, like a drop of dew (1950); I looked out into the Morning (1951). John Mark Ainsley, Ian Brown, The Nash Ensemble. London: Hyperion, 1998. 1 CD.
- Sacred Choral Music of William Lloyd Webber. A hymn of Thanksgiving (1964); Missa Princeps Pacis (1962); Lo! My Shepherd is Divine; Dominus Firmamentum Meum; Missa Sanctae Mariae Magdalenae (1979); O Love, I give myself to Thee; Tantum Ergo; Magnificat and Nunc Dimittis in E minor (1956); Most glorious Lord of Lyfe! (1959); Love divine, all Loves excelling (1966); Sing the Life: Easter Carol (1965); The Stable where the Oxen stood; New Life in Christ. The Choir of All Saints Church, Margaret Street, London; Harry Bramma. Leighton Buzzard, Bedfordshire: Priory Records, 1999. 1 CD.
- William Lloyd Webber: The Saviour. Sing, O Heavens (1957); O for a closer walk with God (1957); Oh, Lord spread Thy wings oe’r me (1952); Six Interludes on Passion Hymns for organ (1963): There is a green hill far away; When I survey the wondrous Cross; Ride on, ride on in Majesty; O come and mourn with me awhile; O sacred head sore wounded; Praise to the holiest in the height (1963); The Saviour (1961). Shaun Turnbull (organ); Choir of Leeds Minster; Alexander Woodrow. Leighton Buzzard, Bedfordshire: Priory Records, 2025. 1 CD.
