= Mass in G major, K. 140 "Pastoral" =

Missa brevis in G major
- Mass by W. A. Mozart
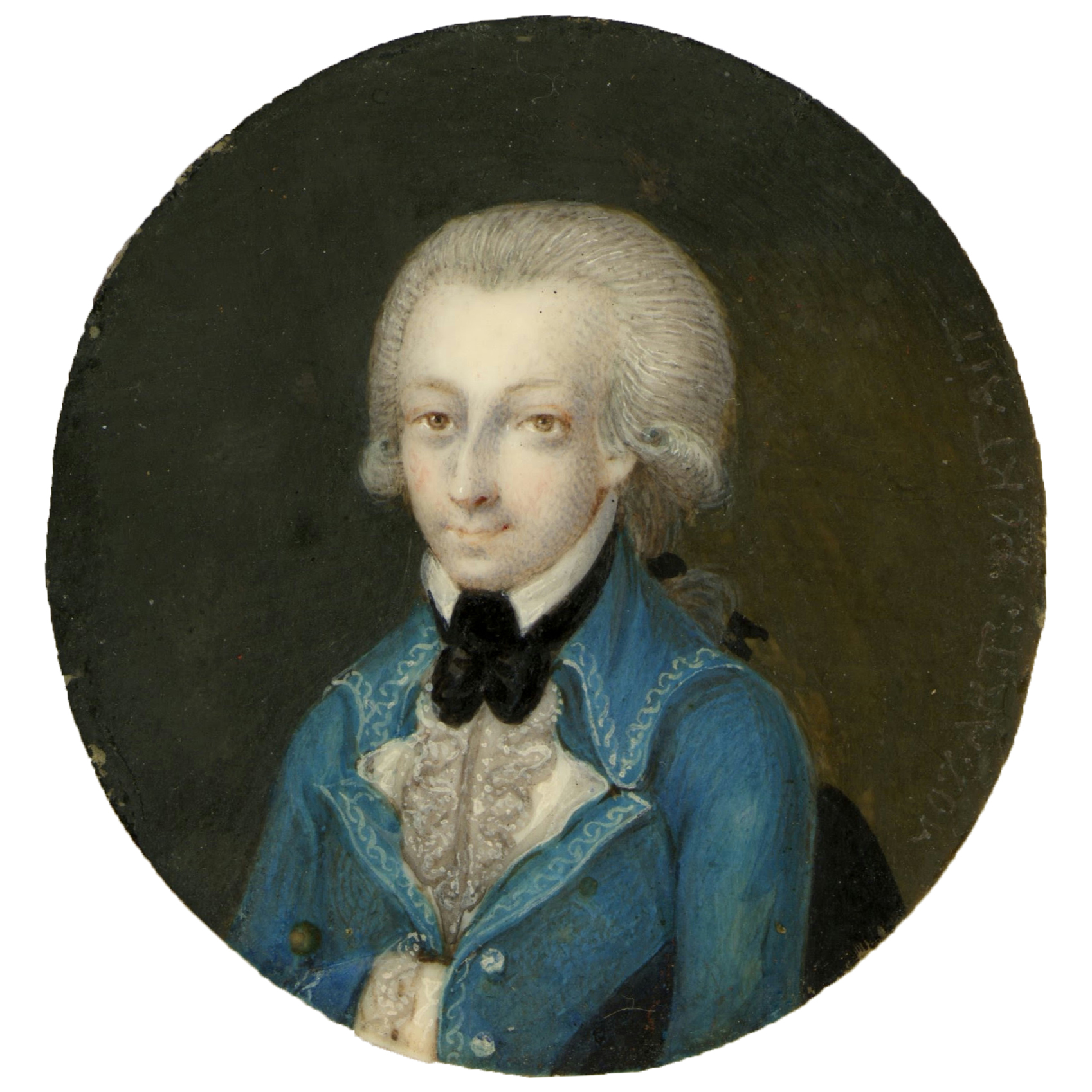
- 1773 miniature of Mozart
- Key: G major
- Catalogue: K. 140
- Composed: 1773: Salzburg
- Movements: 6
- Vocal: SATB choir and soloists
- Instrumental: strings; organ

The Missa brevis in G major, K. 140, K^{3} Anh. 235d, K^{6} Anh. C 1.12, was probably composed by Wolfgang Amadeus Mozart shortly after returning to Salzburg, in March 1773, from his third trip to Italy.

Walter Senn, who published the Mass in 1968 for the Neue Mozart-Ausgabe, notes that this Mass is the only one Mozart composed along the lines of the Pastoral Mass type.

== Attribution to Mozart - time of origin ==
Ludwig von Köchel, in the first edition of his catalog of Mozart's music, thought the Mass roughly contemporary with Lucio Silla and "Exsultate, jubilate" (1772-1773). Alfred Einstein thought its original composition to be closer to that of the sixth Serenade (1776) with his revision of Köchel's catalog in 1937. Otto Jahn, Franz Giegling and others thought it not to be by Mozart at all.

The work was accepted as genuine by Walter Senn: he published the Mass as No. 5 in the Neue Mozart-Ausgabe in 1968. The earliest surviving score and parts, found in a cloister in Augsburg, Germany, were prepared by a copyist, with completions and corrections in Mozart's hand. Senn assumes the Mass was composed in 1773, after Mozart had returned from Italy in March.

== Movements and orchestration ==
The mass is scored for soloists, choir, strings and organ, the latter playing from figured bass. The setting is divided into six movements:

1. Kyrie Andantino, G major, 3/4
2. Gloria Allegro, G major, 6/8
  "Laudamus te" Andantino, 3/8
3. Credo Allegro, G major,
  "Et incarnatus est" Andantino, E♭ major, 3/4
  "Et resurrexit" Allegro, G major,
4. Sanctus Andante, G major, 3/4
  "Pleni sunt caeli" Allegro vivace, 2/4
5. Benedictus Andante, C major, 2/4
  "Osanna" Allegro vivace, G major
6. Agnus Dei Andante, G major,
  "Dona nobis pacem" Allegro, G major, 3/8

== Sources ==
- Jonathan D. Green (2002). A Conductor's Guide to Choral-Orchestral Works, Classical Period: Volume 1: Haydn and Mozart New York: Scarecrow Press
- Daniel Heartz (1995). Haydn, Mozart, and the Viennese School: 1740 — 1780 New York: W. W. Norton & Co.
- (in German) Ludwig Ritter von Köchel. Chronologisch-Thematisches Verzeichniss sämmtlicher Tonwerke Wolfgang Amade Mozarts. Breitkopf & Härtel: Leipzig, 1862.
- (in German) Walter Senn (1968). Neue Mozart-Ausgabe. Series I (Sacred vocal music), Workgroup 1 (Masses and Requiem), Part 1: Masses, Volume 1. Bärenreiter.
