= Versions and editions of Bruckner's symphonies =

There have been many different versions and editions of the symphonies of Anton Bruckner.

== Synopsis ==
Title	Surname	Tonality	Composition, Revisions	Editions	Duration*
Symphony in F minor	Study Symphony	F minor	1863	Nowak [1973]	42 minutes
Symphony No. 1	Das kecke Beserl	C minor	1865–66 (early draft), 1866/1868, 1877/1884, 1891	1865–66: Grandjean [1995] 1866: Carragan [1998], 1868: Thomas Röder [2014] 1877/1884: Haas [1935], Nowak [1953] 1891: Doblinger [1893], Brosche [1980]	48–50 minutes
Symphony in D minor	Die Nullte	D minor	1869	Wöss [1924], Nowak [1968]	45 minutes
Symphony No. 2	Symphony of Pauses	C minor	1872, 1873^{1}, 1876^{1}, 1877, 1892^{2}	1872: Carragan [2005] 1873: Carragan; 1876: Carragan; 1877: Haas [1938]^{3}, Nowak [1965], Carragan [2007] 1892: Doblinger [1892]	51–62 minutes
Symphony No. 3	Wagner	D minor	1873, 1874^{4}, 1876^{5}, 1877–1878, 1889	1873: Nowak [1977] 1874: Carragan; 1876: Nowak [1980], Carragan; 1877–1878: Oeser [1950], Nowak [1981]^{6} 1889: Rättig [1890], Nowak [1959]	59–65 minutes
Symphony No. 4	Romantic	E♭ major	1874, 1878^{7}, 1880^{8}, 1881, 1886, 1887^{9}, 1888	1874: Nowak [1975], Korstvedt [2021] 1878: Haas [1936], Nowak [1981] (Volksfest Finale); Carragan, Korstvedt [2022] 1881: Haas [1936], Korstvedt [2019] 1886: Nowak [1953] 1888: Gutmann [1889], Korstvedt [2004]	60–67 minutes
Symphony No. 5		B♭ major	1876–1878	Doblinger [1896]^{10}, Haas [1935], Nowak [1951]	78 minutes
Symphony No. 6		A major	1881	Doblinger [1899]^{11}, Haas [1935], Nowak [1952]	60 minutes
Symphony No. 7		E major	1883–1885	Gutmann [1885], Haas [1944], Nowak [1954]	65 minutes
Symphony No. 8	Apocalyptic	C minor	1887, 1888^{12}, 1890, 1892^{13}	1887: Nowak [1972], Hawkshaw [2022] 1890: Haas [1939]^{14}, Nowak [1955] 1892: Haslinger-Schlesinger-Lienau	86–90 minutes
Symphony No. 9	(Unfinished)	D minor	1894	Doblinger [1903]^{15}, Orel [1932], Nowak [1951], Cohrs [2000] Finale sketches: Orel [1934], Phillips [1994–2002]	60 minutes ~18 minutes

* According to the Anton Bruckner's Gesamtausgabe. Duration depends on the concerned version.
^{1} variants of the 1872 version reconstituted by Carragan, ^{2} variant of the 1877 version, ^{3} "mixed version" 1872–1877, ^{4} refined variant of the 1873 version, ^{5} Adagio edited by Nowak, other movements reconstituted by Carragan, ^{6} Scherzo with coda, ^{7}version with the new "Hunting" Scherzo and the "Volksfest Finale", ^{8} 1878 version with a new Finale, unpublished, revised in 1881 and 1886, ^{9} slight revision, unpublished,
^{10} version revised by Franz Schalk, ^{11} edition revised by Joseph Schalk, ^{12} Adagio edited by Gault and Kawasaki [2003], other movements by Carragan, ^{13} version revised by Joseph Schalk, ^{14} "mixed version" 1887–1890, ^{15} version revised by Ferdinand Löwe.

== Early published editions ==
The first editions of Bruckner's works published by Theodor Rättig, Albert Gutmann, Haslinger–Schlesinger–Lienau and Ludwig Doblinger during and slightly after Bruckner's lifetime tended to "incorporate orchestral retouching, alterations in phrasing, articulation, and dynamics, and added tempo and expression markings," and on occasion were cut. These changes were made by Bruckner's friends and associates, and it is not always possible to tell whether the emendations had Bruckner's direct authorization. These were the versions that were used for nearly all performances until the 1930s. Cooke judges all these publications as "spurious" because they "did not represent Bruckner's own intentions", while Korstvedt classifies them into three categories:

- Not authentic: versions that "contain extensive modifications and additions made without Bruckner's approval, participation, or knowledge".
- Authentic: "authentic versions prepared, supervised, and authorized by Bruckner. They do contain some elements that did not originate from the composer, but especially in the light of his publication of them, this is not enough reason to reject them."
- Grey area: publications that "differ in some ways from the readings of Bruckner's last manuscript scores and certain contain some external editorial emendations ... yet they were published with Bruckner's apparent approval." "More study is needed" into these texts.

Korstvedt argues that it was not uncommon for differences to exist between the autograph manuscripts and the first publications of musical works in the late 19th century, and that while the discrepancies in Bruckner's case are "unusually pronounced" they are not "essentially aberrant." He points to the example of Verdi's Falstaff, whose musical text contains substantial contributions from the leader of the orchestra of La Scala which were apparently welcomed by the composer.

Work	Published	Cooke (1969)	Korstvedt (2004)
First Symphony	1893	Spurious	Grey area
Second Symphony	1892	Spurious	Grey area
Third Symphony	1879	Spurious	Authentic
Third Symphony	1890	Spurious	Authentic
Fourth Symphony	1889/90	Spurious	Authentic
Fifth Symphony	1896	Spurious	Not authentic
Sixth Symphony	1899	Spurious	Not authentic
Seventh Symphony	1885	Spurious	Authentic
Eighth Symphony	1892	Spurious	Grey area
Ninth Symphony	1903	Spurious	Not authentic

== Notable editors ==
=== Robert Haas ===
Robert Haas produced a critical edition based on Bruckner's original scores during the 1930s, that was endorsed by the Third Reich.

Haas issued critical editions of Symphonies 1 (1877 version), 2 (1877 version), 4 (1881 version – aka 1878/1880), 5, 6, 7 and 8 (1890 version).

In 1934 Alfred Orel issued a critical edition of Symphony No. 9 and of the sketches of its Finale.
In 1950 Fritz Oeser issued a critical edition of Symphony No. 3 (1877/1878 version).

=== Leopold Nowak ===
While the Allies enforced denazification, Haas' work was frowned upon and his rival Leopold Nowak was appointed to produce a whole new edition from scratch.

From the 1950s onwards, Nowak revised and re-issued the editions of Haas, Wöss, Oeser and Orel. He claimed that in the case of Symphonies No. 2 and No. 8, Haas had mixed and matched passages from an early version and a later version to create "hybrid" scores. However, when the manuscripts became available in microfilm, it was found that the passages that Haas had allegedly mixed in from earlier manuscripts were actually present, but crossed out in the manuscript that Haas worked with; Bruckner wrote a letter to the conductor Felix Weingartner, in which he mentioned the cut passages and hoped that they will prove "valid for posterity, and for a circle of friends and connoisseurs".

Beside the 1876, 1877/1878 (re-issue with the Coda of the Scherzo) et 1889 versions of Symphony No. 3, Nowak issued the until that time forgotten, first version of Symphonies 3, 4 and 8.

In 1980 Günter Brosche re-issued the 1891 version of Symphony No. 1.

=== William Carragan ===
William Carragan went on with the restitution of critical issues of Bruckner's symphonies.

In 1998 Carragan reconstituted and issued the 1866, original version of Symphony No. 1. In 2005, he reconstituted and edited the 1872 version of Symphony No. 2, as well as its intermediate versions of 1873 and 1876. He also reviewed the 1877 version of Nowak, in which he corrected some residual errors. This revision, which is conform to Bruckner's manuscript, has been recorded by Daniel Barenboim with the Berlin Philharmonic Orchestra. Carragan also reconstituted the 1874 revision of Symphony No. 3, the 1878 version of Symphony No. 4 and the 1888 variants of Symphony No. 8. As last he reconstituted the complete 1876 version of Symphony No. 3.

Some convinced Brucknerians, as Eliahu Inbal, Georg Tintner and, more recently, Simone Young and Marcus Bosch, have recorded the "forgotten" first versions of Symphonies No. 1, 2, 3, 4 and 8.

The 1874 revision of Symphony No. 3 and the 1888 variant of Symphony No. 8 have been premiered and recorded by Gerd Schaller, Philharmonie Festiva. The complete 1876 version of the Symphony was premiered by Richard Pittman and the New England Philharmonic Orchestra on 2 March 2019 in Boston, Massachusetts.

=== Benjamin-Gunnar Cohrs, Benjamin Korstvedt and Paul Hawkshaw ===
In 2000 Benjamin-Gunnar Cohrs issued a new edition of Symphony No. 9, in which he corrected some errors he had found in Nowak's edition. The premiere of Cohrs’ edition together with the sketches of the Finale issued by John Alan Phillips have been recorded by Nikolaus Harnoncourt.

In 2004 Benjamin Korstvedt issued a critical edition of the 1888 version of Symphony No. 4. This version has been premiered by Akira Naito. Thereafter, Korstvedt issued the 1876 variant of the first version of the Symphony, and reissued the second version of 1881 and the initial second version of 1878. The 1878 version has been premiered by Warren Cohen with the MusicaNova Orchestra 1 May 2022.

Paul Hawkshaw has issued a new edition of the 1887 version of Symphony No. 8. This new edition has been premiered by Peter Oundjian with the Yale Symphony Orchestra on 27 October 2017.

Attempts have also been made to reconstitute the original concepts of 1876–1877 of Symphony No. 5.

== Critical edition ==
Symphony in F minor ("Studiensymphonie"; 1863) – Nowak (1973)

Symphony No. 1 in C minor

- Early Adagio (1865/1866, fragment) & Scherzo (1865) – Wolfgang Grandjean (1995)
- Linz version (Urfassung of 1866) – Carragan (1998). Not included in the current Kritische Gesamtausgabe
- 1868 version used for the premiere performance – Thomas Röder (2014) in the in-progress, new version of the Gesamtausgabe.
- Revised Linz version (1877) – Nowak (1953)
- Vienna version (1890–1891) – Günter Brosche (1980)

Symphony in D minor ("No. 0"; 1869) – Nowak (1968)

Symphony No. 2 in C minor

- First version (1872) – Carragan (2005)
- Second version (1877) – Carragan (1997)

Symphony No. 3 in D minor ("Wagner Symphony")

- First version (1873) – Nowak (1977)
- 1876 Adagio – Nowak (1980)
- Second version (1877–1878) – Nowak (1981)
- Third version (1889) – Nowak (1959)

Symphony No. 4 in E♭ major ("Romantic")

- First version (1874) – Nowak (1975)
- 1878 Finale – Nowak (1981)
- Second version (1886, aka 1878/1880) – Nowak (1953)
- Third version (1888) – Korstvedt (2004)

Symphony No. 5 in B♭ major (1876–1878) – Nowak (1951)

Symphony No. 6 in A major (1881) – Nowak (1952)

Symphony No. 7 in E major (1883–1885) – Nowak (1954)

Symphony No. 8 in C minor

- First version (1887) – Nowak (1972), Hawkshaw
- 1888 Adagio – Dermot Gault and Takanobu Kawasaki (2003). Not included in the current Kritische Gesamtausgabe
- Second version (1890) – Nowak (1955)

Symphony No. 9 in D minor

- First movement – Scherzo & Trio – Adagio (1894) – Critical new edition by Cohrs (2000)
- Finale fragment (1895/1896) – John A. Phillips (1994–2002)
- Two posthumous trios for the Scherzo with viola solo – Cohrs (1998)
  - Trio No. 1 in F major (1889)
  - Trio No. 2 in F♯ major (1893)

== Sources ==
- Cooke, Deryck (1969), "The Bruckner Problem Simplified", Musical Times, CX (1511): 59–62, ISSN 0027-4666, JSTOR 953722
- Korstvedt, Benjamin (2004), "Bruckner editions: the revolution revisited", in Williamson, John (ed.), The Cambridge Companion to Bruckner, Cambridge Companions to Music, Cambridge University Press, ISBN 0-521-00878-6
