= Symphony No. 2 (Bruckner) =

Symphony by Anton Bruckner

- by Anton Bruckner
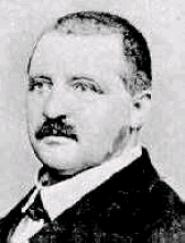
- A portrait of Anton Bruckner, c. 1860
- Other name: Symphony of Pauses
- Key: C minor
- Catalogue: WAB 102
- Composed: 1872
- Published: 1892: 1892 (ed. Wöss); 1938 (ed. Robert Haas); 1965 (ed. Leopold Nowak); 2005 (ed. William Carragan) (first version, 1872); 2007 (ed. William Carragan) (second version, 1877)
- Recorded: 1953
- Movements: 4

Premiere
- Date: 26 October 1873 (1873 version)
- Location: Vienna
- Conductor: Anton Bruckner
- Performers: Vienna Philharmonic

Anton Bruckner's Symphony No. 2 in C minor, sometimes known as the "Symphony of Pauses", was completed in 1872. It was actually the fourth symphony composed by Bruckner, after the Symphony in F minor (1863), the Symphony No. 1 in C minor (1866), and the Unnumbered Symphony in D minor (1869).

== History ==
In the fall of 1871, after having become established in Vienna, Anton Bruckner embarked on a new symphonic project, his fourth, which in less than a year would result in a completed and copied score of nearly 2000 bars. The Symphony No. 2, which was mostly written in the summer of 1872, represents a breakthrough in Bruckner's conception of the symphony. Although Bruckner had been composing sonata-form movements with three distinct themes since he began writing symphonies in 1862, in 1872 he greatly expanded the scope of their presentation and development, and established the framework, which he would use consistently in all of his subsequent symphonic work. Moreover, the Adagio of this symphony is in ABA′B′A″ Lied form followed by a coda – the framework which Bruckner would use in his subsequent symphonic work, with exception of the Sixth.

The Second Symphony is the only numbered Bruckner symphony without a dedication; Franz Liszt tacitly rejected the dedication, and Richard Wagner chose the Symphony No. 3 in D minor when offered both works. The symphony was planned to be performed in the same year by the Vienna Philharmonic under Otto Dessoff. However, the rehearsal did not lead to a performance, because Dessoff and a number of players considered it impossible to perform. Nevertheless, the symphony was premiered the following year, on 26 October 1873, by the Vienna Philharmonic with Bruckner himself on the podium.

== Description ==
The score calls for two flutes, two oboes, two clarinets, two bassoons, four horns, two trumpets, three trombones, timpani, and strings.

The symphony has four movements. In the first version (1872) they are:

1. Allegro: Ziemlich schnell (C minor)
2. Adagio (A♭ major)
3. Scherzo (C minor) – Trio (C major)
4. Finale (C minor)

In the second version (1877) they are:

1. Moderato
2. Andante: Feierlich, etwas bewegt
3. Scherzo: Mäßig schnell – Trio: Gleiches tempo
4. Finale: Mehr schnell

The description below will use the tempo markings of the latter version.

=== First movement ===
The symphony opens with tremolo strings and the lyrical main theme emerges from under this:

Note that although there is tremolo, it is a somewhat slower tremolo than what Bruckner would employ in later symphonies. Shortly after this, an "enigmatic" trumpet call appears:

This rhythm is an important device and will recur throughout the movement. The first theme group closes with one of the symphony's characteristic pauses and leads to the second theme group in E flat major:

The third theme group is also in E♭ major:

The trumpet call from the first group recurs here. The movement heads into its development after a brief codetta. The recapitulation opens just as the exposition did; with tremolo strings giving way to the main theme and the reappearance of the trumpet call. At the end, there is a brief recollection of the main theme before a grand peroration closes the movement. The first part of the coda is cut in the second version.

=== Andante/Adagio ===
This movement opens quietly with the strings:

This movement is the first Bruckner slow movement in five-part ternary form and so this part will recur twice. The second part of the movement begins with pizzicato strings introducing a new theme on the horns:

The second part was cut roughly in half in the second version. The latter half contained a decorated restatement of the horn theme. However, the fourth part of the movement contains a similar (But not identical) passage in both versions. Near the end of the movement, Bruckner quotes from the Benedictus of his F minor Mass before the main theme begins the coda:

=== Scherzo ===
In the first version, both sections of the Scherzo and both sections of the Trio are repeated. These repeats were excised in the second version. The Scherzo is based on rhythmic theme heard at the outset:

The Trio is based on a "tipsy" melody in the violas:

=== Fourth movement ===
The movement opens quietly with the second violins playing an eighth-note accompaniment and the first violins playing a descending scale:

This leads to the second theme of the first theme group, a loud passage given by the full orchestra that will recur as the main theme of the third theme group:

The quiet opening returns after this and leads into the A major second theme group, called "Schubertian" by Georg Tintner:

The exposition closes with a quote of the Kyrie of the F minor Mass. The development contains what William Carragan refers to as "fantasies" on the first and second theme groups. The recapitulation begins with the loud secondary theme of the first group before moving into the quieter first theme. Among other cuts between versions, one of note is in the coda of the movement. In the original version the coda is in two phases; a buildup leading to quotations of the first movement and the second theme group of this movement. This leads to the second phase, another buildup leading to the grand peroration in C major that closes the symphony. The first of these phases is cut in the second version, leaving only the final buildup and peroration.

== Versions ==
The composer made two versions of this symphony recognised by the Internationale Bruckner-Gesellschaft (1872 and 1877). The work was also adjusted by the composer right before its premiere, as well as in 1876 and 1892.

=== First version, 1872 ===
This was published in an edition by William Carragan under the auspices of the Internationale Bruckner-Gesellschaft in 2005. The Scherzo comes second; the slow movement follows. Georg Tintner: "Bruckner's mania for revision sometimes bore positive fruits ... [but with] the Second and the Third [symphonies] his first versions seem to me the best."

==== 1873 revision ====
Bruckner made adjustments preparing for the 1873 premiere.

- First movement: Rhythmic trombones were added on bars 129–135 and 446–452.
- Adagio: In the fifth section a solo violin was added from bar 150 to bar 164. During the rehearsal, violin soloist Heinz Haunold told: "... the violin solo at that point of the movement effectively prevented the orchestra from rising to the great climax ... but it also contained a fatal trap for the performers of the symphony."

The violin solo ... in duple quarters and duple eighths, ... together with the rhythmic complexities already caused by the shift from sextuplets to quintuplets in the first violins, ... must have created an amazingly detailed sound – not to say an impenetrable musical fog."

In the coda, the solo horn, which was considered unplayable by the horn-player, was replaced by the first clarinet and the viola section.

- Scherzo: The repeats were deleted.
- Finale: A "very dissonant section of the development", which includes at one point a striking alternation of short viola notes with pizzicato chords in the rest of the strings, was removed. These original bold and adventurous bars 305–360 were substituted for a new, 24-bar, very charming "Neuer Satz" (new passage).
  In the peroration, a fourth trombone is added to enhance the contrabass part.

==== 1876 revision ====
In 1876, Bruckner made additional, smaller changes prior the second performance, which occurred on 20 February 1876 in the Musikvereinsaal under Bruckner's baton.
For the performance of 1876, the inner movements were not altered, the violin solo in the Adagio was kept, and the internal Scherzo repeats remained cancelled. In the first movement, a cut was made in the coda. In the Finale, the fantasy on the second theme following the “Neuer Satz” was made more concise, a cut was also made in the coda, the peroration was recomposed and the additional trombone was removed.

=== Second Version, 1877 ===
Bruckner crossed out the second half of section 2 of the slow movement, judged too difficult for the solo horn – with, as a result, an imbalance in the structure of the movement – and re-orchestrated its section 5. He also made additional cuts in the first movement and the Finale, and dropped the "Neuer Satz" and substituted it for an 18-bar long, new material.

- Haas edition (1938): this edition is based on the 1877 version, with, however, some features of the first version.
- Nowak edition (1965): this edition still contains residues of the Haas' "mixed version" - among others an error in the trumpet parts at the end of the first movement:
- Carragan edition (2007): this edition is a critical edition of the 1877 version of the symphony. Carragan explained its origin: "After a bit of discussion, Hofrat Nowak asked me to prepare a new edition of the symphony for the Collected Edition, knowing, as many others did as well, that he had not dealt fully with the problems of the Haas edition in 1965."

In his edition Carragan put the crossed-out second half of section 2 of the slow movement (bars 48–69) as optional, explaining, "In my edition of the Second I kept that music in the score, and borrowing from Haas marked it with a 'vide', to be retained at the conductor's option. In the preface I point out that if the pure 1877 version of the symphony is desired, the cut must be made, but some conductors are keeping the music and in my opinion as a listener, the effect is better."

==== 1892 edition ====
This, the first published edition of the symphony, was prepared by Cyrill Hynais and was until recently thought to be inauthentic, but Carragan has shown that it corresponds closely to the 1877 version. This first edition was performed on 25 November 1894 by the Vienna Philharmonic under Hans Richter.

== Discography ==
The first recording of any part of the symphony was made by Fritz Zaun with the Berlin State Opera Orchestra in 1934: a cut version of the Scherzo in the 1892 first published edition. The oldest surviving complete performance is by Georg-Ludwig Jochum with the Bruckner Orchestra of Linz, dating from 1944 and using the Haas edition. The first commercial recording was by Volkmar Andreae with the Vienna Symphony Orchestra in 1953, also using the Haas edition.

=== First version, 1872 ===
==== Carragan's edition ====
- Kurt Eichhorn conducting the Bruckner Orchestra Linz, 1991 (first recording, using a pre-publ. Carragan ed.), Camerata 15CM-379 & 30CM-195
- Georg Tintner conducting the RTÉ National Symphony Orchestra, 1996 (using a pre-publ. Carragan ed.), Naxos
- Simone Young conducting the Hamburg Philharmonic Orchestra, 2006, BMG SACD
- Gerd Schaller conducting the Philharmonie Festiva, live recording, 2011, Profil PH 12022
- Herbert Blomstedt conducting the Leipzig Gewandhaus Orchestra, 2012, Querstand SACD
- Rémy Ballot conducting the Saint-Florian Altomonte Orchestra, 2019, Gramola Hybrid SACD 99211

==== 1873 variant ====
- Kurt Eichhorn conducting the Bruckner Orchestra Linz, 1991, Camerata 30CM-196

==== 1876 variant ====
- Kurt Eichhorn conducting the Bruckner Orchestra Linz, abruckner.com BSVD-0103

NB: composite recording prepared in 2007 by William Carragan and John Berky, using three Camarata recordings (15CM-380, 30CM-195 and 30CM-196) conducted by Kurt Eichhorn

=== Second version, 1877 ===
==== Haas's (mixed) edition ====
- Franz Konwitschny conducting the Berlin Radio Symphony Orchestra, live recording, 1951, Berlin Classics
- Erich Schmid conducting the Southwest German Radio Symphony Orchestra, studio recording, 1965, Ampex
- Horst Stein conducting the Vienna Philharmonic Orchestra, studio recording, 1973, Decca/London
- Günter Wand conducting the Cologne Radio Symphony Orchestra, studio recording, 1981, RCA
- Christoph Eschenbach conducting the Houston Symphony Orchestra, live recording, 1996, Koch

==== Nowak's edition ====
- Carlo Maria Giulini conducting the Vienna Symphony Orchestra, studio recording, 1974, Testament
- Eugen Jochum conducting the Staatskapelle Dresden, studio recording, 1980, EMI
- Herbert von Karajan conducting the Berliner Philharmoniker, studio recording, 1981, Deutsche Grammophon
- Stanisław Skrowaczewski conducting the Saarbrücken Radio Symphony Orchestra, studio recording, 1999, Arte Nova/Oehms Classics
- Hiroshi Wakasugi conducting the Saarbrücken Radio Symphony Orchestra, studio recording, 2004, Arte Nova
- Thomas Dausgaard conducting the Swedish Chamber Orchestra, studio recording, 2010, BIS
- Riccardo Muti conducting the Vienna Philharmonic, live recording, 2016, Deutsche Grammophon

==== Carragan's edition ====
Daniel Barenboim conducting the Berlin Philharmonic Orchestra, 1997 (using a pre-publ. Carragan ed.) - Teldec CD 3984 21485-2

A few other recent recordings use also the Carragan's edition:

- Paavo Järvi with the Frankfurt Radio Symphony - Sony SACD SICC 10218, 2011
  NB: in the coda of Adagio the clarinet is replaced by a horn
- Mario Venzago with the Northern Sinfonia - CPO 777 735-2, 2011
- Daniel Barenboim with the Staatskapelle Berlin - DG Set 479 6985, 2012
- Marek Janowski with the Orchestre de la Suisse Romande - Pentatone Classics SACD PTC 5186 448, 2012

==== 1892 edition ====
A few recordings use this first edition:

- Hermann Scherchen conducting the Toronto Symphony Orchestra, 1965, Disco Archivia CD - with a large cut (bars 388-512) in the Finale
- Cristian Mandeal conducting the Cluj-Napoca Philharmonic Orchestra - Electrecord LP ST-ECE 02731/32/33, 1984
- Hun-Joung Lim conducting the Korean Symphony Orchestra, 2016, Decca

== Sources ==
- Anton Bruckner, Sämtliche Werke, Kritische Gesamtausgabe – Band 2: II. Symphonie c-Moll (Originalfassung), Musikwissenschaftlicher Verlag der internationalen Bruckner-Gesellschaft, Robert Haas (editor), Vienna, 1938
- Anton Bruckner: Sämtliche Werke: Band II: II. Symphonie c-Moll, Musikwissenschaftlicher Verlag der Internationalen Bruckner-Gesellschaft, Vienna
  - II/1: Fassung 1872, William Carragan (editor), 2005
  - II/2: Fassung 1877, Leopold Nowak (editor), 1965; new edition by William Carragan, 2007
