= Hans-Hubert Schönzeler =

Hans-Hubert Schönzeler (22 June 1925 – 30 April 1997) was a German-born Australian-naturalised English-resident composer, conductor and musicologist who became an authority on Anton Bruckner and Antonín Dvořák.

He was born in Leipzig, an only child, and studied the violin from the age of five. Although his family was not Jewish, he was sent to Brussels so as to avoid contact with the Hitler Youth. In 1939 his family emigrated to Australia where, on the outbreak of the Second World War, his father was interned as an enemy alien. Hans-Hubert went to Sydney Boys High School, but in 1941 he and his mother were also interned for the duration of the war. During these years he continued to study music. He also studied conducting with a former director of the Vienna Boys' Choir. He was released in 1946 and was naturalised as an Australian in 1947. He attended the New South Wales State Conservatorium, where he studied with Eugene Goossens.

With assistance from Rafael Kubelík, Schönzeler settled in London in 1950, and went to work for Eulenburg Editions. He was later a director of the company. He conducted the 20th-Century Ensemble in London from 1951 to 1962. He studied at the Paris Conservatoire and the Accademia Musicale Chigiana in Siena, and worked as a freelance conductor in many countries as well as the UK. He conducted the concert at the Royal Albert Hall in 1964 marking the 10th anniversary of the death of Wilhelm Furtwängler, whose biography he later wrote. In 1967 he commenced a long association with the West Australian Symphony Orchestra.

Schönzeler became a noted expert on Bruckner: in 1970 he wrote a book on the composer; in 1973 he conducted the world premiere of the first version of the Eighth Symphony; at the 1978 Adelaide Festival he conducted the world premiere of the authentic first version of the Third Symphony. He was honoured by the International Bruckner Society, Vienna, the Bruckner Society of America and he also won the Bruckner Medal of Honor.

He was also a keen performer of the works of Dvořák; as well as writing a biography, he appeared at the Prague Spring Festival in 1974 and was made an honorary member of the Antonín Dvořák Society in 1975. He also edited symphonies by Joseph Haydn and Carl Maria von Weber.

His recorded legacy includes works by Bruckner, Edmund Rubbra, Sir Arthur Bliss, Mozart and Beethoven.

Hans-Hubert Schonzeler died in England in 1997.

== Selected compositions ==
- Sonata for viola and piano, Op.5 (1975)
- Tristesse, 5 Songs on texts by Paul Verlaine for voice and piano or string orchestra

== Sources ==
- Robert Ponsonby Obituary: Hans-Hubert Schonzeler The Independent 8 May 1997
