= Symphony No. 1 (Bruckner) =

Symphony by Anton Bruckner

- by Anton Bruckner
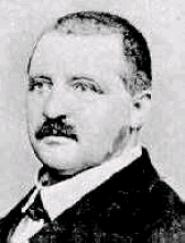
- Portrait of Anton Bruckner, c. 1860
- Key: C minor
- Catalogue: WAB 101
- Composed: 1865–1866 (Linz version); 1890–1891 (Vienna version)
- Dedication: University of Vienna
- Movements: 4

Premiere
- Date: 1868
- Conductor: Anton Bruckner

Anton Bruckner's Symphony No. 1 in C minor, WAB 101, was the first symphony the composer thought worthy of performing and bequeathing to the Austrian National Library. Chronologically it comes after the Study Symphony in F minor and before the "nullified" Symphony in D minor. (Symphony No. 2 in C minor was completed after the "nullified" Symphony in D minor.) The composer gave it the nickname Das kecke Beserl (The Saucy Maid), and conducted its 1868 premiere. Much later, after Bruckner was granted an honorary University of Vienna doctorate in 1891, he dedicated the 1890–1891 version of the work to that institution.

== Structure ==
The symphony has four movements. In the Linz version (1866-1868) they are:

1. Allegro (C minor)
  NB: The first bar, that was not yet present in 1868, was added in the revision of 1877
2. Adagio (A♭ major)
3. Scherzo: Schnell (fast; G minor)—Trio: Langsamer (slower; G major)
4. Finale: Bewegt, feurig (moving, fiery; C minor, ending in C major)

In the Vienna Version (1891) they are:

1. Allegro (C minor)
2. Adagio (A♭ major)
3. Scherzo: Lebhaft (lively; G minor)—Trio: Langsam (slow; G major)
4. Finale: Bewegt, feurig (moving, fiery; C minor, ending in C major)

The choices of key for the first two movements mirror Beethoven's for his Fifth Symphony, but Bruckner has the timpani retune to A♭ and E♭.

== Versions ==
=== Early Adagio and Scherzo ===
Before completing the symphony in April 1866, Bruckner composed other forms of the Adagio and the Scherzo.

The Adagio was first conceived in classical sonata form, with development, not the ternary structure with elaborate middle section. The exposition and the recapitulation are similar to that of the Linz version. In the beginning of its central section a third Schumanesque motif is introduced, which will be partially re-used as accompaniment of the oboe solo of the middle section of the Linz version. This early version of the Adagio (manuscript Mus.Hs.40400) was partially orchestrated, without trumpets or trombones. The recapitulation of the first motif is played by the strings and decorated by the winds. The recapitulation of the second subject, which was sketched only by the second violins and the woodwinds, breaks off at bar 154. Thereafter, five bars were left unwritten before the – on the contrary – fully orchestrated close of the movement.

The originally conceived Scherzo was not fully orchestrated either, lacking trumpets and trombones, but its Trio was carried over unchanged in 1866. The scherzo of this draft version exhibits many irregular phrase rhythms which Bruckner evened out in later versions. This early Scherzo (manuscript Mus.Hs.6019) is very short and quite distant in character from what Bruckner eventually used in the Linz version. In the leaflet for his recording of the symphony, Tintner writes that "the earlier very short Scherzo, which Bruckner discarded before 1866 (because of its brevity?), with chromatic syncopation, is perhaps more interesting [than the final one]."

A recording of these early (incomplete) Adagio and Scherzo by Osmo Vänskä is available in the Bruckner Archive and Bruckner Society CD BSVD-216.

In 1995 Wolfgang Grandjean edited the earlier Adagio and Scherzo as a study score (I/1a-STP). For performance purposes, Grandjean filled in the missing bars of the Adagio using the corresponding musical material in the 1866 score (Doblinger 74 014).

In his transcription for chamber orchestra, Ricardo Luna completed the five missing bars of the recapitulation of the Adagio by using the corresponding material of the Linz version. Because the music of the preceding seven incomplete bars (with only melodic elements) is not identical to that of the Linz version, he had to make some adjustments to arrange the rhythms where they were not given in the accompanying voices.
An electronic recreation of the early Adagio and Scherzo by Joan Schukking can be heard and downloaded at John Berky's website.

=== Linz version, 1866–1868 ===
The first version of the symphony was written in 1866 by Bruckner in Linz.

Bruckner made some slight adjustments to the score for the 1868 premiere. A score was first published in 1998 by William Carragan, using Haas's critical report, and recorded that same year by Georg Tintner in Glasgow. The premiere version has been issued by Thomas Röder in the new edition of the Bruckner Gesamtausgabe and has been premiered by the Vienna Radio Symphony Orchestra under Cornelius Meister during the 2014 Salzburger Festspiele. The first American performance using Röder's edition, played by the Sam Houston State University Orchestra in 2016 with Jacob Sustaita conducting, can be heard and downloaded at John Berky's website.

=== Revised Linz version, 1877/1884 ===
Although routinely referred to as the “Linz version” and as having been made in 1866, this version, the most frequently performed version of the work, was prepared neither in Linz nor in that year. It was made in 1877 in Vienna and slightly revised there in 1884. It is available in editions by Robert Haas (published 1935) and Leopold Nowak (1953).

=== Vienna version, 1891 ===
The Vienna version, which differs considerably from the earlier 1866 and 1877 versions, is available in an edition by Günter Brosche, published in 1980 as part of the Gesamtausgabe.

== Editions ==
Doblinger, 1893
This was the first published edition. Edited by Doblinger under the supervision of Cyrill Hynais, it had few differences from the 1891 version. It has been recorded by F. Charles Adler, Volkmar Andreae and Fritz Zaun (scherzo only).
Haas, 1935
Of the (revised, 1877) "Linz version" and (1891) "Vienna version" in the earlier Gesamtausgabe.
Nowak, 1953
Of the (revised, 1877) "Linz version", again under Gesamtausgabe auspices.
Brosche, 1980
Of the (1891) "Vienna version", again as part of the Gesamtausgabe.
Röder, 2016
Of the 1868 version, as part of the new Bruckner Gesamtausgabe

== Instrumentation ==
The score calls for two flutes, two oboes, two clarinets, two bassoons, four horns, two trumpets, three trombones, timpani, and strings, with an extra flute in the Adagio.

== Discography ==
The first recording of any part of the work was made in 1934 by Fritz Zaun and the Berlin State Opera Orchestra; it included only the Scherzo, in the 1893 first published edition. The first complete commercial recording of the symphony came in 1950, with Volkmar Andreae conducting the Lower Austrian Tonkünstler Orchestra, again using the first published edition.

=== Early drafts ===
Available recordings:

- Ricardo Luna, Bruckner unknown – CD Preiser Records PR 91250, 2013 – transcription for chamber orchestra
- Markus Poschner, Bruckner Orchestra Linz – CD Capriccio C8094, 2024 – Symphony No. 1 (1891 version) and 1865 Scherzo

=== Linz version, 1866–1868 ===
- Georg Tintner conducting the Royal Scottish National Orchestra, studio recording, Naxos, 1998 (Carragan ed.)
- Gerd Schaller conducting the Philharmonie Festiva, live recording, Profil PH 12022, 2011 (Carragan ed.)
- Christian Thielemann conducting the Staatskapelle Dresden – Unitel BD LC15762, 2018 (Röder ed.)

=== Revised Linz version, 1877/1884 ===
Haas edition

- Georg-Ludwig Jochum conducting the RIAS Symphony Orchestra, live performance, Tahra, 1956
- Wolfgang Sawallisch conducting the Bayerisches Staatsorchester München, Orfeo, 1984
- Takashi Asahina conducting the Osaka Philharmonic, Canyon, 1994
- Georg Solti conducting the Chicago Symphony Orchestra, Decca, 1995

Nowak edition

- Eugen Jochum conducting the Berliner Philharmoniker, Deutsche Grammophon, 1966
- Eugen Jochum conducting the Dresden Staatskapelle, EMI, 1978
- Daniel Barenboim conducting the Chicago Symphony Orchestra, DG, 1980 – with the Te Deum.
- Herbert von Karajan conducting the Berliner Philharmoniker, Deutsche Grammophon, 1981
- Eliahu Inbal conducting the Frankfurt Radio Symphony, Teldec, 1987
- Stanisław Skrowaczewski conducting the Saarbrücken Radio Symphony Orchestra, Oehms, 1995
- Simone Young conducting the Hamburg Philharmonic, live recording, Oehms OC 633, 2010
- Marek Janowski conducting the Orchestre de la Suisse Romande, Pentatone, 2012

=== Vienna version, 1891 ===
Doblinger edition

- Volkmar Andreae conducting the Austria State Symphony Orchestra, Forgotten Records, 1950
- F. Charles Adler conducting the Vienna Orchestra Society, Forgotten Records, 1955
- Hun-Joung Lim conducting the Korean Symphony Orchestra], Decca, 2015

Brosche edition

- Günter Wand conducting the Cologne Radio Symphony Orchestra, EMI, 1981
- Riccardo Chailly conducting the Radio-Symphonie-Orchester Berlin, London/Decca CD 475 331–2, 1987
- Leon Botstein conducting the American Symphony Orchestra, American Symphony Download, 2003
- Claudio Abbado conducting the Lucerne Festival Orchestra, ACCENTUS Music, 2012
- Gerd Schaller conducting the Philharmonie Festiva, live recording – Profil PH 19084, 2020
- Andris Nelsons conducting the Gewandhausorcheste Leipzig, Deutsche Grammophon CD 4862083, 2022

== Sources ==
- Anton Bruckner, Sämtliche Werke, Kritische Gesamtausgabe – Band 1: I. Symphonie c-Moll (Wiener und Linzer Fassung), Musikwissenschaftlicher Verlag der internationalen Bruckner-Gesellschaft, Robert Haas (dditor), Vienna, 1935
- Anton Bruckner: Sämtliche Werke: Band I: I. Symphonie c-Moll, Musikwissenschaftlicher Verlag der Internationalen Bruckner-Gesellschaft, Vienna
  - I/1: Linzer Fassung (1866), Leopold Nowak (Editor), 1953
  - I/1A: Adagio ursprüngliche Fassung (1865/66), Fragment – Scherzo ältere Komposition (1865), Wolfgang Grandjean (editor), 1995
  - I/2: Wiener Fassung (1890/91), Günter Brosche (editor), 1980
- Neue Anton Bruckner Gesamtausgabe: Band I/1: Fassung von 1868 "Linzer Fassung", Thomas Röder (editor), Vienna, 2016
- William Carragan. Anton Bruckner – Eleven Symphonies. Bruckner Society of America, Windsor Connecticut, 2020. ISBN 978-1-938911-59-0.
- Joseph C. Kraus, "Phrase rhythm in Bruckner's early orchestral scherzi", Bruckner Studies, edited by Timothy L. Jackson and Paul Hawkshaw, Cambridge University Press, Cambridge, 1997
