= Simone Young =

Australian conductor

Simone Young AM
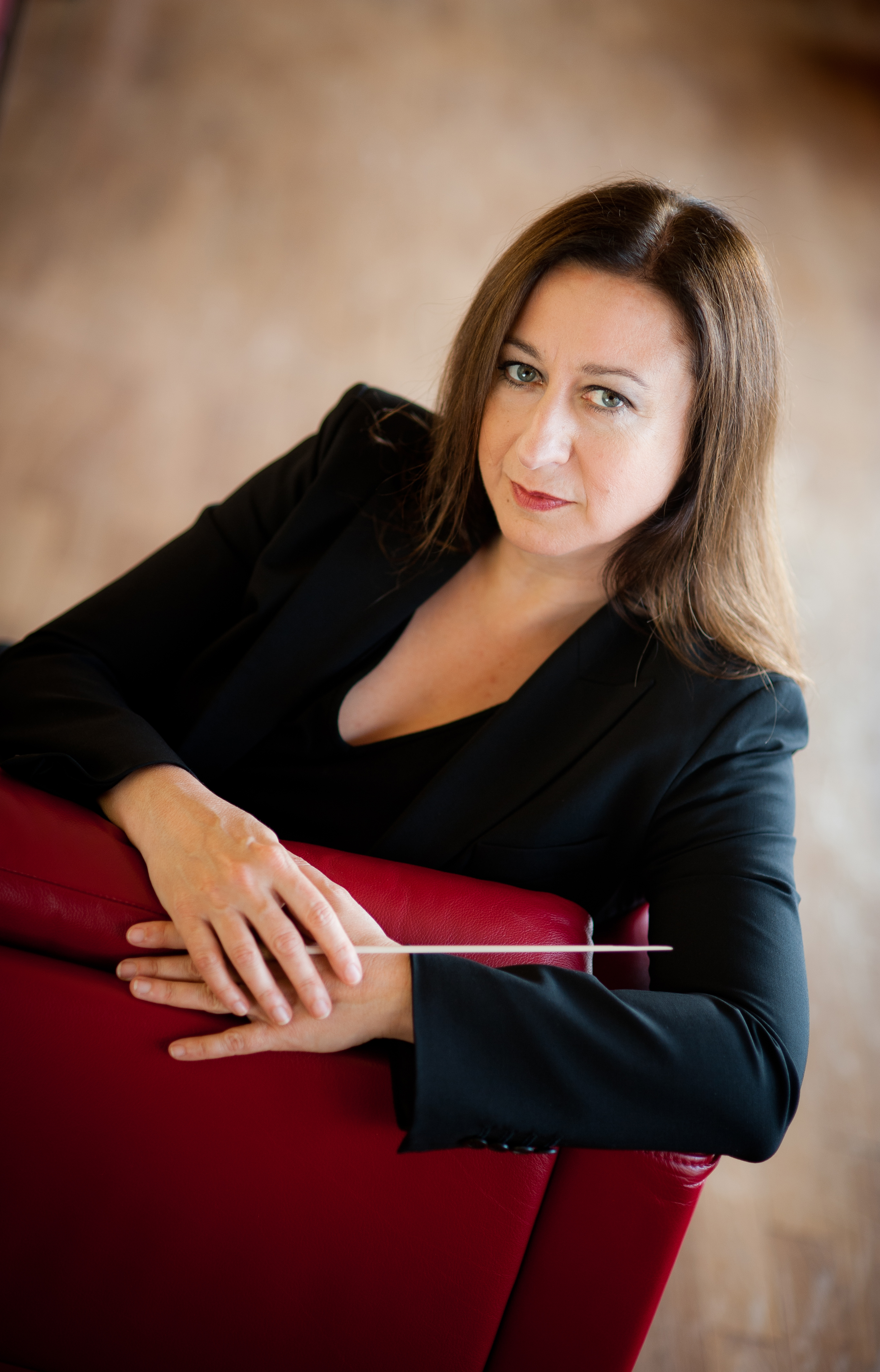
- Young in 2010
- Born: Simone Margaret Young; 2 March 1961 (age 65); Sydney, Australia
- Education: Sydney Conservatorium of Music
- Occupation: Conductor
- Organizations: Opera Australia; Hamburg State Opera; University of Hamburg; Sydney Symphony Orchestra
- Awards: Young Australian of the Year; Ordre des Arts et des Lettres; Order of Australia

Simone Margaret Young AM (born 2 March 1961) is an Australian conductor and academic teacher. She is currently chief conductor of the Sydney Symphony Orchestra.

== Biography and career ==
Young was born in Sydney, of Irish ancestry on her father's side and Croatian ancestry on her mother's. Young was educated at the Monte Sant'Angelo Mercy College in North Sydney. She studied composition, piano and conducting at the Sydney Conservatorium of Music.

Beginning in 1983, Young worked at Opera Australia as a répétiteur under various conductors, including Charles Mackerras, Richard Bonynge, Carlo Felice Cillario and Stuart Challender. Young started her operatic conducting career at the Sydney Opera House in 1985. In 1986 she was the first woman and youngest person to be appointed a resident conductor with Opera Australia. She received an Australia Council grant to study overseas, and was named Young Australian of the Year. In her early years, she was assistant to James Conlon, and Kapellmeister, at the Cologne Opera, and assistant to Daniel Barenboim at the Berlin State Opera and the Bayreuth Festival. From 1998 until 2002, Young was principal conductor of the Bergen Philharmonic Orchestra in Norway.

From 2001 to 2003, Young was chief conductor of Opera Australia in Sydney. Her contract was not renewed after 2003; one reason offered was the expense of her programming ideas.

Young made her first conducting appearance at the Hamburg State Opera in 1996. In May 2003, she was named both chief executive of the Hamburg State Opera and chief conductor of the Philharmoniker Hamburg, posts which she assumed in 2005. In 2006, she became Professor of Music and Theatre at the University of Hamburg. Critics of the magazine Opernwelt selected her in October 2006 as the Dirigentin des Jahres (Conductor of the Year). In December 2011, it was announced that Young would conclude her tenures with both the Hamburg State Opera and the Hamburg Philharmonic after the 2014/2015 season.

Young was the first female conductor at the Vienna State Opera in 1993. She conducted the Sydney Symphony Orchestra when they performed Elena Kats-Chernin's "Deep Sea Dreaming" at the 2000 Summer Olympics opening ceremony in Sydney. In November 2005, she was the first female conductor to conduct the Vienna Philharmonic. Her discography includes the complete symphonies of Anton Bruckner and the complete Ring Cycle of Richard Wagner, where she was the first female conductor to have recorded either of these cycles. She has also recorded the complete cycle of Brahms' symphonies.

In August 2008, Young appeared as part of the judging panel in the reality TV talent show-themed program Maestro on BBC Two. In December 2012, she was voted Limelight magazine's Music Personality of the Year. In 2022, Young was that magazine's critic's choice as Australian Artist of the Year.

In 2013, in commemoration of the bicentenaries for Richard Wagner and for Giuseppe Verdi, Young conducted the entire 'Bayreuth canon' of ten Wagner operas at a festival entitled Wagner-Wahn (Wagner Madness) in Hamburg, along with three rarely performed Verdi operas as a trilogy in September to November – La battaglia di Legnano, I due Foscari, I Lombardi alla prima crociata. In March 2016, Young was appointed a member of the board of the Europäische Musiktheater-Akademie (European Academy of Music Theatre).

Young had first guest-conducted the Sydney Symphony Orchestra (SSO) in 1996. In December 2019, the SSO announced the appointment of Young as its next chief conductor, effective in 2022, with an initial contract of 3 years. Young is the first female conductor to be named chief conductor of the SSO. In February 2024, the SSO announced the extension of Young's contract as its chief conductor through the end of 2026. In September 2025 her contract was extended to late 2029.

In 2024 Simone Young became the first woman to conduct Der Ring des Nibelungen at the Bayreuth Festival.

In 2025 she was ranked the 10th busiest performer in Europe and North America according to the Bachtrack’s Classical Music Statistics 2025 list.

== Personal life ==
Young is married to Greg Condon, and has two daughters. She made her first appearance at the Metropolitan Opera while she was five months pregnant and conducted at the Vienna State Opera one month prior to giving birth in 1997.

== Media, honours and awards ==
Young is featured in the documentary film Knowing the Score directed by Australian documentarian Janine Hosking, a biopic that "is first and foremost a captivating story of a dazzling 30-year music career."

Young has received honorary doctorates from the universities of New South Wales, Sydney and Melbourne. She has been appointed an (AM) "for service to the arts as a conductor with major opera companies and orchestras in Australia and internationally".

In 2021 Young was named the Advance Awards Global Icon.

=== ARIA Music Awards ===
The ARIA Music Awards is an annual awards ceremony that recognises excellence, innovation, and achievement across all genres of Australian music. They commenced in 1987.

Year	Nominee / work	Award	Result	Ref.
2002	Verdi: Requiem (with Opera Australia)	Best Original Cast or Show Album	Nominated	
2025	Mahler: Symphony No. 2 / Barton: Of the Earth (with Sydney Symphony Orchestra)	Best Classical Album	Nominated	
2026	Mahler: Symphony No. 3 (with Sydney Symphony Orchestra)	Best Classical Album	Nominated	

=== Bernard Heinze Memorial Award ===
The Sir Bernard Heinze Memorial Award is given to a person who has made an outstanding contribution to music in Australia.

Year	Nominee / work	Award	Result	Ref.
2010	Simone Young	Sir Bernard Heinze Memorial Award	awarded	

=== Helpmann Awards ===
The Helpmann Awards is an awards show, celebrating live entertainment and performing arts in Australia, presented by industry group Live Performance Australia since 2001. Note: 2020 and 2021 were cancelled due to the COVID-19 pandemic.

Year	Nominee / work	Award	Result	Ref.
2001	Simone Young – Simon Boccanegra	Best Musical Direction	Nominated	
2002	Simone Young – Andrea Chénier	Best Music Direction	Won	
2002	Simone Young – Tristan und Isolde	Best Music Direction	Nominated	
2004	Simone Young – Lulu	Best Music Direction	Nominated	
2005	Simone Young – Simone Young Conducts Mahler	Best Performance in a Classical Concert	Won	
2008	Simone Young – Turangalîla-Symphonie	Best Performance in a Classical Concert	Nominated	
2013	Simone Young conducting the Hamburg Philharmonic – The Resurrection Symphony	Best Individual Classical Performance	Won	
2018	Simone Young Conducts the Sydney Symphony Orchestra – Beethoven and Bruckner	Best Symphony Orchestra Concert	Nominated	

=== Mo Awards ===
The Australian Entertainment Mo Awards (commonly known informally as the Mo Awards), were annual Australian entertainment industry awards. They recognise achievements in live entertainment in Australia from 1975 to 2016. Simone Young won one award in that time.

Year	Nominee / work	Award	Result (wins only)
1995	Simone Young	Classical Performance of the Year	Won

=== Victorian Honour Roll of Women ===
The Victorian Honour Roll of Women was established in 2001 to recognise the achievements of women from the Australian state of Victoria.

Year	Nominee / work	Award	Result
2001	Simone Young	Victorian Honour Roll of Women	awarded

=== International Opera Awards ===
Year	Nominee / work	Award	Result (wins only)
2024	Simone Young	Conductor of the Year	Won

== Selected discography ==
DVD

- Simone Young: To Hamburg from Downunder, documentary, directed by Ralf Pleger, Ovation, (2008)
- Poulenc: Dialogues of the Carmelites, Hamburg State Opera, Arthaus Musik (2008)
- Pfitzner: Palestrina, Bavarian State Orchestra, EuroArts (2010)
- Reimann: Lear, Staatsoper Hamburg, Arthaus Musik (2015)

CD

- Halévy: La Juive, Vienna State Opera, RCA (2002)
- Wagner: Tenor Arias, Johan Botha (tenor), Vienna Radio Symphony Orchestra, Oehms Classics (2004)
- Bürger: Stille der Nacht, Berlin Radio Symphony Orchestra, Toccata Classics (2006)
- Hindemith: Mathis der Maler, Philharmoniker Hamburg, Oehms Classics (2007)
- Britten: Folksong Arrangements, Steve Davislim (tenor), Simone Young (piano), Melba (2007)
- Bruckner: Symphony No. 2, Philharmoniker Hamburg, Oehms Classics (2007)
- Verdi: Requiem, Australian Opera and Ballet Orchestra, ABC Classics, (2007)
- Wagner, Strauss: Transcendent Love: The Passions of Wagner and Strauss, Lisa Gasteen (soprano), West Australian Symphony Orchestra, ABC Classics (2008)
- Dean: Brett Dean, Composer and Performer, Brett Dean (viola), cellos of the Sydney Symphony Orchestra, Bis (2008)
- Wagner: Das Rheingold, Philharmoniker Hamburg, Oehms Classics (2008)
- Bruckner: Symphony No. 3, Philharmoniker Hamburg, Oehms Classics (2008)
- Wagner, Verdi, Mozart: Knut Skram, Opera Arias, Knut Skram (baritone), Royal Philharmonic Orchestra, Simax (2008)
- Wagner: Die Walküre, Philharmoniker Hamburg, Oehms Classics (2009)
- Bruckner: Symphony No. 8, Philharmoniker Hamburg, Oehms Classics (2009)
- Brahms: Symphony No. 1, Philharmoniker Hamburg, Oehms Classics (2010)
- Bruckner: Symphony No. 4 – Romantic (1874 version), Philharmoniker Hamburg, Oehms Classics (2010)
- Strauss: Seduction: Songs by Richard Strauss, Steve Davislim (tenor), Orchestra Victoria, Melba Recordings (2010)
- Wagner: Siegfried, Philharmoniker Hamburg, Oehms Classics (2011)
- Wagner: Götterdämmerung, Philharmoniker Hamburg, Oehms Classics (2011)
- Mahler: Symphony No. 2, Philharmoniker Hamburg, Oehms Classics (2012)
- Mahler: Symphony No. 6, Philharmoniker Hamburg, Oehms Classics (2012)
- Brahms: Symphony No. 2, Philharmoniker Hamburg, Oehms Classics (2012)
- Wagner: Der Ring des Nibelungen, box set, Philharmoniker Hamburg, Oehms Classics (2012)
- Bruckner: Symphony No. 0, Philharmoniker Hamburg, Oehms Classics (2013)
- Brahms: Symphony No. 3 & No. 4, Philharmoniker Hamburg, Oehms Classics (2013)
- Bruckner: Study Symphony in F minor, Philharmoniker Hamburg, Oehms Classics (2014)
- Bruckner: Symphony No. 5 in B-flat Major, Philharmoniker Hamburg, Oehms Classics (2015)
- Bruckner: Symphony No. 6, Philharmoniker Hamburg, Oehms Classics (2015)
- Bruckner: Symphony No. 7, Philharmoniker Hamburg, Oehms Classics (2015)
- Bruckner: Symphony No. 9, Philharmoniker Hamburg, Oehms Classics (2015)
- Schmidt: The Book with Seven Seals, Philharmoniker Hamburg, NDR Chor, Staatschor Latvija, Oehms Classics (2016)
- Bruckner: Complete Symphonies, box set, Philharmoniker Hamburg, Oehms Classics (2016)
- Brahms: Symphonies No. 1–4, 3-CD set, Philharmoniker Hamburg, Oehms Classics (2017)
- Lang: ParZeFool, Klangforum Wien, Arnold Schoenberg Chor, Kairos (2019)

== Bibliography ==
- Pleger, Ralf (2006). Simone Young: die Dirigentin (in German). Hamburg: Europäische Verlagsanstalt. ISBN 978-3-434-50599-0.

Cultural offices
Preceded by Dmitri Kitayenko	Principal Conductor, Bergen Philharmonic Orchestra; 1998–2002	Succeeded by Andrew Litton
Preceded by Richard Bonynge	Music Director, Opera Australia; 2001–2003	Succeeded by Richard Hickox
Preceded by Ingo Metzmacher	Music Director, Hamburg State Opera; 2005–2015	Succeeded by Kent Nagano
