= William Carragan =

American musicologist (1937–2024)

- Born: July 18, 1937; Troy, New York, U.S.
- Died: June 9, 2024 (aged 86); Troy, New York, U.S.
- Occupation: Musicologist
- Years active: 1977–2024
- Known for: Editions of Bruckner symphonies
- Website: carragan.com

William Carragan (July 18, 1937 – June 9, 2024) was an American musicologist particularly known for his research into the music of Anton Bruckner. He spent many years producing a completion of Bruckner's Ninth Symphony.

== Education and career in physics ==
Born in Troy, New York, Carragan learned physics from his father George Howard Carragan (1896–1982, a physics professor) and music from his mother Martha Beck (1900–1997, a pianist and composer of educational pieces for children who knew Sergei Rachmaninoff). He also took piano lessons with Albany pianist Stanley Hummel (1908–2005), and later further piano lessons with Gilbert Kalish, also studying harpsichord with Louis Bagger.

But following his father he became a physicist and professor at Hudson Valley Community College for 35 years, from 1965 until 2001. While there he published a comprehensive four-volume textbook of introductory university physics.

== Bruckner Editions ==
As a musicologist, Carragan's primary concerns were analytical aspects of the music, and history, of the performances of Bruckner's symphonies. He was a contributing editor of the Bruckner Collected Edition in Vienna, sponsored by the International Bruckner Society. For the Collected Edition, at the request of Leopold Nowak, Carragan prepared a new edition of Bruckner's Second Symphony in two versions (1872 and 1877), as well as the 1883 and 1886 variants of the Symphony.

Carragan reconstructed for the first time the first version of Bruckner's First (1866), the previously unheard versions of the Third from 1874 and 1876, and of the Fourth from 1878, as well as the 1888 intermediate versions of the Eighth. He also devoted himself to completing Bruckner's Ninth symphony. That completion has been widely performed and recorded, the most recently in a revised version from 2017.

Carragan published Anton Bruckner: Eleven Symphonies – a "Red Book" on the different versions of Bruckner's Symphonies issued by the Bruckner Society of America. He served as consultant in many performances of Bruckner symphonies. In 1991 he was accorded the Gold-Plakette of the Brucknerbund Oberösterreich, and in 2010 he was awarded the Kilenyi Medal of Honor of the Bruckner Society of America.

== Other work ==
For the Franz Schubert anniversary of 1978, Carragan completed and performed several of Schubert's unfinished piano sonatas, and ten years later he prepared a four-movement version of the Schubert's Eighth symphony which was recorded in Germany with the Philharmonie Festiva.

With respect to the baroque era, Carragan made arrangements of a concerto for four violins by Antonio Vivaldi, Op. 3, no. 1, for four harpsichords, as well as a concerto for two violins, Op. 3, no. 8, arranged after J.S. Bach for two harpsichords.

== Personal life and death ==
Carragan married Julia Weston Faunce in April 1966. She was a teacher and medieval historian who also taught at Hudson Valley College for 34 years. He retired in 2000 to care for his wife, who died of cancer in 2001. For the last two decades of his life he lived in the Brunswick home of his childhood. He was also a cantor at Saint George Antiochian Orthodox Church in Albany, NY.

Carragan died following a stroke on June 9, 2024, at the age of 86.

== Discography of the Carragan Editions ==
=== Bruckner's Symphonies ===
==== Symphony No. 1 (Linz version, 1866–1868) ====
- Gerd Schaller, Philharmonie Festiva – Profil PH 12022

==== Symphony No. 2 (First version, 1872) ====
- Kurt Eichhorn, Bruckner Orchestra Linz – Camerata 30CM-195
- Gerd Schaller, Philharmonie Festiva, Profil PH 12022

1873 variant
- Kurt Eichhorn, Bruckner Orchestra Linz – Camerata 30CM-196
1876 variant
- Kurt Eichhorn, Bruckner Orchestra Linz – abruckner.com BSVD-0103

NB: composite recording prepared in 2007 by William Carragan and John Berky

==== Symphony No. 3 (First version, 1873) ====
1874 variant
- Gerd Schaller, Philharmonie Festiva - Profil PH 12022

==== Symphony No. 8 (1888 variants) ====
- Gerd Schaller, Philharmonie Festiva - Profil PH 13027

==== Symphony No. 9 – Completion of the Finale ====
- Original edition of 1981-83: Yoav Talmi, Oslo Philharmonic Orchestra – Chandos 7051/2
- 2003 Revision: Jason Klein, Saratoga Symphony Orchestra – Orchestra CD OSR 03-1
- 2006 Revision: Akyra Naito, Tokyo New City Orchestra – Delta Classics DCCA-0032
- 2010 Revision: Gerd Schaller, Philharmonie Festiva – Profil PH 11028

=== Schubert's Symphony No. 8 "Unfinished", D. 759 ===
- Gerd Schaller, Philharmonie Festiva, Schubert – Late Symphonies – Profil PH 12062
