= International Bruckner Society =

The International Bruckner Society (German Internationale Bruckner-Gesellschaft) was an organization which began its existence in 1927 in Leipzig and was officially founded in 1929 in Vienna. Its main purpose since then has been to publish editions of the music of Anton Bruckner. Most of Bruckner's music had been published during the composer's lifetime or shortly after his death, but often in versions that incorporated numerous changes suggested by his friends and students. In the case of Bruckner's unfinished Ninth Symphony, Bruckner student Ferdinand Loewe made several unauthorized changes even after Bruckner's death. The mission of the International Bruckner Society was to publish versions of Bruckner's works based directly on the original manuscripts, which the composer had bequeathed to the Austrian National Library.

The Society hired Robert Haas as General Editor, with Alfred Orel as his assistant. The first publication was Orel's critical edition of the Ninth Symphony, published in 1934 but premiered two years earlier in 1932 in a concert by Siegmund von Hausegger conducting the Munich Philharmonic Orchestra. In this concert the Ninth Symphony was performed twice: once in the Loewe edition and again in the new Orel edition, and its success provided much impetus for a complete critical edition of Bruckner's work.

Between 1935 and 1944 Haas published editions of all the remaining numbered symphonies except for the Third (Haas's work on this symphony was destroyed in a wartime incident). In several cases, multiple revisions of a single symphony existed in the manuscripts, and Haas did not hesitate to combine material from different versions to produce what he considered an "ideal" version for publication (even though it did not correspond to anything actually written by the composer).

The Society had officially been dissolved in 1938 immediately after the Anschluss (although publication of the complete edition continued from Leipzig). After World War II the Society was refounded in Vienna. Haas was fired because of his Nazi connections and publication resumed under a new General Editor: Leopold Nowak. The first post-war publication was a critical edition of the Third Symphony, edited by Fritz Oeser. Nowak continued as General Editor until 1989, by which time the Society had published multiple versions of the symphonies and also numerous other works by Bruckner. Nowak was a more scholarly and less creative editor than Haas: he saw his task as reproducing all the different versions that Bruckner wrote on the basis of the manuscript and printed sources, and documenting all the differences in great detail. The post-war Nowak editions became more commonly performed and recorded than the pre-war Haas versions, although a significant number of conductors continued to prefer Haas.

The Society continued to produce new editions of Bruckner's works after Nowak stepped down. It also sponsors periodicals and scholarship dedicated to Bruckner.
