= Symphony No. 5 (Bruckner) =

Self styled "fantastic", premiered in 1894

- by Anton Bruckner
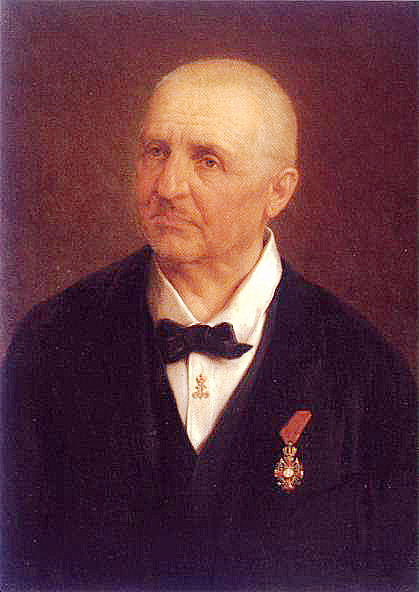
- Portrait of Anton Bruckner
- Other name: Tragic; Church of Faith; Pizzicato; Fantastic
- Key: B♭ major
- Catalogue: WAB 105
- Composed: 1875–76; 1877–78
- Dedication: Karl von Stremayr
- Published: 1896: 1896 (ed. Schalk); 1935 (ed. Robert Haas); 1951 (ed. Leopold Nowak)
- Recorded: 1937
- Movements: 4

Premiere
- Date: 8 April 1894
- Location: Graz
- Conductor: Franz Schalk

Anton Bruckner's Symphony No. 5 in B♭ major, WAB 105, was written in 1875–1876, with minor changes over the next two years. It came at a time of trouble and disillusion for the composer: a lawsuit, from which he was exonerated, and a reduction in salary. Dedicated to Karl von Stremayr, education minister in the Austro-Hungarian Empire, the symphony has at times been nicknamed the "Tragic", the "Church of Faith" or the "Pizzicato"; Bruckner himself referred to it as the "Fantastic" without applying this or any other name formally.

== First performances ==
The Fifth was first performed in public on two pianos by Joseph Schalk and Franz Zottmann on 20 April 1887 in the Bösendorfersaal in Vienna. The first orchestral performance – in the inauthentic "Schalk version", with a changed orchestration in Wagnerian fashion and omitting 122 bars of the finale – was conducted by Franz Schalk in Graz on 8 April 1894. Bruckner, who died two years later, was sick and unable to attend. He never heard this symphony performed by an orchestra.

== Instrumentation ==
The score calls for two flutes, two oboes, two clarinets, two bassoons, four horns, three trumpets, three trombones and one bass tuba along with timpani and strings. The tuba was added in 1878 (the same year Bruckner added one to his Fourth Symphony). See versions below.

== Structure ==
The symphony is not outwardly a work of storm and stress, but it is a piece of "working out", one of Bruckner's most contrapuntally intricate works. There are four movements; that the climax comes unusually late, in the chorale at the end of the last movement, poses a huge interpretive challenge:

1. Introduction: Adagio – Allegro (B♭ major)
2. Adagio: Sehr langsam (D minor)
3. Scherzo: Molto vivace (D minor)
4. Finale: Adagio – Allegro moderato (B♭ major)

All but the third movement begin with pizzicato strings, hence the above-mentioned nickname. The pizzicato figures are symmetrical in the sense that the outer movements share one figure while the middle movements share another.

=== Jochum's thoughts ===
Noted Bruckner conductor Eugen Jochum wrote in detail about the symphony's interpretive challenges, noting that, in contrast to the Seventh Symphony, "the climax... is not merely in the last movement but at the very end, in the chorale. ... The first, second and third movements seem almost a... vast preparation. ... The preparatory character applies especially to the first movement [whose] introduction ... is a large-scale foundation... destined to bear the weight of all four movements." As evidence, he detailed the way the introduction's thematic materials function in later movements, and said the interpreter "must direct everything towards the Finale and its ending... and continually keep something in reserve for the conclusion."

Jochum also discussed the choice of tempo, and its relationships and modifications, as an element in achieving overall direction and unity throughout the symphony, regarding the quarter notes in the first-movement introduction as "the fundamental tempo". Also, he wrote that in the Finale's double fugue, "it is not enough to bring out themes as such [because] subsidiary parts would be too loud." To get the desired contrapuntal clarity, he detailed dynamic subtleties required. Jochum ascribed elements of Bruckner's orchestration, as well as his precise indications of articulation, to his familiarity with the organ.

=== First movement ===
The work begins with a majestic slow introduction which, although beginning in B♭ major, traverses several keys:

This is the only one of Bruckner's symphonies to begin with a slow introduction, but all the others, except Symphony No. 1, begin with sections that are like introductions in tempo, easing into the main material, like the opening of Beethoven's Ninth. It eventually leans heavily toward D major without actually tonicizing it. The introduction progresses into a main movement in sonata form. After a climax in A major, the texture is thinned until only a violin tremolo remains. This tremolo, starts on A, then moves to D, suggesting that D will become a tonal focal point. Instead, the opening theme is in B♭ minor:

Like much of Bruckner's music, this movement's exposition contains three main key regions instead of the usual two. The second theme group is in F minor, and comprises a small ternary form, with sections in F minor, D♭ major, and F minor:

Bruckner introduces the third theme in an unprepared tonality (D♭ major):

In the recapitulation, the themes' tonality progresses from B♭ minor to G minor to E♭ major. The coda begins in B♭ minor, but eventually shifts to the parallel major mode.

=== Second movement ===
The main material of the Adagio and Scherzo movements is similar, although heard of course at different tempos and launching different developments. The Adagio primarily relies upon the alternation of two thematic sections, the first of which contains a metrical superimposition of six against four:

The second features a chorale on the strings:

=== Third movement ===
The Scherzo of this symphony is unique in all of Bruckner's scherzi; the scherzo is in a three-theme sonata form instead of the usual binary form. The movement opens at a high tempo before slowing down for the second theme (note the bassline is the same as the one that opens the Adagio):

The second theme is in a slower tempo:

Before the third theme appears, the tempo is raised with an accelerando. After this, the scherzo goes through its development and recapitulation, setting the stage for the trio:

Jochum on the significance of the staccato arrowhead marking in the Scherzo: "the staccati must be very short, like a tapping. There must be something eerie about the whole. At the second tempo marking ("significantly slower"), a really high-spirited Upper Austrian peasant dance strikes up: here the crotchets marked with an arrow-head should be rather short and playfully marked, each note given a slight accent. In the Trio, too, especially in the piano section, the accents must be brief, light, and effervescent. The arrow-heads indicate actual staccati here: the quavers [eighth notes] on flutes and first violins before Letter A must be very light, dainty, and short. On the other hand, in the cello and double bass descent directly after Letter A, the arrow-heads signify a rounded line, and the notes marked with such must sound with audible vibrato and not be too short."

=== Fourth movement ===
The long Finale opens in the same way as the first movement but veers off soon to gradually introduce new material which becomes the source of the themes of the Allegro moderato, another sonata form which contains in its course fugal and chorale sections of elaborate counterpoint. The hybridization of sonata form and fugal elements is a hallmark of this movement.

The first theme group is treated as a fugue exposition with the main theme of the movement as its subject:

This is followed by a non-fugal second group based on the second theme of the Scherzo which functions as an episode:

The third theme features prominent descending octaves, a gesture seen in the first theme:

Closing the exposition is a chorale gesture, which recalls the Dresden Amen:

This thematic material is subsequently exploited in the development as the basis for a second fugue subject:

By bar 270, both fugal subjects are intoned concurrently. The simultaneous presentation of the fugal subject also occurs at the beginning of the recapitulation (bar 374). When the recapitulation's third group begins, the first theme from the first movement is also presented; the first-movement material closes the symphony, contributing greatly to its cyclic properties.

== Versions ==
=== 1876 version ===
This remains unpublished. In 1997 a first attempt at reconstruction – by including in the Finale music from the "1876 First Concept" (ed. William Carragan) – was recorded by Shunsaku Tsutsumi with the Shunyukai Symphony Orchestra. In 2008 Takanobu Kawasaki was able to assemble the original concepts (1875–1877) of the symphony from manuscripts Mus.Hs.19.477 and Mus.Hs.3162 at the Austrian National Library; these were recorded by Akira Naito with the Tokyo New City Orchestra. In the opinion of John F. Berky, Naito's recording "is the best available CD to present some of Bruckner's early thoughts for this massive symphony." In this version the symphony is scored without a bass tuba, and more prominence is given to the string instruments. The tempo of the Adagio introductions to Movements 1 and 4, and that of Movement 2, are scored alla breve, i.e. notably faster than in 1878.

=== 1878 version ===
This is the version normally performed. It exists in almost identical editions by Robert Haas (published 1935) and Leopold Nowak (1951). The Nowak has been amended twice, in 1989 (the "Second Revised Edition") and 2005 (the "Third Revised Edition"). All of these are under the auspices of the MWV, the Musikwissenschaftlicher Verlag der Internationalen Bruckner-Gesellschaft in Vienna. Another edition was issued by Benjamin-Gunnar Cohrs for the Anton Bruckner Urtext Gesamtausgabe in 2018. Regardless of edition, the 1878 version is sometimes redundantly called the "Original Version", perhaps to distinguish it from the inauthentic Schalk.

=== Schalk's published edition, 1896 ===
This first published edition, heard at the work's 1894 premiere, was prepared by conductor Franz Schalk. It is unknown how much of its difference from Bruckner's 1878 version reflects Bruckner and how much Schalk, but 15 to 20 minutes of music is cut, and most of the changes were not approved by the composer. Schalk made Bruckner's music sound Wagnerian by means of re-orchestration. Obvious differences occur in the coda of the Finale, where Schalk adds triangle and cymbals and an offstage brass band.

== Discography ==
The first recording of any part of the symphony was made by Dol Dauber with his salon orchestra in 1928 for His Master's Voice; it included only the Scherzo, in an arrangement of the Schalk edition. The first of the complete work was made by Karl Böhm with the Dresden Staatskapelle in 1937 using the new Haas edition. (Böhm never returned to this music.)

Jochum, in addition to broadcasts issued on CD, made four commercial recordings: the Haas edition in 1938 with the Hamburg Philharmonic for Telefunken; and the Nowak edition in 1958 with the Bavarian Radio Symphony Orchestra for Deutsche Grammophon, in 1964 with the Concertgebouworkest for Philips, and in 1980 with the Dresden Staatskapelle for EMI. Conductor Kenneth Woods in his essay on Jochum quotes Herbert Glass: "the Fifth drove [Jochum] to distraction and he would regard his every performance of it as an interpretation-in-progress. In rehearsal, such doubts could sorely test an orchestra's patience – this despite his courtly, respectful treatment of his players."

Also noteworthy is Bernard Haitink, who recorded the symphony commercially three times. In 1971 he recorded the Haas edition with the Concertgebouworkest for Philips. In 1988 he returned to the Haas edition, this time with the Vienna Philharmonic. Then, in 2010 he recorded the Nowak edition with the Bavarian Radio Symphony Orchestra for BR Klassik; this recording has won particular esteem.

Sergiu Celibidache, Herbert von Karajan, Stanisław Skrowaczewski, Herbert Blomstedt and Daniel Barenboim are among other noted contributors to the Bruckner Fifth discography. Takashi Asahina, Japan's most-recorded musician, recorded the Bruckner Fifth numerous times. Norman Lebrecht has singled out Georg Tintner's recording on Naxos Records as one of the 100 best discs of the century and credits it with changing critics' attitude towards that record label: "It actually sounds as if Tintner had been waiting all of his life to give this performance."

Schalk edition

As above-mentioned, Dol Dauber's recording was of the Scherzo alone. A few recordings of this complete edition are by Hans Knappertsbusch (twice), Richard Burgin, Takeo Noguchi, Leon Botstein and recent recordings by Gennadi Rozhdestvensky, Warren Cohen and Hun-Joung Lim. In his recording with the Czech Philharmonic Orchestra (Supraphon, 1973), Lovro von Matačić used a version which combined elements of the Nowak and Schalk versions. All other recordings are of 1878 version in either the Haas or one of the Nowak editions.

=== Selection of recordings ===
- Karl Böhm, Dresden Staatskapelle, 1937 – Electrola DB 4486–4494
- Eugen Jochum, Hamburg Philharmonic, 1938 – Telefunken E 2672/80
- Wilhelm Furtwängler, Berlin Philharmonic, live 1942 – Deutsche Grammophon 427 774–2
- Herbert von Karajan, Vienna Symphony Orchestra, live 1954 – Orfeo C 231 901 A
- Hans Knappertsbusch, Vienna Philharmonic, 1956 – Decca SMB 25039
- Eugen Jochum, Bavarian Radio Symphony Orch., 1958 – Deutsche Grammophon SLPM 138 004
- Eduard van Beinum, Concertgebouw Orchestra, 1959 – Philips 456 249–2
- Hans Knappertsbusch, Munich Philharmonic, live 1959 – Frequenz 051-038
- Eugen Jochum, Concertgebouw Orchestra, live at Ottobeuren 1964 – Philips 6700 028
- Otto Klemperer, New Philharmonia Orchestra, 1967 – Columbia SAX 5288/9
- Herbert von Karajan, Vienna Philharmonic, live in Salzburg 1969 – Andante AND 2060
- Bernard Haitink, Concertgebouw Orchestra, 1971 – Philips 6725 021
- Günter Wand, Kölner Rundfunk-Sinfonie-Orchester, live 1974 – DHM 1C 153 19 9670-3
- Herbert von Karajan, Berlin Philharmonic, 1976 – Deutsche Grammophon 2707 101
- Daniel Barenboim, Chicago Symphony Orchestra, 1977 – Deutsche Grammophon 2707 113
- Eugen Jochum, Dresden Staatskapelle, 1980 – EMI CZS 7 62935-2
- Georg Solti, Chicago Symphony Orchestra, 1980 – Decca D221D-2
- Sergiu Celibidache, RSO Stuttgart, live 1981 – Deutsche Grammophon 459 666–2
- Eugen Jochum, Concertgebouw Orchestra, live 1986 – Tahra 247
- Bernard Haitink, Vienna Philharmonic, 1988 – Philips 422 342–2
- Günter Wand, NDR Sinfonieorchester, live 1989 – RCA RD 60361
- Kurt Eichhorn, Bavarian Radio Symphony Orch., live at St Florian 1990 – Capriccio 10 609
- Daniel Barenboim, Berlin Philharmonic, 1991 – Teldec 9031 73271-2
- Riccardo Chailly, Royal Concertgebouw Orchestra, 1991 – Decca 433 819–2
- Wolfgang Sawallisch, Bavarian State Orchestra, 1991 – Orfeo C241911A
- Günter Wand, Deutsches Symphonie-Orchester Berlin, live 1991 – Profil Hänssler PH 09042
- Claudio Abbado, Vienna Philharmonic, live 1993 – Deutsche Grammophon 445 879–2
- Sergiu Celibidache, Munich Philharmonic, live 1993 – EMI 7243 5 56691 2–4
- Takashi Asahina – Osaka Philharmonic, live 1998 – Tokyo FM – TFMC-0005
- Takeo Noguchi, Furtwängler Institute Philharmonic Tokyo, live 1996 – Wing WCD 115
- Günter Wand, Berlin Philharmonic, live 1996 – RCA 09026-68503-2
- Stanislaw Skrowaczewski, Saarbrücken Radio Symphony Orchestra, 1996 – Oehms OC 214
- Georg Tintner, Royal Scottish National Orchestra, 1996 – Naxos 8.553452
- Leon Botstein, London Philharmonic, 1998 – Telarc CD 80509
- Giuseppe Sinopoli, Dresden Staatskapelle, live 1999 – Deutsche Grammophon 469 527–2
- Christian Thielemann, Munich Philharmonic, live 2004 – Deutsche Grammophon 477 537–7
- Nikolaus Harnoncourt, Vienna Philharmonic, live 2004 – RCA BVCC 34119
- Dennis Russell Davies, Bruckner-Orchester Linz, 2006 – Arte Nova 88697 74977-2
- Benjamin Zander, Philharmonia Orchestra, 2008 – Telarc 2CD-80706
- Herbert Blomstedt, Gewandhausorchester Leipzig, live 2010 – Querstand VKJK 1230
- Bernard Haitink, Bavarian Radio Symphony Orchestra, live 2010 – BR Klassik SACD 900109
- Claudio Abbado, Lucerne Festival Orchestra, 2011 – Accentus Video ACC 20243
- Gerd Schaller, Philharmonie Festiva, 2013 – Profil Hänssler PH 14020
- Christian Thielemann, Dresden Staatskapelle, 2013 – C Major Video CME 717808
- Nikolaus Harnoncourt, Royal Concertgebouw Orchestra, 2013 – RCO Live Video 14103
- Stanisław Skrowaczewski, London Philharmonic, live 2015 – LPO 0090
- Simone Young, Hamburg Philharmonic, live 2015 – Oehms OC 689
- Gennadi Rozhdestvensky, Yomiuri Nippon Symphony Orchestra, Live 2017 - Altus ALT-411
