= Symphony No. 3 (Bruckner) =

1873 musical work by Anton Bruckner

- by Anton Bruckner
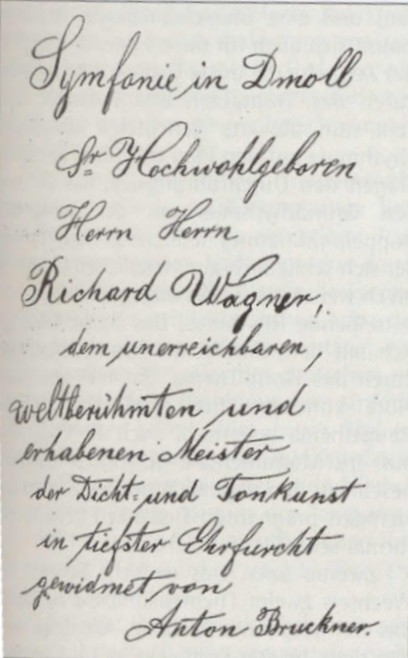
- Dedication to Wagner
- Other name: Wagner Symphony
- Key: D minor
- Catalogue: WAB 103
- Composed: 1872–73; 1876–77; 1889
- Dedication: Richard Wagner
- Published: 1890: 1950 (ed. Fritz Oeser); 1959 (ed. Leopold Nowak) (1889 version); 1977 (ed. Leopold Nowak) (1873 version); 1981 (ed. Leopold Nowak) (1877 version)
- Recorded: 1952 Hans Schmidt-Isserstedt, Berliner Sinfonie-Orchester
- Movements: 4

Premiere
- Date: 16 December 1877
- Location: Vienna
- Conductor: Anton Bruckner

Anton Bruckner's Symphony No. 3 in D minor, WAB 103, was dedicated to Richard Wagner and is sometimes known as his "Wagner Symphony". It was written in 1873, revised in 1877 and again in 1889.

The work has been characterised as "difficult", and is regarded by some as Bruckner's artistic breakthrough. According to Rudolf Kloiber, the third symphony "opens the sequence of Bruckner's masterpieces, in which his creativity meets monumental ability of symphonic construction." The work is notorious as the most-revised of Bruckner's symphonies, and there exist no fewer than six versions, with three of them being widely performed today.

== History ==
Bruckner wrote the first version of the symphony in 1873. In September 1873, before the work was finished, Bruckner visited Richard Wagner, whom he had first met in 1865 at the premiere of Tristan und Isolde in Munich. Bruckner showed both his Second and Third symphonies to Wagner, asking him to pick one he preferred. To Bruckner's delight, Wagner chose the Third, and Bruckner dedicated the symphony to the master he highly respected. After arriving home, Bruckner continued to work on the symphony, finishing the finale on 31 December 1873.

According to an anecdote, Bruckner and Wagner drank so much beer together that, upon arriving home, Bruckner realized he had forgotten which symphony Wagner had chosen. He wrote a letter back to Wagner saying "Symphony in D minor, where the trumpet begins the theme?" Wagner scribbled back "Yes! Best wishes! Richard Wagner." After this, Wagner often referred to Bruckner as "Bruckner the trumpet" and the two became firm friends. In the dedication, Bruckner referred to Wagner as "the unreachable world-famous noble master of poetry and music".

The 1873 version was rehearsed by the Vienna Philharmonic in June or July 1874, but it was not accepted for performance. The premiere of the Symphony (1877 version) was given in Vienna on 16 December 1877. The conductor was meant to be Johann von Herbeck, though his death a month before the concert forced Bruckner himself to step in and conduct. The concert was a complete disaster: although a decent choral conductor, Bruckner was a barely competent orchestral director: the Viennese audience, which was not sympathetic to his work to begin with, gradually left the hall as the music played. Even the orchestra fled at the end, leaving Bruckner alone with a few supporters, including Gustav Mahler. (The score of the first three movements was later owned by Mahler; his widow Alma Mahler ensured she took it with her when fleeing the Nazi invasion of France in 1940 for the United States.)

Stunned by this debacle, Bruckner made several revisions of his work, leaving out significant amounts of music including most quotations from Wagner's Tristan und Isolde and Die Walküre. The original 1873 score was not published until 1977.

== Description ==
The symphony has been described as "heroic" in nature. Bruckner's love for the grand and majestic is reflected especially in the first and last movements. Stark contrasts, cuts and forcefulness mark the signature of the entire composition. The signal-like trumpet theme, heard at the beginning after the two crescendo waves, constitutes a motto for the whole symphony. Many typical elements of his later symphonies, such as the cyclical penetration of all movements and especially the apotheosis at the coda of the finale, which ends with the trumpet theme, are heard in the Third for the first time.

The symphony has four movements. In the first version (1873, 1874-1876 revised) they are:

1. Gemäßigt, misterioso (Moderate, mysterious) — D minor
2. Adagio: Feierlich (Solemn) — E♭ major
3. Scherzo: Ziemlich schnell (Fairly fast) — D minor, ending in D major. Trio in A major
4. Finale: Allegro — D minor, ending in D major

In the second version (1878) Oeser and (1877) Nowak and (1877-1878) they are:

1. Gemäßigt, mehr bewegt, misterioso (Moderate, more animated, mysterious) — D minor
2. Adagio: Bewegt, quasi Andante (With motion, as if Andante) — E♭ major
3. Scherzo: Ziemlich schnell (Fairly fast) — D minor, ending in D major. Trio in A major
4. Finale: Allegro — D minor, ending in D major
1. Gemäßigt, mehr bewegt, misterioso (Moderate, more animated, mysterious) — D minor
2. Andante: Bewegt, feierlich, quasi Adagio (With motion, solemn, as if Adagio) — E♭ major
3. Scherzo: Ziemlich schnell (Fairly fast) — D minor, ending in D major. Trio in A major
4. Finale: Allegro — D minor, ending in D major
1. Gemäßigt, mehr bewegt, misterioso (Moderate, more animated, mysterious) (also Sehr langsam, misterioso) — D minor
2. Adagio: Bewegt, quasi Andante (With motion, as if Andante) — E♭ major
3. Scherzo: Ziemlich schnell (Fairly fast) (also Sehr schnell) — D minor, ending in D major. Trio in A major
4. Finale: Allegro (also Ziemlich schnell) — D minor, ending in D major

In the third version (1889) they are:

1. Mehr langsam, misterioso (More slow, mysterious) (Nowak) / Mäßig Bewegt (Moderately Motion) (Schalk) — D minor
2. Adagio (etwas bewegt), quasi Andante (Something with motion, as if Andante) — E♭ major
3. Scherzo: Ziemlich schnell (Fairly fast) — D minor, ending in D major. Trio in A major
4. Finale: Allegro — D minor, ending in D major

=== First movement ===
The symphony opens with an ostinato on the strings, similarly to the unnumbered Symphony in D minor. Soon after, the trumpet sounds out the main theme:

The music builds to a loud climax and the second theme of the first group is given by the full orchestra:

The music goes back to the string ostinato and the first theme, this time in A major and builds to another loud climax with the second theme. After this first theme group, the second theme group is introduced with a quiet, descending passage played by the strings:

The movement then enters the third theme group. This group alternates between loud and soft and combines two Bruckner hallmarks: octave falls and the Bruckner rhythm:

Following this section, the movement settles into the development. During the development, the main theme is developed through inversion and is the subject of a massive climax near the center of the movement. The secondary group is also developed. In the original version, Bruckner quotes the "sleep motif" from Wagner's Die Walküre right before the recapitulation begins. The recapitulation goes through the theme groups (the first group only has one climax instead of the exposition's two). The movement ends in an unusual fashion: while there is no ambiguity as to the tonic (D), the final "chord" only contains an open fifth of D and A. Since there is no third, the ending is neither major nor minor:

=== Second movement ===
The Adagio opens quietly and has a contrapuntal flair, with the strings playing in four parts:

The second part of the movement shifts to 3/4 time and features a melody played by the violas and accompanied by the violins:

Depending on the version, the second part may not be heard again, as the reprise was cut during the first revision. Near the end of the movement, there are (also depending on the version) one or two quotations from Wagner: one from Die Walküre and another from Tannhäuser that was cut in subsequent revisions.

=== Third movement ===
Third movement (excerpt)
2006 recording by the Frankfurt Radio Symphony directed by Paavo Järvi

The Scherzo begins quietly, quickly building up to a belligerent opening that consists mainly of the notes D and A:

The dainty Trio that follows has the violas and violins in a dialogue:

=== Fourth movement ===
The Finale's main theme is a recall of the main theme of the first movement, by sharing the same rhythm, as shown below:

The second theme group is in a slower tempo and has a somewhat similar delicateness as the Trio of the third movement:

During this theme group there are quotations from Tristan und Isolde and the main motive of the Second Symphony that were cut after the first versions. After this group, the third theme group makes use of syncopated octaves, making it very rhythmic:

The original version has a quotation of Rienzi near the end of the recapitulation. Additionally, the earlier versions feature a "catalogue" of themes from previous movements, similar to the Finale of Beethoven's Ninth Symphony, albeit near the end of the movement rather than the beginning. Eduard Hanslick, one of Bruckner's greatest critics, described the symphony as such: "Bruckner's poetic intentions were not clear to us – perhaps a vision of Beethoven's Ninth becoming friendly with Wagner's Valkyries and finishing up being trampled under their hooves." The catalogue was removed in the final version. As the symphony draws to a close, the main theme of the first movement is recalled, and in the final version, is actually used to bring about the final D major cadence.

== Instrumentation ==
The score calls for two flutes, two oboes, two clarinets, two bassoons, four horns, three trumpets, three trombones, timpani and strings.

== Reception ==
According to widespread opinion, the Third can be regarded as Bruckner's artistic breakthrough. In it, the "real and complete Bruckner" comes into expression for the first time. According to Rudolf Kloiber, the third symphony "opens the sequence of Bruckner's masterpieces, in which his creativity meets monumental ability of symphonic construction." However, the difficult work has never received general critical acceptance. Especially the question of the different versions and their judgement is still as open as ever.

Despite being very critical of this Symphony, Robert Simpson quoted a passage from the first movement, rehearsal letter F, in his own Symphony No. 9. Simpson later modified his critical view (expressed in the 1966 edition of his The Essence of Bruckner) after encountering the 1873 version, which he described in a programme note for the Royal Philharmonic Society in 1987 as "a great work – not perfect by any means but possessing a majestic momentum the later revisions altogether destroyed".

Symphony No. 3 was a favorite of conductor Hans Knappertsbusch.

== Versions ==
There exist no fewer than six versions, three of them being issued: the 1873 original version, the 1877–78 version, and the composer's last thoughts of 1889.

=== First version (1873) ===
The 1873 version was the version that Bruckner sent to Wagner for his approval. It is available in an edition by Leopold Nowak (published 1977), which is based on Wagner's fair copy. It was first performed by Hans-Hubert Schönzeler at the Adelaide Festival of Arts in Australia in 1978.

==== The 1874 revision ====
Bruckner revised the symphony in 1874.

As described by Carragan in its presentation paper "Bruckner's Trumpet", the "significant improved" 1874 version is, movement for movement, of the same length and structure as the 1873 original version, but there are many passages, particularly in the first movement, with major changes in texture (canonic imitation) and orchestration. The 1874 version has been premiered and recorded by Gerd Schaller and the Philharmonie Festiva.

This symphony and the Fourth are the most-revised compositions in Bruckner’s canon … As one follows the increasing sophistication in the developing style of Bruckner’s canonic writing one obtains a window into the expert and intricate counterpoint of the great fugue of the Fifth Symphony.

=== Second version (1876–1878) ===
==== The "1876" version ====
Bruckner revised the Symphony in 1876.

The 1876 Adagio has been edited by Nowak in 1980. In this version of the Adagio, the openings of parts 1 and 3 were broadened, and in part 5 the difficult accompaniment in syncopated semiquavers is replaced by that used by Wagner in the overture of Tannhäuser.

The other movements of the "1876" version of the Symphony have been reconstructed by Carragan.

In this revision … the citations of themes from Wagner’s operas Tristan und Isolde and Die Walküre were removed from the first movement and finale... [I]n the first movement the opening trumpet theme was added as a two-part canon near the end of the exposition. [I]n the finale that same motto theme was also made into a brilliant four-part canon which was placed in the middle of the development. [It] is an interesting passage of 38 measures in which the chorale theme from the second or B theme group is played unexpectedly loudly accompanied by material from the A theme and the motto theme from the first movement. This is followed by a dialogue between the loud C theme and the quiet B theme chorale.

As Carragan writes, "This version, though completed in the spring of 1877, is called the "1876" version because its characteristic five-part slow movement was dated 1876 and was published many years ago by Nowak with that date. In that way confusion with the version as later revised in the fall of 1877 can be avoided."

The reconstructed "1876" version of the Third Symphony, which constitutes the earliest phase of the second version of that much-revised symphony, was given its first performance on March 2, 2019, by the New England Philharmonic Orchestra under the direction of Richard Pittman in Boston, Massachusetts.

==== The 1877/1878 revision ====
From the fall of 1877, Bruckner revised the symphony further:

- In the Adagio, part 3, devoted to the A theme, was completely deleted along with the first third of Part 4 (bars 129–176), and, in part 5, the quote of the overture of Tannhäuser was replaced by another motive. The result was a sort of approximation to a three-part song form ABA.
- An additional cut in the Finale of a passage, in which the chorale theme from the B theme group is played unexpectedly loudly, accompanied by material from the A theme and the trumpet theme from the first movement, followed by a dialogue between the loud C theme and the quiet B theme chorale, was also done.
- In 1878, a powerful coda was added to the Scherzo.

According to an advertisement in the Neue Freie Presse in Vienna, on 23 May 1880, the full score and parts of the 1877 version had just appeared in print by Thomas Rättig in Vienna. The 1877 version, which was first published without Scherzo coda by Fritz Oeser in 1950, was republished with the Scherzo coda of 1878 by Nowak in 1981. A transcription of this version for piano duet was prepared by Gustav Mahler (the last movement presumably by Rudolf Krzyzanowski), though only Mahler's name appears on the title page of the score, published on 1 January 1880 by A. Bösendorfer in Vienna.

=== Third version (1889) ===
The 1889 version was published by Nowak in 1959. In this version, the Scherzo coda is removed and additional cuts are done in the first movement and the Finale.

==== The 1890 revision ====
The first published version of 1890, published by Thomas Rättig (Vienna), remains controversial because it has not been ascertained how much it reflected Bruckner's wishes, and how much it was influenced by Josef and Franz Schalk.

== Discography ==
The first commercial recording of part of this symphony was made by Anton Konrath with the Vienna Symphony in 1928. It featured only the scherzo and trio.

The oldest complete performance preserved on disc is by Eugen Jochum with the Philharmonisches Staatsorchester Hamburg from 1944.

The first commercial recording of the complete symphony was made in 1953. The recording, from a live concert, was issued by the Allegro-Royale label with the conductor "Gerd Rubahn" (pseudonym for Hans Schmidt-Isserstedt). This historical recording has been remastered to CD (CD abruckner.com BSVD-0114).

The 1890 Rättig edition is generally used by the older conductors of the LP era, such as Hans Knappertsbusch conducting the Bavarian State Opera Orchestra and Carl Schuricht conducting the Vienna Philharmonic Orchestra.

With the dawn of the CD era, the 1877 and 1889 versions, as edited by Nowak, were more commonly used, by conductors such as Bernard Haitink and Karl Böhm.

Eliahu Inbal conducting the Frankfurt Radio Symphony for Warner Classics was in 1983 the first to record the 1873 version. Georg Tintner conducting the Royal Scottish National Orchestra followed 15 years later on the Naxos label. As Tintner writes, "this work as originally conceived suffered by its progressive mutilations more and more, and we should take the time to play and to listen to this amazing original."

Gerd Schaller first recorded the 1874 version, edited by William Carragan, with the Philharmonie Festiva.

To facilitate comparison of the different versions, Johannes Wildner conducting the Neue Philharmonie Westfalen, in a studio recording (SonArte/Naxos) offers multi-disc sets. Naxos includes both the 1877 and 1889 versions while SonArte includes all three of the 1873, 1877 and 1889 versions.
