= Georg Ludwig Jochum =

German conductor (1909-1970)

Georg Ludwig Jochum (sometimes hyphenated as Georg-Ludwig Jochum) (10 December 1909 – 1 November 1970) was a German conductor and younger brother of better-known conductor Eugen Jochum.

He was born in Babenhausen near Augsburg, Germany. After studies in Munich, in 1932 he was appointed general music director of the city of Münster. This made him the youngest orchestral chief in Germany. Like his brother, he is especially associated with the music of Anton Bruckner. His recording of Bruckner's Symphony No. 2, released in 1944, was the first recording of this work available on records. He died in Mülheim, Germany.
