= Fritz Oeser =

German musicologist

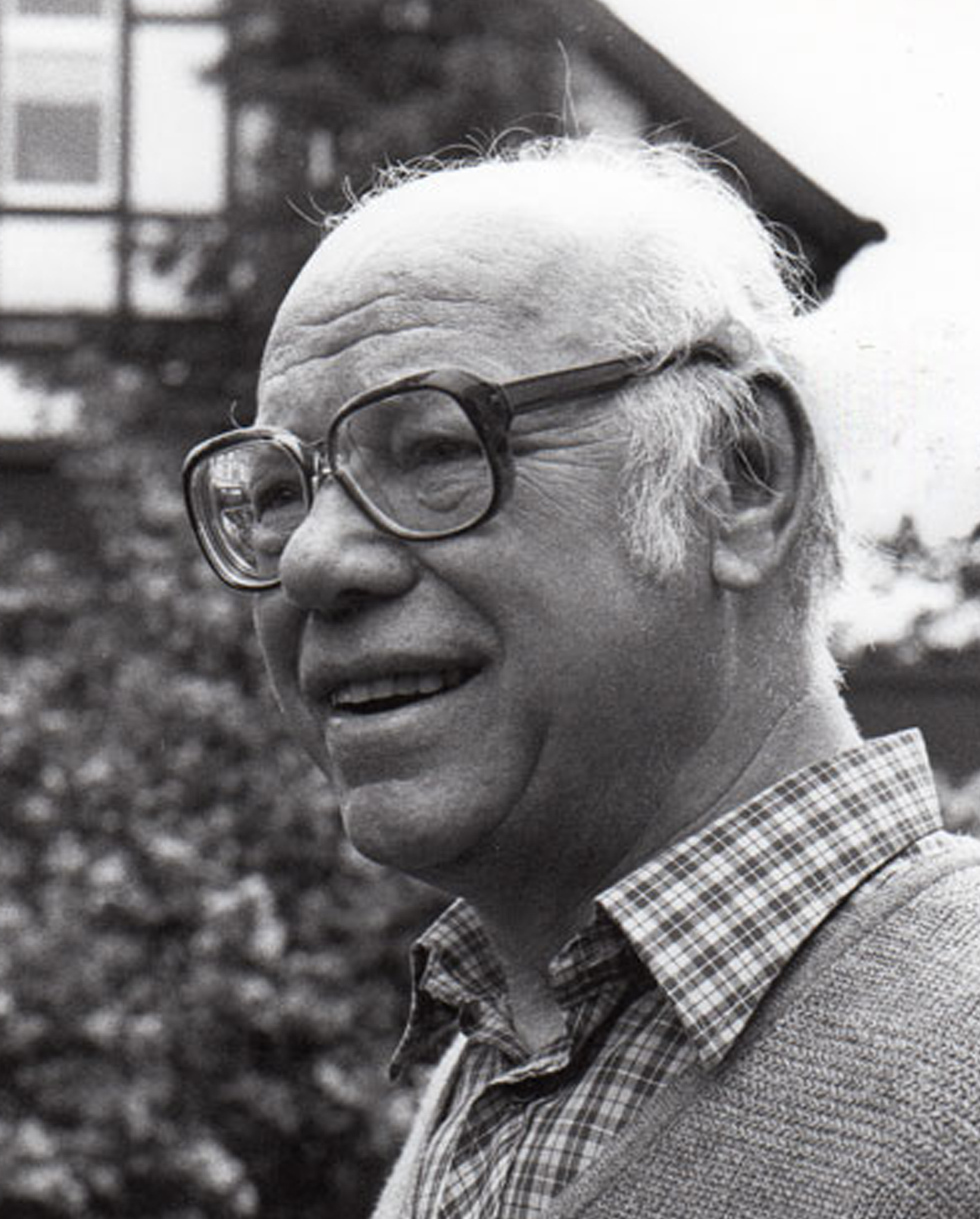

Fritz Oeser (May 18, 1911, Gera – February 23, 1982, Kassel) was a musicologist, most famous for preparing restored versions of Bizet's Carmen in 1964 and Offenbach's Les contes d'Hoffmann in 1976. The former was heavily criticized for lack of editorial integrity by Winton Dean. He also edited the 1877 version of Anton Bruckner's Third Symphony in D Minor (published 1950).

Oeser was educated at the University of Leipzig and the Leipzig Conservatory. His teachers included Helmuth Schultz and Theodor Kroyer. He was a recognized authority on Anton Bruckner and his music. He worked for the Musikwissenschaftlicher Verlag (Bruckner-Verlag) publishing house in Leipzig.
