= Eugen Jochum =

German conductor (1902–1987)

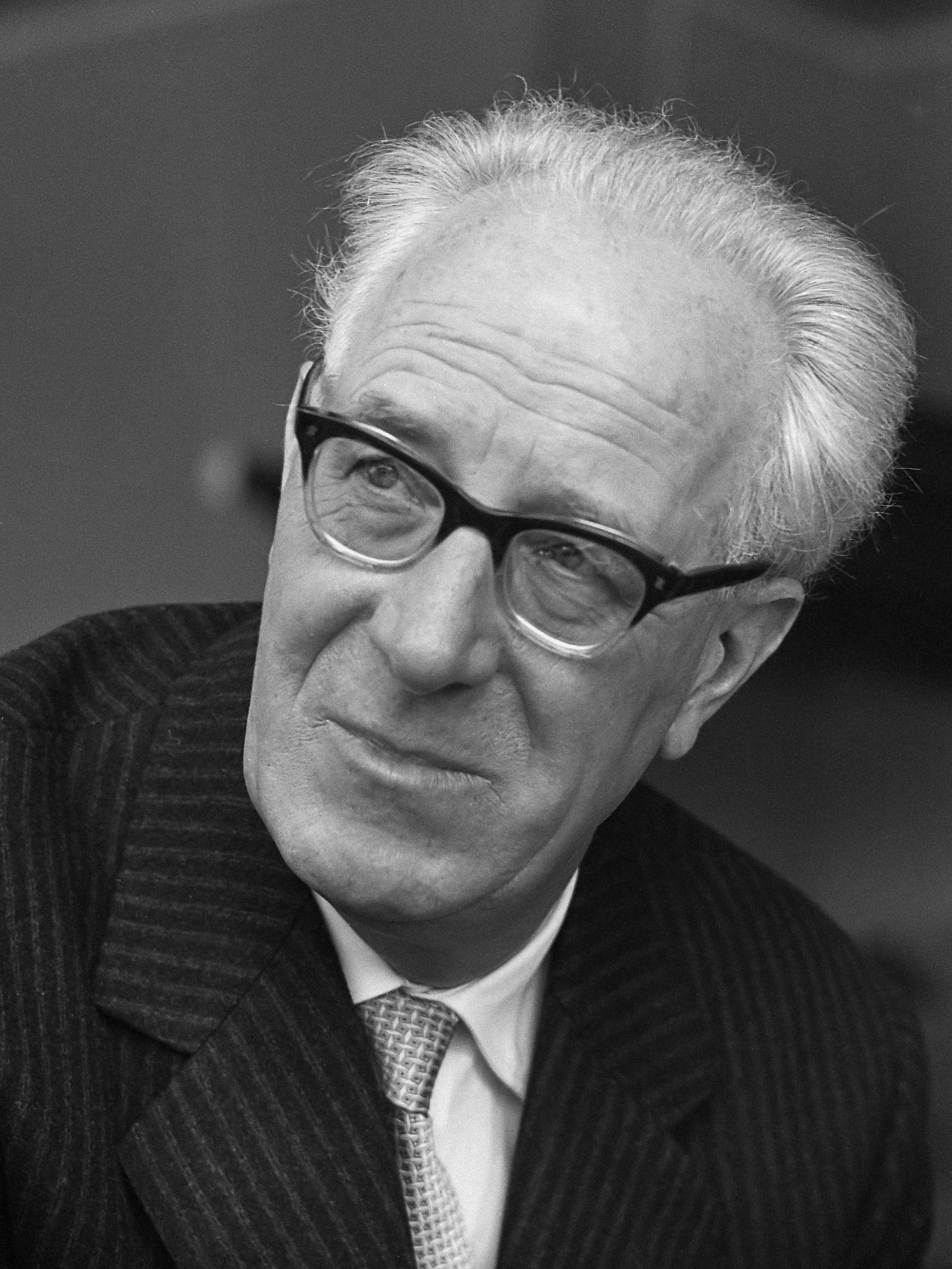
Eugen Jochum (1961)

Eugen Jochum (German: [ˈɔʏɡeːn ˈjɔxʊm, ˈɔʏɡn̩ -]; 1 November 1902 – 26 March 1987) was a German conductor, best known for his interpretations of the music of Anton Bruckner and Johannes Brahms, among others. He was principal conductor for the Berlin Radio (1932–1944), Bavarian (1949–1960) and Bamberg (1969–1973) symphony orchestras.

== Biography ==
Jochum was born to a Roman Catholic family in Babenhausen, near Augsburg, Germany; his father was an organist and conductor. Jochum studied the piano and organ in Augsburg, enrolling in its Academy of Music from 1914 to 1922. He then studied at the Munich Conservatory, with his composition teacher being Hermann von Waltershausen; it was there that he changed his focus to conducting, his teacher being Siegmund von Hausegger, who conducted the first performance of the original version of the Ninth Symphony of Anton Bruckner and made the first recording of it.

Jochum's first post was as a rehearsal pianist at Mönchen-Gladbach, and then in Kiel. He made his conducting debut with the Munich Philharmonic Orchestra in 1926 in a program which included Bruckner's Seventh Symphony. In the same year he was appointed conductor at the Kiel Opera House, where he conducted seventeen operas in his first season, including Der fliegende Holländer, Der Rosenkavalier and Turandot.

After Kiel he went to Mannheim, where Wilhelm Furtwängler praised his conducting. He turned down an offer to conduct twelve concerts with the New York Philharmonic-Symphony Orchestra, believing that his repertory and experience were not yet equal to it. (He did not appear in America until 1958.) His next appointment was as music director in Duisburg, from 1930 to 1932. In 1932 he became chief of the Berlin Radio Orchestra, also conducting 16 concerts a season with the Berlin Philharmonic, and at the Deutsche Oper.

In 1934 Jochum succeeded Karl Böhm as musical director of the Hamburg State Opera and the Hamburg Philharmonic. Throughout the Nazi era, Hamburg remained, as Jochum put it, "reasonably liberal", and Jochum was even able to keep his post despite not joining the party. He performed music by composers such as Hindemith and Bartók elsewhere banned by the Nazis. In 1944, Joseph Goebbels included Jochum in the Gottbegnadeten list.

In the postwar denazification initiatives, however, British and American authorities had a "high-level disagreement" over Jochum that was "an exception" to the usual pattern of British authorities following the American lead: after "initially clearing" Jochum and selecting him to conduct the Munich Philharmonic in May 1945, the American authorities temporarily blacklisted him on grounds that he "had done exceptionally well" during the war and that his brothers had been "fanatical" Nazis; but British authorities "found no fault" with Jochum, arguing that he had never been a member of the Nazi party, SS or Sturmabteilung, had remained a "convinced Roman Catholic," and had "not compromised his artistic integrity." It took until 1948 before the American authorities determined that they could find no evidence of his joining any Nazi organizations.

Jochum continued to serve at Hamburg until 1949, then left when the newly reconstituted Bayerischer Rundfunk appointed him the founding music director of its new orchestra, the Bavarian Radio Symphony Orchestra. To build the orchestra, Jochum "recruited highly qualified musicians," including the Koeckert Quartet as the "nucleus of the strings". Jochum remained music director of the orchestra until 1961; with it, he made numerous recordings, mostly for Deutsche Grammophon.

Jochum was also a regular guest conductor of the Concertgebouw Orchestra, Amsterdam, and served as the orchestra's 'first conductor' (eerste dirigent) from 1941 to 1943, during the chief conductorship of Willem Mengelberg. From 1961 to 1963, Jochum was joint chief conductor of the Concertgebouw Orchestra alongside Bernard Haitink. He conducted frequently in London, with the London Philharmonic Orchestra and the London Symphony Orchestra. In 1975, the LSO appointed him conductor laureate, a position he held until 1978. Jochum served as principal conductor of the Bamberg Symphony from 1969 to 1973. He later worked regularly with the Staatskapelle Dresden, with which he recorded the complete symphonies of Bruckner and "London" symphonies of Joseph Haydn (which latter he also recorded with the London Philharmonic). He appeared regularly at the Salzburg Festival. He also, in 1953–54 and 1971, conducted at the Bayreuth Festspielhaus; he made his debut conducting Tristan und Isolde.

He led the world premieres of various works, including the Concerto for Strings by Boris Blacher, the Concerte per il principe Eugenio by Alberto Bruno Tedeschi, the Suite Française by Werner Egk, the Tanz-Rondo by Gottfried von Einem, and the Symphony No. 6 by Karl Amadeus Hartmann.

He was a regular recording artist, from his first records in 1932. In the stereo LP era, he recorded mainly for Deutsche Grammophon. His DG cycle of the symphonies of Anton Bruckner, split between the Berlin Philharmonic and Bavarian Radio Symphony Orchestra, has remained in the record catalogs ever since its first issue in the 1960s. This cycle and a later Jochum Bruckner cycle, with the Staatskapelle Dresden for EMI, have been widely and frequently acclaimed and have caused his name to be especially associated with this composer. In addition, he was president of the International Bruckner Society from 1950, and wrote extensively about Bruckner interpretation. Still, according to his New York Times obituary, he said in a 1983 interview, "Today, everyone thinks of me as a specialist in Bruckner's symphonies. But I began with the music of Bach, Mozart and Beethoven. And it is to their music that I still feel closest." His recordings of Bach's Mass in B minor and St. John Passion are frequently counted among the finest of these works. His three complete recordings of the Beethoven symphonies have also been strongly praised: they were made with the Berlin Philharmonic and Bavarian Radio Symphony Orchestra in the 1950s for Deutsche Grammophon, with the Royal Concertgebouw Orchestra in the late 1960s for Philips, and with the London Symphony Orchestra in the 1970s for EMI. Jochum also made two complete recordings of the symphonies of Johannes Brahms, one with the Berlin Philharmonic in the mid-1950s, the other with the London Philharmonic in 1977. On the strengths of these sets, the conductor Kenneth Woods called him "the greatest Brahms conductor who ever lived." (Others would nominate Weingartner or Toscanini.) He also recorded the Brahms piano concertos with Emil Gilels, a recording that is often listed among the finest made of these works. His recordings of Mozart, Haydn, Schumann, Wagner and Carl Orff have also been highly praised. His 1967 recording of Carmina Burana is considered by Bill Alford to be an authoritative interpretation, as Orff himself was present during the recording and endorsed the finished product.

Regarding his podium technique, Kenneth Woods blogs, "Look at his hands -- very small and focused motions but so powerful." Woods also states that "his sense of rubato, while still incredibly daring, is perhaps more un-erring than even that of Wilhelm Furtwängler."

Jochum's older brother Otto Jochum (1898–1969) was a composer and choral conductor; his younger brother Georg Ludwig Jochum (1909–1970) was, like Jochum, an orchestral conductor. His daughter Veronica Jochum (1932-2026) was a pianist on the faculty of the New England Conservatory of Music in Boston, Massachusetts.

Jochum died in Munich in 1987, at the age of 84.

== Notable recordings ==
- Anton Bruckner, Third Symphony, Hamburg State Philharmonic Orchestra, 1944 (first commercial recording of the complete symphony)
- Anton Bruckner, Fourth Symphony, Berlin Philharmonic Orchestra, 1965
- Anton Bruckner, Fifth Symphony, Bavarian Radio Symphony Orchestra, 1958
- Anton Bruckner, Fifth Symphony, Concertgebouworkest, 1963
- Anton Bruckner, Eighth Symphony, Hamburg State Philharmonic Orchestra, 1949 (first commercial recording of the complete symphony)
- Anton Bruckner, Ninth Symphony, Bavarian Radio Symphony Orchestra, 1954
- Carl Orff, Carmina Burana, Bavarian Radio Symphony Orchestra, 1953 (first recording)
- Ludwig van Beethoven, Violin Concerto, Berlin Philharmonic, 1962
- Ludwig van Beethoven, Symphony No. 9 in D minor Op. 125 Choral, Netherlands Radio Chorus Concertgebouw Orchestra, Amsterdam, 1969 (Dr. J. Ward)
- Richard Wagner, Die Meistersinger von Nürnberg, Deutsche Oper Berlin, 1976 (with Dietrich Fischer-Dieskau, Plácido Domingo, and others)
- Johannes Brahms, Piano Concerto No. 1, Berlin Philharmonic Orchestra, with Emil Gilels, 1972
- Johannes Brahms, Symphonies 1–4, Berlin Philharmonic Orchestra, 1951-1956

Preceded by Joseph Keilberth	Principal Conductor, Bamberg Symphony Orchestra; 1969–1973	Succeeded by James Loughran
