= Joseph Schalk =

Austrian conductor, musicologist and pianist (1857–1900)

Joseph Schalk (24 March 1857 – 7 November 1900) was an Austrian conductor, musicologist and pianist. His name is often given as Josef Schalk.

Schalk was born in Vienna, Austria, and together with younger brother Franz, was a student of composer Anton Bruckner (1824–1896), and a friend of composer Hugo Wolf (1860–1903). He was a prominent figure in Viennese musical life of the late nineteenth-century, a vocal advocate for the music of Wagner, Bruckner and Wolf: in this capacity he was opposed to the more conservative supporters of Brahms who were led by the critic Eduard Hanslick. As president of the Vienna Wagner Society, Schalk was active in arranging performances of Bruckner's work: he also popularized his teacher's music by arranging it for piano performance, writing articles and arranging for its publication. He played a comparable role in popularizing Wolf's music. Bruckner is said to have referred to him as Herr Generalissimus.

Schalk was involved in the preparation of several of Bruckner's scores for their first publication or performance: these include the Third and Eighth symphonies, along with the Mass in F Minor.

Schalk wrote a series of articles under the collective title Das Gesetz der Tonalität (the law of tonality) which laid down his theory of harmony, based on his teaching from Bruckner.

He was later a professor at the Vienna Conservatory. Upon Bruckner's death, Schalk was named administrator of his library of music scores.

== Writings ==
- Schalk, Josef (1888–1889). "Das Gesetz der Tonalität". Bayreuther Blätter. 11, 12, 13.
