= Arpeggione Sonata =

Sonata by Franz Schubert

- by Franz Schubert
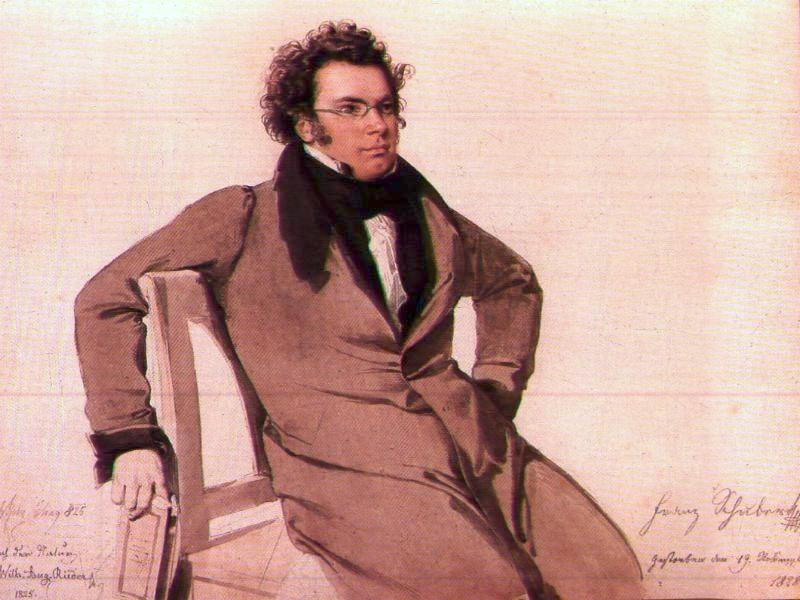
- Franz Schubert by Wilhelm August Rieder, 1825
- Key: A minor
- Catalogue: D. 821
- Composed: 1824
- Published: 1871
- Movements: three

The Sonata for Arpeggione and Piano in A minor, D. 821, was written by Franz Schubert in Vienna in November 1824. The sonata is the only substantial composition extant today for the arpeggione (which was essentially a bowed guitar). The sonata was composed in November 1824, about a month after Schubert had returned to Vienna from his second stay in Zseliz. It has been adapted to other string instruments, especially the cello and viola.

== History ==
The piece was probably commissioned by Schubert's friend Vincenz Schuster, who was a virtuoso of the arpeggione, an instrument which had been invented only the previous year. By the time the sonata was published posthumously in 1871, the enthusiasm for the novelty of the arpeggione had long since vanished, together with the instrument itself.

== Movements ==
Arpeggione Sonata
I. Allegro Moderato

II. Adagio and III. Allegretto
Performed by Hans Goldstein (cello) and Clinton Adams (piano)

III. Allegretto
Performed by Elias Goldstein (viola) with the Advent Chamber Orchestra

The work consists of three movements. A typical performance takes just over 20 minutes.

1. Allegro moderato
2. Adagio in E major
3. Allegretto in A major

== Performance history ==
Today, the piece is heard almost exclusively in transcriptions for cello and piano or viola and piano that were arranged after the posthumous publication, although versions that substitute other instruments—including violin, double bass, flute, euphonium, alto saxophone and clarinet for the arpeggione, or guitar or harp for the piano part—are also performed. Transcribers have attempted to address the problems posed by the smaller playing range of these alternative instruments, in comparison with the arpeggione, as well as the attendant modifications in articulation (4 versus 6 strings).

Notable arrangements include:

- Gaspar Cassadó – cello and orchestra
- Göran Söllscher – violin and guitar
- James Galway – flute
- Dobrinka Tabakova – viola and string orchestra
- David Werden – Euphonium and Piano
- J. Michael Leonard – Alto Saxophone and Piano
- Brian Newbould – clarinet quintet

The work has been recorded in the original version by the following musicians:

- Klaus Storck and Alfons Kontarsky (1974, LP No 2533 174 on the Archiv Produktion label). Klaus Storck played an arpeggione attributed to Anton Mitteis, a student of the instrument's inventor, Johann Georg Stauffer; Alfons Kontarsky played a Brodmann fortepiano built in Vienna ca. 1810.
- Alfred Lessing and Jozef De Beenhouwer (2000–2001, Ars Produktion FCD 368 392). Played on a copy by Henning Aschauer of an early 19th-century instrument built either by J. G. Staufer or by Anton Mitteis, at present in the Musical Instrument Collection of the Prussian Cultural Heritage Foundation and on the 1824 Conrad Graf pianoforte from the Beethoven House in Bonn.
- Gerhart Darmstadt and Egino Klepper (2005, Cavalli Records CCD 242)
- Nicolas Deletaille and Paul Badura-Skoda (2006–2007, Fuga Libera FUG529). This recording was made in Florence (Accademia Bartolomeo Cristofori) on a Benjamen La Brigue arpeggione (2001) and the fortepiano is a Conrad Graf (ca. 1820)
- Nicolas Deletaille and Alain Roudier (2012, Ad Libitum)
- Lorenz Duftschmid (arpeggione by Caroline Zilmann & Steffen Milbradt, 1999 Meissen after Mitteis/Staufer ca. 1825) and Paul Gulda (fortepiano by Conrad Graf, 1824)
- Emmanuel Girard and Chie Hirai
- Guido Balestracci and Maude Gratton
- Alexander Rudin and Aapo Höbarth (Conrad Graf, 1827)
- Michal Kaňka (original arpeggione by Georg Stauffer, Vienna, 1832) and Jaromir Klepác (fortepiano by Joseph Donhal, Vienna, ca. 1808–1818) recorded the middle movement only of the sonata.

Other musicians recorded the work on historical instruments, but employed a historical cello rather than an arpeggione. Among those are the following:

- Pieter Wispelwey (bohemian cello, 19th-century) and Paolo Giacometti (fortepiano by Salvatore Lagrassa, c. 1815).
- Anner Bylsma (anonymous violoncello piccolo, 5 strings, Tirol. ca. 1700) and Jos Van Immerseel (fortepiano by Johann Nepomuk Tröndlin, Leipzig, early 19th-century).
- Stefano Veggetti (5 strings violoncello piccolo by Christian Gottfried Schönfelder, 1750) and Jos Van Immerseel (fortepiano by Conrad Graf, 1826).
- Ernst Simon Glaser (unspecified cello, possibly modern) and Liv Glaser (fortepiano by Alois Graff, 1825).
