= Deckert =

Deckert is a surname. Notable people with the surname include:

- Alf-Gerd Deckert (born 1955), German cross-country skier
- Blue Deckert American actor
- Claudelle Deckert (born 1974), German actress
- Günter Deckert (born 1940), far-right German political activist
- Günter Deckert (Nordic combined) (1950–2005), East German Nordic combined skier
- Hans Erik Deckert (1927–2022), German cellist
- Heinz Deckert (1927–2008), German trade union leader
- Josef Deckert (1843–1901), Austrian Catholic priest and anti-Semitic agitator
- Manfred Deckert (born 1961), East German ski jumper
- Ryan Deckert (born c. 1971), businessman and politician in Oregon, U.S.
- Tempany Deckert (born 1978), Australian actress and author
