= Wolfgang Schoor =

German composer

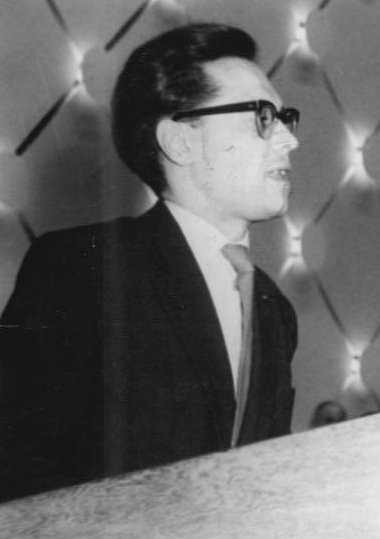
Schoor bei einer Rede auf dem 9. Parteitag der DDR-CDU on 4 October 1958

Wolfgang Schoor (18 September 1926 – 28 January 2007) was a German composer, who wrote orchestral works, song cycles and chamber music and the music for numerous children's and documentary films and radio plays.

== Life ==
The Cologne-born composer, conductor and song accompanist learned the musical craft in private lessons, at the Rheinische Musikschule Cologne, at the Musisches Gymnasium Frankfurt and at the Hochschule für Musik und Tanz Köln.

Studies took place with, among others, Otto A. Graef (piano), Helmut Walcha (organ/harpsichord), Walter Henker (bassoon), Kurt Thomas (choral conducting, composition) and Günter Wand (conducting) as well as consultations with Karl Amadeus Hartmann.

Schoor worked as a freelance composer from 1950 1949-1952 also as a music critic for the Kölnische Rundschau, moved to Weimar in the GDR in 1957 and wrote music for numerous documentaries there. He gained national fame in particular for composing the music for the documentary film Das Jahr 1945 and the title melody of the foreign policy GDR magazine Objektiv. In addition to very numerous pieces of music for radio plays of various genres, Schoor composed song cycles, solo concertos and chamber music works in the Berlin-Brandenburg region. In the mid-1990s, he settled in Wernigerode and composed extensive orchestral works there. He dedicated one of them to his adopted hometown.

Schoor died at the age of 80. His funeral took place on 10 February 2007 at the cemetery in Treseburg.

== Work ==
=== Ensemble and orchestral music ===
- Tanzsuite für Orchester
- Archaismen für vier Orchestergruppen (1951) premiere 1952
- Concerto Rheinsberg für Orchester premiere 1963
- Sinfonie IN MEMORIAM Johannes R. Becher (1963) [syn. „Sinfonie ’62“]

1. Adagio 2. Allegretto 3. Andante (piu Adagio) 4. Vivace

- Konzert für Klavier und Orchester (REQUIEM PROFANUM – Erinnern an St. G.) (1987) premiere 1990

I. Larghetto – Vivo II. Adagio ma non troppo III. Kadenz – Allegro

- Stimmen Adagio für 15 Streichinstrumente (1988) premiere 1988
- Sinfonietta giocosa für Blasorchester (1990) premiere [in 3 Sätzen]
- Stimmen II (Ilseade) Musik für 19 Streichinstrumente premiere 1994
- Alegria Kammerkonzert für Flöte und Streichorchester (2000) premiere

Allegro contenido – Adagio pensoso – Rondo irrompente escabroso

- Konzert für Violoncello und Orchester (2005) [in 3 Sätzen]

=== Vocal music ===
- Die junge Magd (Georg Trakl) – Sechs Lieder für Alt und Klavier (1947) premiere 1948
- Strophen der Nacht von Hertha Jaegerschmid für Mezzo-Alt und Klavier (1947/48) premiere 1948

1. Uralte Strophen der Nacht 2. Aus wogenden Gründen 3. Und wieder wallen

- Traum des Bösen Sieben Gesänge nach Gedichten von Georg Trakl für Altstimme (auch Bariton), piano (oder Cembalo), zwei Trompeten in C, Oboe, Fagott und vier Violoncelli premiere 1948

I. Rondel 2. Allerseelen 3. Winterdämmerung 4. Traum des Bösen 5. Melancholie 6. In den Nachmittag geflüstert 7. In ein altes Stammbuch

- Liebes-Lobpreisung – Ein Zyklus in fünfzehn Gesängen nach dem gleichnamigen Gedichtwerk von Franz Tumler für Sopranstimme, Flöte, Oboe, Klarinette und Klavier (1948) premiere 1949
- O Magd, begreifst du... (Heinrich Roggendorf) – Fünfzehn Gesänge für Altstimme und Klavier (1950) [syn. Die weißen Knospen – Die schwarzen Kelche – Die roten Blüten (Kranz der Rosen)] premiere 1951
- Die Erinnerung (Stephan Hermlin) – Gesänge für Altstimme und Klavier, premiere 1955; – Ein Zyklus von Gesängen für Alt oder Bariton und Klavier (1958) [erweiterte Fassung, 13 Teile], premiere

Terzinen – Triolette – Sie sehen einander nicht wieder – Forderung des Tages – Die Asche von Birkenau

- Ein Denkmal für Dascha (text Paul Wiens) – Szenisches Oratorium für zwei Soli, zwei gemischte Chöre und großes Orchester (1958/60)
- Ballade von einem Städtebewohner in tiefer Not – Dreizehn Gesänge für Alt oder Bariton und Klavier (Stephan Hermlin) (1961) premiere 1962
- Fünf Liebeslieder (Peter Hacks) für Bariton und Klavier (1977/78) premiere 1978

1. Kanzone des Königs Salomon 2. Über die Liebe zu Meerweibern 3. Anläßlich der Wiedergewinnung des Paradieses 4. Unter'm Weißdorn 5. Morpheus [1.u.2. Orchesterfassung (1980)]

- Lyoneser Konzert für Sopran, Streichquartett und Klavier nach Sonetten der schönen Seilerin (Louise Labe), premiere 1981

1. agitamento, espiranto 2. Hat einer von den vielen Männern in der Welt 3. canzona alla francesa
4. O Venus, heller Stern am Firmament 5. cabaletta dolente 6. So lange noch mein Auge Tränen hat 7. ex tempore 8. Wenn mich der Tag so müde hat gemacht 9. canto fratto 10. Den Weg zu ebnen 11. canto sospiroso 12. Was fang ich damit an

- Rückschauend das Heute durchschauend – Sieben Gesänge für Tenor und Orchester (1981) [text Johann Wolfgang von Goethe, Georg Heym, Adelbert von Chamisso, Friedrich Hölderlin, Christa Wolf, Stephan Hermlin, Johannes R. Becher] premiere 1981

1. Natur und Kunst 2. Russland (March 1911) 3. Vom Pythargoreischen Lehrsatz 4. Vorm Abgrund nämlich 5. Das Vergangene ist nicht tot 6. Die Vögel und der Test 7. Rückschauend

- Was ich sag, ist Bekenntnis – Ein Zyklus von Liedern für Tenor und Klavier nach Worten von Johann Wolfgang von Goethe [Textzusammenstellung: J. Voigt] (1981), premiere 1985

Was ich sag', ist Bekenntnis – Interludium 1 – Teilen kann ich nicht das Leben – Interludium 2 – Liebesbedürfnis – Interludium 3 – Natur und Kunst

- Und in uns sind die Wälder, nicht sehr fern – Liederzyklus für Sopran, Bariton und Klavier nach texts by Dagmar Hilarová/ Miep Diekmann and Rajzel Żychlińsky (1985), premiere

Therezin 1944 – Die erste Nacht – Die Welt – Von allen Wegen – Windige Nacht – Transport – Zeit – Es flattern die Wege – Liebe – Gott hat verborgen sein Gesicht – Hinter dem Krematorium – Die Kapelle – Wenn die Fenster – Mors poetica – Mai '45 – Zu Hause dann...

- Die Verheißung des Menschen (NUR DAS TIER KENNT KEINE UTOPIE Walter Benjamin) – Kammeroratorium für Sopran, Tenor, Sprechstimmen, Flöte, Oboe, Klarinette, Tenorposaune, Violoncello, Schlagwerk und Klavier [text André Bonnard, Grafiken: Hans Erni] (1986), premiere 1987
- Welch Wort, in die Kälte gerufen – Vier Gesänge für Sopran und Orchester nach Worten von Ingeborg Bachmann and Günter Kunert – Erinnerung an den 9. November 1938, den Tag der landesweiten Judenpogrome in Deutschland, premiere 1988

1. Die Nacht entfaltet den trauernden Teil des Gesichts 2. Eine einzige Stunde frei sein 3. Wenn die Feuer verloschen sind 4. Nach dieser Sintflut

- Atmen, durch die Kehle des Schilfrohrs – Ein Liederzyklus für Bariton und Klavier nach Gedichten von Peter Huchel (1992) [17 Lieder, 4 Interludien, Widmungen: Ernst Bloch, Hans Mayer], premiere 1993 (Peter-Huchel-Preis-Verleihung an Sarah Kirsch)
- Dialoge für Tenor und Klarinette nach Texten aus „Lichtzwang“ by Paul Celan premiere 1994

Für den Lerchenschatten – Wahngänger Augen – Wurfscheibe – Das angebrochene Jahr – Todtnauberg – Was es an Sternen bedarf – Wo ich mich in dir vergaß – Ich höre, die Axt hat geblüht

- Dialoge II für Sopran und Flöte nach Gedichten von Marina Tsvetaeva (1996), premiere

Nah – Ich gehe – Bist fort – Abstand – Zeit

- Kinderlieder, Volkslieder (among others from Des Knaben Wunderhorn bzw. Der himmlische Hag and In Veil und grünem Klee by Franz Peter Kürten), Lieder und Chansons für Soli bzw. Chor in ein- bis vielstimmigen Einrichtungen (text Louis Aragon, Werner Bergengruen, Hans Bethge, Richard Billinger, Johannes Bobrowski, Adelbert von Chamisso, Joseph von Eichendorff, Andreas Gryphius, Stephan Hermlin, Friedrich Hölderlin, Friederike Kempner, Alois Johannes Lippl, Pablo Neruda, Nikolaus Lenau, Karl Mickel, Heinrich Roggendorf, W. Schoor, Theodor Storm),

=== Chamber music/Solo instruments ===
- Ciacona con variazioni für Violine und Klavier premiere 1948
- Kleine Suite für Guitarre solo (1948)
- 1. Streichquartett premiere 1949
- Heitere Musik in vier Sätzen für Flöte, Oboe, Klarinette (A), Horn (F) und Fagott (Bläserquintett) (1952) premiere 1952
- 2. Streichquartett (1953) premiere 1954

Allegro vivo – Adagio, attacca – Perenita – Presto

- Kinderspiele Drei Stücke für Flöte, Oboe und Violoncello (1959)
- Divertimento 1962 für Flöte, Oboe, Englischhorn, Klarinette, Baßklarinette, Fagott, Trompete, Kontrabaß und Schlagzeug (1962) premiere 1962

1. Episode 2. Varia 3. Quaternio 4. Tadshikisches Rondo

- Vierzehn Miniaturen zu Bildern von Hans Purrmann for piano (1963) premiere 1963
- Französische Hefte (Ilja Ehrenburg) Sextett für Oboe, Altflöte, Fagott, Baßklarinette, Laute und Kontrabaß (1968/69) UA 1969

1. Allegro 2. Adagio (Intermezzo 1) 3. Andante – Recitativo – Andante con moto 4. Adagio (Intermezzo 2) 5. Allegro

- Variablen für Oboe und Klavier [Klavierimprovisation] (1978) premiere 1978

1. Caprice 2. Dialog 3. Allegretto comique 4. Reminiszenz an "Morpheus" 5. Allegro battuto

- Französische Hefte 2 Kammermusik für Klarinette (B), Violoncello und Klavier (1978/79) premiere 1979

I. Vivo II. Intermezzo 1 III. Andante IV. Intermezzo 2 V. Allegro

- Fünf Nachtstücke für Kammerensemble in zwei Gruppen [Flöte, Horn (F), Fagott, Harfe – Englischhorn, Bassetthorn, Viola, Violoncello] (1978)

1. Schwingungen 2. Näherung 3. Berührung 4. Bewegung 5. Schwebungen

- Garufalia Musik für Violoncello (1978), premiere 1979

Garufaliá – Variationen 1,2,3,4 – Memento – Variationen 5,6 – Notturno – Variation 7 (Finale)

- Drei Texte für Sprechstimme und Violoncello (Vicente Aleixandre, Paul Celan) (1979), premiere 1979

1. Liegende, nachts 2. Schibboleth 3. Ich bin das Geschick

- Französische Hefte 3 Trio für Violine, Violoncello und Klavier (Klaviertrio) (1980), premiere 1981

Allegro – Intermezzo 1 – Andante – Intermezzo 2 – Vivo

- Laetare für Orgel (1984), premiere 1984

Adagio – Agitato – Fugato

- Musik für Baßklarinette und Violoncello (1985), premiere 1985

andante-allegretto – allegretto – con moto – recitativo – adagio – agitato-con moto – vivo

- Französische Hefte 4 Kammermusik für 3 Gitarren – Texts by Louis Aragon, André Breton, Robert Desnos, Paul Éluard, Benjamin Péret (1987/88), premiere 1988

1. Liebesverlangen 2. Entwaffnet die Hirne 3. Ich singe, was entflieht 4. Die ihr Blei in den Köpfen habt
5. Die Falter der Nachdenklichkeit – Nichts bleibt wie es war

- Facetten (Französische Hefte 5) Für Flöte, Viola und Bassklarinette. ... und vielleicht für eine Tänzerin ... in drei Räumen (Musik zur Eröffnung einer Kunstausstellung) (1988), premiere 1988
- Sechs Impressionen for piano, premiere 1988
- 3. Streichquartett – Aufbruch und Nachdenken [in einem Satz] (1990) premiere
- Vier Miniaturen for clarinet and violoncello (1990)
- Per aspera Musik für Bassklarinette (1991) premiere

1. Impuls 2. Circulus vit. 3. Notturno affettuoso 4. Skertzo 5. ...AD...

- Drei Fragmente for Klarinette, premiere 1993

1. Caprice 2. Nocturne 3. Questions

- Adagio und Allegretto giocoso für Blockflötenquintett, premiere 1993
- Französische Hefte 6 for flute and piano, premiere

1. con bravura 2. Canzona 3. con spirito 4. Nocturne 5. con fuoco

- Französische Hefte 7 Suite für Flöte und Fagott (1993), premiere

Modus – Varia 1 – Varia 2 – Varia 3 – Dialog – Varia 4

- Griechische Suite für Sopran- und Altblockflöte und Tasteninstrument, premiere 1993

1. Garufaliá 2. Varia 1 3. Das Vöglein 4. Varia 2 5. Siebengestirn 6. Schlaflied 7. Varia 3 (final)

- A+Q... Zur Nacht hin – Quintett für Altsaxophon und Streichquartett mit einem gesprochenen text by Franz Kafka, premiere 1998
- Memento – Réfugiés Hanns Eisler Peter Huchel Robert Havemann Theo Balden Heiner Müller für Streichquartett – text Ingeborg Bachmann (2001)
- Pentagramm I für Fagott solo
- Pentagramm II für Fagott und Klavierimprovisation (2001)
- Burleske für vier Edelhölzer (Drei Fagotte und Kontrafagott), premiere
- Neun Impressionen für Klavier nach Gedichten von Peter Huchel, premiere

1 Der Garten des Theophrast 2 Chausseen 3 Auffliegende Schwäne 4 Interludium 5 Winterpsalm 6 Widmung I 7 Lied am Abend 8 Triolett 9 Widmung II

- Sextett für Flöte, Oboe, Klarinette, Horn, Fagott und Klavier

1. Sehr lebhaft 2. Thema und Variationen 3. Ruhig 4. Sehr bewegt

- Transformationen für Violine und Violoncello

Tu diemed’, diemedili Transformation 1 – Transformation 2 – Transformation 3+4 – Memento – Transformation 5 (final)

=== Church music/spiritual music ===
- Kantate zur Weihnacht für Sopran, Violine und Orgel nach Worten von Else Mögelin, premiere 1946
- Missa brevis I für Solosopran, vierstimmigen gemischten Chor und Orgel (1947), premiere
- Totenfeier – Kleine Kantate nach Worten von Ludwig Altenhofer, Richard Billinger, Hertha Jaegerschmid, Hubert Neufeld, mit verbindenden Teilen aus dem "Requiem" für Altstimme und Orgel (cembalo) (1948), premiere
- Die Passion nach Markus und Worten verschiedener Dichter für Sopran-, Alt-, Tenor-, Bariton- und Baß-Solo, gemischten Chor, Kammerorchester, Cembalo und Orgel (1949) [text Evangelium, Stundengebet, Prophet Isaiah, H. P. Bergler-Schroer, Lilo Ebel, Paul Gerhardt, Gottfried Hasenkamp, Johann Heermann, Hertha Jaegerschmid, W. Schoor, Friedrich Wilhelm Weber], premiere 1949
- Missa brevis II (Kanonmesse) für drei- bis achtstimmigen Chor a cappella (1949), premiere 1950
- Missa brevis III (piccicato-Messe) für Altsolo, drei- bis vierstimmigen gemischten Chor und Streichquartett – Fassung für Solo, Chor und Orgel (1950)

Missa brevis III for three to four-part choir and alto solo, two oboes, two horns in F, three violoncellos and double bass (1952), premiere 1952

=== Film music and musical institutions ===
- 1961: Lin Jaldati singt Teilkomposition (Regie: Gerhardt Jentsch) DEFA
- 1962: Nach einem Jahr – Beobachtungen in einer 1. Klasse (Winfried Junge) DEFA
- 1966: Bertolt Brecht beschreibt bildende Kunst; Ludwig Renn (Wolfram Suckau) DFF
- 1967: Variationen zu einem Thema – Otto Dix (Karl-Heinz Boxberger) DFF
- 1967: Seit 900 Jahren: Unsere Wartburg (Karl-Heinz Boxberger) DFF
- 1970: Augenblicke für später (Peter Voigt) Studio H & S
- 1973: Ewa – Ein Mädchen aus Witunia
- 1975: Das Geheimnis des J.R.B. (Paul Wiens) DEFA
- 1975: Toscanerinnen (Karl Gass/W. Schoor) DEFA
- 1977: Hermann Hesse (Eduard Schreiber); Richard – der Bauer (Karl Gass) DEFA/DFF
- 1978: Nun gut, wir wollen Fechten – Gotthold Ephraim Lessing (Eduard Schreiber) DEFA/DFF
- 1978: De Geyter – Geschichte eines Liedes (Karlheinz Mund) DEFA
- 1978: Im Bruch hinterm Berge – Ehm Welk und Biesenbrow (Karlheinz Mund) DEFA
- 1979: Der Leutnant von Ulm (Karl Gass) DEFA
- 1981: Sie brauchen uns – Beobachtungen in einer Hilfsschule (Karlheinz Mund) DEFA
- 1982: Walter Ballhause – Einer von Millionen (Karlheinz Mund) DEFA
- 1982: Stadtlandschaften
- 1983: Die Geschichte Palästinas (Kaiss Al-Zubaidi) DEFA
- 1983: Die Bibel – das Buch der Gemeinde, Die Entdeckung des Dr. Martin Luther (Lothar Keil) DFF
- 1984: Das Münster zu Doberan (Karlheinz Mund) DEFA
- 1985: Das Jahr 1945 (Karl Gass)
- 1985: Abenteuer im Sajan (Uwe Belz) DEFA/DFF
- 1986: Mit Tiefseetauchern unterwegs (Uwe Belz) DEFA/DFF
- 1986: Friedrich Press – Tod und Auferstehung (Lothar Keil) DFF
- 1987: Stielke, Heinz, fünfzehn… (Michael Kann), DEFA
- 1987: Eine deutsche Karriere – Rückblick auf unser Jahrhundert (Karl Gass) DEFA
- 1988: Jeder konnte es sehen (Karl Gass) DEFA
- 1990: Nationalität: deutsch (Karl Gass) DEFA
- 1990: Ein Grieche aus Mecklenburg – Heinrich Schliemann (Armin Georgi) DEFA/ETR Athen/DFF
- Berlin unter den Alliierten (Irmgard von zur Mühlen) Chronos-Film
- Der Todeskampf der Reichshauptstadt (Bengt von zur Mühlen) Chronos-Film

=== Radio play music ===
- 1966: Das wahre Himmelsblau Umihiko Ito/Maria Diedrichs (Regie: Uwe Haacke)
- 1966: Die Geisterkur Hilde Kneip (Flora Hoffmann)
- 1967: Die weiße Schlange Brüder Grimm/Siegfried Pfaff (Uwe Haacke)
- 1969: Claude Prin: Potemkin 68 – Regie: Edgar Kaufmann (Hörspiel – Rundfunk der DDR)
- 1969: Wolfgang Graetz/Joachim Seyppel: Was ist ein Weihbischof? Oder Antworten zur Akte Defregger – Regie: Edgar Kaufmann (Hörspiel – Rundfunk der DDR)
- 1970: Bodo Schulenburg: Der Nachtigallenstern – Regie: Christa Kowalski (Kinderhörspiel – Rundfunk der DDR)
- 1970: Wolfgang Kießling: Es gibt nur einen Weg – Regie: Maritta Hübner (Kinderhörspiel – Rundfunk der DDR)
- 1970: Anita Heiden-Berndt: Licht in der Stanitza – Regie: Manfred Täubert (Kinderhörspiel – Rundfunk der DDR)
- 1971: Der Physiker und die Nixe Boris Djačenko (Werner Grunow)
- 1972: Czesław Chruszczewski: Fünf treffen sich in Konin – Regie: Peter Groeger (Hörspiel – Rundfunk der DDR)
- 1972: Chitra Rabindranath Tagore (Peter Groeger)
- 1974: Ján Milczák: Die letzten Drei – Regie: Helmut Hellstorff (Hörspiel – Rundfunk der DDR)
- 1975: Linda Teßmer: Der Fall Tina Bergemann – Regie: Hannelore Solter (Hörspiel – Rundfunk der DDR)
- 1976: Das Erwachen Luiz Francisco Rebello (Helmut Hellstorff)
- 1977: Die Roboterfalle Bernd Ulbrich (Werner Grunow)
- 1979: Pintlaschk und das goldene Schaf Jurij Koch (Christa Kowalski)
- 1980: Der gestreifte Kater und die Schwalbe Sinhá Jorge Amado/Waltraud Jähnichen
- 1980: Maria Stuart Friedrich Schiller/Werner Grunow (Werner Grunow)
- 1981: Hochzeit vorübergehend; Das Sommerpferdchen – Lothar Walsdorf (Ingeborg Medschinski)
- 1981: Gegeben am Tage Schlag zu! Bodo Schulenburg (Klaus Zippel)
- 1982: Alle Mäuse mögen Käse Gyula Urbán (Ingeborg Medschinski)
- 1982: Die unselige Reise von Yanacocha in die Zukunft Manuel Scorza (Ingeborg Medschinski)
- 1983: Das unglückliche Unglück Stephan Göritz (Uwe Haacke)
- 1984: Klopfzeichen Günther Weisenborn/Hans Bräunlich (Fritz Göhler)
- 1984: Zaunkönig Grimm brothers/Ria Zenker (Uwe Haacke)
- 1984: Die Höhle von Steenfoll Wilhelm Hauff/Christian Noack (Uwe Haacke)
- 1985: Die Nixe Grimm brothers/Wolfgang Mahlow (Manfred Täubert) [DDR-Hörerpreis]
- 1985: Die Bremer Stadtmusikanten Grimm brothers/Thomas Rosenlöcher (Maritta Hübner)
- 1986: Der wundersame Aufstieg von Priff und Praff oder Der Aufruhr um den Junker Ernst Jakob Wassermann/Klaus-Dieter Müller (Manfred Täubert)
- 1986: Jeder stirbt für sich allein Hans Fallada/Ralph Knebel (Werner Grunow)
- 1986: Gavroche Victor Hugo/Erhard Preuk (Klaus Zippel)
- 1987: Der Frieder und das Katherlieschen Grimm brothers/Erika Wollanik (Manfred Täubert)
- 1987: Die Frühlingsgeige Marion Seelig (Manfred Täubert)
- 1987: Der Junge aus Marmor Hans Christian Andersen/Norbert Nieczerowski (Christa Kowalski)
- 1988: Der Orakelspruch Miriam Margraf (Maritta Hübner)
- 1989: Der kleine Prinz Antoine de Saint-Exupéry/Stephan Göritz
- 1991: Eine Wolke wie aus Zuckerwatte Kerry Crabbe

=== Radio plays ===
- Die Stunde des Fisches oder Der kluge Mohammed (1974)

=== Publications ===
- Zwischen Last und Straße, Gedichte, Verlag Volk u. Welt Berlin, 1960
- Die Stunde in Peyresq, Roman, Union-Verlag Berlin, 1966
- Zwischen Last und Straße. Eine Nachlese [Gedichte aus dem Nachlass], Neu-Ulm 2013
