= Wolfgang Pasquay =

German pianist and composer

Wolfgang Pasquay (10 February 1931 – 8 April 2006) was a German classical pianist, composer and music educator.

== Youth ==
Born in Cottbus, Pasquay received piano lessons as a child. From 1941 he attended the Musisches Gymnasium Frankfurt, where he studied piano with August Leopolder and conducting and composition with Kurt Thomas. In 1944, at the age of 13, he was awarded the Hall Youth Prize for Composition for his Piano Variations on a Theme by Hugo Distler. In 1945, at the age of 14, he gave his first public performance as a pianist in Stuttgart.

== Pianist ==
In the following three decades Pasquay devoted himself mainly to his career as a pianist. In 1950 he joined forces with Berthold Ende (violin) and Hans Hendler (violoncello) in Düsseldorf to form a piano trio, which performed the entire repertoire for this instrumentation in the following years. Numerous solo performances followed throughout Europe, including in Berlin, London, Vienna and Paris. Pasquay's concert repertoire included the piano concertos by Mozart, Beethoven Brahms, Chopin, Schumann, Grieg, Tchaikovsky, Rachmaninoff, Stravinsky and Bartók as well as pieces by Bach, Schubert, Debussy, Franck, Mussorgsky and other composers.

A resident of Solingen since 1954, where he taught piano, he married the cellist Liselotte Hauptner in 1955.

Pasquay died in Solingen at the age of 75.

== Composer ==
From the 1980s onwards, Pasquay turned more strongly to composition. He wrote works for orchestral instrumentation, chamber music and, especially at the suggestion of his wife, numerous works for several cellos, above all 33 canons and concert canons and the figurine suite. This artistic genre, invented by Pasquay, is an evening-length work for at least 20 cellists who slip into musical masks - figurines - and present their musical thoughts in costume and transform them into pantomime.

Pasquay's main work is the Peace Oratorio. The convinced pacifist Pasquay combined quotations from the peace writings of Erasmus of Rotterdam and excerpts from poems by Bertolt Brecht into an impressive appeal for peace in this multi-movement work for choir and orchestra. He himself conducted numerous performances of the work between 1988 and 2003, including in Düsseldorf, Bonn and Dresden.

== Recordings ==
- Wolfgang Pasquay (piano): Aspekte der Romantik. Klaviermusik von Franck, Saint-Saëns, Schumann, Chopin and Tchaikovski. (1986) con brio (LP)
- Wolfgang Pasquay: Friedensoratorium. Erasmus-Chor und -Orchester Rheinland (2003) Kreuzberg Records kr 10086 (CD, Recording of a concert in the Altenberger Dom 25 November 2001).

== Work ==
- Serenade für Flöte und zwei Violoncelli (1982)
- Figurinen-Suite for Violoncello Ensemble (1987)
- Andante quasi una Fantasia for flute and two violoncellos (1990)
- Konzert für Streichorchester (1994)
- Trio in Memoria di un amico for string trio (2000)
- Die Welt der Kanons (Canons for variable cello ensembles, composed from 1982 onwards, published in 2003)
- Friedensoratorium. Oratorium gegen den Krieg nach Worten von Erasmus von Rotterdam und Bertolt Brecht (written since 1988, initially under the title "Erasmus Oratorio"; complete version in 2003)
