= George Maran =

American singer

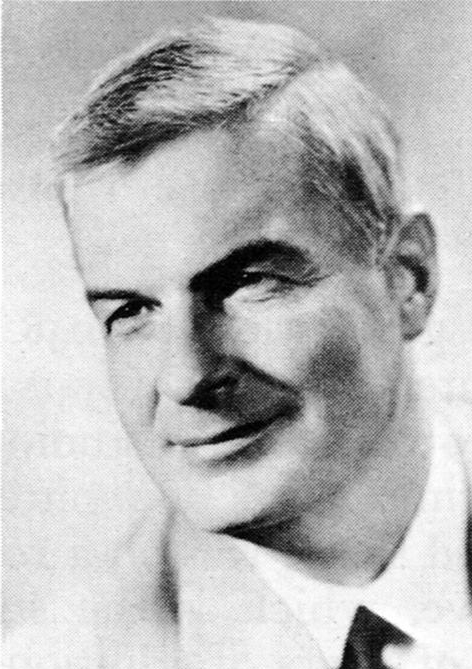
George Maran - Harvard University Yearbook 1948

George Alfred Maran (July 25, 1926 – Nov 26, 2011) was an American opera, oratorio, and concert tenor. Born near Boston, Massachusetts. Maran attended Harvard University where he and his voice came to the attention of people such as Leonard Bernstein and Paul Hindemith. He first drew international attention when he won the “Mozart-Medaille”(Mozart Medal) from the Mozarteum International Foundation in Salzburg in 1956 on Mozart’s 200th birthday. The same year, and the next forty years thereafter, he was a soloist at the Opera in Darmstadt, Germany. Even so, he continued singing all over Europe and the United States, the world premiere of A Midsummer Night's Dream (opera) with Benjamin Britten conducting as a prime example. He has sung many wide-ranging and varied genres as soloist in opera, operetta, oratorio, and on the concert stage.

== Early life ==
Maran was born in Attleboro, Massachusetts, the younger of 2 children. His father: Jacob C. Maran (1899) born Agop Marangossian (clerk/jeweler) (naturalized 1923) was an Armenian from Smyrna (now Turkey) who spoke 7 languages fluently, “I don’t know much about him, said Maran, he left when I was 7”. His mother: born Persis M. Weeman (c. 1903), gave piano and voice lessons. His great-grandfather, Orin Weeman (c. 1844), and grandfather: Walter O. Weeman (c. 1863) were well-known violin makers from ”America’s oldest violin making family” at the time. It was the musical influence of his grandfather Weeman and his Mother that started him on his path.

== Harvard days 1944–1948 ==
At age 20 Maran joined the Harvard Glee Club. He met Leonard Bernstein sometime between then and his graduation. “He heard me at one or more of my concerts and liked my voice" Maran said. In the same way Maran met Paul Hindemith, also through attending his lectures. Maran graduated from Harvard University in 1948(47).

== Personal life ==
On September 15, 1950, Maran married Edit Engel, a Jewish refugee who was studying medicine at Tufts College. They had two children: Elizabeth Ann (Elisha) and Joseph. Maran died, aged 85 in Darmstadt, on November 26, 2011, from heart and cardiovascular disease. His grave is planned to be located at the Waldfriedhof in Darmstadt.

== Professional life ==
=== Salzburg ===
In late 1950 the Marans moved (in large part through arrangements made by Edit Maran) to Salzburg, they lived in the family house of Herbert Feuerstein (then age 13). Maran studied church music under Domkapellmeister Joseph Messner; Mozart operas under Professor Dr. B. Paumgartner, and sang in the Salzburg Cathedral as solo Tenor for 5 years. In 1954 Feuerstein wrote thfree "Dehmel-Gedichte" (text from Richard Dehmel) songs for him. The songs themselves were first publicly performed at Maran's 80th birthday celebration at Staatstheater Darmstadt with Feuerstein himself playing the piano.

=== Salzburger Festspiele 1952–1971 ===
Salzburger Festspiele Archiv

Date	Work1	Work2	Conductor
17. August 1952	Anton Bruckner "Tota pulchra Motette"		Joseph Messner
02. August 1953	Franz Schubert "Große Messe in E flat Major"		Joseph Messner
09. August 1953	W. A. Mozart "Krönungsmesse" KV 317		Joseph Messner
20. August 1954	Giovanni Battista Pergolesi "Stabat mater"	W. A. Mozart "Spatzenmesse" KV 220	Joseph Messner
27. August 1954	W. A. Mozart "Requiem in D-Minor" KV 626		Joseph Messner
03. August 1955	Joseph Haydn "Missa in tempore belli"(Paukenmesse) Hob. XXII Nr. 9		Joseph Messner
13. August 1955	W. A. Mozart "Messe in C-Minor" KV 427		Bernhard Paumgartner
27. August 1955	W. A. Mozart "Requiem in D-Minor" KV 626		Joseph Messner
03. August 1956	"CAMERATA ACADEMICA DES MOZARTEUMS"		Bernhard Paumgartner
11. August 1956	W. A. Mozart "Messe in C-Minor" KV 427		Bernhard Paumgartner
24. August 1956	W. A. Mozart "Vesperae solennes de confessore" KV 339	W. A. Mozart "Spatzenmesse" KV 220	Joseph Messner
17. August 1957	W. A. Mozart "Messe in C-Minor" KV 427		Bernhard Paumgartner
29. August 1957	W. A. Mozart "Requiem in D-Minor" KV 626		Joseph Messner
16. August 1958	W. A. Mozart "Messe in C-Minor" KV 427		Bernhard Paumgartner
31. August 1958	W. A. Mozart "Requiem in D-Minor" KV 626		Joseph Messner
08. August 1959	W. A. Mozart "Messe in C-Minor" KV 427		Ernst Hinreiner
23. August 1959	W. A. Mozart "Requiem in D-Minor" KV 626		Joseph Messner
31. Juli 1960	Joseph Haydn "Messe in D-Minor" Hob. XXII Nr. 11	Joseph Haydn "Missa in angutiis"; Joseph Haydn" Nelsonmesse"	Joseph Messner
13. August 1960	W. A. Mozart "Messe in C-Minor" KV 427		Bernhard Paumgartner
12. August 1961	W. A. Mozart "Messe in C-Minor" KV 427		Bernhard Paumgartner
06. August 1962	SALZBURGER RUNDFUNK- UND MOZARTEUMCHOR		Ernst Hinreiner
11. August 1962	W. A. Mozart "Messe in C-Minor" KV 427		Bernhard Paumgartner
12. August 1962	W. A. Mozart "Vesperae solennes de confessore" KV 339	W. A. Mozart "Krönungsmesse" KV 317	Joseph Messner
10. August 1963	W. A. Mozart "Messe in C-Minor" KV 427		Bernhard Paumgartner
08. August 1964	W. A. Mozart "Messe in C-Minor" KV 427		Bernhard Paumgartner
14. August 1965	W. A. Mozart "Messe in C-Minor" KV 427		Bernhard Paumgartner
13. August 1966	W. A. Mozart "Messe in C-Minor" KV 427		Bernhard Paumgartner
12. August 1967	W. A. Mozart "Messe in C-Minor" KV 427		Bernhard Paumgartner
10. August 1968	W. A. Mozart "Messe in C-Minor" KV 427		Bernhard Paumgartner
09. August 1969	W. A. Mozart "Messe in C-Minor" KV 427		Bernhard Paumgartner
08. August 1970	W. A. Mozart "Messe in C-Minor" KV 427		Bernhard Paumgartner
14. August 1971	W. A. Mozart "Messe in C-Minor" KV 427		Ernst Hinreiner

=== Staatstheater Darmstadt 1956–1996 ===
In the 40 years that Mr. Maran was at Staatstheater Darmstadt, he sang so much, and in so many genres, ... Maran started in Darmstadt with the premiere of Mozart’s “Titus” in the title part. Marans artistic collaboration with Harro Dicks was the driving force for the Monteverdi revival which had its beginning in Darmstadt. He starred Il Ritorno d Ulysse and the Coronation of Poppea. His creative work with Hans Drewanz was fruitful and rich, culminating in Britten's Death in Venice, produced in 1980 by Kurt Horres. His characterization of Aschenbach was celebrated as one of intense and unusual expressiveness.

=== Aldeburgh Festival ===
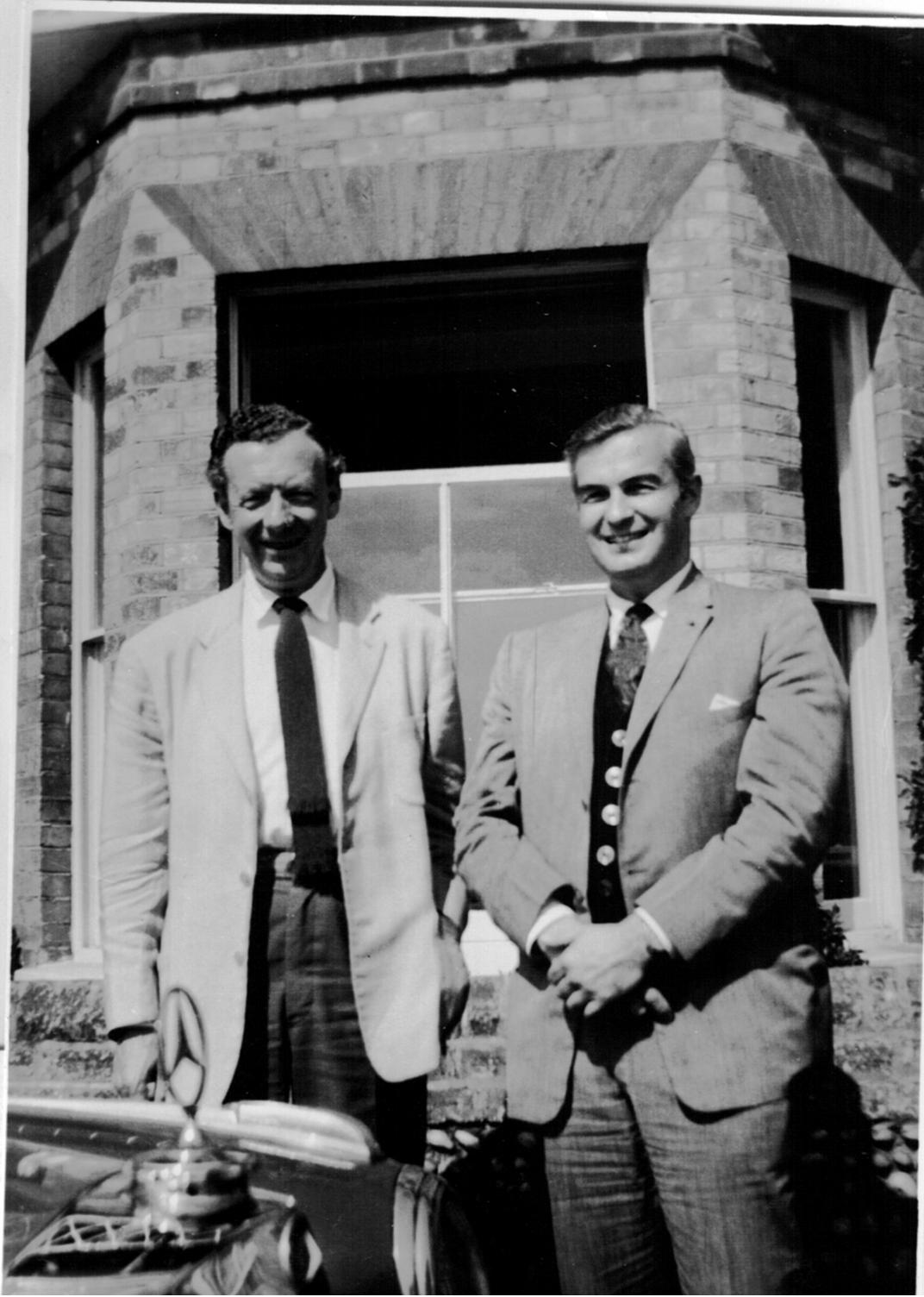
Benjamin Britten & George Maran 1960

A Midsummer Night's Dream was first performed on 11 June 1960 at the Jubilee Hall, Aldeburgh, UK as part of the Aldeburgh Festival. Conducted by the composer, it was directed by the choreographer John Cranko. Maran played the part of Lysander. Maran is fond of saying that Britten wrote the part for him, which to a certain degree is true, since Britten asked Maran to sing the part after hearing his voice and Maran was in on the final production preparations. He has many memories of his times at the "Red House". In subsequent performances the role was sung by Peter Pears who played the part of Flute, a bellows-mender in this production.

=== Other Engagements ===
Guest appearances in Frankfurt, Hamburg, Zurich, Amsterdam, at New York City Opera (Belmonte opposite Phyllis Curtin, 1958) and Fests, such as the Netherlands, Strasbourg, Schwetzingen, Kranichstein, etc.

== Awards ==
- 1956 – Mozart-Medal in Salzburg
- 1996 – "Ehrenmitglied"(Honored Member) from Staatstheater Darmstadt. This award has been given to only 4 others to date.

== Recordings ==
- Benjamin Britten, The rape of Lucretia, The English Opera Group Orchestra cond. by Charles Mackerras
- George Frideric Handel, Messiah, London Philharmonic Orchestra cond. by Sir Adrian Boult
- George Frideric Handel, Rei Ricardo I, rei da Inglaterra, Südwestdeutsches Kammerorchester Pforzheim cond. by Günther Weißenborn
- Bertus van Lier, The Holy song, Concertgebouw Orchestra cond. by Bernard Haitink
- Felix Mendelssohn-Bartholdy, Elijah, London Philharmonic Orchestra cond. by Josef Krips
- Wolfgang Amadeus Mozart, Messe c-moll KV 427, Mozarteum-Orchester cond. by Bernhard Paumgartner
- Wolfgang Amadeus Mozart, La finta semplice, Camerata Salzburg cond. by Bernhard Paumgartner
- Wolfgang Amadeus Mozart, Zaide, and excerpts from Lo sposo deluso and L'Oca del Cairo, Camerata Salzburg cond. by Bernhard Paumgartner
- Ralph Vaughan Williams, On Wenlock edge, Ivor Newton, piano; London String Quartet
