= Musisches Gymnasium Leipzig =

German school music (1941–1945)

Coordinates: 51.3328°N 12.3539°E

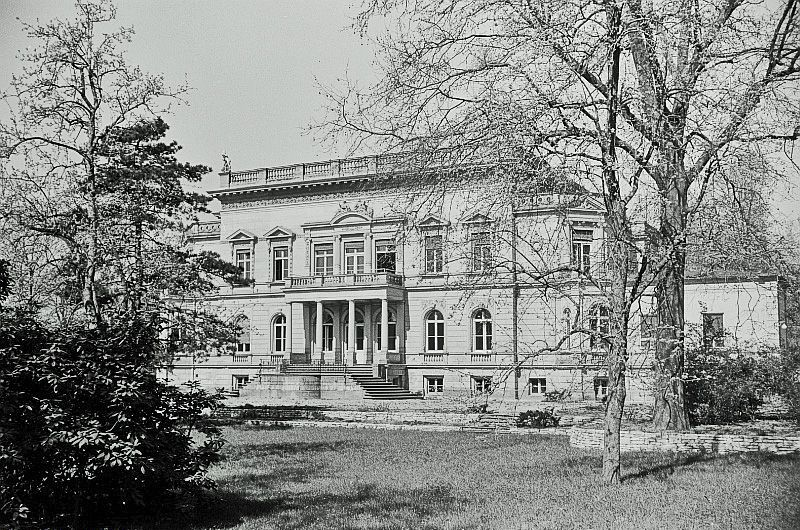
The building of the former Musisches Gymnasium Leipzig in 1952

The Musische Gymnasium Leipzig was an educational institution with an artistic orientation that existed from 1941 to 1945 and led to a university entrance qualification.

== Location ==
The Musische Gymnasium Leipzig was housed in the Villa Gebhardt. The building had been constructed in 1880/1881 by the architect Arwed Roßbach for the publishing bookseller Leopold Gebhardt, the owner of J.-M. Gebhardt's Verlag. The Jewish Gebhardt family had lost the property as part of the Aryanisation by the National Socialists. After the Second World War, the building was used for medical purposes and today, with a modern extension, is the senior citizens' residential home Stadtpalais.

Due to the bombing of Leipzig, the Musisches Gymnasium was moved to Nossen in 1944 until it was disbanded.

== History ==
The Musisches Gymnasium Frankfurt was founded in 1939 as the first school of its kind in Germany. The director was the later Thomaskantor Kurt Thomas. The Reich Ministry of Education in Berlin had technical supervision.

In September 1941, the second school of this kind followed in Leipzig. As in Frankfurt, the intention was to exert political influence on arts education. The opening ceremony took place on 28 September 1941 in the presence of Reich Education Minister Bernhard Rust. In the report on this in the Leipzig Yearbook 1942 the Musisches Gymnasium is placed in the same category as the Adolf Hitler Schools and the National Political Institutes of Education (Napola) and ascribed the task of "educating a new class of leaders in the field of art". With "soldierly-musical" education as the school's goal, the Gymnasium was an all-boys school with an attached boarding school. For the year 1942, 110 pupils in seven classes were enrolled.

The choice of Leipzig as the second school location was based on the intention of removing the Thomanerchor as far as possible from ecclesiastical influence and placing it under state control, but this was ultimately unsuccessful. A first step in this direction was the appointment of Thomaskantor Günther Ramin as musical director of the school. However, the headmaster became a teacher, Richter, who settled the administrative issues with the school office, bypassing Ramin.

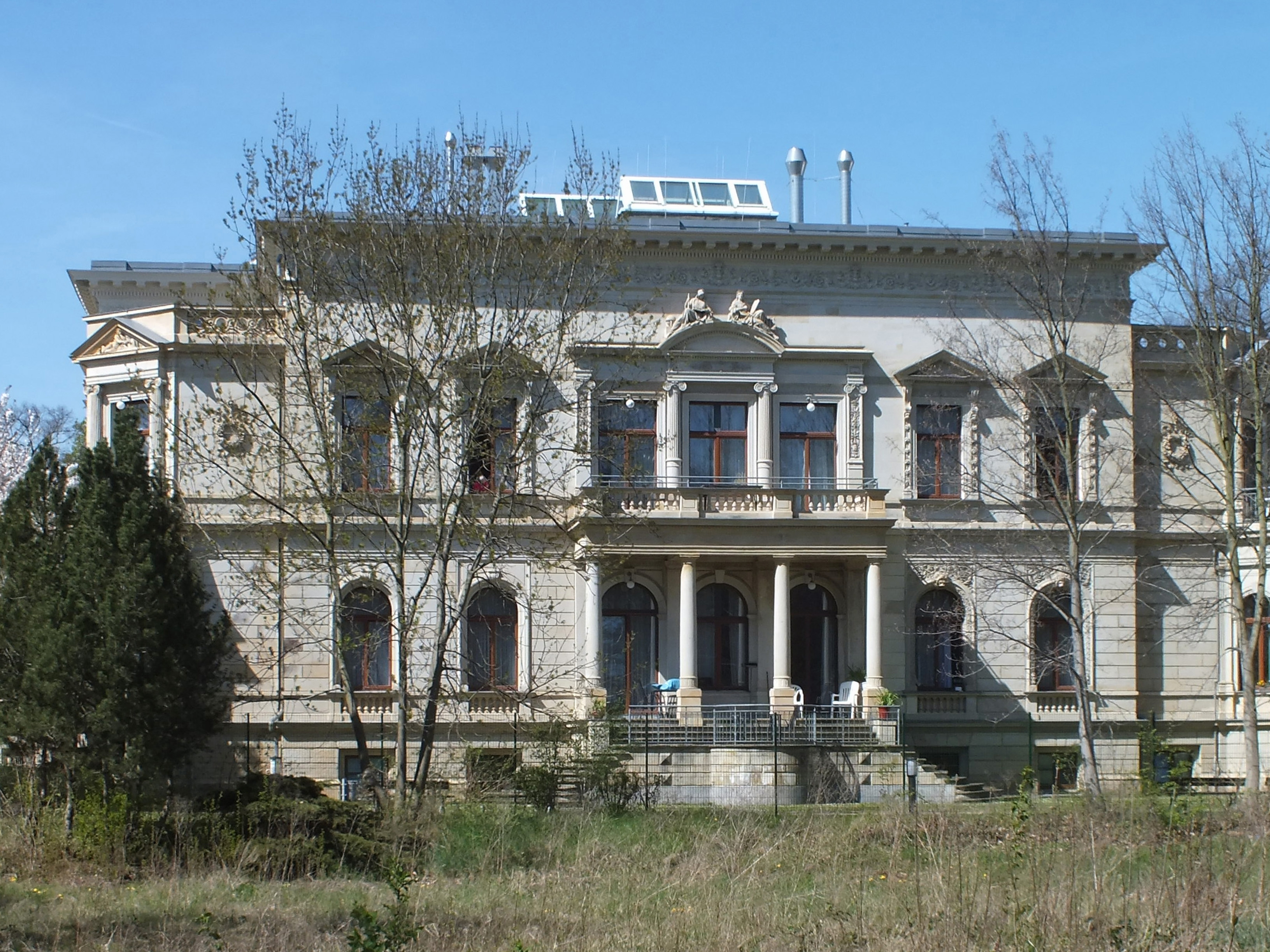
The building in 2015, West and South sides

In February 1943, Günther Ramin resigned as artistic director of the Musisches Gymnasium Leipzig due to the distribution of competences. The succession of the artistic director was not clarified almost until the dissolution of the school. Numerous composers and music teachers were approached, but they all declined, among them Hugo Distler, Walter Kolneder, Fritz Reuter, Cesar Bresgen, Karl Höller and Hans Chemin-Petit. Finally, in August 1944, Johann Nepomuk David took over alongside his directorship at the University of Music and Theatre Leipzig. However, both institutions were already in alternative quarters by then.

The Musisches Gymnasium was discontinued after the end of the war.

== Notable students ==
- Hans Bünte, musician and writer
- Günter Bust, music educator and composer
- Saschko Gawriloff, violinist and violin educator
- Eberhard Grünenthal, flutist and academic teacher
- Harald Hellmich, painter and graphist
- Günter Kochan, composer
- Egmar Ponndorf, stone sculptor
- Arnd Schultheiß, painter and graphist
- Siegfried Kurz, conductor and composer
- Siegfried Stöckigt, pianist
