= Helmut Kretschmar =

German classical tenor (born 1928)

Helmut Kretschmar (born 3 February 1928) is a German classical tenor who spent most of his career performing in concerts and recitals with major orchestras and at important music festivals internationally. Although he focused his career mainly within the concert repertoire, Kretschmar did appear two times on the opera stage, notably singing in the world premiere of Arnold Schoenberg's Moses und Aron in 1954. Possessing a rich and warm lyric tenor voice, Kretschmar excelled in the concert repertoire of Johann Sebastian Bach, George Frideric Handel, Joseph Haydn, and Felix Mendelssohn. Also an admired interpreter of Lieder, Kretschmar performed and recorded a number of works by Franz Schubert, Robert Schumann, and Hugo Wolf.

== Biography ==
Kretschmar was born in Kleve (Niederrhein). He studied at the Musisches Gymnasium Frankfurt with Kurt Thomas and Hans Emge followed by further studies at the Musikhochschule Detmold under Professor Frederick Husler . He won first prize in the singing competition for the German colleges of music in 1953. That same year, he embarked on a career as a concert tenor, often appearing in the oratorios and other concert works of Mendelssohn and Haydn. He sang the role of the Youth in the world premiere of Arnold Schoenberg's Moses und Aron on the 12 March 1954 under conductor Hans Rosbaud. His only other opera role was as Florestan in Beethoven's Fidelio which he recorded. In 1958 he won the Big Art Prize of the Country North-Westphalia.

In 1960, he became a lecturer at the Musikhochschule Detmold, becoming a full professor in 1961, a position he held for several decades. Not too long after he joined the faculty, Kretschmar met pianist Renate Fischer, also a professor at Detmold, whom he married. Between 1960 and 1962, he sang at several important music festivals where he excelled in the works of Handel and Bach, including the Berliner Festspiele, the Bach Festival in Lüneburg, the Bach Festival in Heidelberg, and the Göttingen International Handel Festival among others. This was soon followed by performances with major orchestras and major concert halls both in Germany and on the international stage, including appearances in Berlin, Düsseldorf, Cologne, Paris, Madrid, London, India, South Korea, the Philippines and Sri Lanka. In addition to Handel and Bach, Kretschmar's recital and concert repertoire included many works by Franz Schubert, Robert Schumann, Hugo Wolf and Claude Debussy. He often appeared in Lieder recitals with his wife as his accompanist before his retirement.

Kretschmar made many recordings during his career, including performances of Bach's St Matthew Passion, Christmas Oratorio, and Mass in B minor, Beethoven's Missa solemnis, Haydn's The Seasons, and Schubert's Mass in A flat major among many others. He has recorded for the Marken, Columbia, Decca, DGG, L'Oiseau Lyre, Vox, Philips, Discophiles Français, and Edition Schwann music labels.
