= Paul Walter Fürst =

Austrian composer

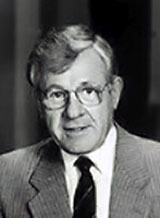
Paul Walter Fürst

Paul Walter Fürst (25 April 1926 – 28 February 2013) was an Austrian musician and composer. He was also president of the AKM Authors, Composers and Music Publishers (AKM) since 1998 and for many years managing director and president of the Österreichischen Interpretengesellschaft (OESTIG).

Furthermore, Fürst was solo violist with the Tonkünstler Orchestra (1952–1954), with the Munich Philharmonic (1954–1961) and from 1961 to 1990 he played in the Vienna State Opera Orchestra. From 1962, he also performed with the Vienna Philharmonic.

== Life ==
Fürst was born in Vienna, the son of the lawyer Rudolf Fürst and his wife Anna. In his childhood, he first learned the violin and piano, played in the children's orchestra and took part in various competitions.

Fürst attended the Musisches Gymnasium Frankfurt, where he completed his training in tuba, trombone, score playing and in rhythm and ear training. He also participated in the school choir. He made his first contacts with composing through the director of the grammar school, Kurt Thomas, who taught him the first compositional basics. His acquaintance with Hugo Distler and his works awakened in him the definite desire to compose.

Fürst returned to Vienna in 1945 and studied there a year later violin (Willi Boskovsky), piano (Hermann Schwermann), harmony (Joseph Marx) and improvisation at the University of Music and Performing Arts Vienna. At the same time, he had occasional lessons in composition with Alfred Uhl.

After successfully completing his studies in 1952, Fürst became principal violist with the Tonkünstler-Orchester Niederösterreich in the same year until 1954 and in the following years with the Munich Philharmonic (1954–1961) and the Vienna State Opera Orchestra (1961–1990). From 1969 to 1982 and from 1984 to 1990, he was managing director of the Vienna Philharmonic. Until his death, he held many offices, including president of the OESTIG and the AKM.

On the evening of 28 February 2013, Fürst died of cancer at the age of 86.

== Major performances ==
- Farbspiele op. 38
- Het Orgel is een belt
- Dorian Grey op. 35
- Orchesterstron IV
- Dorian's Calling op. 39
- Seis Ventanas op. 83
- Sabado op. 22
- Violatüre op. 69
- Bavy – Concerto
- Catalina Homar

In addition, he received commissioned works for the Internationale Stiftung Mozarteum, the Wiener Festwochen, the Salzburg Festival and the Brucknerfest.

== Awards and honors ==
- 1970: Conferment of the title of professor
- 1970: Encouragement prize of the City of Vienna
- 1980: Großes Decoration of Honour for Services to the Republic of Austria
- 1982: Ehrenzeichen des Landes Salzburg
- 1990: Förderungspreis des Landes Niederösterreich
- 1994: Musikpreis der Stadt Wien
- 1996: Golden Ehrenzeichen der Stadt Gänserndorf
- 2001: Golden Ehrenzeichen für Verdienste um das Land Wien
- 2005: Niederösterreichischer Kulturpreis (Würdigungspreis).

== Functions ==
- 1969–1982 and 1984–1990: Managing Director of the Vienna Philharmonic Orchestra
- from 1970: President and managing director of OESTIG
- from 1978: President of the Trade Union for Art, Media, Sport, Liberal Professions
- from 1984: Managing Director of LSG (Wahrnehmung von Leistungsschutzrechten GmbH, Vienna)
- from 1989: Vice-president of the International Music Union
- from 1998: President of AKM (State Authorised Society of Authors, Composers and Music Publishers)
