= Otto Nitze =

German composer

Otto Nitze (20 September 1924 – 8 May 1988) was a German musician and composer, who also published essential compositions under the pseudonym 'Tom Dawitt'.

== Life ==
Born in Artern, Nitze came from an old family of musicians. At the age of five he received his first violin lessons from his father, from the age of seven from the 1st concertmaster of the Städtische Bühnen zu Erfurt, at the age of nine he became a pupil of the director of the Musikhochschule zu Sondershausen, Professor Carl Corbach, at the age of ten Nitze was admitted to the conservatory after being granted special permission ("Lex Nitze").

He then attended the Musisches Gymnasium Frankfurt, where his teachers were Professor Kurt Thomas, August Leopolder and Wolfgang Riehm. Nitze received art lessons from the Idar-Oberstein artist Max Rupp, who was a teacher at the Musisches Gymnasium. He completed his music studies as a certified bandmaster. After the end of the war, Nitze became the youngest Kapellmeister and composer of music for plays at the theatre in Eisleben at the age of 23. As municipal music director, he directed the music school that his grandfather had founded and was also the leader of a professional orchestra. In 1947, he moved to the West and first worked here as a freelancer. In 1950, he took over the direction of the Musikverein 1861 Idar-Oberstein, followed by other wind orchestras and choirs in the city and district.

In 1957, Nitze was the main initiator for the foundation of the youth harmony orchestra of the Musikverein 1861 Idar-Oberstein, which also played a leading role in the foundation of other youth orchestras. In November 1961, he moved to Schramberg/Black Forest as Municipal Music Director and teacher at the University Institute of Music in Trossingen. In 1965, Nitze returned to Idar-Oberstein to rebuild and revive musical youth work. In 1967, Nitze founded the Municipal Young Brass School, followed in 1968 by the founding of the Birkenfeld District Youth Orchestra, based in Idar-Oberstein.

The aim of both orchestras and Nitze's special concern was the intensive musical promotion of young people and youth work. Nitze achieved great success at national and international music competitions, especially with the District Youth Orchestra, and travelled with this orchestra to many European countries, Israel, the US and Canada. Nitze conducted both orchestras until his death in 1988. He had been married to Lilli, née Elges, since 1951. They had one daughter.

Nitze, who had been a full-time music teacher at the Idar-Oberstein secondary school since 1968, was a member of the cultural committee of the town of Idar-Oberstein, of the Birkenfeld district music association (district music association conductor), of the state music advisory board and was active as an adjudicator at the federal level. For his services to music and youth work as well as his artistic activities, he received the Federal Cross of Merit of the Federal Republic of Germany, the Golden Badge of Honour of the city of Idar-Oberstein, the coat of arms plates of the city of Idar-Oberstein and the district of Birkenfeld, the Peter Cornelius Plaque of the state government of Rhineland-Palatinate, the Croix de Mérite de la Confédération Internationale des Sociétés Musicales, the Federal Promotional Medal in Silver and Gold of the Federation of German Wind and Folk Music Associations and that of the Landesmusikverband Rheinland-Pfalz, the Conductor's Badge of Honour in Silver and Gold as well as the Golden Town Hall Man of the City of Vienna. He is still the only honorary conductor of the Musikverein 1861 Idar-Oberstein.

Nitze was also very successful as a composer. Already in 1965 he received the 1st prize for his work Prolog for symphonic wind orchestra. In 1979, Nitze composed the state anthem Viva la musica for the first state music festival in Rhineland-Palatinate. His composition Leuchtender Tag was played at the papal reception of Pope Pope John Paul II in Altötting in 1980.

Nitze died in Idar-Oberstein at the age of 63.

== Bibliography ==
- Wolfgang Suppan, Armin Suppan: Das Neue Lexikon des Blasmusikwesens, 4th edition, Freiburg-Tiengen, Blasmusikverlag Schulz GmbH, 1994, ISBN 3-923058-07-1
- Paul E. Bierley, William H. Rehrig: The heritage encyclopedia of band music : composers and their music, Westerville, Ohio: Integrity Press, 1991, ISBN 0-918048-08-7
- Paul Frank, Burchard Bulling, Florian Noetzel, Helmut Rosner: Kurzgefasstes Tonkünstler Lexikon – Zweiter Teil: Ergänzungen und Erweiterungen seit 1937, 15. Aufl., Wilhelmshaven: Heinrichshofen, vol. 1: A-K. 1974. ISBN 3-7959-0083-2; vol/ 2: L-Z. 1976. ISBN 3-7959-0087-5
