= Nitze (surname) =

Nitze is a surname. Notable people with the surname include:

- Maximilian Nitze (1848–1906), German urologist
- Otto Nitze (1924–1988), German musician and composer
- Paul Nitze (1907–2004), American statesman
