= Johannes Schäfer =

German organist (1928–1996)

Johannes Schäfer (20 January 1928 – 30 June 1996) was a German organist. He became known above all for his concerts and his work as an organ teacher.

== Life ==
Born in Weißenfels, Schäfer attended the Musisches Gymnasium Frankfurt as a boarding school student from 1939 to 1945 under the direction of Kurt Thomas. He received piano lessons and learned the flute as a secondary instrument. As a member of the choir, he took part in numerous concert tours through Germany. Schäfer regretted very much at that time that organ lessons could not be taken at the Musisches Gymnasium because the organ had always been his favourite instrument. In April 1945, the Musisches Gymnasium was dissolved.

Schäfer then made his way home on foot with a schoolmate. In July 1945 he arrived at his family's home in Altenweddingen. At this time he took his first organ lessons with the cathedral organist Gerhard Bremsteller in Magdeburg. From October 1945, he attended the municipal secondary school for boys in Schönebeck, where he passed the Abitur in September 1946.

From 1947 to 1950 he studied church music at the Leipzig State Academy of Music "Mendelssohn Academy" and passed the A examination on 12 August 1950 with an overall grade of I. His teachers included Günther Ramin (organ), Robert Köbler (piano) and Johannes Weyrauch (music theory).

From 1950 to 1993, he was cantor and organist at the Predigerkirche Erfurt. Schäfer initiated the construction of the new organ, which was completed in 1977. Together with the organ builders of the Firma Schuke in Potsdam, he created an instrument that was ideal for him. "It is a part of me," says Schäfer. "Unlike many others, all composers can be played on his organ in an acceptable compromise," Schäfer told during an interview with the Erfurter Stadtanzeiger.

In 1972, Schäfer established regular organ concert series in the Predigerkirche. The concerts were not only performed by himself, but also by other renowned organists from Germany and abroad. He made a point of including not only romantic but also contemporary works by, for example, Johannes Weyrauch, Petr Eben, György Ligeti, Johann Nepomuk David, Hugo Distler and Sigfrid Karg-Elert in the programmes.

From 1956, Schäfer was a lecturer in organ playing at the Halle Protestant Church Music School. From 1978, he also had a teaching post for organ at the "Franz Liszt" College of Music in Weimar and from 1982 at the University of Music and Theatre Leipzig. His most important organ students included Rolf Henry Kunz, Matthias Jacob, Emil Handke, Almuth Reuther, Michael-Christfried Winkler, Wolfgang Kupke and Matthias Dreißig.

Throughout his professional career, Schäfer performed in organ concerts in Germany and abroad, including at the Gewandhaus Leipzig, the Schauspielhaus Berlin, the Semperoper Dresden, the St. Thomas Church, Leipzig, in the Federal Republic of Germany and in Poland. In addition to numerous radio recordings, he also made two records. The Passacaglia and Fugue in C minor, BWV 582 by Johann Sebastian Bach was recorded for the GDR television on the organ of the Predigerkirche Erfurt (broadcast 26 December 1983).

His particularly revered composers included Johann Sebastian Bach, Max Reger and Johann Nepomuk David. Schäfer was a member of the International Johann Nepomuk David Society. He not only played all of David's organ works, but also presented them in lectures.

Schäfer was married and father of five children. He died in Erfurt at the age of 68.

== Honours ==
- Kirchenmusikdirektor.
- Außerplanmäßiger Professor.

== Compositions ==
In Leichte Choralvorspiele zum Evangelischen Kirchen-Gesangbuch. Evangelische Verlagsanstalt, Berlin (East) 1976.

- 243 Durch Adams Fall ist ganz verderbt (Vorspiel, Intonation, Orgelchoral).
- 247 Herzlich lieb hab ich dich, o Herr (Intonation, Orgelchoral).
- 339 Die helle Sonn leucht’ jetzt herfür (Vorspiel I, Intonation).
- 390 Wach auf, wach auf, du deutsches Land (Vorspiel, Intonation, Orgelchoral).

== Recordings ==
- Bach, Orgelwerke 19, Choralbearbeitungen in Kirnbergers Sammlung BWV 690-713. Johannes Schäfer an der Silbermannorgel der Petrikirche zu Freiberg. VEB Deutsche Schallplatten Berlin (DDR) 1971.
- Die Schukeorgel der Predigerkirche zu Erfurt. Johannes Schäfer spielt Werke von Reger, Pachelbel und David. VEB Deutsche Schallplatten Berlin (DDR) 1981.
