= Carl Adolf Martienssen =

German pianist, author, musicologist and music educator

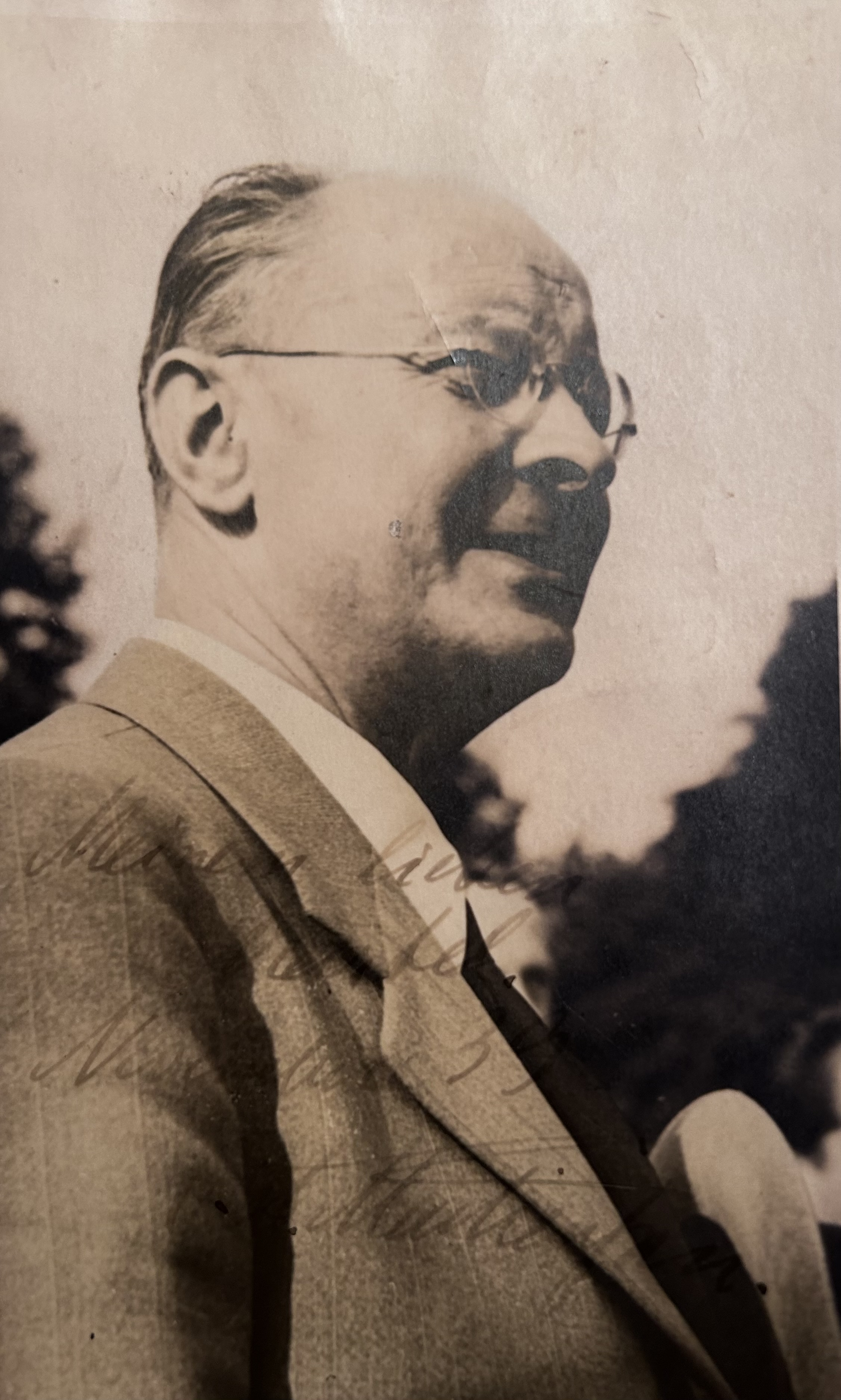
Image of Carl Adolf Martienssen

Carl Adolf Martienssen (6 December 1881 – 1 March 1955) was a German pianist and music educator.

== Life ==
Born in Güstrow, Martienssen came from a large farming family, which apparently only immigrated to Mecklenburg in the generation of his father, the merchant Gottlieb Martienssen. Martienssen was a younger son of his parents, attended the Domschule Güstrow and received his first music education in theory, organ and piano from Johannes Schondorf in his home town. After the Abitur Martienssen studied musical composition with Wilhelm Berger, musicology with Hermann Kretzschmar and piano playing with the Liszt student Karl Klindworth in Berlin, and at the Leipzig Conservatory (today Hochschule für Musik "Hanns Eisler"). He was also a student of Hans Sitt and Arthur Nikisch.

In 1912 Martienssen married the singing teacher Franziska Martienssen-Lohmann. The marriage, which was divorced in 1927, produced two children. (In 1929 Franziska married the concert singer and voice pedagogue Paul Lohmann).

From 1914 Martienssen was piano teacher at the Leipzig Conservatory, where he was appointed professor in 1932. After the Machtergreifung by the Nazis, he belonged to the NSDAP from 1 May 1933 (party number 2.382.346). In 1934 the Kampfbund für deutsche Kultur, led by Alfred Rosenberg, proposed his appointment as professor at the Universität der Künste Berlin, but he received his appointment only in 1935 and then as successor to Edwin Fischer, who had asked to be released from university service in order to concentrate on his concert activities.

After the Second World War, Martienssen was professor at the Musikhochschule in Rostock from 1946 to 1950, before he was appointed to the State Conservatory in East Berlin in 1950 (today Hochschule für Musik "Hanns Eisler").

He became known, among other things, as the author of methodical writings. (1930 Die individuelle Klaviertechnik auf der Grundlage des schöpferischen Klangwillens, 1937 Methodik des individuellen Klavierverrichts, 1954 Schöpferischer Klavierunterricht), which have been published in several editions, and as a responsible editor of the precisely edited Urtext editions of all piano sonatas by Joseph Haydn, Wolfgang Amadeus Mozart, Ludwig van Beethoven, the sonatines by Anton Diabelli, smaller works for piano by Johann Sebastian Bach and piano exercises by Carl Czerny, all of which are published in the Edition Peters of the Leipzig publisher C. F. Peters . In 1912 - this is emphasized in renowned music encyclopedias - he was able to rediscover in Copenhagen the until then lost cantata by Johann Sebastian Bach Mein Herze schwimmt im Blut (BWV 199).

Among his students were the composers Hugo Distler, Georg Trexler, Artur Immisch and Hans Schaeuble, the conductors Sergiu Celibidache and Adolf Fritz Guhl, the pianists Karl-Heinz Schlüter, Carl Seemann, Max Martin Stein, Sebastian Peschko, Erik Then-Bergh and Viktorie Svihlikova, as well as the organists and church choirmaster Thomas-Kantor Kurt Thomas (St. Thomas Church Leipzig), Kreuz-Kantor Herbert Collum (Dresden Church of the Holy Cross), Robert Köbler (University Church Leipzig), Käte van Tricht (Bremen Cathedral), the long-time choral director of the Deutsche Staatsoper Berlin Ernst Stoy and numerous renowned music teachers such as August Leopolder, Ottilie Fröschle and Kurt Hessenberg.

Martienssen died in Berlin at the age of 73.

== Publications ==
- Zur Methodik des Klavierunterrichts. Verlag Peters, Leipzig 1937.
- Die individuelle Klaviertechnik auf der Grundlage des schöpferischen Klangwillens. Verlag Breitkopf & Härtel, Leipzig 1930.
- Schöpferischer Klavierunterricht. Verlag Breitkopf & Härtel, Leipzig 1954. (translated into several languages)
- Beethoven Sonaten für Klavier zu zwei Händen.

== Literature ==
- Thomas Menrath: Das Unlehrbare als methodischer Gegenstand – Studien zu Grundbegriffen der Klaviermethodik von Carl Adolf Martienssen. Wißner Verlag, 2003, ISBN 3-89639-398-7.
