= Kari Aarvold Glaser =

Norwegian pianist and music teacher (1901–1972)

Kari Marie Aarvold Glaser
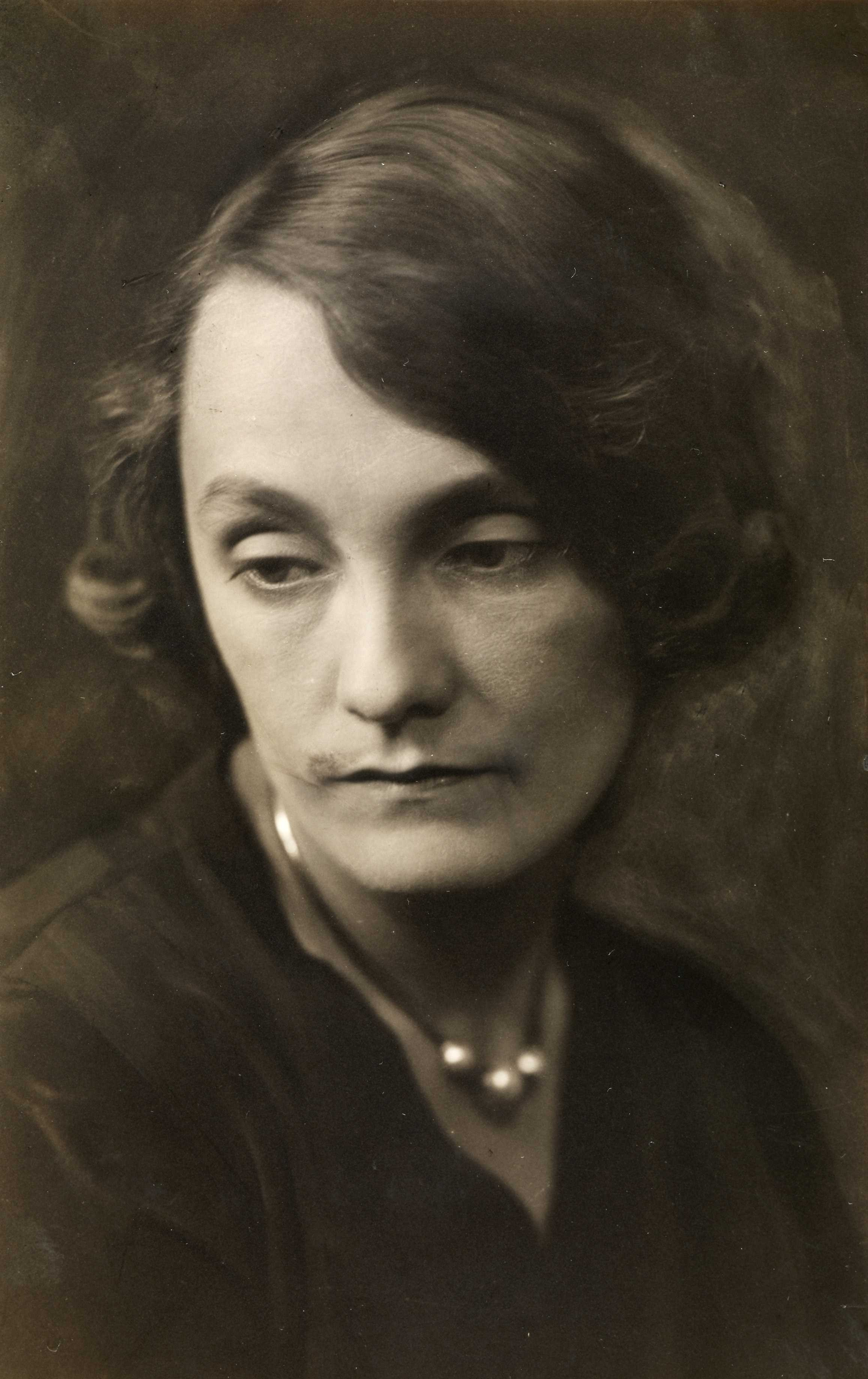
- Kari Marie Aarvold Glaser in c. 1930

Background information
- Born: 4 January 1901; Kristiania, Norway
- Origin: Norway
- Died: 3 October 1972 (aged 71); Oslo, Norway
- Genres: Classical
- Occupation(s): Musician, music teacher
- Instrument: Piano
- Spouse: Ernst Glaser (m. 1929)

Kari Marie Aarvold Glaser (4 January 1901 – 3 October 1972) was a Norwegian pianist and music teacher, who was married to the violinist Ernst Glaser, and the mother of pianist Liv Glaser.

== Early and personal life ==
Kari Marie Aarvold was born in Kristiania (now Oslo) on 4 January 1901 to Mimi Kindblad (1876–1968) and bailiff Jens Aarvold (1856–1927). She studied with Niels Larsen in Oslo, Leonid Kreutzer in Berlin from 1921 to 1923, and with P Weingarten in Vienna between 1924 and 1926. She met violinist Ernst Glaser in 1928 after he moved to Oslo to join the Oslo Philharmonic Orchestra. They later married a year later and had two daughters, including pianist Liv Glaser.

== Career ==
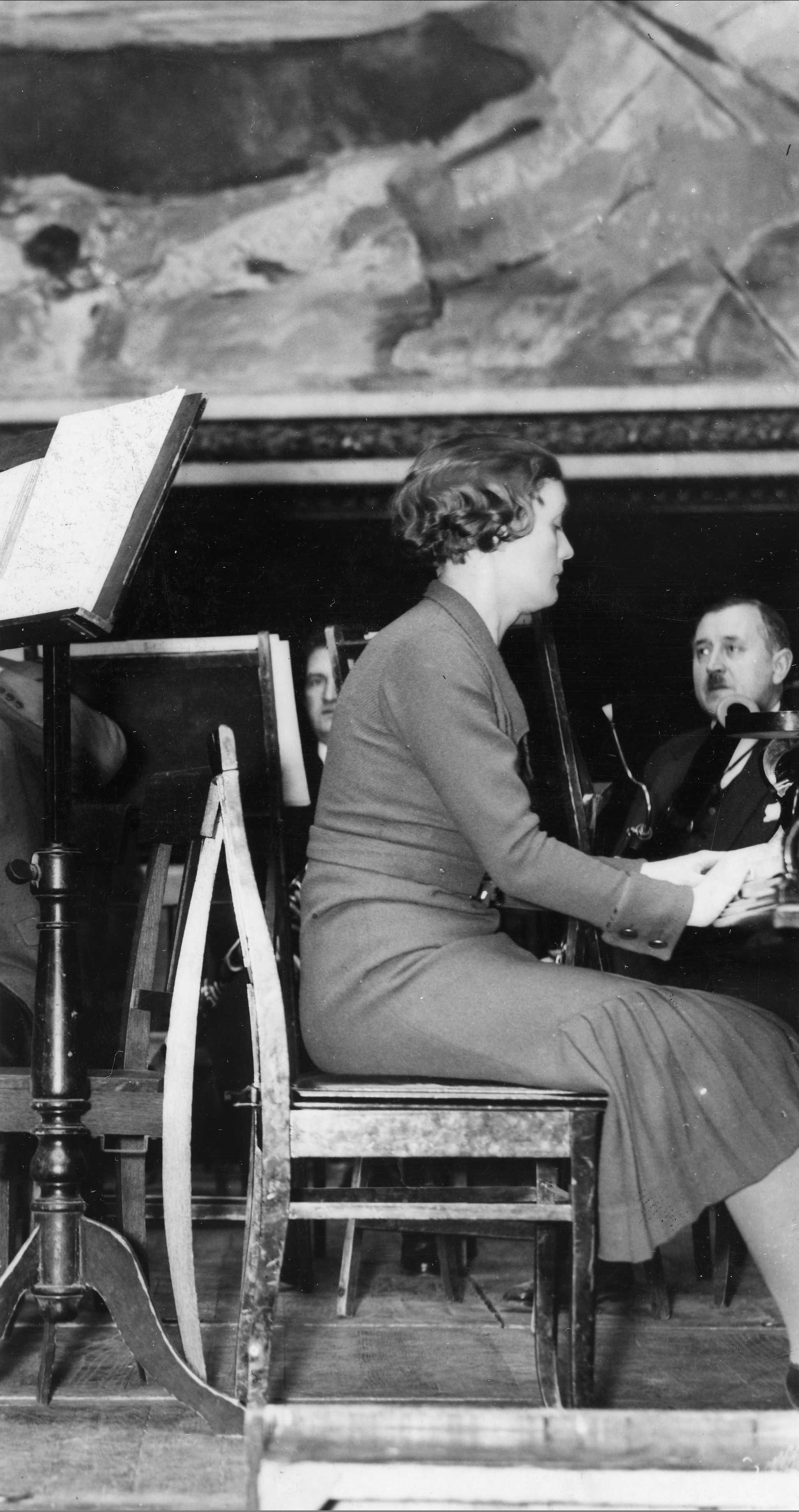
Kari Aarvold performing at the University of Oslo c. 1935

Aarvold Glaser made her concert debut in 1921 in Kristiania and became known as a performing pianist and piano teacher. The year after her debut, she performed a Liszt concerto in Berlin with the Philharmonic orchestra, conducted by Kreutzer. During her career, she held numerous concerts, both in Norway and abroad. In 1926, alongside tenor Chester Watson, she performed a concert at Chickering Hall.

After the German occupation of Norway, Aarvold Glaser's husband Ernst, who was Jewish, started to become the target of anti-Semitic attacks which led him to flee to Sweden in November 1942. Kari and her daughters then fled Norway a few days later to join him and she managed to continue with her music career whilst in Sweden.

She frequently performed with her husband and was also a soloist at the Sandefjord Orkesterforening.

== Death ==
Aarvold Glaser died on 3 October 1972 in Oslo, at the age of 71.
