= Staatstheater Darmstadt =

Theatre and opera house in Darmstadt, Germany

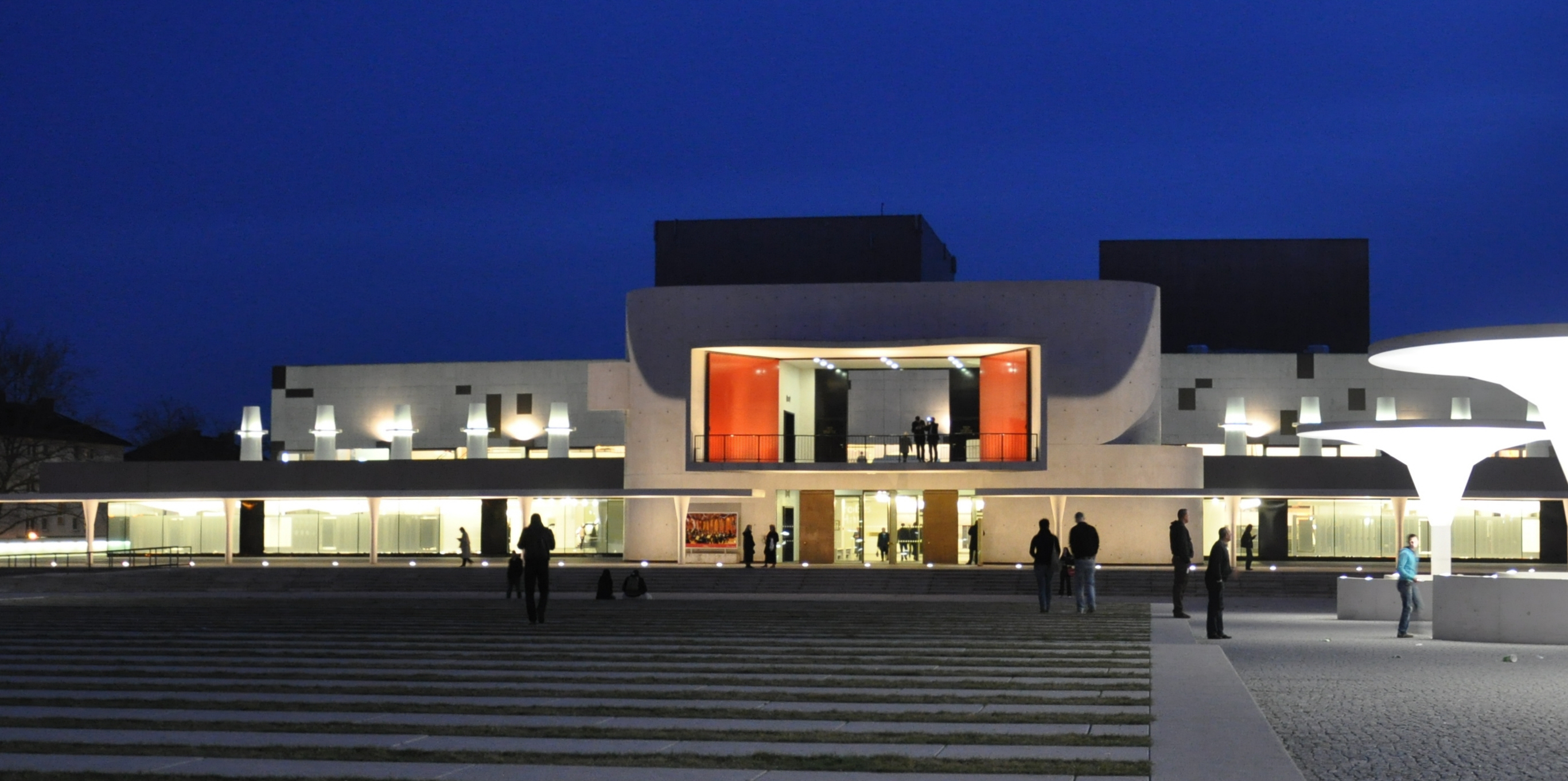
- The entrance of the theatre

General information
- Type: Theatre
- Location: Darmstadt, Hesse, Germany, Georg-Büchner-Platz 1
- Coordinates: 49°52′06″N 08°38′56″E
- Opened: 1972

Design and construction
- Architect: Rolf Prange

Other information
- Seating capacity: 956 (Großes Haus); 482 (Kleines Haus)

Website
- www.staatstheater-darmstadt.de

The Staatstheater Darmstadt (Darmstadt State Theatre) is a theatre company and building in Darmstadt, Hesse, Germany, presenting opera, ballet, plays and concerts. It is funded by the state of Hesse and the city of Darmstadt. Its history began in 1711 with a court theatre building. From 1919 it was run as Landestheater Darmstadt. The present theatre was opened in 1972 when the company was named Staatstheater.

== History ==
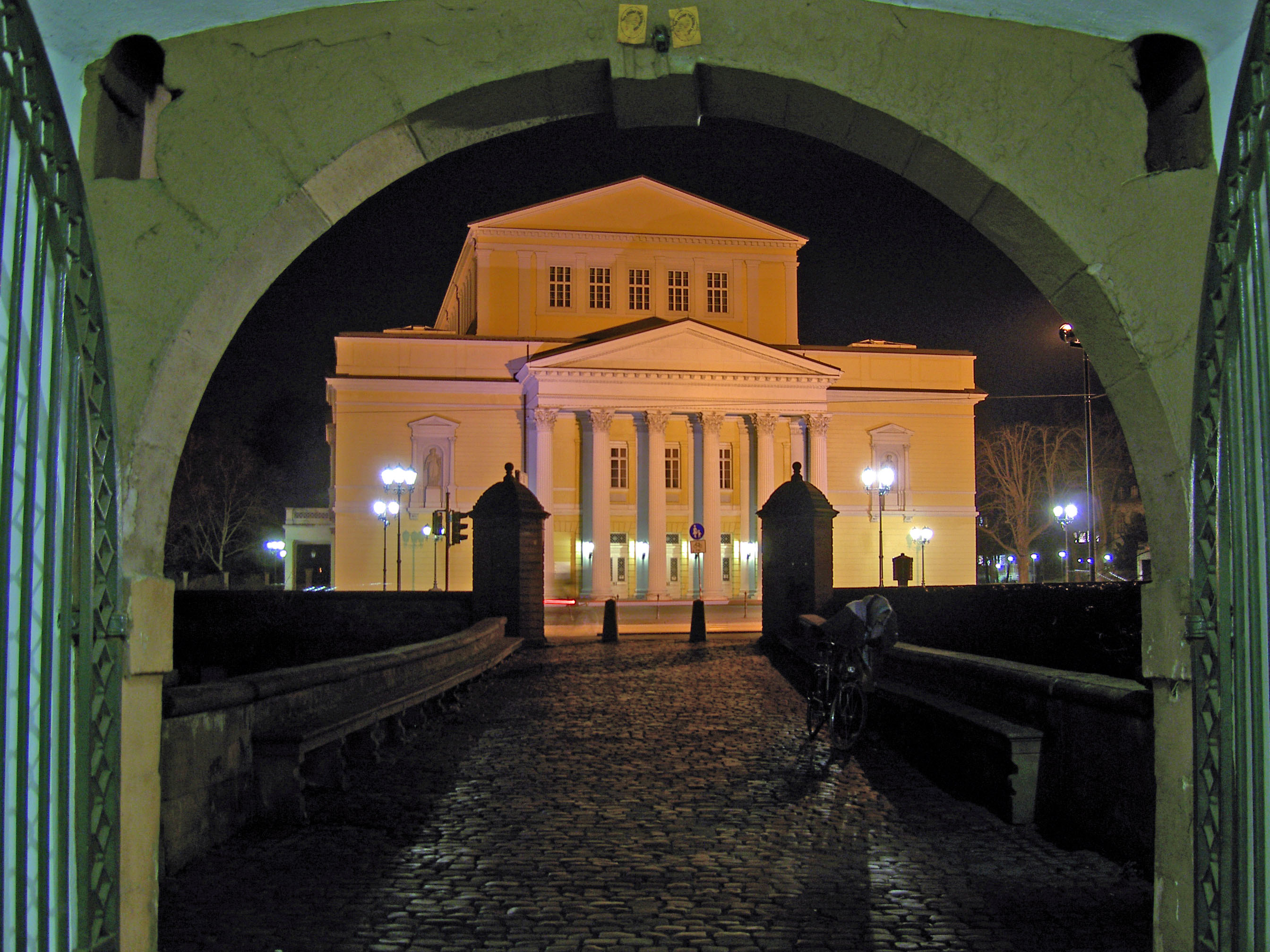
Old building at Karolinenplatz

The theatre dates back more than 300 years. It was originally a court theatre at the residence of the county Darmstadt. At a request by Elisabeth Dorothea von Hessen-Darmstadt a first theatre building in Darmstadt was opened in 1711 with Christoph Graupner's opera Telemach.

=== Großherzogliches Hoftheater Karolinenplatz ===
About a century later, Louis I, Grand Duke of Hesse, built a court theatre open to the citizens. The architect Georg Moller built a theatre with 2000 seats and advanced stage machinery, opened in 1819. It burnt down in 1871 and was restored in seven years.

=== Landestheater Karolinenplatz ===
In 1919 the theatre became a Landestheater. The former building was made the small stage (Kleines Haus). Director Gustav Hartung (1920–1924 and 1931–1933) made the theatre famous for premieres of contemporary authors. He was forced to flee by the Nazis. Actress Lilli Palmer, then 20 years old, emigrated to Paris. Both halls of the theatre were destroyed by bombs in the night 11 to 12 September 1944. After the war a provisional stage was found in the Orangerie, where the company played for almost three decades. It was known for plays during the times of directors Rudolf Sellner (1951–1961) and Gerhard F. Hering (1961–1971). The play Männersache by Franz Xaver Kroetz premiered in 1972. In 1966 Maciej Łukaszczyk arrived and worked as a Répétiteur at the Landestheater Darmstadt. In 1970 he founded the Chopin Organisation.

=== Staatstheater Georg-Büchner-Platz ===
In 1972, the theater was named Staatstheater. In his influential tenure as Intendant from 1976 to 1984, Kurt Horres directed highly regarded contemporary operas. Reinhard Febel's opera Morels Erfindung premiered on 6 November 1994. Jan Müller-Wieland's chamber opera in one act Die Nachtigall und die Rose was first performed in 1996, Die Versicherung after a play by Peter Weiss in 1999. In 2010, Orff's early opera Gisei premiered.

== Building ==
The present building was opened in 1972. The theatre is funded by the state of Hesse and the city of Darmstadt. The building was designed by the Darmstadt architect Rolf Prange who had won a national competition in 1963. The great hall (Großes Haus) seats 956 people, the small hall (Kleines Haus), mostly for plays and dance, 482. A chamber theatre (Kammerspiele) seats 120. The Großes Haus was opened on 6 October 1972 with Beethoven's Fidelio, the Kleines Haus a day later with Gaston Salvatore's Büchners Tod.

From 2002 to 2006 the building was restored, with new technical and safety features. It was reopened with Leoš Janáček's Schicksal and Lélio oder die Rückkehr ins Leben by Hector Berlioz on 22 September 2006, and a day later Schiller's Don Karlos.

== Artistic leadership ==
John Dew has been director of the theatre from 2004 till 2014. Since 2014 the Intendant is Karsten Wiegand. Music director since 2018 is Daniel Cohen, opera director is Nicola Raab.

=== Honorary members ===
- Karl Böhm, general music director (1927–1931)
- Harro Dicks, opera director (16 August 1951 – 31 October 1976)
- Hans Drewanz, general music director (16 August 1963 – 31 December 1994)
- Gerhard F. Hering, Intendant (1961–1971)
- George Maran, tenor (16 August 1956 – 30 November 1995)
- Manfred Michel, director (16 August 1970 – 31 March 1994)
- Gustav Rudolf Sellner, Intendant (1951–1961)

== Controversies ==
- 2019: Budget freeze
- 2023: Lost investment in an App.
