= Ernst Glaser =

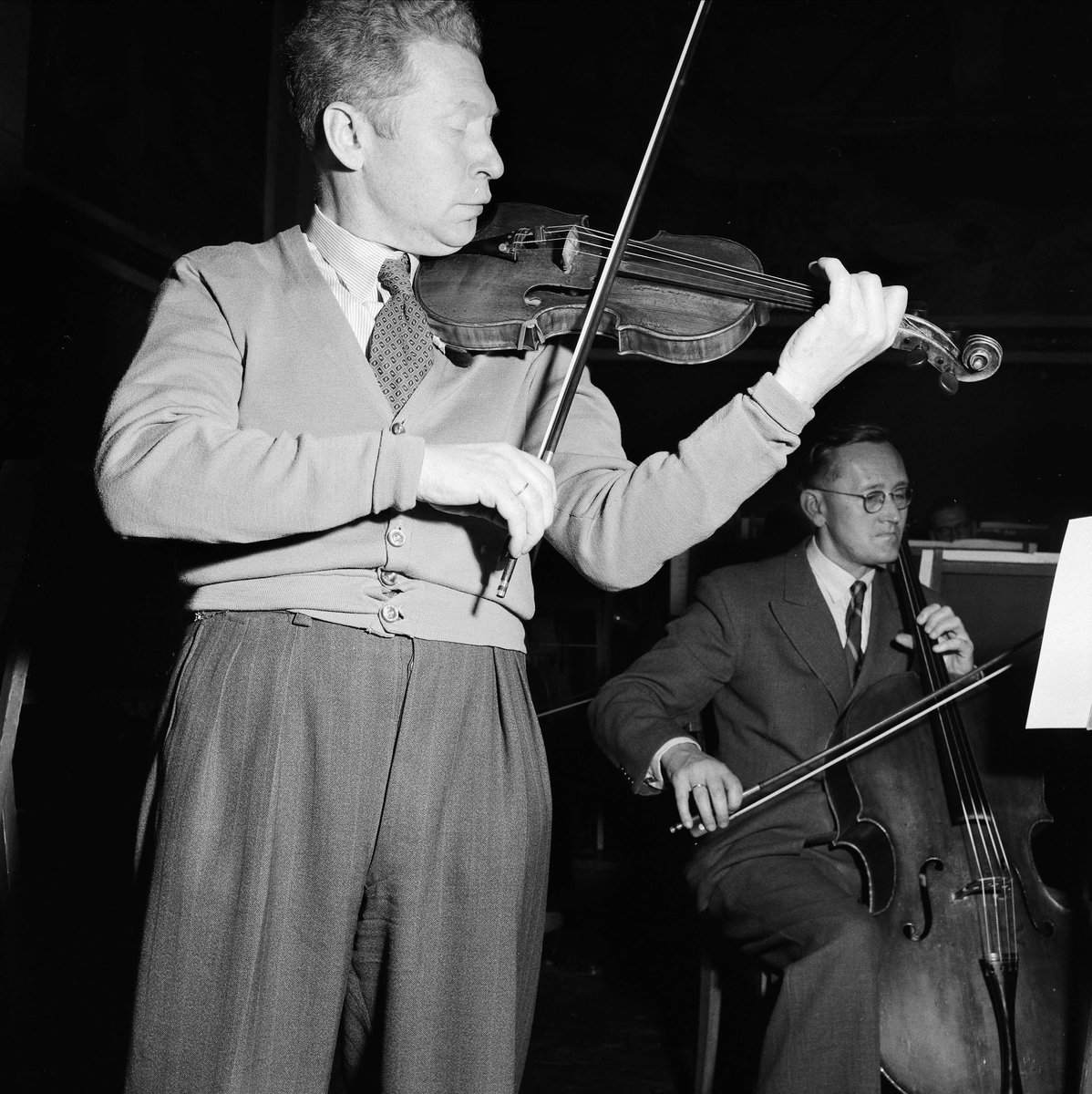
- Glaser with Karl Andersen, rehearsal 1953

Background information
- Born: 24 February 1904; Hamburg, Germany
- Died: 3 April 1979 (aged 75) Oslo
- Genre: Classical
- Occupations: Musician, music teacher
- Instrument: Violin

Ernst Glaser (24 February 1904 – 3 April 1979) was a German / Norwegian violinist, orchestra conductor and music teacher, married to the pianist Kari Aarvold Glaser. He was the father of the pianist Liv Glaser and the cellist Ernst Simon Glaser, both Norwegian classical musicians.

== Biography ==
He was born in Hamburg but moved to Norway in 1928 to take up the post as concert master of the Oslo Philharmonic after Max Rostal. The two had studied together under Carl Flesch, and when Rostal was offered a position as a professor in Berlin, he suggested Glaser as his successor.

In Oslo, Glaser worked as an orchestra musician, a soloist and a teacher. He also had solo engagements in Sweden, Denmark, Germany, the Netherlands and Israel. He introduced himself to the Norwegian audience in autumn 1928 with a recital of Sibelius' Violin Concerto, and every year after that, he was soloist in the violin concerto. He gave first performances of several violin concertos, including those of Finn Arnestad, Olav Kielland, Klaus Egge and Fartein Valen, and the rhapsody for violin and orchestra by Bjarne Brustad.

Glaser fled the Holocaust in Norway in 1942 by escaping to neutral Sweden. He returned to Norway in 1945 and stayed in the position as concert master of the Oslo Philharmonic until 1969, only interrupted by his three years in exile. Then he had taken over the principal position at the Music Conservatory in Bergen (now Griegakademiet), and worked there until 1971. He was appointed music director in Ålesund, where he besides leading music school, directed the Ålesund Symfoniorkester. His work here led to a significant resurgence of the city's musical life. Glaser burned for teaching, but was also heavily involved in the work of amateur orchestras. From 1966 until 1968 he worked as an instructor and conductor of several amateur orchestras in Sweden and Norway. He also conducted the Nord-Norsk Symfoniorkester at several concerts during the Festspillene in Harstad. From 1976 to 1977 he taught violin and chamber music at the Norwegian Academy of Music in Oslo where he died in 1979, aged 75.

Glaser performed frequently with his wife, the pianist Kari Aarvold Glaser, and together they also made recordings. Some of these have recently put Ernst Glaser in the focus again, with the publication of the first volume of a series of historic recordings, Great Norwegian Performers 1945–2000 (Simax PSC1830, 2006).

== Discography ==
As soloist

- 2006: Great Norwegian Performers 1945–2000 (Simax Records)

As music conductor

- 1969: Alf Andersen (Fontana Special), the "Concerto pour flûte et orchestra à cordes (1949)"
