= Artur Immisch =

German composer and pianist

Artur Immisch (born 24 November 1902 – 9 January 1949) was a German pianist, and composer. His musical legacy has only been gradually reconstructed since 1990.

== Life ==
Immisch was born in 1902 in Hermsdorf, then Saxe-Altenburg, as the son of a well-to-do family. In 1912, the Immischs moved to Bautzen. After graduating from high school, he moved to the University of Jena in 1921 to study Jurisprudence and National economics at his father's request. There, he began his musical education at the same time. He continued his double studies from 1922 to 1923 at the Ludwig-Maximilians-Universität München and at the Akademie der Tonkunst with Ernst Riemann. He finished it at Leipzig University during the years 1923 to 1928 where he was taught by Carl Adolf Martienssen in artistic piano playing and piano methodology and by Hermann Grabner in music theory and musical composition. In 1926, Immisch received his doctorate in law from Leipzig University. However, he never exercised legal activity; since 1928, he devoted himself exclusively to music.

His work as a concert pianist took him to several large cities in Germany, especially to Dresden, where Immisch settled in the early 1930s. He acquired a very good reputation as an intelligent interpreter of modern piano music. Later, he increasingly accompanied singers and instrumental soloists, also in broadcasting. From 1936, Immisch taught at the orchestra school of the Staatskapelle Dresden and at the Hochschule für Musik Carl Maria von Weber in Dresden. A scoliosis, which was caused by an accident during gymnastics lessons at the age of thirteen and which, according to his sister, Immisch had to "bear with difficulty throughout his life", saved him from a wartime deployment. However, Immisch was pressed to join the NSDAP, which he refused to do. This led to his dismissal without notice in 1943. As a result of the Bombing of Dresden in World War II, he gave up the city as his sphere of activity in 1945. After the end of the war, the Dresden Academy of Music and Theater renewed the offer to appoint him as lecturer at its institute. Immisch declined because of his poor state of health. He died in January 1949, shortly after reaching the age of 46, in his hometown of Bautzen.

== Work ==
Immisch left behind a qualitatively considerable compositional legacy, which is mainly based on chamber music works. Especially in the 50, mostly quite demanding, songs, in which his interest in contemporary authors is also evident, he reveals a remarkable mastery. Nearly half of these songs are settings of Chinese and Japanese lyrics. Influenced by French impressionism, these works certainly have an individual style. During his lifetime there was no longer any planned publication. After his death his work was soon forgotten for decades. From 1997 on, the sheet music of most of the songs, piano, and chamber music works was finally printed; many pieces were performed in concerts and some were documented on CD and DVD. Thanks to Immisch's last pupil at the Dresden Conservatory, Brigitta Lubke (1925-2004), the manuscripts of his works have been preserved.

== Compositions ==
- 7 songs after poems by Paul Verlaine
- Three songs after texts by Friedrich Nietzsche
- Three love poems by Ricarda Huch
- Two songs after poems by Max Dauthendey
- Ten songs from "Japanese Spring" by Hans Bethge
- 7 songs from "The Chinese Flute" by Hans Bethge
- Four Chinese songs after Li-Tai-Po, poems by Klabund
- Präludium für Klavier
- Bilder aus dem Großen Garten
- Ecce nunc benedicite Domin für zwei vierstimmige Chöre
- Poème für Klavier

== Discography ==
- 1997: Vergessene Kostbarkeiten
- 2011: Dresdner Lieder, Compositions from three centuries
- 2019: Lieder von Artur Immisch und Robert Schumann (Blu-Ray / DVD)
