= Hans Erik Deckert =

German cellist (1927–2022)

Hans Erik Deckert (11 January 1927 – 20 August 2022) was a German cellist.

== Biography ==
Hans Erik Deckert was born in Hamburg on 11 January 1927. He began his musical career at the Musisches Gymnasium Frankfurt with Kurt Thomas. After 1945, he took up studies at the Royal Danish Academy of Music in Copenhagen. Later, he studied among others with Sergiu Celibidache.

In addition to teaching at various Scandinavian conservatories from 1960 to 1989, Deckert has been active internationally as a soloist, chamber musician and conductor. He is founder and president of the Danish section of the European String Teachers Association (ESTA), initiator of the Cello Academy and member of the orchestra of the Royal Opera Copenhagen.

Deckert lived near Aarhus, Jutland. He died on 20 August 2022, at the age of 95.
