= Hans Drewanz =

German conductor (1929–2021)

- Born: 2 December 1929; Dresden, Germany
- Died: 22 June 2021 (aged 91); Darmstadt, Hesse, Germany
- Occupations: Conductor; Academic teacher
- Organisations: Staatstheater Darmstadt; Hochschule für Musik Saar
- Awards: Goethe-Plakette of Hesse; Order of Merit of the Federal Republic of Germany

Hans Drewanz (2 December 1929 – 22 June 2021) was a German conductor and academic teacher. He was the Generalmusikdirektor (GMD) of Darmstadt for more than three decades, shaping musical life in the town especially at the Staatstheater Darmstadt.

== Life ==
Hans Drewanz was born in Dresden on 2 December 1929. He grew up in Berlin with a brother named Hubertus. His father, Hanz Drewanz, was a Kapellmeister at a theatre; and his mother, Charlotte, was a kindergarten teacher. Drewanz was a pupil at the Musisches Gymnasium Frankfurt from 1940 until the end of World War II in 1945.

Drewanz worked as an organist after 1945, and from 1947 as a répétiteur at the Oper Frankfurt. Simultaneously, he studied piano at the Musikhochschule Frankfurt with August Leopolder, while all other subjects had been previously covered by the Musisches Gymnasium. Although he did not complete his studies formally, he became personal assistant to Georg Solti at the Oper Frankfurt in 1953, and also worked with Hans Rosbaud and Bruno Walter. He advanced to First Kapellmeister at the Opernhaus Wuppertal in 1959.

In 1963, Drewanz was appointed Generalmusikdirektor (GMD) at the Staatstheater Darmstadt, then the youngest GMD in Germany He shaped the musical theatre and concerts for more than three decades until 1994, then became its honorary member. He continued the tradition of music in Darmstadt, based on the work of Karl Böhm and Gustav Rudolf Sellner, and of the Darmstädter Ferienkurse. During his tenure, he conducted operas such as Henze's Der Prinz von Homburg, Schoeck's Penthesilea, Rimsky-Korsakov's Der goldene Hahn, Stravinsky's The Rake's Progress, Britten's Tod in Venedig, and the operas by Wolfgang Fortner. In concerts, he performed the complete works by Gustav Mahler when the composer was not yet popular, and covered 400 years of music history from Monteverdi's Vespro della Beata Vergine and Charpentier's Magnificat to Stravinsky's Symphony of Psalms and Hans Ulrich Engelmann's Stele für Georg Büchner.

Drewanz was interim GMD at the Oper Frankfurt from 1981 to 1983. He taught as professor of conducting at the Hochschule für Musik Saar from 1984. From 1997 to 2009, he was the first guest conductor and musical advisor at the Bern Theatre.

Drewanz died in Darmstadt at age 91.

== Awards ==
- 1980: Johann-Heinrich-Merck-Ehrung.
- 1994: Verdienstplakette der Stadt Darmstadt, Goethe-Plakette of Hesse.
- 2014: Darmstädter Musikpreis.
- 2016: Order of Merit of the Federal Republic of Germany.
