= Klaus Storck =

German classical cellist

- Born: 28 February 1928; Berlin, Germany
- Died: 18 March 2011 (aged 83); Katowice, Poland
- Education: Musisches Gymnasium Frankfurt; Hochschule für Musik Detmold
- Occupations: Cellist; Academic teacher; Music editor
- Organisations: Klaviertrio Alfons Kontarsky; Musikhochschule Hannover; Musikhochschule München; Musikhochschule Köln; Musikhochschule Weimar
- Spouse: Helga Storck

Klaus Storck (11 February 1928 – 18 March 2011) was a German cellist who appeared internationally as soloist and chamber musician. He also edited music for cello. He often appeared in a duo with his wife, the harpist Helga Storck, and composers wrote music for them.

== Life ==
Storck was born in Berlin. He received his first cello lessons at the age of eight. After transferring to the Musisches Gymnasium Frankfurt, he studied there with Rudolf Metzmacher. From autumn 1946, Storck studied at the Hochschule für Musik Detmold with Hans Münch-Holland. He spent several years studying with Enrico Mainardi, on a scholarship of the Studienstiftung des deutschen Volkes.

Storck toured many countries as a soloist and chamber musician. He built an extensive classical and romantic repertoire He included pieces by lesser-known composers and works of contemporary music in his programs, such as Britten, Martin, Shostakovich, Genzmer, Bialas, Kagel, Baird and Medek, often in world premieres. His programs have been broadcast on radio and television, and he played extensively for recordings. Storck's first recording of Schubert's Arpeggione Sonata on original instruments, with Alfons Kontarsky playing hammerflügel, received special international attention. His chamber music activities have included duos with his wife, the harpist Helga Storck. inspiring composers such as Harald Genzmer to write music for them. He played with pianist Aya Ishihara, and formed the Klaviertrio Alfons Kontarsky, a piano trio with Alfons Kontarsky and violinist Saschko Gawriloff.

Storck also worked as an editor of compositions for cello, and wrote an arrangement of the Arpeggione Sonata for cello and piano, published by Bärenreiter.

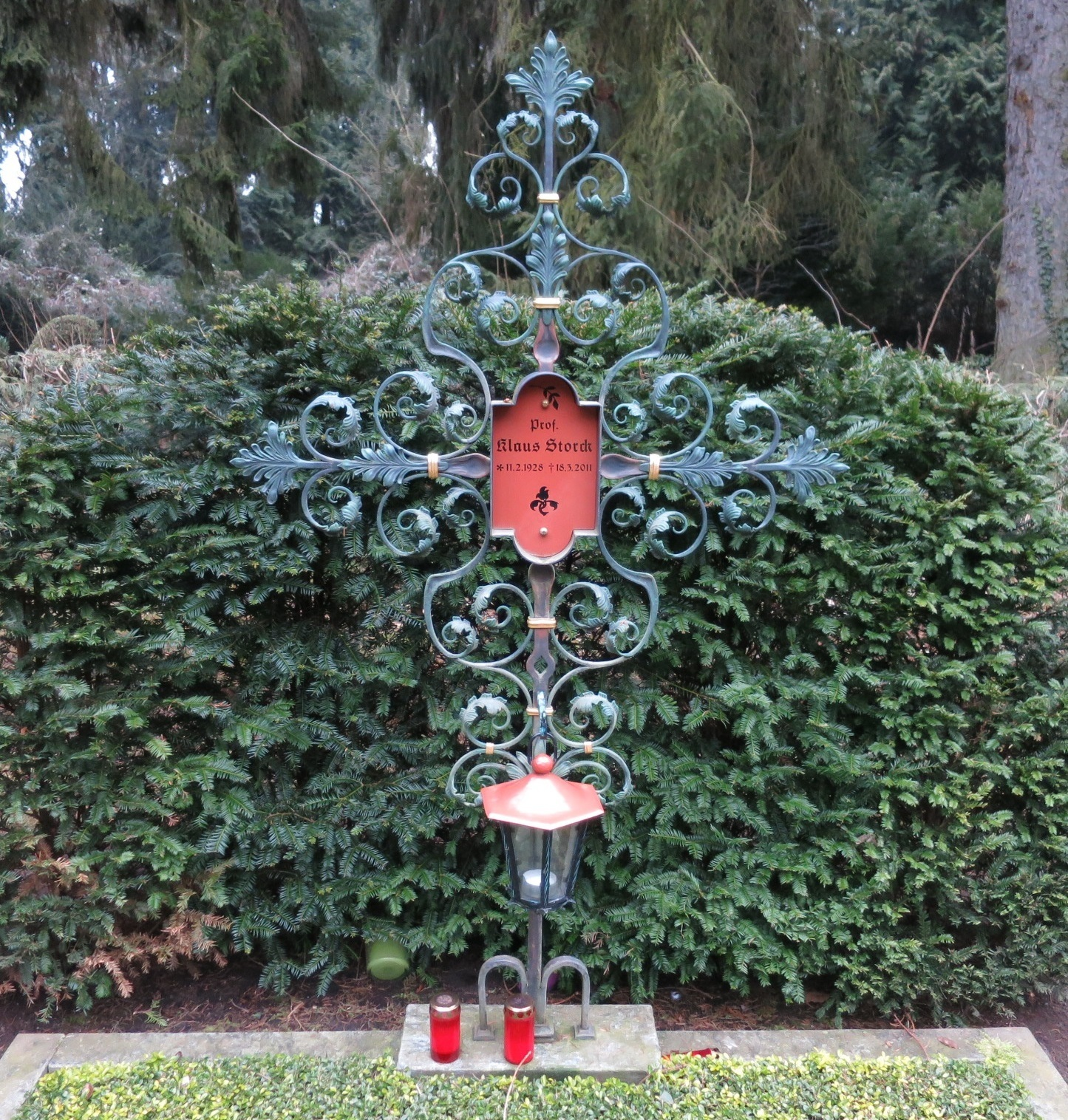
Grave at the Cologne South Cemetery

Storck was a professor at the Musikhochschule Hannover and the Musikhochschule München, as well as the head of a university class for cello at the Musikhochschule Köln from 1964 to 1971. From 1992 to 2003, he also taught a class of chamber music with harp at the Musikhochschule Weimar. He taught master classes all over the world, such as in summer 2007 in Sankt Paul im Lavanttal, and in April 2009 at the Musikhochschule Hannover and the Landesmusikakademie Sondershausen. One of his sons is the surgeon and violist Martin Storck.

Storck died in Katowice at the age of 83. His grave is located at the Cologne South Cemetery (Flur 43).

== Recordings ==
- Vivaldi: Concerto in C minor, RV 434 (with Kammerorchester Emil Seiler, conducted by W. Hofmann), Archiv-Produktion 198 318 (1962) OCLC 243495207
- C. Ph. E. Bach: Concerto in A minor, Wq 170 (with the Berliner Kammermusikkreis, conducted by M. Lange), Deutsche Grammophon 135 033 (1963) OCLC 990244633
- Brahms: Trio für Klavier, Klarinette und Cello, Op. 114 (with pianist Detlef Kraus and clarinetist Jost Michaels) Musicaphon 30 L 1522 (1963) OCLC 1183600220
- Kagel: Match für 3 Spieler (with Siegfried Palm and Christoph Caskel), Deutsche Grammophon 137 006 (1968) OCLC 27332263
- Schubert: Arpeggione Sonata (with Alfons Kontarsky, Hammerflügel), Archiv-Produktion 2533 175 (1974) OCLC 312737276
- Monteverdi: Vespro della Beata Vergine, Regensburg Cathedral Choir, Hanns Martin Schneidt, DG (1975)
- Dvořák and Janáček, Complete Works for Cello and Piano (with Karl Engel), Telefunken 6.42038 (1977) OCLC 725592099
- Tadeusz Baird: Szenen für Cello, Harfe und Orchester (with Helga Storck), Polska Nagranie MUZA SX 1615 (1980) OCLC 785998390
- Virtuose Gesellschaftsmusik für Harfe und Violoncello ca. 1800 (with Helga Storck), Telefunken SLT 43 109-B (1993) OCLC 1133660459
- Beethoven und seine Zeit, Werke für Violoncello und Harfe (with Helga Storck), Colosseum COL 9503 (1986) OCLC 36991669
- Kleine Werke der Romantik (with pianist Yasuko Matsuda), Colosseum COL 9504 (1988) OCLC 29715702
- Louis Spohr: Kammermusik mit Harfe (with Helga Storck and violinist Kurt Guntner), Calig 30837 (1989) OCLC 22869499
- Robert Schumann: Complete Works for Violoncello and Piano (with Aya Ishihara, 2010) OCLC 1184356540
