= Erik Then-Bergh =

German pianist and music educator (1916–1982)

Erik Then-Bergh (3 May 1916 – 19 April 1982) was a German pianist and music educator.

== Life and career ==
Born in Hanover, Then-Bergh received his first piano lessons at the age of five from his father and further training with the Hanoverian piano teacher Clara Spitta (1885-1955). He made his first public appearance in his home town at the age of 13. Later he studied piano in Frankfurt in the master class of Alfred Hoehn and then deepened his studies with Carl Adolf Martienssen in Berlin. At the age of 20 he won the Walter Bachmann Prize in Dresden. He made his debut in 1938 at the Deutsche Oper Berlin with piano concertos by Beethoven and Brahms. The high point of his career was during the Second World War, where he played under famous conductors and won the National Music Prize in 1940 as the best young pianist.

After the war, extensive concert tours took him all over Europe, where he played under famous conductors like Herbert von Karajan or Joseph Keilberth. In 1954 he played four concerts in Hamburg and Berlin under the conductor Wilhelm Furtwängler. Furtwängler was so impressed by him that he asked him to perform the revised version of his Symphonic Concerto in B minor on a major concert tour with the Berliner Philharmonikern. Both rehearsed and worked on the work together, but Furtwängler's death on 30 Nov. 1954 caused the tour to fail. Then-Bergh played this concert almost 4 years later, on 25 January 1958 in the concert hall of the Universität der Künste Berlin with the Berlin Philharmonic Orchestra in a homage to Furtwängler. The conductor was Artur Rother.

Then-Bergh was not only a pianist, but also a committed music educator. Since 1949 he taught at the Folkwang University of the Arts, from 1952 at the same time and later entirely at the Musikhochschule München, where he taught until his death. His recording concentrating mainly on the works of Beethoven, Mozart and Max Reger. In 1955 he sat on the jury of the International Chopin Piano Competition in Warsaw, as did his teacher Alfred Hoehn in 1932 and 1937.

Then-Bergh died in Baldham near Munich at age 65.
