= Liv Glaser =

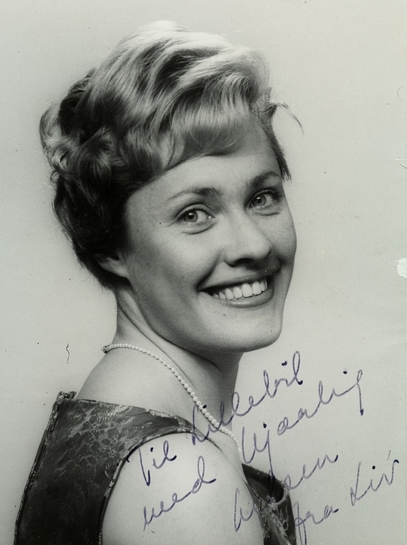
- Glaser ca. 1965

Background information
- Born: 23 September 1935 (age 90); Oslo, Norway
- Origin: Norway
- Genres: Classical
- Occupations: Musician, music teacher
- Instrument: Piano
- Website: nmh.no/en/about_nmh/staff/liv-glaser
- Parents: Ernst Glaser; Kari Aarvold Glaser
- Relatives: Ernst Simon Glaser (half-brother)

Liv Glaser (born 23 September 1935) is a Norwegian pianist, music teacher, and professor at the Norwegian Academy of Music. She was born in Oslo, the daughter of violinist Ernst Glaser and pianist Kari Aarvold Glaser. In 1971 she married director of culture Carsten Edvard Munch (1927–2005).

== Biography ==
Glaser was raised in a family where both parents were professional musicians. From 1952 to 1956 she studied with classical pianist Robert Riefling, and later with Vlado Perlemuter in Paris. Her debut concert was in Oslo in 1960. She has lectured at the Norwegian Academy of Music from 1973, where she was appointed professor in 1994. Her paternal half-brother is cellist Ernst Simon Glaser.

Glaser has cooperated with the conductor Sir John Barbirolli. Having been a soloist in Prokofiev's third piano concerto, in Oslo under his taktstock, he invited her to Hallé Orchestra in Manchester 1962, with the same concert, and in 1963 she played Grieg's A minor concert with him and Hallé Orchestra on tour.

Glaser's repertoire ranges widely. She has played a lot of French music that she became close to during their studies in Paris. The classical repertoire might have been her closest, but she has also performed much Norwegian music, especially chamber music Grieg and compositions for piano solo, and has for many years been a regular performer at the Festspillene i Bergen (Bergen International Festival). She has collaborated with Arve Tellefsen for several years.

She was appointed Commander of the Royal Norwegian Order of St. Olav in 2018.

== Honors ==
- 1988: Gammleng-prisen in the category Classic
- 2004: Lindeman-prisen

== Discography ==
Edvard Grieg

- 1965: Lyric Pieces Vol. I (RCA Victor Red Seal)
- 1965: Lyric Pieces Vol. II (RCA Victor Red Seal)
- 1965: Lyric Pieces Vol. III (RCA Victor Red Seal)
- 1965: Lyric Pieces Vol. IV Concluded (RCA Victrola)
- 2007: Lyrical Travels With Edvard Grieg (Simax Classics)

Klaus Egge

- 1971: Sonata for violin and piano op. 3 (Philips Classics), feat. Arve Tellefsen

Agathe Backer Grøndahl

- 1975: Romanser (Norsk Kulturråds Klassikerserie), feat. Kari Frisell
- 1975: Klaverstykker (Norsk Kulturråds Klassikerserie)
- 1988: Piano Pieces And Songs (Norsk Kulturråds Klassikerserie), compilation feat. Kari Frisell

Wolfgang Amadeus Mozart

- 1991: Mozart Piano Sonatas, No. 1, 2, 3, 4 and 5 (Simax Classics)
- 1993: Mozart Piano Sonatas, No. 6, 11 and 14 (Simax Classics)
- 1995: Mozart Piano Sonatas, No. 7, 8, 9 and 10 (Simax Classics)
- 1999: Mozart Piano Sonatas, No. 12, 13 and 17 (Simax Classics)
- 2000: Mozart Piano Sonatas, No. 15, 16 and 18 (Simax Classics)

Franz Schubert

- 1997: Schubert, Die Schöne Müllerin (Simax Classics), feat. Per Vollestad

Dedicated Ernst Glaser's 100 years anniversary

- 2004: Schubert & Schumann (Simax Classics), feat. Ernst Simon Glaser

Other

- 2006: Muzio Clementi For All Ages (Simax Classics), recited on a Longman & Clementi 1799
- 2014: Liebestreu (LAWO), feat. Helene Wold
