= August Leopolder =

German pianist and music educator

August Leopolder (6 July 1905 – 31 August 2006) was a German pianist and piano pedagogue.

== Life ==
Born in Munich, Leopolder was a student of Carl Adolf Martienssen and Egon Petri. During the Second World War, he first taught in Aschaffenburg, then from March 1941 on at the Musisches Gymnasium Frankfurt under the direction of Kurt Thomas. From 1950, he was professor at the Frankfurt University of Music and Performing Arts, where he also served as senate member and dean of the (then) department of artistic education.

On the occasion of his 100th birthday he was awarded the dignity of Honorary Senator of the Hochschule für Musik und Darstellende Kunst Frankfurt.

In a press release of the University of Music and Performing Arts Frankfurt am Main he is described as "a real Bavarian personality with a rough skin and some rough edges but with a soft core".

Leopolder died in Frankfurt aged 101.

== Honours ==
- 1986: Order of Merit of the Federal Republic of Germany

== Literature ==
- Norbert Beneke, Karin di Felice: Wer ist wer? 46th edition 2007/2008: Das Deutsche WHO'S WHO, 2007, p. 805
- List of compositions on worldCat.
