= Ernst Simon Glaser =

- Born: 1975 (age 50–51); Ålesund, Sunnmøre, Norway
- Genres: Classical
- Occupations: Musician, music teacher
- Instrument: Cello
- Website: www.ernstsimonglaser.com

Ernst Simon Glaser (born 1975) is a Norwegian musician (cello) and music teacher, the son of violinist Ernst Glaser (1904–79), and brother of the pianist Liv Glaser (1935–).

== Biography ==
Glaser was born in Ålesund, Norway, and moved to England at the age of six. He obtained his degree in music from the Royal Northern College of Music in Manchester. In 2002 he was awarded This Year's Young Soloist by Concerts Norway, and had his debut concert at the University Concert Hall in Oslo in 2003. Glaser received the Debutantprisen in 2004, and was appointed as alternate solo cellist in the Trondheim Symphony Orchestra and the Norwegian National Opera and Ballet for ten years. He is currently principal cellist at the Gothenburg Symphony Orchestra. In 2014 he began teaching at the Norwegian Academy of Music, together with cellist Truls Mørk. Glaser has toured extensively in Europe and Asia, and performed Olav Anton Thommessen among others, at Siljustøl during Bergen International Festival in 2015.

== Discography ==
- 2004: Schubert & Schumann (Simax Classics)
- 2012: Zvezdochka in Orbit (Aurora Records)
