= Hans Bethge (poet) =

German poet

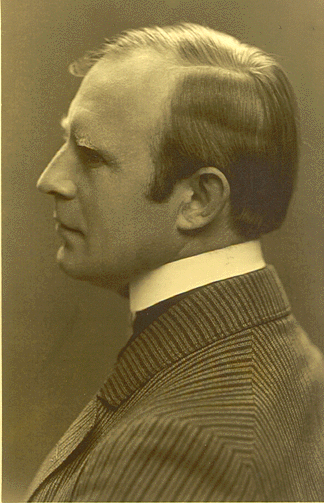
Hans Bethge (1913).png

Hans Bethge (9 January 1876 – 1 February 1946) was a German poet whose reputation abroad rests above all on his free adaptations of Tang dynasty poetry set in Gustav Mahler's symphonic song cycle Das Lied von der Erde. The Max Eyth House in Kirchheim unter Teck houses a permanent exhibit of Hans Bethge's books, photographs and other artifacts, while his manuscripts are preserved at the Deutsches Literaturarchiv Marbach.

== Life ==
Hans Bethge was born in 1876 in Dessau. He studied modern languages and philosophy at the universities of Halle, Erlangen and Geneva. After graduation, he spent two years as a teacher in Spain. In 1901, he set himself up as a freelance writer in Berlin. In 1943, at the height of the air campaign, he moved to the Swabian countryside where he spent his last years.

Hans Bethge treasured friendships as well as all that was beautiful; many writers and artists were his friends, including the poet Prince Emil von Schoenaich-Carolath, the painters Willi Geiger and Karl Hofer, and the art historian Julius Meier-Gräfe, as well as other artists from the Worpswede artist colony. The Jugendstil painter Heinrich Vogeler illustrated three of his books, and the sculptor Wilhelm Lehmbruck, whose genius Bethge had recognized early on, made several portraits of him.

He died in Göppingen in 1946, aged 70; he was buried in Kirchheim unter Teck.

== Artistic achievement ==
Bethge published several volumes of poems (chiefly on love and nature), diaries, travelogues, short stories, essays and plays. He had great success as an editor of modern poetry, German and foreign. But above all, his poetic translations of oriental classics (starting in 1907) gained him wide recognition, in spite of their reliance on previous translators. The first such book, "The Chinese Flute", had a printing of 100,000 copies. Gustav Mahler used six of its poems in Das Lied von der Erde. The fresh, musical rhythm of Bethge's language and his free versification inspired settings by more than 180 other composers, among them Richard Strauss, Karol Szymanowski, Arnold Schoenberg, Anton Webern, Hanns Eisler, Anna Teichmüller, Viktor Ullmann, Gottfried von Einem, Ernst Krenek, Artur Immisch, Ludvig Irgens-Jensen, Paul Graener, Bohuslav Martinů, Ernst Toch, Fartein Valen, Krzysztof Penderecki and Egon Wellesz.

== Works ==
- Die stillen Inseln
- Der gelbe Kater
- Deutsche Lyrik seit Liliencron (Anthologie)
- Die Lyrik des Auslandes in neuerer Zeit (Anthologie)
- Lieder des Orients (Nachdichtungen)
- Die chinesische Flöte. Nachdichtungen chinesischer Lyrik. ISBN 3-9806799-5-0
- Pfirsichblüten aus China. Nachdichtungen chinesischer Lyrik. ISBN 3-935727-06-2
- Ägyptische Reise (Egyptian Journey)
- Die armenische Nachtigall. Nachdichtungen des Nahabet Kuchak und anderer armenischer Dichter. ISBN 3-935727-02-X
- Das türkische Liederbuch. Nachdichtungen türkischer Lyrik. ISBN 3-9806799-7-7
- Japanischer Frühling. Nachdichtungen japanischer Lyrik. ISBN 3-935727-00-3
- Hafez - Die Lieder und Gesänge in Nachdichtungen. ISBN 3-935727-03-8
- Omar Khayyam - Die Nachdichtungen seiner Rubai'yat. ISBN 3-935727-01-1
- Sadi der Weise. Die Verse des persischen Dichters in Nachdichtungen. ISBN 3-9806799-6-9
- Der persische Rosengarten. Nachdichtungen persischer Lyrik. ISBN 3-935727-01-1
- Die indische Harfe. Nachdichtungen indischer Lyrik. Nachdichtungen orientalischer Lyrik. ISBN 3-9806799-8-5
- Arabische Nächte. Nachdichtungen arabischer Lyrik. ISBN 3-935727-05-4
- Der asiatische Liebestempel. Nachdichtungen der Liebeslieder der Völker Mittelasiens. ISBN 3-935727-04-6
- Die Courtisane Jamaica (Novellen) (Karlsruhe, Dreililien-Verlag, 1911, 1. Ausgabe 157 S., Deckelillustration v. Karl Walser, 1000 Ex.) (Davon auch eine Vorzugsausgabe in Ganzpergament mit Kopfgoldschnitt in Kassette mit farbigen montierten Deckelillustrationen v. Karl Walser, nummeriert 15 Ex. auf van Geldern Bütten) (erschien Berlin, Gyldendalscher Verlag, 1922. 2. - 4. Tausend, bei Morawe & Scheffelt und Universitas Deutsche Verlags AG Berlin

== Sources ==
- Eberhard Gilbert Bethge: Hans Bethge. Leben und Werk. Eine Biographie. 3., erw. u. bebild. Auflage. YinYang Media, Kelkheim 2002, ISBN 3-9806799-9-3
- Bernd Löffler: Hans Bethge in Kirchheim unter Teck. In Marbacher Spuren. Issue 12, Marbach 1991
