= Musisches Gymnasium Frankfurt =

Former German music school (1939–1945)

Coordinates: 50°5′32″N 8°39′4″E

The Musisches Gymnasium Frankfurt was an educational institution leading to a university entrance qualification within the framework of the National Socialist Education System. It was founded in 1939 as the first Musisches Gymnasium of the then Greater German Reich at Adolf Hitler's request and closed after the end of the Second World War in 1945. The school was under the direct supervision of the Reich Ministry of Science, Education and Culture, and the city of Frankfurt was the school authority. It became known under its director Kurt Thomas. In its internal constitution, the Musisches Gymnasium retained a special position within the National Socialist elite schools, for example through the performance of otherwise suppressed church musical works or the inclusion of confessional religious instruction in the timetable.

== Plans and aims ==
As early as 1921, Leo Kestenberg, a pianist, music teacher and cultural politician of Jewish descent, had developed the plan for a music college. It was to have six grades, i.e. cover only the 8th to 13th school year, and be established for an initial transitional period as a branch of a normal secondary school. Kestenberg was not thinking of creating a separate type of school with a boarding school. However, the implementation of his plans was not yet possible at the time, because Kestenberg was only active in a leading position, as a ministerial councillor, in the Prussian Ministry of Spiritual, Educational and Medical Affairs from 1929. He did implement the first fundamental reform of the German school music system, but shortly afterwards, in January 1933, the National Socialists came to power and put an abrupt end to his work. Kestenberg left Germany and went into emigration.

Another idea developed after the Nazi seizure of power, the SS-Sturmbannführer Martin Miederer, who in 1937 was appointed senior government councillor and head of the music department in the Reich Ministry of Science, Education and Culture (REM). Miederer succeeded in winning Hitler over to his idea of establishing a Musisches Gymnasium. According to Miederer's ideas, the Musisches Gymnasium should give music priority over other artistic subjects, because music requires extensive training and, above all, training that begins at an early age. The basis of musical instruction was to be communal music-making in choir and orchestra, accompanied by intensive individual training. This corresponded to the Nazi maxim of a comprehensive education of body, soul and spirit. The training of musically gifted students was planned. Perhaps it was also intended to counter the preponderance of Party special schools, because while the Nationalpolitische Erziehungsanstalt emphasised physical education, the Adolf Hitler Schools emphasised political education and the normal secondary schools emphasised academic education, the Musisches Gymnasium was intended to be a type of school that emphasised musical education. In order to be able to find and attract young talents, boys from Volksschulklassen 3 and 4, i.e. as young as eight, were to be admitted to the Musisches Gymnasium. Those who did not fulfil the expectations placed in them could and had to leave this musical training school again.

The aim of this education was the school-leaving examination, which entitled the student to study at any level. All pupils were grouped together in a boarding school. The structure and capacity of this boarding school was ten classes with a total of 300 pupils. Girls were not admitted, nor were day pupils. The headmaster, who was to be a distinguished musician, was assisted by a Oberstudiendirektor as "head of teaching".

== Musisches Gymnasium in Frankfurt ==
The first Musisches Gymnasium was founded in 1939, with the City of Frankfurt taking over its sponsorship. The Musisches Gymnasium Frankfurt started school on 1 September 1939. The school was located in Haus Buchenrode in the Niederrad district, the former villa of the Frankfurt industrialist and honorary citizen Arthur von Weinberg. In November 1938, he had been forced to sell the property to the city for a fraction of its value and, in addition, to use the proceeds of the sale to partially cover the property levies incumbent on the basis of the Ordinance on an atonement of the Jews of 12 November 1938 to the municipal treasury. According to witness reports, the then mayor Friedrich Krebs and other National Socialist functionaries forcibly gained entry and sent the almost eighty-year-old owner into the park with the sentence "The Jew has to go" in preparation for the forced sale of his house. Weinberg was sent to Theresienstadt concentration camp on 2 June 1942. Deportation of Jews from Germany, where he died on 20 March 1943.

The Reich Ministry of Education in Berlin was responsible for the supervision of the school. The overall management of the school was entrusted to the experienced music educator, choir director and composer Kurt Thomas, who, however, had not been involved in the conception or preparation of the school's operation. Thomas thus had to take over a ready-structured institution.

The Musisches Gymnasium began operations on 6 November 1939 with 115 pupils, who came from all parts of the then German Reich and all lived in the boarding school. Girls and day pupils were not admitted. As the premises of Buchenrode House were too small, the Gymnasium took over other neighbouring properties at the end of 1939, including the aryanized residential building Niederräder Landstraße 26.

The Buchenrode house was heavily damaged by aerial bombs during a severe air raid on 20 December 1943. Another air raid on 29 January 1944 destroyed the building and the neighbouring buildings to such an extent that the school had to be closed down. The pupils of the lower grammar school classes were then sent home to their families, while classes 3 to 7 who were imprisoned from 11 April 1944 to 26 May 1944 in the Wehrertüchtigungslager Reichelsheim in the Odenwald received lessons.

From May 1944 until the end of the war, the school was relocated to the Kloster Untermarchtal of the Barmherzige Schwestern vom hl. Vinzenz von Paul in Untermarchtal. The school was finally closed on 25 May 1945.

== Notable students ==
- Hans Clarin
- Hans Erik Deckert
- Hans Drewanz
- Paul Walter Fürst
- Clytus Gottwald
- Heinz Hennig
- Alfred Koerppen
- Helmut Kretschmar
- Paul Kuhn
- Günter Ludwig
- Otto-Werner Mueller
- Otto Nitze
- Wolfgang Pasquay
- Ferry Radax
- Hans-Joachim Rotzsch
- Johannes Schäfer
- Wolfgang Schoor
- Horst Stein
- Klaus Storck
- Siegfried Strohbach
- Wolfgang Trommer
- Rüdiger Volhard

== Other music schools ==
In 1941, a Musisches Gymnasium Leipzig was opened. This existed alongside the Thomasschule zu Leipzig and was run by the Thomaskantor Günther Ramin. From 1942 onwards, there was another Musisches Gymnasium, outside the German state borders but based on the German model, at the Budapest National Conservator. A total of six Musisches Gymnasien were planned in Germany. The events of the war and finally, in 1945, the total collapse of the German Reich put an end to these plans.

== Source ==
- Institut für Stadtgeschichte (Frankfurt am Main): Council papers 6500, 3420/2, 6512/9,1 and 5420/19, 1,2
