= Gerhart Darmstadt =

German cellist

Gerhart Darmstadt (born 1952) is a German cellist, arpeggione player, conductor, specialist in historical performance practice and academic teacher.

== Life ==
Born in Halle (Saale), Darmstadt studied violoncello at the Folkwang University of the Arts with Mirko Dorner and historical performance practice with Nikolaus Harnoncourt at the Mozarteum University Salzburg. He supplemented his training with several courses with Anner Bylsma.

Darmstadt is professor of baroque violoncello, historical performance practice and chamber music at the Hochschule für Musik und Theater Hamburg. Since 2006, he has been president of the International Joseph Martin Kraus Society.

In 2014, Darmstadt and Isolde Zerer-Kittel were awarded the Hamburg Teaching Prize for the study project Christmas Oratorio by J.S. Bach. The 10,000 euros award is presented by the Government of Hamburg and is based on suggestions from students.

His older brother is the church music director, academic teacher and composer Hans Darmstadt.
