= Kurt Thomas (composer) =

German composer

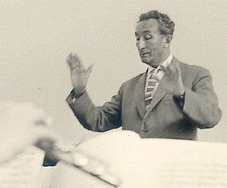
- The composer conducting
- Born: Kurt Georg Hugo Thomas; 25 May 1904; Tönning, German Empire
- Died: 31 March 1973 (aged 68); Bad Oeynhausen, West Germany
- Education: Leipzig University
- Occupations: Conductor; Academic; Composer
- Organizations: Landeskonservatorium der Musik zu Leipzig; Akademische Hochschule für Musik; Dreikönigskirche; Thomanerchor; Frankfurter Kantorei; Musikhochschule Lübeck

Olympic medal record

Art competitions
Silver medal – second place	1936 Berlin	Solo and chorus

Kurt Georg Hugo Thomas (25 May 1904 – 31 March 1973) was a German composer, conductor and music educator.

== Life ==
Thomas was born in Tönning. The family lived from 1910 in Lennep where he attended the Röntgen-Gymnasium from 1913 to 1922. Completing with the Abitur on 21 April 1922, he studied law and music at the Leipzig University. He completed his studies in 1925 and worked as a lecturer of music theory at the Landeskonservatorium der Musik zu Leipzig. He composed a Mass in A minor as his Op. 1, which earned him the Beethoven Prize of the Preußische Akademie der Künste in 1927. Initiated by Karl Straube, he was appointed a teacher of composition and leader of the Kantorei (chorale) of the Kirchenmusikalisches Institut Leipzig (Institute of church music). The choir was named "Kurt-Thomas-Kantorei" and toured in Germany.

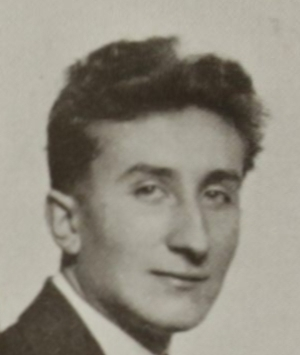
c. 1926

Thomas was professor of choral conducting at the Akademische Hochschule für Musik in Berlin from 1934 to 1939. During this time, he composed a cantata for the Olympic Games in Berlin in 1936, the Kantate zur Olympiade 1936 (Olympic Cantata 1936) as an entry for a competition of the Reichsmusikkammer, which won a silver medal. He became a member of the NSDAP in 1940, number 7.463.935.

From 1939 to 1945, Thomas was director of the Musisches Gymnasium Frankfurt (High school with main courses in music). Among his students were choral conductors Heinz Hennig and Hans-Joachim Rotzsch, composers Alfred Koerppen, Wolfgang Pasquay, Wolfgang Schoor, Siegfried Strohbach, Paul Kuhn, and organist Michael Schneider.

From 1945, Thomas was Kantor (church musician) at the Dreikönigskirche in Frankfurt. From 1947 to 1955, Thomas was professor of conducting, especially choral conducting, at the Nordwestdeutsche Musikakademie, now the Hochschule für Musik Detmold. His students there have included composers Manfred Kluge, Diether de la Motte and Gerd Zacher, and church musicians Alexander Wagner and Hermann Kreutz. He kept his position at the Dreikönigskirche to 1957.

Thomas was the Thomaskantor, the cantor of the Thomanerchor, from 1957 to 1960. He succeeded Günther Ramin on 1 April 1957. When a planned tour of the Thomanerchor to West Germany was cancelled in 1960, he left the post. From 1961, he conducted the concerts of the choir Bach-Verein Köln. Simultaneously, he founded in Frankfurt the concert choir Frankfurter Kantorei, mostly of members of the Kantorei of the Dreikönigskirche, and conducted the choir to 1969.

Thomas was also professor at the Musikhochschule Lübeck from 1965. He died in Bad Oeynhausen.

== Work ==
As a composer, Thomas focused on choral music. He returned to a cappella music which he combined with late-romantic musical idioms. Works such as his Messe in a-Moll (Mass in A minor) of 1924 and Markuspassion (St. Mark Passion) of 1927 were part of a reformed music in the Protestant churches after 1920. He published a book on choral conducting in three volumes, Lehrbuchs der Chorleitung, which was reprinted in 1991, revised and expanded.

- Mass in A minor for choir a cappella, Op. 1 (1924)
- Violin Sonata in E minor, Op. 2
- Markuspassion (1927)
- Psalm 137 (An den Wassern zu Babel saßen wir) for four-part choirs a cappella (1928)
- Weihnachtsoratorium, Op. 17 (1930/31); premiered 4 December 1931 by Staats- und Domchor Berlin
- Organ Variations, Op. 19, on "Es ist ein Schnitter, heißt der Tod" (1932)
- Motets, Op. 21, including
  - Fürwahr, er trug unsre Krankheit
  - Gott wird abwischen alle Tränen
  - Jauchzet Gott alle Lande
  - Herr, sei mir gnädig
  - Herr, ich habe lieb die Stätte deines Hauses
  - Von der ewigen Liebe
- Cantata for the Olympic Games, Op. 28 (1936)
- Festliche Musik für Orgel, Op. 35
- Saat und Ernte, Op. 36 (oratorio)
- Eichendorff-Kantate, Op. 37 (1938)
- Drei Abendlieder for mezzo-soprano and piano after Wolfram Brockmeier (1943)

== Recordings ==
Thomas recorded Bach's Christmas Oratorio twice, with choir and orchestra of the Detmold Akademy in 1951, and with the Thomanerchor in 1958, with the Gewandhausorchester and soloists Agnes Giebel, Marga Höffgen, Josef Traxel and Dietrich Fischer-Dieskau. He conducted several Bach cantatas with the Thomanerchor in a series Bach Made in Germany, including the first recording of Hermann Prey as the bassist in Ich will den Kreuzstab gerne tragen, BWV 56, and several secular cantatas.

== Literature ==
- Neithard Bethke: Kurt Thomas. Studien zu Leben und Werk. Merseburger, Kassel 1989, ISBN 3-87537-232-8.
- Werner Heldmann: Musisches Gymnasium Frankfurt am Main 1939 – 1945. Eine Schule im Spannungsfeld von pädagogischer Verantwortung, künstlerischer Freiheit und politischer Doktrin. Peter Lang, Frankfurt 2004, ISBN 3-631-51987-7.
- Manfred Kluge (ed.): Chorerziehung und neue Musik. Für Kurt Thomas zum 65. Geburtstag. Breitkopf & Härtel, Wiesbaden 1969.
- Corinna Wörner: Zwischen Anpassung und Resistenz. Der Thomanerchor Leipzig in zwei politischen Systemen. Studien und Materialien zur Musikwissenschaft, Bd. 123. Georg Olms Verlag, Hildesheim 2023. (Abstract) ISBN 978-3-487-16232-4
- Corinna Wörner:Zwischen Kulturpflege und Kulturpropaganda – Thomaner- und Kreuzchor als Kulturbotschafter der DDR, in: Ritter, Rüdiger (Hg.): Musik und ihre gesellschaftliche Bedeutung in den staats- und postsozialistischen Ländern Mittel- und Osteuropas seit 1945, (Ostmitteleuropa interdisziplinär, Bd. 3), Wiesbaden 2023, p. 217–235, ISBN 978-3-447-12113-2.
