= Eifel Music Festival =

The Eifel Music Festival (German: Eifeler Musikfest) is a church music festival that has been held every year since 1946 on the weekend after Pentecost at Steinfeld Abbey/Eifel. This makes it the oldest extant music festival in the Rhineland. Today, the county of Euskirchen is the responsible body in cooperation with the support association of Steinfeld Abbey.

== Concept ==
In keeping with the spirit of the monastic venue, the Eifel Music Festival is a Catholic church music festival. The festival's High Mass (Festhochamt) cultivates the tradition of the missa solemnis, the church service accompanied ceremonially by choir and orchestra. The highlight of the music festival is an oratorial concert on Sunday afternoon, at which great works of church music from Monteverdi to Bruckner are performed. Since the late 1950s, in addition to the church music concerts, there has been a concert of chamber music on Saturday evening with a "secular" programme is staged at various locations within the great monastery complex. From time to time, the festival programme is supplemented by an organ concert with well-known organists playing Steinfeld's Balthasar König Organ on the Sunday afternoon.

== Artists ==
Until 1963, the artistic direction was in the hands of Aachen Cathedral's director of music and founder, Professor Theodor Bernhard Rehmann (1895-1963). Conductors have included Wolfgang Sawallisch, Romanus Hubertus, Wolfgang Trommer and Hans Walter Kämpfel.

== History ==
The Eifel Music Festival was inaugurated in 1946 on the initiative of the Bishop of Aachen Johannes Joseph van der Velden and his Director of Music, Theodor Bernhard Rehmann. The idea was to bring "music culture" to the impoverished and war-damaged Eifel region. After a few years, the Eifel Music Festival developed into a popular folk festival in the region. As well as the festival's high mass and organ concert there was an open-air performance in the monastery courtyard; a symphony concert with the Sinfonieorchester Aachen and works mainly by Bruckner and Beethoven.

The Aachen Cathedral Choir also maintains the tradition of organizing the high mass at the Eifel Music Festival, initiated by Rudolf Pohl, who succeeded to Rehmann in the post of conductor of the Cathedral Choir. The afternoon oratorio concert was for many years in the hands of Bonn's Bach Choir, and its conductor Professor Gustav Classens. In the 1970s and 1980s, other renowned concert choirs from Cologne, Mainz and Düsseldorf also performed at the Eifel Music Festival.

== Literature ==
- Hans-Peter Göttgens: Das Eifeler Musikfest. In: Musikwissenschaftliches Institut der University of Cologne (publ.): Mitteilungen der Arbeitsgemeinschaft für rheinische Musikgeschichte e.V. No. 89, Cologne, 2007.
- Alfred Beaujean: 25 Jahre Eifeler Musikfest. In: Kreis Schleiden (publ.): Heimatjahrbuch 1970. Bonn, 1969.
