= Sinfonieorchester Aachen =

German symphonic orchestra

The Sinfonieorchester Aachen is the concert and opera orchestra of the Theater Aachen. It consists of about 70 musicians and performs about 140 times a year. The regular symphony concerts take place in the Eurogress Aachen.

== History ==
The Sinfonieorchester Aachen, formerly known as Städtisches Orchester Aachen, is one of the oldest orchestras in Germany that is directed by the city. In the beginning it consisted of military musicians of the city guard, supported by part-time string players. It was not until 1771 that the musicians applied for the establishment and performance of so-called concerts for the amusement of the respectable people, which had not existed in this form in Aachen before. In 1782 they finally got the new Redoute in Aachen's Komphausbadstraße, built by Jakob Couven as a concert hall. In 1787 Georg Zethner became the first Kapellmeister of the symphony orchestra. For the performance of Haydn's Oratorio The Creation in 1803, about half of the total of 48 orchestra members had been invited from outside to join the orchestra. On the occasion of the inauguration of the new municipal theatre on 28 March 1825 as part of the eighth Niederrheinisches Musikfest, which was held for the first time in Aachen, the orchestra including the choir was increased to 422 members in order to be able to perform under the direction of Ferdinand Ries. to be able to perform Beethoven's Symphony No. 9, although at that time some difficult passages were discreetly omitted. From then on, the orchestra regularly took part in this music festival, which was held until 1958, alternating between the cities of Elberfeld, Düsseldorf, Cologne and Aachen. It was occasionally conducted by foreign guest conductors such as Felix Mendelssohn Bartholdy, Julius Rietz, Max Bruch, Carl Reinecke, Richard Strauss, Hans Pfitzner, Clemens Krauss and Felix Weingartner. Guest performers such as the only 12-year-old César Franck also appeared more and more frequently. (1835), Johann Strauss, father (1836) or Jacques Offenbach (1843) with the orchestra. In 1841, the symphony orchestra made its first major tour abroad, leading to France.

After the foundation of the Aachener Instrumentalverein in 1844, which was to strengthen the city orchestra, the city council decided in 1852 to transform the orchestra, which was still made up of recreational musicians, into a permanent institution, which now employed professional musicians on a salaried basis. The Aachen Symphony Orchestra was thus the first of its kind in the Rhineland. Between 1862 and 1864, the musicians found a temporary home in the Bernarts-Theater in Aachen before they were able to settle down permanently in the theatre building. From this time on, the orchestra also offered regular winter subscriptions, musical project weeks and, from 1910, the well-known spa concerts. Depending on the programme, they were accompanied by various choral societies and choirs, which had been formed in large numbers in those years. To support the orchestra and as a link to the public, the "Gesellschaft der Theater- und Musikfreunde Aachen" was founded in 1924. In the meantime, the society has changed its name to accelerando – Freunde des Sinfonieorchester Aachen e.V.

During the Second World War, concert operations were maintained as far as possible. However, some of the performances took place in the auditorium or Talbothalle of the RWTH Aachen and in the Aachen Cathedral. After the war, the orchestra began to perform in a fortnightly rhythm from 1945 onwards, with performances from the Cathedral Music series. In 1946, it performed at the first music festival in the Steinfeld Abbey. After the reopening of the municipal theatre in 1951, the symphony orchestra used it as a concert hall. In the same year, it also resumed the spa concerts which had been interrupted during the war, and from 1958 it took over the musical arrangement of the Aachener Heiligtumsfahrt again. In addition, in the following years it gave numerous guest appearances at home and abroad as well as regular joint events with the Aachener Domchor, the Sinfonischer Chor Aachen, the Aachener Bachverein, Der Junge Chor Aachen and the Cappella Aquensis.

Some later very famous conductors like Fritz Busch, Herbert von Karajan and Wolfgang Sawallisch started their career in Aachen.

== Kapellmeister and music directors ==
- 1787–1794 Georg Zethner (municipal Kapellmeister)
- 1804–1823 Karl Matthias Engels
- 1823–1825 Paul Kreutzer (new title: Municipal Director of Music)
- 1825–1827 Justus Amadeus Lecerf
- 1828–1832 Wilhelm Telle
- 1834–1835 Ferdinand Ries
- 1835–1840 Anton Felix Schindler (at the same time also Domkapellmeister at the Aachener Dom)
- 1841–1842 Wenzel Heinrich Veit
- 1842–1857 Karl von Turanyi
- 1858–1865 Franz Wüllner
- 1865–1883 Ferdinand Breunung
- 1884–1887 Julius Kniese
- 1887–1912 Eberhard Schwickerath (1893–1898 Leo Blech, Kapellmeister)
- 1912–1919 Fritz Busch
- 1920–1935 Peter Raabe (new title: General Music Director) (1927–1932 Paul Pella musikalischer Oberleiter)
- 1935–1942 Herbert von Karajan
- 1942–1944 Paul van Kempen
- 1945–1946 Theodor Bernhard Rehmann (provisional, full-time cathedral conductor 1924–1963)
- 1946–1953 Felix Raabe (son of Peter Raabe)
- 1953–1958 Wolfgang Sawallisch
- 1958–1962 Hans Walter Kämpfel
- 1962–1975 Wolfgang Trommer
- 1974–1983 Gabriel Chmura
- 1983–1984 Jean-François Monnard (provisional music director)
- 1984–1990 Yoram David
- 1990–1992 Bruce Ferden
- 1992–1993 Stefan Lano (provisional music director)
- 1993–1996 Yukio Kitahara
- 1996–1997 Elio Boncompagni (provisional music director)
- 1997–2002 Elio Boncompagni
- 2002–2012 Marcus Bosch
- 2012–2017 Kazem Abdullah
- 2017–2018 Justus Thorau (provisional general music director)
- from 2018 Christopher Ward

== Recording ==
Marcus Bosch with the Sinfonieorchester Aachen

- Ludwig van Beethoven: Missa solemnis, Alexandra Coku (soprano), Daniela Denschlag (alto), Andreas Scheidegger (tenor), Martin Berner (bass), Choir of the vocapella, live recording of the cathedral concert on 9 February 2008, (Coviello Classics)
- Johannes Brahms: Symphony No. 1 C minor op. 68 and Symphony No. 4 in E minor op. 98, 2007 (Coviello Classics)
- Johannes Brahms: A German Requiem op 45, Live recording of the cathedral concert of 24 February 2007 (Coviello Classics)
- Anton Bruckner: Symphony No. 8 in C minor, live recording of the concert "Bruckner in St. Nikolaus" on 9 June 2003 (Coviello Classics)
- Anton Bruckner: Symphony No. 7 in E major, live recording of the concert "Bruckner in St. Nikolaus" on 31 May 2004 (Coviello Classics)
- Anton Bruckner: Symphony No. 5 B flat major, live recording of the concert "Bruckner in St. Nikolaus" on 16 May 2005 (Coviello Classics)
- Anton Bruckner: Symphony No. 3 in D minor, live recording of the concert "Bruckner in St. Nikolaus" on 5 June 2006 (Coviello Classics)
- Anton Bruckner: Symphony No. 4 in E flat major, live recording of the concert "Bruckner in St. Nicholas" on 1 June 2008 (Coviello Classics)
- Anton Bruckner: Symphony No. 2 in C minor, live recording of the concert "Bruckner in St. Nikolaus" on 24 May 2010 (Coviello Classics)
- Anton Bruckner: Symphony No. 6 in A major, live recording of the concert "Bruckner in St. Nikolaus" on 1 June 2009 (Coviello Classics)
- Anton Bruckner: Symphony No. 9 in D minor, live recording of the "Bruckner concert in St. Nicholas" on 28 May 2007 (Coviello Classics)
- Georg Friedrich Händel: Alexanderfestkonzert HWV 318 – oder Die Macht der Musik, Live recording of the concert in the Old Kurhaus on 5 May 2007
- Gustav Mahler: Symphony No. 2 in C minor "Auferstehung", Carola Höhn (soprano), Anke Vondung (mezzo-soprano), Live recording of the concert on the occasion of the reopening of the Eurogress Aachen 17 September 2005
- Felix Mendelssohn Bartholdy: Symphony No. 1 in C minor, op 11 and Symphony No. 5 D major/d minor, op. 107, Live recording of the 7th and 8th symphony concert 2009 (Coviello Classics/Deutschlandradion Kultur)
- Wolfgang Amadeus Mozart: Krönungsmesse KV 317, Exsultate, jubilate KV 165, Vesperae solennes de Confessore KV 339, Ave verum KV 618, Dorothee Mields (soprano), Mélanie Forgeron (mezzo-soprano), Christoph Wittmann (tenor), Martin Berner (baritone), Chor der vocapella, Live recording of the cathedral concert on 4 March 2006 (Coviello Classics)
- Wolfgang Amadeus Mozart: concertos for two pianos KV 365, piano duo Anna and Ines Walachowski (Oehms Classics)
- Wolfgang Amadeus Mozart: Requiem d-Moll KV 626, Ave verum KV 618, Judith Kuhn (soprano), Gabriele May (alto), Michael König (tenor), Claudius Muth (bass), Choir of the vocapella, Live recording of the cathedral concert on 8 March 2003 (Verlag Friedrich Bischoff GmbH)
- Marijn Simons: Secret notes op. 19, a tí te toca op. 23, symphony No. 1 op. 26, piano duo Anna & Ines Walachowski, Live recording of the symphony concert on 15 and 16 December 2004 (NorthWest Classics)
- Mikis Theodorakis: Rhapsody for Cello and Orchestra, Suite from Les amants de Téruel, Johannes Moser (violoncello), Live recording of the concert for the award of the IMC-UNESCO Music Prize to Mikis Theodorakis on 4 November 2005 (Coviello Classics)
- Giuseppe Verdi: Messa da Requiem, Melba Ramos (soprano), Gabriele May (Alt), Michael Ende (tenor), Martin Blasius (bass), Choir of the vocapella, Live recording of the cathedral concert on 12 February 2005, (Coviello Classics)
