= Péter Halász (conductor) =

Hungarian conductor

- Born: July 23, 1976 (age 49); Budapest, Hungarian People's Republic
- Genres: Classical music
- Occupation(s): Conductor, pianist
- Instrument: Piano
- Years active: 2002 – present
- Website: www.peter-halasz.com

Péter Halász (born July 23, 1976) is a Hungarian conductor.

== Life and career ==
Péter Halász was born in Budapest. After studying piano and composition in his native city, he went on to study conducting under Leopold Hager at Universitaet für Musik und darstellende Kunst in Wien. He took master classes in Lucerne as a student of Bernard Haitink. He has been massively influenced by Ádám Fischer to whom he acted as assistant at the Haydn Festival Eisenstadt.

After completing his studies, Péter Halász coached young singers as a member of the International Opera Studio at Opernhaus Zürich (2001-2002). Following this, he was engaged as a conductor by Staatstheater Mainz where he led fifteen different productions (2003-2010).

From 2011 Péter Halász was the deputy music director of Theater Aachen and Sinfonieorchester Aachen. In his two seasons he conducted the premieres of Salvatore Sciarrino’s Superflumina, Rossini’s La Cenerentola, Johann Strauss’s Die Fledermaus, Verdi’s Un ballo in maschera, and Poulenc’s La voix humaine together with Monteverdi’s Il combattimento di Tancredi e Clorinda. With the premieres in Aachen of Ariodante and Alcina, he initiated a Handel cycle played on period instruments. He additionally conducted performances of Bizet's Carmen, Humperdinck's Hänsel und Gretel, and Verdi's Simon Boccanegra, while Tristan und Isolde was significant as the first time he had conducted a Wagner opera.

It was at the invitation of Ádám Fischer that Péter made his debut at the Hungarian State Opera with Rossini’s Il barbiere di Siviglia in 2010. Since then he has regularly led repertoire performances in Budapest, including Verdi’s Rigoletto, Nabucco, and La traviata; Puccini’s Turandot, Madama Butterfly, and La bohéme; Mozart’s Don Giovanni and Le nozze die Figaro; and Johann Strauss’s Die Fledermaus.

As music director of the Hungarian State Opera from 2013 to 2016, Péter Halász was responsible for many successful, critically acclaimed premieres. The first of these was Verdi’s Falstaff, timed to coincide with the two hundredth anniversary of the composer’s birth. In 2014 he premiered the first ever domestic performance of Richard Strauss’s Die Frau ohne Schatten. In collaboration with Academy Award–winning director Jiri Menzel, he presented Mozart’s Cosí fan tutte. In the same season he also conducted Weber’s Der Freischütz. 2015 saw the inception of a brand-new production of Wagner’s Ring cycle with Das Rheingold, which was followed by Die Walküre in 2016, and Siegfried in 2017. When in 2016, Thomas Adès’ The Tempest received its first ever Eastern European performance, it was also the first occasion on which a stage work by the preeminent contemporary composer had been performed in Hungary.

In 2016, he was the conductor for Plácido Domingo’s gala concert, which was the great tenor’s first ever performance at the Hungarian State Opera.

Péter Halász has also conducted gala concerts by such world-famous singers as Angela Gheorghiu, Vesselina Kassarova, Piotr Beczala, and Feruccio Furlanetto.

In 2017, he was awarded the Golden Cross of the Order of Merit of the Hungarian Republic.

In 2015, Péter Halász was invited to join Staatsoper Hamburg, where he made his debut with Puccini’s Manon Lescaut. He also worked as a guest conductor at many other German opera houses – Baadisches Staatstheater Karlsruhe, Staatstheater Kassel, Saarlaendisches Staatstheater, Musiktheater im Revier Gelsenkirchen, Staatstheater Braunschweig.

In 2016, Zoltán Kocsis personally invited him to conduct the Hungarian National Philharmonic Orchestra. In 2017, Péter Halász led the Staatsorchester Nürnberg for a concert of Hungarian composers. He has also led concerts by the Budapest Philharmonic Orchestra, the MAV Symphony Orchestra (Budapest), Nordwestdeutsche Philharmonie, Staatsorchester Mainz, Sinfonieorchester Aachen, and Radio Sinfonieorchester Wien.
