= Theodor Szántó =

Hungarian pianist and composer (1878- 1934)

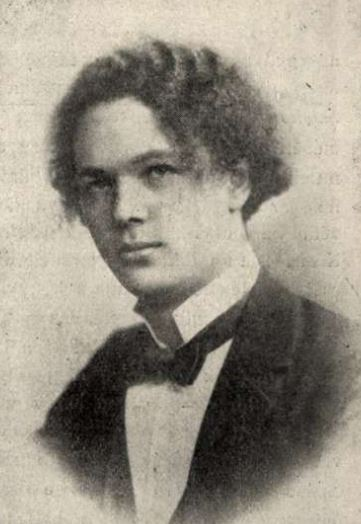
Tivadar Szántó

Theodor Szántó, also seen as Tivadar Szántó (3 June 1877 – 7 January 1934) was a Hungarian Jewish pianist and composer.

== Life and career ==
Szántó was born in Vienna, then the capital of the Austro-Hungarian Empire. His family name was originally Smulevic, of Jewish and Slavic origin. His musical studies were in Vienna and Budapest, and with Ferruccio Busoni in Berlin 1898-1901. He resided in Paris from 1905, Switzerland from 1914, and Budapest from 1921 until his death there in 1934.

Szántó contributed substantially to the rewriting of the piano part of the third and final version of Frederick Delius’s Piano Concerto in C minor, and he introduced this version at a Prom Concert in London on 22 October 1907 under Henry Wood. For these services, Delius dedicated the Concerto to Szántó. He also played the work at the Proms in 1912, 1913 and 1921. This final version has become the standard version, but Delius's original conception has also been recorded.

Theodor Szántó was an early champion of the music of Zoltán Kodály and Béla Bartók. It was his playing of Bartók's Romanian Dance in 1914 that introduced Arthur Hartmann to the music of that composer. For his part, however, Bartók had little respect for Szántó.

He exhibited an interest in the music of Japan by writing at least three works using Japanese influences (an opera, an orchestral suite, and a piano suite).

He also made some piano transcriptions of works by Johann Sebastian Bach and Igor Stravinsky, which reveal a virtuoso technique. His complete piano works are recorded by the composer and virtuoso pianist Artur Cimirro for the CD label Acte Préalable

Szanto was considered an important piano teacher. His students included Berta Alves de Sousa in Paris.

Szántó was awarded the Legion of Honour.

== Compositions ==
=== Original works ===
Szántó's own original compositions include:

- Violin Sonata, 1906
- Land and Sea Symphony, 1909
- Contrasts, piano suite, 1912
- Variations on a Hungarian Folksong, piano, 1915
- Symphonic Rhapsody, 1917
- In Japan: Essays and Studies in Japanese Harmony based on Native Songs, piano, 1918-22 (This work has been recorded by Noriko Ogawa)
- Taifun: A Japanese Tragedy in Three Acts an opera on a Japanese subject, set to a libretto by Menyhert Lengyel based on his play Typhoon; the opera was premiered in Mannheim on 29 November 1924, and had later productions in Antwerp, Budapest and Vienna
- Japan Suite, orchestra, 1926
- Magyarorszag: Concert Sonata in Hungarian style, violin and piano; dedicated to Eugène Ysaÿe

=== Transcriptions ===
- Johann Sebastian Bach: About a dozen transcriptions, including:
  - Fantasia and Fugue in G minor, BWV 542, 1904 (This has been recorded by Cyprien Katsaris and Marc-André Hamelin)
  - Prelude and Fugue in A minor, BWV 543,1912
  - Prelude and Fugue in C minor, BWV 546, 1914
  - Passacaglia in C minor, BWV 582, 1932
  - 4 Organ Chorale Preludes, c. 1900
    - Aus der Tiefe rufe ich
    - Ach bleib bei uns, Herr Jesu Christ, BWV 649
    - Jesu Leiden, Pein und Tod on Paul Stockmann's "Jesu Leiden, Pein und Tod"
    - Allein Gott in der Hoh sei Ehr, BWV 663
- Igor Stravinsky:
  - Suite of five pieces from Petrushka, 1922
    - "Fète populaire de la semaine grasse"
    - "Chez Petrouchka"
    - "Chez le maure"
    - "Danse de la ballerina"
    - "Danse russe"
  - "Marche chinoise" from Le Rossignol

== Discography ==
- 2017 : Acte Préalable AP0386 – Tivadar Szántó - Complete Piano Works 1 (Artur Cimirro)
- 2017 : Acte Préalable AP0387 – Tivadar Szántó - Complete Piano Works 2 (Artur Cimirro)
