= Géza Zichy =

Hungarian pianist and composer (1849–1924)

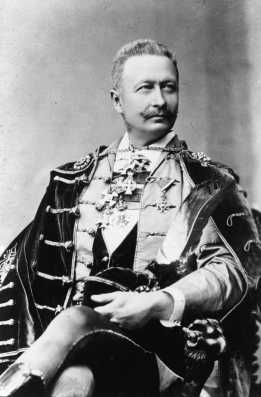
Géza Zichy

Count Géza Zichy (23 July 1849 – 14 January 1924) was a Hungarian composer and was also renowned as the world's first professional one-armed pianist. Zichy also published an autobiography ("Aus meinem Leben", 3 vols, 1911–24) and some poetry.

== Biography ==
Zichy was born in Sztára Castle in 1849. He came from a noble family and held the title Count Vasony-Keö. Zichy lost his right arm in a hunting accident at age 14 or 15. Instead of despairing, he redoubled his efforts to become a true piano virtuoso. “I closed the door,” he says in his memoirs, “and got dressed alone. The door handle, the furniture, my legs, my teeth all helped. At lunch, I did not eat any food that I could not cut myself and did not accept the slightest service. Today I peel apples, cut my nails myself, dress alone, ride, drive four-in-hand, I am a good hunter with bullets and buckshot, and I even learned to play the piano a bit. You can be independent with one hand, you just have to know how." So, he persevered by writing and performing piano music for the left hand. In 1873 he began six years of study with Franz Liszt. He also studied under Robert Volkmann.

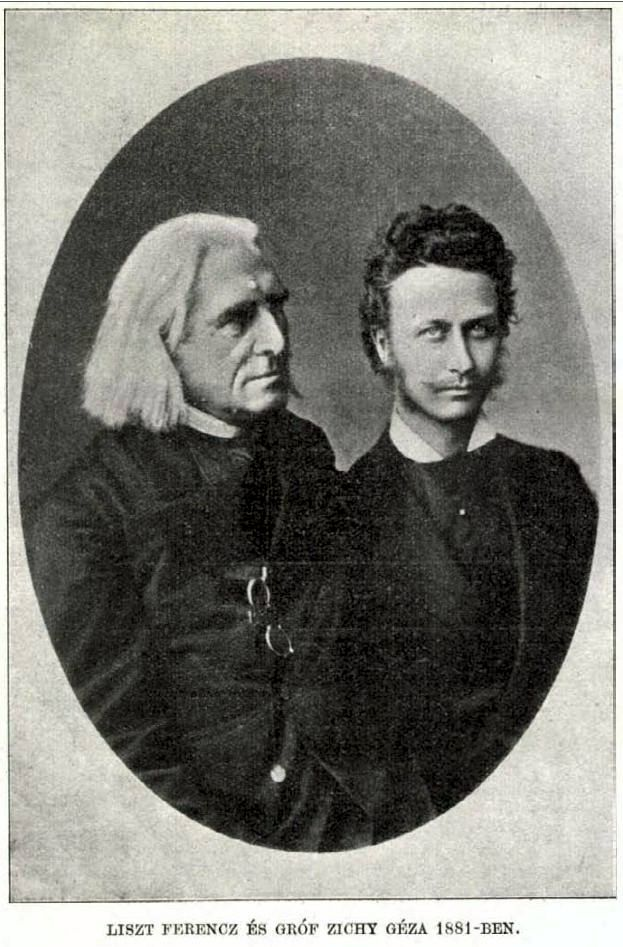
Geza Zichy and Franz Liszt in 1881

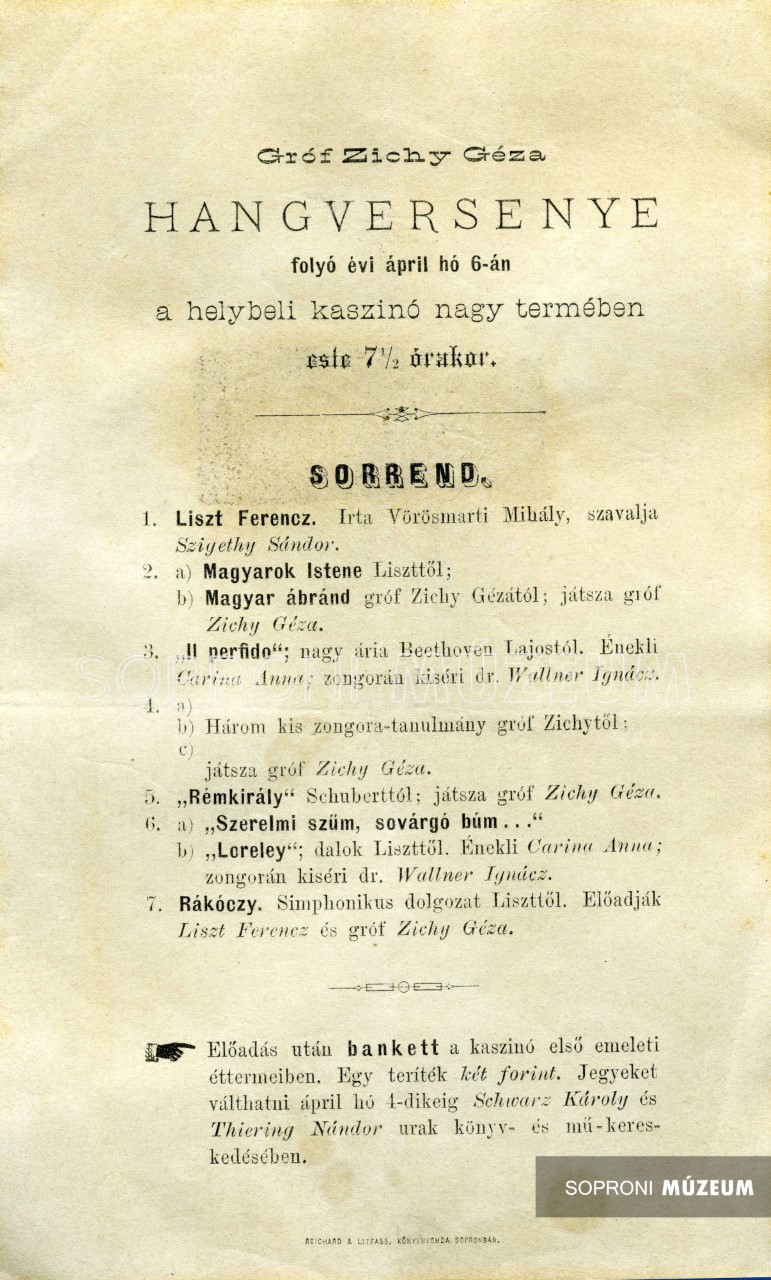
Géza Zichy's concert program in 1881 in Sopron. Liszt and Zichy performed the last piece together.

In spite of his limitations, Zichy had a successful career as both a concert pianist and a composer for the next 40 years. He gave entire concerts playing music only for the left hand, the proceeds of which he gave to charity as he was independently wealthy. He was known for his artistic sensitivity as well as dextrous playing and had several admirers; including Franz Liszt who wrote glowing reviews of his performances in letters to friends. The Viennese critic Eduard Hanslick, who pulled no punches, said Zichy's playing was "the greatest marvel of modern times on the piano".

From 1891 to 1894 he was Intendant of the Royal Hungarian Opera. His appointment spelled the end of Gustav Mahler's term as music director. He died in Budapest in 1924, aged 74.

== Works ==
Among Zichy's many compositions was a left-hand piano concerto and several operas. In addition to his music career, Zichy also worked as a lawyer. An entire chapter is devoted to Zichy in Piano Music for One Hand by Theodore Edel (Indiana University Press), a comprehensive survey of music written for those pianists who have the use of only one hand. The Brazilian composer and virtuoso pianist Artur Cimirro has recorded Zichy's entire piano output for the CD label Acte Préalable. According to Jonathan Welsh:„it is hard to believe there is only one hand at work here as the level of detail to be heard is incredible” or „We finish with the impossibly difficult arrangement of Schubert's Erlkönig for left hand. Here all four voiced sections of Schubert’s masterpiece are presented with just five fingers. The effect is incredible, not just for the pianist; it also shows off Zichy's considerable powers as an arranger.” Zichy's compositions are also part of the repertoire of British pianist Nicholas McCarthy.

Operas

- A vár története (1888)
- Alár (1896)
- Roland mester (1899)
- Nemo (1905)
- Rákóczi Ferenz (1909)
- Radostó (1912)

Ballet

- Gemma, ballet

Vocal

- Dolores, cantata (1889)
- songs

Transcriptions for the left hand alone

- J. S. Bach - Chaconne BWV 1004
- F. Chopin - Polonaise in A major op. 40 no. 1
- F. Liszt - Nocturne no. 3 'Liebestraum'
- Fantasie über Motive aus Wagner 'Tannhäuser'

Arrangements for the left hand alone

- Rákóczy March

Piano left-hand

- Sonata
- Four Studies
- Six Studies (1878; preface by Liszt)
- Deux Morceaux
- Liebestraum-Fantasie
- Concerto in E flat for piano and orchestra (1902)

Piano two hands

- Liszt-March
- Idyll
- Nász-Gavotte
- Entrance and King's Anthem (from the opera Alár)

== Discography ==
- 2016 : Acte Préalable AP0371 – Géza Zichy - Complete Piano Works (Artur Cimirro)
- 2016 : Acte Préalable AP0372 – Géza Zichy - Complete Piano Transcriptions (Artur Cimirro)
- 2015 : Parlaphone Records - Solo (Liszt/Zichy: Liebesträume Nr 3), (Nicholas McCarthy)
