= Betty Humby Beecham =

British pianist

Betty Humby Beecham, Lady Beecham (8 April 1908 – 2 September 1958) was a British pianist. She married English conductor and impresario Sir Thomas Beecham in February 1943.

== Biography ==
Betty Humby was the daughter of Daniel Morgan Humby, a dentist and member of the Royal College of Surgeons. At the age of 10, she was the youngest person ever to win a scholarship to the Royal Academy of Music, where she also won the Sterndale Bennett Prize. When she was 14, she taught 30 pupils of her own, and two years later she became a piano professor, under Myra Hess at Tobias Matthay's London music school. Later she married an Anglican priest, the Reverend H. Cashel Thomas, who in the early 1940s was vicar of St Philip's in London. They had a son, Sir Jeremy Cashel Thomas, born 1 June 1931; who became a diplomat.

With the outbreak of World War II, Thomas organised concerts in British cathedrals. In 1940, she left Britain for the United States with her young son, Jeremy. While in the US she hoped to raise money for London's Great Ormond Street Hospital, where her brother was chief surgeon. Having first met in the 1930s in England, Humby and Sir Thomas Beecham were reintroduced in the US by Andrew Schulhof, who managed each of them. He later arranged for them to perform the Delius piano concerto together in June 1941 at a studio concert for CBS. Humby married Beecham on 19 January 1943, one month after a divorce was granted from Beecham's wife Utica Celestina Welles. According to John Lucas's biography, Thomas Beecham: An Obsession with Music, they were married before a police justice in Manhattan. On the advice of their legal advisers, in order to "assure compliance with the technicalities of English law", they underwent a second marriage on 7 September 1944, before Supreme Court Justice Samuel Null in his chambers at County Court House, New York.

Her best-known recording is probably that of the Delius Piano Concerto, with her husband conducting the Royal Philharmonic Orchestra, in October 1946, shortly after he had founded it. This recording of 1946 replaced an earlier version, made with the London Philharmonic Orchestra on 3 October 1945, which was not released. According to the Lucas biography, her performance of the Delius concerto at Lafayette, Indiana, on 1 December 1950, marked the end of Lady Betty's playing career.

She died of a heart attack in Buenos Aires, Argentina, in 1958, aged 50. She was cremated there and the ashes returned to England. They had been in Argentina for Beecham to conduct The Magic Flute and Fidelio at the Teatro Colón. He cancelled two rehearsals the next day, but continued his schedule. The last night of Fidelio was also his swansong as an opera conductor.
