= Carlos Veerhoff =

Argentine-born German composer

Carlos Enrique Veerhoff (3 June 1926 in Buenos Aires – 18 February 2011 in Murnau) was an Argentine-born German composer of classical music.

== Life and work ==
Carlos Enrique Veerhoff was born with his twin brother, Wolfgang Otto, as premature infants. Their father could only find a hospital with an incubator two days later, so that the birth date in the birth certificate is 5 June 1926, not the correct date of 3 June.

His father, Heinrich Veerhoff, was German and the head of an own company in Buenos Aires. His mother, Karla, was a violinist and the daughter of conductor Karl Panzner and singer Ida Panzner.

The Veerhoff family moved back to Germany in 1930 due to a job change by the father.

In 1933, the family moved on to South Africa. The countryside and the way of living in Africa had a great impact on the young Carlos Veerhoff, and these impressions found their way into several compositions of his later years. Another experience in South Africa was important for him as well: In 1935, the first South African airline was founded, and the young Carlos got the opportunity to take part at a pleasure flight.

Afterwards, he developed an enormous interest in flight engineering, which was only replaced later by music. But Carlos Veerhoff kept his love of natural science his whole life.

After the return of the Veerhoff family to Germany in 1935, Carlos started to attend orchestral and chamber music concerts. Also, the music played at home - his father was a good pianist and his mother a professional violinist - contributed to his future interest in classical music. This development culminated in Carlos deciding at the age of 15 to become a composer. At that time, he took his first lesson in composition theory, and in 1942 he became a student at the Musisches Gymnasium in Frankfurt am Main.

After a six-day stint as a soldier in World War II in which he was injured, Carlos Veerhoff continued his composition studies at the Universität der Künste Berlin with Hermann Grabner and later privately with Kurt Thomas and got piano lessons from Walter Gieseking. During an internment in Düsseldorf in 1946, he studied with Walter Braunfels (composition) and Günter Wand (conducting) at the Hochschule für Musik und Tanz Köln.

In 1947, Carlos Veerhoff moved to Argentina and taught music theory at the university of San Miguel de Tucumán at the Departemento Musical, which was newly founded by Ernst von Dohnányi. He also took conducting lessons from Hermann Scherchen in Buenos Aires during this period.

In 1950, Ferenc Fricsay was looking for a composition by an Argentine composer for an upcoming concert in Buenos Aires. From a selection of compositions, he chose the "Musica concertante for chamber orchestra" by Carlos Veerhoff and later conducted the world premiere. Fricsay offered him a position as an assistant to him, so Carlos Veerhoff followed Fricsay to Berlin. But from his point of view, the atmosphere in Germany was anti-artistic, and he returned to Argentina just a year later.

In the following decades, Carlos Veerhoff created dozens of compositions, nearly all of which were performed. In many cases, renowned and acclaimed musicians performed the world premieres of his works: Hans Rosbaud ("Mirages"), Ruggiero Ricci (Violin concerto No. 1), Bruno Maderna ("Cantos"), Stanislaw Skrowaczewski ("Gesänge auf dem Wege"), Ladislav Kupkovic ("Gesänge aus Samsara" and Symphony No. 4), Homero Francesch (Piano concerto No. 1), Gerhard Oppitz (Piano concerto No. 2), Thomas Zehetmair (Violin concerto No. 2) or Peter Sadlo (Percussion concerto No. 2).

Despite his success and the performances of his music, Carlos Veerhoff remained a musical outsider:

Carlos Veerhoff remained a composer in the German musical life who did not follow actual composition fashions. He called himself "clique-free" and paid this freedom with the fact that he was never offered a professorship and could not find a renowned publishing house for his compositions. Among the circle of influential German composers and critics he was never accepted as a real avant-gardist, because his advancement of the dodecaphony was unorthodox and beside all contemporary aspects always kept references to tradition.

Due to his exclusion from the close music establishment in Germany, Carlos Veerhoff often went back to Argentina. Only from 1970 on did he permanently stay in Germany to his death. From 1988, he lived in Murnau, Bavaria, near Munich. His collection of papers is archived at the Bayerische Staatsbibliothek.

== Compositions ==
=== Orchestral works ===
- op. 9: Symphony No. 1 "Sinfonica Panta Rhei" (1953/54, WP 14 September 1961)
- op. 15: Symphony No. 2 (1958, WP 1958)
- op. 22: Symphony No. 3 "Spirales" (1968, revised version 1971, WP 1968)
- op. 32: Symphony No. 4 (1972/73, WP 1979)
- op. 43: Symphony No. 5 for strings (1975)
- op. 70: Symphony No. 6 "Desiderata" for narrator, 3 soloists, choir and orchestra (1985/96, WP: 30. April 1997, Leipzig)
- op. 0: Musica concertante, for chamber orchestra (1950, WP 1950)
- op. 3: Sinfonische Inventionen, for orchestra (1951, WP 1952)
- op. 5: Movimiento Sinfonico, for orchestra (1952, WP 1955)
- op. 16: Mirages, for orchestra (1961, WP 1962)
- op. 18: Prolog, for orchestra (1956, WP 1966)
- op. 20: Gesänge auf dem Wege, for baritone and orchestra (1966, WP 1967)
- op. 21: Akróasis, for orchestra (1966, WP 1966)
- op. 26: Textur, for string orchestra (1970, WP 1971)
- op. 29: Sinotrauc, for orchestra (1972, WP 1972)
- op. 30: Torso, for orchestra (1972, WP 1972)
- op. 39: Dorefami, for orchestra (1974, WP 1981)
- op. 45: Concertino da camera (1978, WP 1979)
- op. 59: 5 Bagatellen for wind orchestra (1974)

=== Concertos ===
- op. 40: 1. Violin concerto (1976, WP 1977)
- op. 44: 1. Piano concerto (1978/79, WP 1979)
- op. 46: 1. Percussion concerto (1982, WP 1984)
- op. 55: Concerto for 2 violins and orchestra (1983, WP 1984)
- op. 63: Concerto for cello, double bass and orchestra (1990, WP 1990)
- op. 66: 2. Piano concerto (1989, WP 1990)
- op. 67: 2. Percussion concerto (1994, WP 1994)
- op. 69: 2. Violin concerto (1992, WP 1993)
- op. 72: 3. Piano concerto (2005, WP: 6. February 2009, Munich, Musica Viva)

=== Chamber music ===
- op. 1: 1. String quartet (1949, WP 1951)
- op. 7: Mosaicos, for piano (1952, WP 1954)
- op. 10: Sonant for violin solo (1956, Neufassung 1974, WP 1974)
- op. 11: Kaleidoskop, for piano (1953)
- op. 14: 1. Wind quintet for flute, oboe, clarinet, bassoon and horn (1961, WP 1961)
- op. 25: Dialogues 1, for saxophone and piano (1966, WP 1966)
- op. 27: 2. Wind quintet (1972, WP 1973)
- op. 33: 2. String quartet (1972, WP 1974)
- op. 37: 1. Brass quintet for 2 trumpets, horn, trombone and tuba (1975, WP 1975)
- op. 41: Nonett (1976, WP 1977)
- op. 47: Sonata for violin and piano (1982, WP 1983)
- op. 48: Divertimento per tre, for violin, double bass and clarinet (1979, WP 1980)
- op. 49: Sonant Nr.2 for cello and double bass (1982, WP 1982)
- op. 50: Moments Musicaux, for saxophone, accordion and percussion (1982, WP 1982)
- op. 52: 2. Brass quintet (1982, WP 1983)
- op. 53: Piano sonata (1985, WP 1988)
- op. 56: 1. String trio (1983, WP 1987)
- op. 58: 7 mal 1, for percussion solo (1987, WP 1987)
- op. 60: Ballade for accordion (1986, WP 1986)
- op. 61: Corimba for percussion (unfinished)
- op. 61: Dialogues 2, for viola and percussion (1986, WP 1987)
- op. 62: 2. String trio (1991, WP 1991)
- op. 64: Sobre la plata, for vibraphone, glockenspiel and crotales (unfinished)
- op. 65: Aphorismen for viola solo (1990, WP 1992)
- op. 68: Trio for horn, violin and piano (1992, WP 1992)
- op. 71: Sonata for viola and piano (1999, WP 2000)

=== Vocal music ===
- o. op.: Songs for high voice (1952, WP 1952)
- op. 2: Altdeutsche Lieder, for soprano and piano (1951, WP 1951)
- op. 4: Lieder vom Meer, for baritone and piano (1951, WP 1951)
- op. 6: Heitere Lieder, for baritone and piano (1951, WP 1952)
- op. 19: Cantos for high voice and 7 instruments on poems by Hans Magnus Enzensberger (1965, WP 21. August 1966, Darmstadt)
- op. 24: Ut omnes unum sint, for bass and 4 winds (1975, WP 1989)
- op. 38: Ringelnatz-Duette, for soprano, alto and piano (1975, WP 1975)
- op. 51: Pater Noster, for chorus and orchestra (1985, WP 1988)
- op. 54: Alpha-Zeta Burleske for A-cappella-chorus (1986, WP 2002)
- op. 57: Allegretto Cabaretto, for voice, piano and percussion

=== Stage music ===
- Pavane royal, ballet (1949/50)
- Targusis (Carlos H. Veerhoff), opera, op. 13 (1955–1958), withdrawn
- El porquerizo del rey (Hans Christian Andersen), ballet, op. 12 (1958–1962; WP 1963 Buenos Aires)
- Tanz des Lebens/Der letzte Gast (Fred Schneckenberger), puppet-opera, op. 17 (1962/63; WP 1963 Zürich)
- Die Goldene Maske (Carlos H Veerhoff), opera, op. 23 (1967/68)
- Es gibt noch Zebrastreifen (Edith Sartorius), miniature-opera, op. 28 (1971; WP 1973 Ulm)
- Die Manipulatoren (Carlos H Veerhoff), miniature-opera, op. 31 (1971), unfinished
- Dualis, ballet, op. 42 (1975/76; WP 1976 München)
- Der Grüne (Carlos H. Veerhoff), miniature-opera, op. 34 (1982), unfinished
- Der Schützling (Ephraim Kishon/Carlos H. Veerhoff), opera, op. 56 (1990)
- Mana (Carlos H. Veerhoff), opera, op.73 (2007)
- Gesänge aus Samsâra or Gesänge aus Sangsâra for soprano, tape, voices and orchestra, radio play, op.36 (1976, WP 6. November 1978, Stuttgart)
