= Berta Alves de Sousa =

Portuguese pianist and composer

Berta Alves de Sousa

Berta Alves de Sousa (8 April 1906 – 1 August 1997) was a Portuguese pianist and composer.

== Biography ==
Candida Berta Alves de Sousa was born in Liège, Belgium. She grew up in Porto, Portugal and studied at the Music Conservatory. She continued her studies in Paris with Wilhelm Backhaus and Theodor Szántó for piano and George Mingot for composition, and in Lisbon with Vianna da Motta. She also studied orchestral conducting with Clemens Krauss in Berlin and Pedro de Freitas Branco in Lisbon.

After completing her studies, Alves de Sousa took a position at the Music Conservatory of Porto in 1946 teaching chamber music, (she later became chair) and performed as a concert pianist, accompanist and conductor. She also worked as a music critic for the newspaper O Primeiro de Janeiro in Porto.

In 1941, she was awarded the Prix de Sa Moreira established by Orpheon Portuense. Alves de Sousa died in Porto at the age of 91, and her documents are archived by the Porto Conservatory of Music.

== Works ==
Alves de Sousa composed chamber music, choral music and symphonic works. She also experimented with Symmetry Sonora, a method developed by composer Fernando Corrêa de Oliveira.

Selected works include:

- Abreu Albano
- Teixeira de Pascoaes
- Há no Meu Peito uma Porta (In My Chest there is a Door)
- Canção Marinha (Navy Song)
- Três Prelúdios (Three Preludes)

=== Discography ===
Selected recordings include:

- Compositores do Porto do Séc. XX, Canto e Piano
- Numérica 1999, Sofia Lourenço, Compositores Portugueses Contemporâneos
