= Karl Panzner =

German conductor and generalmusicdirector

Karl Panzner (2 March 1866 – 7 December 1923) was a German conductor and musikdirektor in Düsseldorf.

== Life ==
Born in Teplice, Panzner was the son of a merchant, who lived in Dresden since 1869. Panzner received private piano lessons in his youth. After attending grammar school, he graduated from the Dresdner Konservatorium with an education as a conductor.

After that, he took over a position as a conductor at the Wuppertaler Bühnen, which was newly built in 1888, around 1890. Three years later he moved to Leipzig, where he became first Kapellmeister at the Neue Theater and later also conducted the Gewandhaus orchestra at the Leipzig Opera. His performance of the opera Der Ring des Nibelungen by Richard Wagner was successful in 1899

In 1899, Panzner moved to Bremen, where he became director of the concerts of the Bremer Philharmoniker, the philharmonic choir and in 1904 also of the Lehrergesangverein. From 1907, he was also conductor of the Berlin Mozart Orchestra. In 1902, he got the title of a professor in Bremen. From 1904 he made guest appearances with the Lehrergesangverein.

On 1 October 1908 he was called to Düsseldorf, where he succeeded Julius Buths, who had left the orchestra at short notice. He conducted the first concerts with the Düsseldorf Symphony Orchestra and was appointed municipal music director for the 1909 season. Panzner spent a successful time here and was counted by several music critics among the ten best conductors of his time. Panzner drew attention above all as a lover of the works of Hector Berlioz and as a Mahler interpreter, especially with the first performance of Mahler's Symphony No. 8 in Düsseldorf in December 1912. This was called Symphony of a Thousand because of the 125-member orchestra, the participation of the philharmonic choirs from Düsseldorf and Elberfeld as well as the Düsseldorf Children's Choir and thus a total of over 1000 active musicians. Before the beginning of the First World War, he was twice able to direct the Niederrheinisches Musikfest, which, due to the war, could only be held again in Düsseldorf in 1926.

During his tenure, several Düsseldorf premieres were given, including the orchestral cantata Macht hoch die Tür by Julius Weismann, the violin concerto op. 28 by Karl Goldmark and the choral work Von deutscher Seele by Hans Pfitzner. But Panzner was particularly attracted by premieres of contemporary Neue Musik, as he performed them together with Erich Kleiber as part of a complete concert series. Under his direction, the following works, among others, were premiered: the Symphonic Overture for Large Orchestra by Karl Horwitz, the Symphonic Fantasy for Piano and Orchestra by Alois Hába, the Symphony No. 5 G-Major by Ewald Straesser, the Sonata for piano and violin by Paul Pisk, the Lieder für Bariton by Wolfgang Bartesl, the opera Anneliese by Carl Ehrenberg, the Symphony No. 2 by Georg Gräner, the string quartets by Wilhelm Knöchel, the Sonatina for flute and piano by Philipp Jarnach, the Lieder für Bass by Sándor Jemnitz, the piano quintets, op. 21 (posthumous work) by Max Reger, the hymn Natur for four solos, mixed choir and large orchestra by Victor Merz, the choral and orchestral work Geister der Windstille by Rudolph Bergh and especially the 2nd Symphony op. 60 II. by Felix Woyrsch, which the latter had personally dedicated to him and which was performed triumphantly.

In addition, Panzner succeeded in attracting the soloists Edwin Fischer (piano), Elly Ney (piano), Walter Gieseking (piano), Eugène Ysaÿe (violin), Bronisław Huberman (violin) and Eugen d'Albert (piano).

Panzner died in Düsseldorf at the age of 57.

A street in Düsseldorf-Urdenbach was renamed Karl-Panzner-Weg in his honour.
