= Wolfgang Trommer =

German choral conductor

Wolfgang Trommer (10 July 1927 – 13 September 2018) was a German conductor and academic teacher.

== Training ==
Born in Wuppertal, Trommer attended the Musisches Gymnasium Frankfurt until the end of the war in 1945. He enjoyed a profound musical education at this school which, under the responsible direction of Kurt Thomas, looked after a large number of highly musical pupils, popularly known as "Musensöhne" (sons of the Muses), and gave them a broad and intensive basic musical knowledge. Many of the school graduates later went on to great careers, for example Alfred Koerppen, Helmut Kretschmar, Wolfgang Pasquay and Siegfried Strohbach. Some followed their teacher to the newly founded Northwest German Music Academy Detmold in 1946.

Trommer belonged to this circle of students. He first took conducting lessons with Günter Wand in Cologne before following Kurt Thomas to the Detmold Academy. There, in addition to piano, he studied choral conducting (with Kurt Thomas) and orchestral conducting (with Rolf Agop). In collaboration with Frederik Husler, the director of a Detmold master class for singing, Trommer built up an opera school in Husler's dependence in Steinhude am Meer. This activity provided him with a broad knowledge of the opera repertoire at an early stage.

In the summer of 1949, Trommer passed his academic matriculation examination in Detmold. His examination workload included the preparation and performance of a public concert with the Detmold Municipal Orchestra as well as rehearsals and performance of the Handel opera Acis and Galathea with soloists, choir and orchestra of the university.

== Theatre ==
Trommer worked for six years as Kapellmeister at the Dortmund Opera House from 1949. From 1955, he was 1st Kapellmeister at the Staatsoper Hannover for a further six years. During these twelve years, he developed and conducted an extensive opera repertoire.

In 1961, he moved to the Theater Aachen, where he was appointed Generalmusikdirektor in 1962, succeeding Hans Walter Kämpfel – at the theatre where Herbert von Karajan's rise had once begun and where, in the 1950s, Wolfgang Sawallisch conducted the Sinfonieorchester Aachen.

Trommer devoted himself to this task in Aachen for 12 years. In opera, he continuously built up an opera ensemble with young singers, some of whom achieved world fame. Each season he produced an opera of the modern classical repertoire together with the renowned director Hans Hartleb, among others Wozzeck, Lulu, Cardillac, Karl V. and Der junge Lord, which were enthusiastically received by the audience. Another focus was on operas by Mozart and Richard Strauss.

In addition to the great classical-romantic repertoire, the concert programme also included works of classical modernism as well as performances of younger composers. A major concern for him was the continuous work with the Municipal Choir, with which he regularly performed at the Eifel Music Festival in Steinfeld Abbey in addition to the concerts in Aachen. One focus of the programmes was on the works of Anton Bruckner.

== Lecturer and guest conductor ==
In 1974, Trommer decided to put his experience of 25 years in the theatre at the service of young talent and to work as a guest conductor with orchestras including the following: Berliner Symphoniker, Deutsches Symphonie-Orchester Berlin, Berliner Symphoniker, Munich Philharmonic, Bamberg Symphony, Württembergische Philharmonie Reutlingen, Orchestre Lamoureux Paris, Accademia Filarmonica Romana, Orchestra della RAI Roma, Orchestre National Opéra de Monte Carlo, Wiener Sinfonietta, Limburgs Symphonie Orkest, South African Broadcasting Corporation, Symphony Orchestra Johannesburg, Simón Bolívar Symphony Orchestra, Caracas. In addition to numerous television and radio productions at home and abroad, he has given guest opera performances in Hamburg, Stuttgart, Cologne, Düsseldorf, Rome, Monte Carlo, the Netherlands and Belgium.

In 1974, Trommer followed a call to the Robert Schumann Hochschule Düsseldorf and took over the conducting class there as professor, from which a large number of his students are now active in renowned opera houses and concert halls in Germany and abroad. He retired in 2001.

During his time in Aachen, Wolfgang Trommer was already head of the conducting, orchestra and opera class at the Maastricht Conservatory, where he worked for 20 years.

In 1980, Trommer founded the "Düsseldorfer Ensemble" for New Music. This instrumental ensemble was composed of the first wind players of the Düsseldorf Symphony Orchestra and outstanding young string players. Trommer's main concern was to offer young composers a podium. In his programmes, he liked to combine works of modern classical music (including the 7 Chamber Music Pieces by Paul Hindemith) with the premiere of a work by young composers. As early as the beginning of the 1980s, he conducted for the first time works by the Russian composers Sofia Gubaidulina, Alfred Schnittke and Edison Denisov, who were still unknown in Western Europe at the time and who are now among the best-known composers of our time. The "Düsseldorfer Ensemble" performed under his direction until 1999.

In connection with his university activities, Trommer trained the future music officers of the Bundeswehr from 1977 to 2001. He led the orchestra training of the Bundeswehr Training Music Corps until 2008. For his many years of successful work, he was awarded the Bundeswehr Cross of Honour in Gold in 2002.

In Germany, Trommer has been musical director of the "PlatinScala" since 2001. Especially for the artists of PlatinScala he also wrote the respective arrangements and conducted the concerts in Europe and overseas. He worked with young singers and instrumentalists who appreciate his many years of professional musical experience.

From 2010 to 2012, he served as music director at the Wailea Music Academy.

Since 1996, Trommer had been invited to Venezuela four times for conducting courses and orchestra concerts. He has personally taken part in the upswing that the musical life of this country has taken in recent years through the invaluable initiative of Dr. José Antonio Abreu. In the meantime, Trommer has conducted some of the most important orchestras in the country and has guided a large number of talented young conductors in courses. The greatest reward for him was the repeated wish of the young conductors and orchestra musicians to return to Venezuela soon and continue the collaboration with him. This intensive collaboration with the enthusiastic South American musicians was always a confirmation for Trommer of how important it is to be able to pass on experiences he has gained himself to young people.

Trommer died in Aachen at the age of 91.
