= Ewald Straesser =

German composer (1867–1933)

Ewald Straesser (Sträßer) (27 June 1867 – 4 April 1933) was a German composer.

Straesser was born in Burscheid, near Cologne. He was a student of Franz Wüllner at the Hochschule für Musik und Tanz Köln and later counted Georg von Albrecht among his own students, also Erwin Schulhoff (teaching him instrumentation/orchestration) At the Hochschule he succeeded Joseph Haas as professor of composition in 1921.

He died in 1933 in Stuttgart. Wilhelm Furtwängler, Hermann Abendroth and other conductors and ensembles featured works by Straesser in their concerts. The conductor Karl Panzner (1866–1923) championed Straesser's symphonies early on (and premiered his 5th symphony.)

Major works by Straesser include:

- 5 string quartets (Nos. 1 and 2, pub. 1901; no.3, pub.1913; no.4, published 1920; no.5, pub.1927)
- other chamber works (including a piano sonata (Kleine sonate), violin sonata, piano quintet, clarinet quintet and piano trio)
- 6 symphonies (at least 3 unpublished)
- concertos for piano, violin, and cello (1901, UK premiere 1903) (This last possibly lost. The piano concerto has been broadcast.)

There is an Ewald-Sträßer-Weg (Way/Street) in Burscheid.
