= Rudolf Pohl =

German Catholic prelate, musician, and choral conductor (1924–2021)

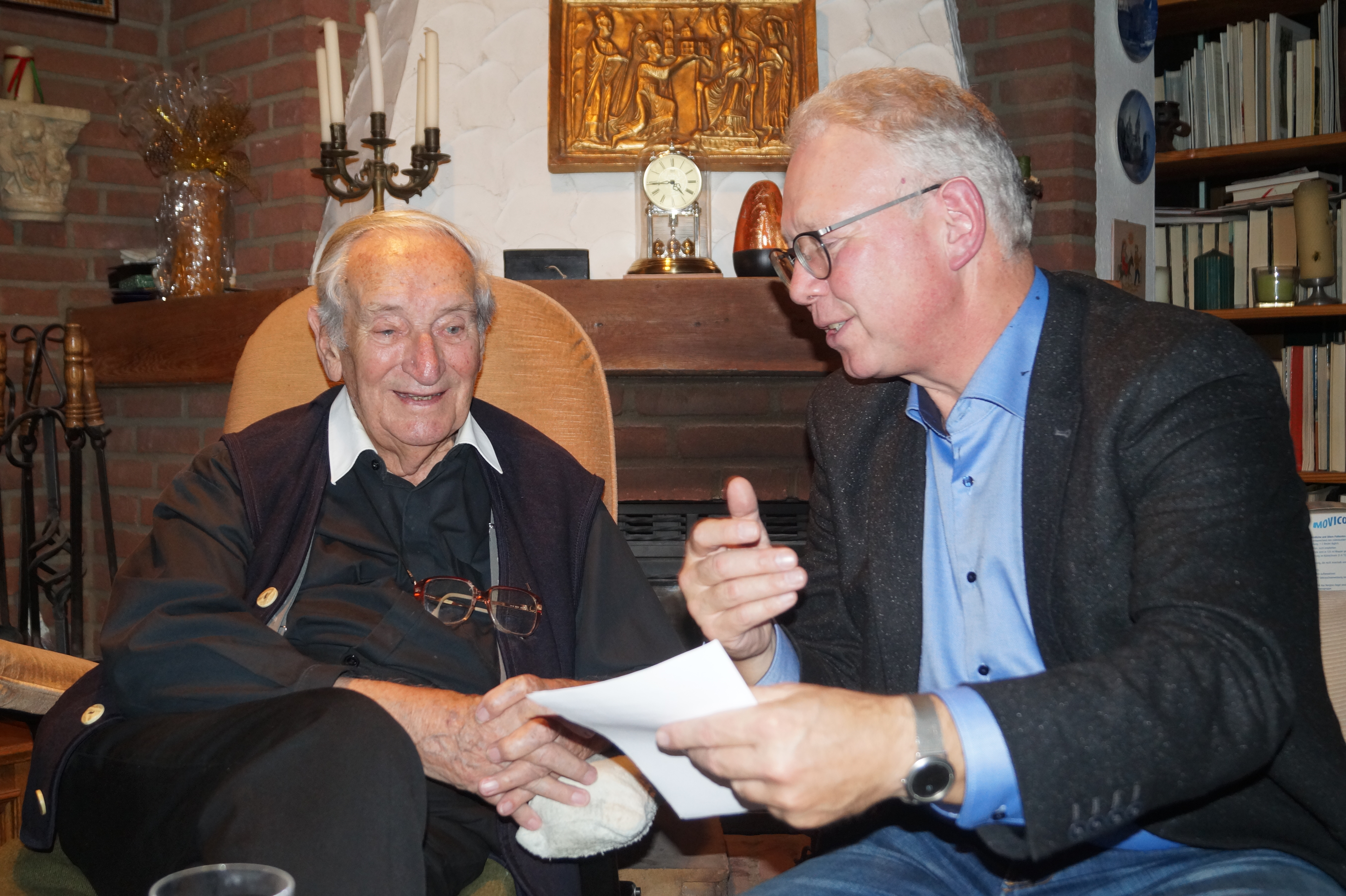
- Pohl (left) with Berthold Botzet in 2019
- Born: 5 November 1924; Aachen, Rhine Province, Prussia, Germany
- Died: 1 December 2021 (aged 97); Kelmis, Wallonia, Belgium
- Education: Priesterseminar Aachen, University of Bonn, Pädagogische Akademie
- Occupations: Prelate; Chorale conductor
- Organizations: Aachener Domchor
- Awards: Order of Merit of the Federal Republic of Germany

Rudolf Pohl (5 November 1924 – 1 December 2021) was a German Catholic prelate, musician, and choral conductor based at the Aachen Cathedral, where he led the Aachener Domchor to international recognition and revived a school for its boys' choir. He edited sacred music by Johannes Mangon, who had worked at the Cathedral in the 16th century.

== Life and career ==
Born in Aachen, Pohl attended the Kaiser-Karls-Gymnasium there. He was a member of the Aachener Domchor at the Aachen Cathedral from 1935 to 1942. After his Abitur he had to serve in the Wehrmacht and became a prisoner-of-war in Cherbourg. When he returned, he studied theology and philosophy at the universities of Paderborn, Frankfurt and Bonn, and at the Priesterseminar Aachen. He was consecrated as a priest in 1951, and worked as a chaplain in Krefeld. He continued his studies, now of musicology, at the University of Bonn from 1954 to 1959.

In 1954, Pohl was called to the Aachen Cathedral by Domkapellmeister Theodor Bernhard Rehmann. It was Pohl's objective to revive a boys' choir and founded the Aachener Domsingschule for their education. The tradition of a boys' choir at the cathedral dates back to the time of Charlemagne. A school was founded in 1960, which grew into a private Grundschule for boys.

Simultaneously, Pohl was promoted to the doctorate at the Bonn University, supervised by Josef Ratzinger. His dissertation dealt with the sacred choral music by Johannes Mangon who had worked at the Aachen Cathedral in the 16th century. Pohl would later edit his works and perform them. From 1960 to 1961, Pohl studied pedagogy at the Pädagogische Akademie in Aachen. He belonged to the team organising the 111. Niederrheinisches Musikfest in Aachen in 1957, along with Rehmann, Wolfgang Sawallisch, Wilhelm Pitz and others. After Rehmann's sudden death in 1963, Bishop Johannes Pohlschneider appointed him as director of the Aachener Domchor and Domkapellmeister. He improved the choir's quality, including the boys from the Domsingschule, leading them to international recognition by tours in Germany, Belgium, the Netherlands, Ireland, France, Italy, Poland, Czechoslovakia, Switzerland, Austria, England, Spain and Israel. Programs included masses, oratorios and Passions, also in recordings, and radio and television broadcasts of services from the cathedral.

In 1985, Pohl was rewarded for his merits in applying the changes of the Second Vatican Council; on the 8th International Congress of church music in Rome, he was elected president of the Consociatio Internationalis Musicae Sacrae (CIMS), a papal organisation for church music. A year later, he retired as Domkapellmeister, succeeded by Hans-Josef Roth.

Pohl initiated a foundation, the Rudolf-Pohl-Stiftung, for the instrumental education of the Domsingknaben, providing them with quality instruments.

Pohl died in Kelmis on 1 December 2021, at age 97.

== Publications ==
- Pohl, Rudolf (2010). Enchiridion – Musicae sacrae Musica sacra in den Zeugnisssen des Glaubens und der Kirche (in German). Aachen: Einhard. ISBN 978-3-936342-81-9. OCLC 700049694.

=== As editor ===
- Pohl, Rudolf (2014). Aachener Domsingknaben: Tagebuch und Bilderchronik, 1954–1986 (in German). Aachen: Edition Sinfonia Sacra e.V. ISBN 978-3-945289-02-0. OCLC 892336449.

Pohl edited works by Johannes Mangon, with comments and a transcription into modern practice:

- Mangon, Johannes (1998). Chorbuch II: Die Motetten (in German). Köln-Rodenkirchen: P.J. Tonger. ISBN 978-3-920950-14-3. OCLC 41918660.
- Mangon, Johannes (2000). Die Messen (in German). Aachen: Einhard. ISBN 978-3-930701-78-0. OCLC 174592614.
- Mangon, Johannes (2000). Chorbuch III: Antiphonen, Cantica, Hymnen, Varia (in German). Aachen: Einhard. ISBN 978-3-930701-84-1. OCLC 59717713.

== Recordings ==
- Josquin des Prez, Johann Joseph Fux, Tomás Luis de Victoria, Ave Maria Kaiserin music in Aachen cathedral. Rudolf Pohl, Aachener Domchor. Sony BMG music entertainment 2005 (Deutsche Harmonia mundi, 1972). OCLC 658463701

== Awards ==
- 2002 Order of Merit of the Federal Republic of Germany
