= Hermann Abendroth =

German conductor (1883–1956)

Hermann Abendroth

Hermann Paul Maximilian Abendroth (19 January 1883 – 29 May 1956) was a German conductor.

== Early life ==
Abendroth was born on 19 January 1883, at Frankfurt, the son of a bookseller. Several other members of the family were artists in diverse disciplines.

After finishing his school studies at the Frankfort Gymnasium, Abendroth traveled to Munich and at the wish of his father undertook the first year of an apprenticeship as a book dealer, but he then switched to studying music at the conservatory of Munich, the Münchner Konservatorium, from 1900 to 1903, studying theory and composition with Ludwig Thuille, piano with Anna Hirtzel-Langenham, and developing his conducting skills working with Felix Mottl.

== Initial career ==
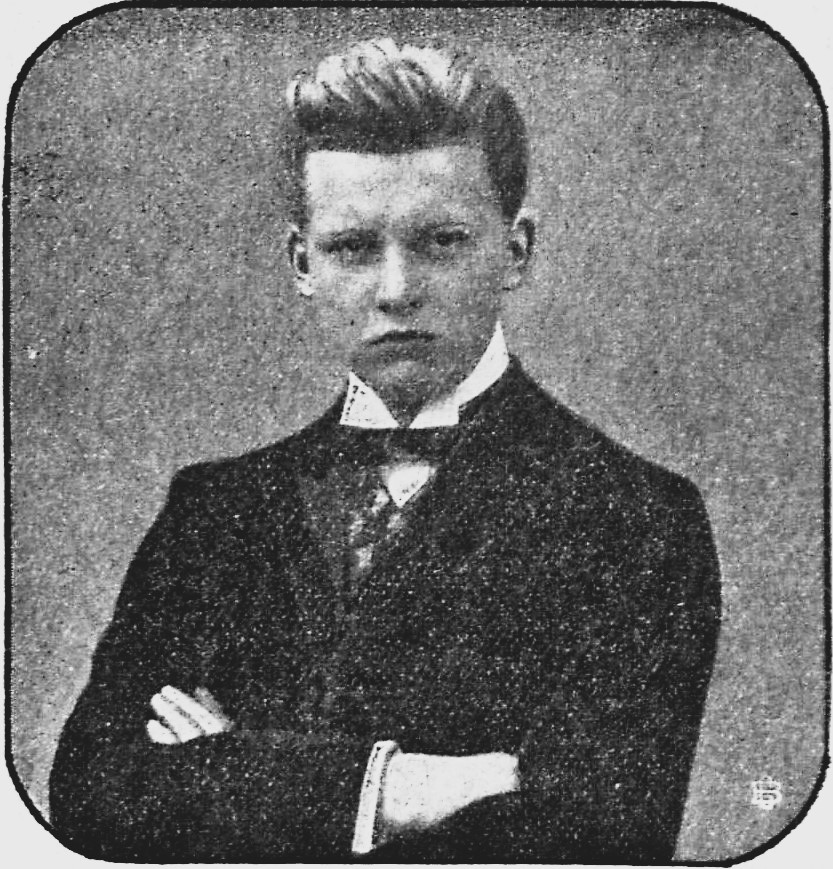
Hermann Abendroth

Still an undergraduate, Hermann Abendroth's first stable assignment of conducting was from 1903 to 1904, for the Orchestral Society of Munich. From 1905 to 1911, he moved to Lübeck, highlighting as the Kapellmeister of the Theater Lübeck. From 1911 to 1914, he was the Generalmusikdirektor (General music director) of the city of Essen.

From 1915 to 1934, he was the Kapellmeister of the Gürzenich Orchestra Cologne, and then also director of the Cologne Conservatory (1925–1934), which was reformed with his help, to become the Cologne Musikhochschule. He also became the general music director of Cologne in 1918, and was a professor in 1919. He also was the general music director of Bonn, from 1930 to 1933.

In 1922, Abendroth was the director of the Lower Rhenish Music Festival. He was invited to conduct in other countries as well, and visited the Soviet Union and conducted the USSR State Symphony Orchestra in 1925, 1927 and 1928. From 1926 to 1937, he visited England and regularly conducted the London Symphony Orchestra.

Abendroth is known for performing classical and romantic compositions, including Beethoven, Brahms, and Bruckner. He also conducted other contemporary pieces in their premieres, for instance for Bartok and Stravinsky.

== Nazi Germany ==
In 1934, the Nazi Party seized the city council of Cologne, and the liberally minded Abendroth was promptly removed from the public function and detained. Nonetheless, other personalities of the arts interceded, and Abendroth was restituted into the public function, to head the department of education of the Nazi Reichsmusikkammer. Accepting such charge, Abendroth was criticized for relinquishing his ideals. Nevertheless, he formally joined the Nazi Party in 1937.

In 1934, Hermann Abendroth was appointed Kapellmeister of the Gewandhausorchester Leipzig, replacing Bruno Walter, who was dismissed by the newly installed Nazi authorities because he refused the Nazi dictature and of being Jewish. From 1934 to 1945, Abendroth also was professor of the Leipzig conservatory (1941–1945 Leipzig Musikhochschule). In 1943 and 1944, he took part in the traditional Bayreuth Festival, conducting Die Meistersinger, its only opera for those two years. Adolf Hitler officialized and organized the festivity.

== East Germany ==
After World War II, the Communist new authorities of Saxony rescinded all Abendroth's contracts of Leipzig, and so - with his past of the Nazi Party - he wouldn't manage to get a new stable position anywhere else in Germany either. Abendroth then claimed that he had never attended any political meeting, and his fortune then would change at Thuringia, whose government appointed Abendroth for music director of Weimar from 1945 to 1956. In 1950 and 1954, Abendroth was elected the People's Chamber of the GDR for a four-year mandate ending in 1954 as a representative of the Cultural Association of the GDR.

Such opportunity would help cleansing Abendroth's name, about his Nazi past, and so he returned to Leipzig, in charge of its Radio Symphony Orchestra, from 1949 to 1956. As Abendroth, a heavy smoker, was becoming a prominent artist of East Germany, he was the only person allowed to smoke within the building of the radio station of Leipzig, by the Communist authorities.

Abendroth toured throughout the Communist Europe. He was the first German invited to conduct in the Soviet Union after the war, and also toured Finland and Switzerland. In 1951, he conducted for the Prague Spring International Music Festival. From 1953 to 1956, he conducted Berlin Radio Symphony Orchestra (East Berlin).

Ironically, such new celebrity status of Abendroth awoke suspicion about his new political affinity, and some locations of West Germany banned his presentations -such as in Düsseldorf- and the release of Abendroth's records on the Eterna label was quite limited in Western Europe.

== Death ==
Hermann Abendroth died of a stroke, during a surgical procedure, in Jena, on 29 May 1956. A state funeral was then granted for him.

== Records ==
Abendroth was amongst the first German music directors who released studio records regularly. His production spanned from mid-1920s, until his death.

Nowadays, Abendroth is being successfully rediscovered by a collection of CDs, published since mid-1990s, consisting mainly of his works for the Radio Symphony Orchestra of Leipzig of since 1953.

== Awards ==
- 1935 Commemorative Medal in gold of the Gesellschaft zur Beförderung gemeinnütziger Tätigkeit (Society for the Furtherance of Charitable Activities) of Lübeck (together with Wilhelm Furtwängler)
- 1937 Commander's Cross of the Order of St. Sava
- 1944 War Merit Cross, Second Class without swords
- 1946 Thuringian State: Certificate of appointment for the recognition of outstanding services to the revival of the artistic tradition of Weimar
- 1949 National Prize of East Germany for Arts and Letters, 2nd class
- 1952 Member of the Music Section of the German Academy of the Arts
- 1952 Honorary Member of the Mecklenburgische Staatskapelle, Schwerin
- 1953 Honorary citizen of the city of Weimar (on the occasion of his 70th birthday)
- 1953 Honorary Senator of the Friedrich Schiller University Jena, for his seventieth birthday
- 1954 Patriotic Order of Merit in Silver (East Germany)
- 19?? Honorary Member of the Professional Association German professional choir director
- Postage stamp with his likeness, in 1957, a year after his death

== Detail of career ==
=== Initial career ===
- Munich
  - 1900–1903: Munich Conservatory Münchner Konservatorium
  - 1903–1904: Munich Orchestral Society Münchner Orchesterverein
- Lübeck
  - 1905–1911: conducting for the Society of the Friends of Music, Vereins der Musikfreunde Lübeck
  - 1907–1911: Kapellmeister of the Theater Lübeck
  - 1910–1911: conducting the Philharmonischen Chor
- Essen
  - 1911–1914: Municipal Director of Music, städtischer Musikdirektor
- Cologne
  - 1915–1934: conducting the Gürzenich Orchestra
  - 1915–1925: he was Direktor of the Cologne Conservatory, Kölner Konservatorium
  - 1918: Städtischen Generalmusikdirektor of the city
  - 1919: Professor
  - 1925–1934: Director of Hochschule für Musik Köln, school of music of Cologne
- Touring
  - 1920: Mahler Festival of Amsterdam
  - 1922: Direktor of Lower Rhenish Music Festival
  - 1924: Łódź (Poland), conducting (October 1924) the Łódź Symphonic Orchestra
  - 1925,1927,1928: USSR, conducting the State Symphony Orchestra
  - 1926–1937: England, conducting the London Symphony Orchestra
- Bonn
  - 1930–1933: Generalmusikdirektor of city
- Berlin
  - 1909–1945: Berlin Philharmonic Orchestra, conducting it in eighty occasions.

=== Nazi Germany ===
- National offices
  - 1933–1945: Director of the Fachschaft Musikerzieher, choir director of the Reichsmusikkammer
  - 1938: Chief conductor at the Hessian State Theatre of Darmstadt
  - 1941: Chief Director of the Rhine-Mainische State Orchestra, at Frankfurt
  - 1943 & 1944: conducting the Bayreuth Festival
- Leipzig
  - 1934–1945: Kapellmeister of the Gewandhausorchester Leipzig
  - 1934–1945: Professor of the conservatory, Landeskonservatorium der Musik zu Leipzig
  - 1941: Professor of the Musikhochschule

=== Communist Germany ===
- Thuringia
  - 1945–1956: Music director of Weimar
  - 1945–1956: conducting the Staatskapelle
  - 1946: he became a regional Staatsrat
  - curator, of the Liszt Museum of Weimar.
- Leipzig
  - 1949–1956: conducting the Radio Symphony Orchestra, Rundfunk-Sinfonie-Orchester
- East Berlin
  - 1953–1956: conducting the Radio Symphony Orchestra of Berlin
- Touring
  - 1951: Prague Spring International Music Festival
  - 1951: USSR
  - 1954: USSR, conducting the State Symphony Orchestra

Preceded by Fritz Steinbach	Kapellmeister, Gürzenich Orchestra Cologne; 1915–1934	Succeeded by Eugen Papst
