= Lower Rhenish Music Festival =

The Lower Rhenish Music Festival (German: Das Niederrheinische Musikfest) was one of the most important festivals of classical music, which happened every year between 1818 and 1958, with few exceptions, at Pentecost for 112 times.

== History ==
In the year 1817 Johann Schornstein, the musical director at Elberfeld, organized a music festival in his town, in which he was assisted by the musicians from Düsseldorf under their conductor Friedrich August Burgmüller. During this festival the idea was born by Schornstein and Burgmüller to repeat this event every year alternately between their cities. In the year 1821 the musicians from Cologne and 1825 from Aachen participated, but with the performance 1827 the responsible persons of Elberfeld decided to stop their commitment, because the town was not up to manage the rush of musicians and guests. This festival continued up to 1958 and took place 112 times. Only during the period of the Revolutions of 1848 in the German states and the First and Second World War the meeting was interrupted. After the last war in the year 1948 Cologne resigned out of this cycle of the music festival, whereas the cities Wuppertal, a fusion of Elberfeld and Barmen, and Duisburg acceded to this meeting. But in the year 1958 the festival was closed definitely, because in the meantime some other regional music festivals were founded.

At the beginning the Lower Rhenish Music Festival continued two days and from the year 1826 one day more, every year during Whitsuntide. Temporary in 1834 the king Frederick William III of Prussia interdicted this performance on Whitsun for religious reasons, but by the intercession of his nephew prince Frederick of Prussia, an art enthusiast and protector of the art societies of Düsseldorf, the festival regained permission with some restrictions.

== Characteristics ==
From the beginning the Lower Rhenish Music Festival apprehended as a societal and cultural culmination on a highly artistically level. To the home and foreign guests, politicians, business people and members of the high nobility there were presented all the compositions, which played a significant role at that time. In addition to the local music directors many important conductors, composers and soloists were engaged as director of the festivals. Again and again the stage was used for the performance of world and national premieres and also for the presentation of new versions by known or unknown artists. The focus comprised the music of the last epochs of the Baroque music, the Viennese classical as well as the Romantic Music and later of the 20th-century classical music. There were performed the great symphonic poems, mass, oratorios, chorale, cantatas and here and there chamber music.

This implicated that sometimes the participation of more than 500 musicians. On one side the high number of musicians and the foreign guests connoted a lucrative revenue stream but on the other side also a logistical challenge and risk for the organization.

== Chronology ==
The table lists the chronology of the Lower Rhenish Music Festival, compiled from a selection of reliable sources.

serial number	year	place	Directors of festival	specifics/premiere/significant soloists (selection)
0	1817	Elberfeld	Johannes Schornstein	Officially it doesn't ranking to this cycle, but it believes as an initial spark;
1	1818	Düsseldorf	Friedrich August Burgmüller	Top priority: The Seasons and Schöpfungsmesse of Joseph Haydn; Soloist: Johannes Schornstein (piano)
2	1819	Elberfeld	Johann Schornstein	
3	1820	Düsseldorf	Friedrich August Burgmüller	German premiere of the oratorio "Samson" of George Frideric Handel; Soloist: Johannes Schornstein (piano)
4	1821	Cologne	Friedrich August Burgmüller,	The city of Cologne new in the programme; inter alia promote through Erich Verkenius, president of the Cologne University of Music
5	1822	Düsseldorf	Friedrich August Burgmüller	world premiere of the oratorio "Das befreite Jerusalem" of Abbé Maximilian Stadler; For logistic reasons Düsseldorf deputized for Elberfeld. At first-time in the hall of knights of the old castle of Düsseldorf.
6	1823	Elberfeld	Johannes Schornstein	
7	1824	Cologne	Friedrich Schneider	World premiere of the oratorio "Die Sündflut" of Friedrich Schneider
8	1825	Aachen	Ferdinand Ries	City of Aachen new in the programme; German premiere of the Symphony No.9 of Ludwig van Beethoven in celebration of opening of Theater Aachen
9	1826	Düsseldorf	Louis Spohr and Ferdinand Ries	Düsseldorf premiere of the oratorio "The Last Judgement" of Louis Spohr (Text: Johann Friedrich Rochlitz) and the Symphony Nr. 6 D major op. 146 of F. Ries; First-time the festival takes over three days.
10	1827	Elberfeld	Johann Schornstein and Erich Verkenius	Last participation of the City of Elberfeld;
11	1828	Cologne	Bernhard Klein, Ferdinand Ries and Carl Leibl	World premiere of the oratorio "Jephtha" of B. Klein and a new recording concert overture at "Don Carlos" of F. Ries
12	1829	Aachen	Ferdinand Ries	
13	1830	Düsseldorf	Ferdinand Ries	German premiere of the overture "Braut von Messina" op. 162 of F. Ries, (Text: Friedrich Schiller), also Düsseldorf premiere of the oratorio "Judas Maccabaeus" of G. F. Handel
14	1832	Cologne	Ferdinand Ries	
15	1833	Düsseldorf	Felix Mendelssohn	German premiere of Symphony No. 4 (The Italian) and a "festival-overture" of F. Mendelssohn, also the oratorio Israel in Egypt in the German original version of G. F. Handel; new in the programme: morning concerts
16	1834	Aachen	Ferdinand Ries	Soloist: Frédéric Chopin (piano)
17	1835	Cologne	Felix Mendelssohn	Solomon of G. F. Handel in original score and with comp of organ; Choir master: Fanny Mendelssohn
18	1836	Düsseldorf	Felix Mendelssohn	World premiere of the oratorio "St. Paul" of F. Mendelssohn; Choir master: J. Schornstein
19	1837	Aachen	Ferdinand Ries	World premiere of the oratorio "Die Könige in Israel" of Ferdinand Ries
20	1838	Cologne	Felix Mendelssohn	
21	1839	Düsseldorf	Felix Mendelssohn	Guest appearance and successfully artistic breakthrough of the composer Hubert Ferdinand Kufferath; world premiere of a festival-overture of Julius Rietz; Choir master: J. Schornstein
22	1840	Aachen	Louis Spohr	
23	1841	Cologne	Conradin Kreutzer	
24	1842	Düsseldorf	Felix Mendelssohn	
25	1843	Aachen	Carl Gottlieb Reissiger	
26	1844	Cologne	Heinrich Dorn	German premiere of Missa Solemnis D major op. 123 of L. v. Beethoven
27	1845	Düsseldorf	Julius Rietz	German premiere of the "Requiem" of Wolfgang Amadeus Mozart; Nine years pause follows because the Revolutions of 1848 in the German states
28	1846	Aachen	Felix Mendelssohn	Soloist and discovery of the "Swedish Nightingale" Jenny Lind (soprano)
29	1847	Cologne	Heinrich Dorn, Gaspare Spontini and George Onslow	German premiere of the Symphony No. 4 G major op. 71 of G. Onslow
30	1851	Aachen	Peter Josef von Lindpaintner	
31	1853	Düsseldorf	Robert Schumann, Ferdinand Hiller and Julius Tausch	World premiere of the Symphony No. 4 d-minor op. 120 and the festival-overture Op. 123 of R. Schumann; Soloist: Clara Schumann (piano) and Joseph Joachim (violin);
32	1854	Aachen	Peter Joseph von Lindpaintner	
33	1855	Düsseldorf	Ferdinand Hiller	Special performance of the oratorio "Paradise and the Peri" by R. Schumann by special request of the soloist Jenny Lind (soprano)
34	1856	Düsseldorf	Julius Rietz	Düsseldorf provided an alternative venue at short notice because the Cologne concert hall, the "Gürzenich," had to be restored and rebuilt.
35	1857	Aachen	Franz Liszt	
36	1858	Cologne	Ferdinand Hiller	World premiere of the oratorio "Saul" of Ferdinand Hiller
37	1860	Düsseldorf	Ferdinand Hiller	Soloist: Joseph Joachim (violin)
38	1861	Aachen	Franz Lachner	Soloist: Clara Schumann (piano)
39	1862	Cologne	Ferdinand Hiller	
40	1863	Düsseldorf	Otto Goldschmidt and Julius Tausch	Soloist: Jenny Lind (soprano)
41	1864	Aachen	Julius Rietz and Franz Wüllner	First-time in the new "Redoute", the ballroom of the old casino in Aachen; Application of a new organ by organ building company "Ibach"
42	1865	Cologne	Ferdinand Hiller	Soloist: Friedrich Nietzsche as singer
43	1866	Düsseldorf	Otto Goldschmidt and Julius Tausch	World premiere of the Violin Concerto No.1 g-minor, op. 26, of Max Bruch; Soloists: Clara Schumann (piano), Joseph Joachim (violin) and Jenny Lind (soprano); Inauguration ceremony of the new concert hall Tonhalle Düsseldorf
44	1867	Aachen	Julius Rietz and Ferdinand Breunung	
45	1868	Cologne	Ferdinand Hiller	
46	1869	Düsseldorf	Julius Rietz and Julius Tausch	Soloist: Joseph Joachim (violin)
47	1870	Aachen	Franz Lachner and Ferdinand Breunung	last performance of Jenny Lind with the soprano-solo of the oratorio "Ruth" of Otto Goldschmidt
48	1871	Cologne	Ferdinand Hiller	
49	1872	Düsseldorf	Anton Rubinstein and Julius Tausch	World premiere of the religious opera "Der Turm zu Babel" of A. Rubinstein
50	1873	Aachen	Julius Rietz and Ferdinand Breunung	Soloists: Marie Wilt (soprano), Johann Christoph Lauterbach (violin) and Clara Schumann (piano)
51	1874	Cologne	Ferdinand Hiller	
52	1875	Düsseldorf	Joseph Joachim and Julius Tausch	Düsseldorf premiere of the Missa Solemnis of L. v. Beethoven
53	1876	Aachen	Ferdinand Breunung	Inauguration of a new organ by Georg Stahlhuth; Soloist and artistic breakthrough of Adolf Wallnöfer (Tenor)
54	1877	Cologne	Ferdinand Hiller	guest appearance as conductor of Giuseppe Verdi with his Messa da Requiem
55	1878	Düsseldorf	Joseph Joachim and Julius Tausch	World premiere of the choir-performance "Germanenzug" of Julius Tausch; Artistic breakthrough of the Symphony No. 2 of Johannes Brahms; Düsseldorf premiere of "Szenen aus Goethes Faust" of R. Schumann; Soloist: Clara Schumann (piano)
56	1879	Aachen	Ferdinand Breunung and Max Bruch	
57	1880	Cologne	Ferdinand Hiller	Soloist: Clara Schumann (piano)
58	1881	Düsseldorf	Niels Gade and Julius Tausch	Soloist: Eugen Gura (baritone)
59	1882	Aachen	Franz Wüllner	
60	1883	Cologne	Ferdinand Hiller	
61	1884	Düsseldorf	Johannes Brahms and Julius Tausch	Soloist: Eugen d'Albert (piano)
62	1885	Aachen	Julius Kniese and Carl Reinecke	
63	1886	Cologne	Franz Wüllner	
64	1887	Düsseldorf	Hans Richter and Julius Tausch	Soloist: Eugen d'Albert (piano)
65	1888	Aachen	Hans Richter and Eberhard Schwickerath	
66	1889	Cologne	Franz Wüllner	
67	1890	Düsseldorf	Hans Richter and Julius Buths	Soloist: Bernhard Stavenhagen (piano)
68	1891	Aachen	Ernst von Schuch and Eberhard Schwickerath	
69	1892	Cologne	Franz Wüllner	
70	1893	Düsseldorf	Julius Buths	
71	1894	Aachen	Ernst von Schuch and Eberhard Schwickerath	
72	1895	Cologne	Franz Wüllner	
73	1896	Düsseldorf	Johannes Brahms, Julius Buths and Richard Strauss	last performance of J. Brahms in Rhineland; Soloists: Pablo de Sarasate (violin) and Ferruccio Busoni (piano)
74	1897	Aachen	Hans Richter and Eberhard Schwickerath	
75	1898	Cologne	Franz Wüllner	
76	1899	Düsseldorf	Richard Strauss and Julius Buths	
77	1900	Aachen	Richard Strauss and Eberhardt Schwickerath	
78	1901	Cologne	Karl Wolff and Erich Urban	
79	1902	Düsseldorf	Richard Strauss and Julius Buths	The meeting was incorporate under the programme of the Düsseldorf industrial exhibition; second German performance also breakthrough of the oratorio The Dream of Gerontius of Edward Elgar.
80	1903	Aachen	Felix Weingartner and Eberhard Schwickerath	Soloist: George Enescu (violin)
81	1904	Cologne	Fritz Steinbach	
82	1905	Düsseldorf	Julius Buths	Soloists: Ernő Dohnányi (piano), Irene Abendroth (soprano)
83	1906	Aachen	Felix Weingärtner and Eberhard Schwickerath	
84	1907	Cologne	Fritz Steinbach	
85	1909	Aachen	Max von Schillings, Eberhard Schwickerath and Richard Strauss	
86	1910	Cologne	Fritz Steinbach	
87	1911	Düsseldorf	Karl Panzner	Soloist: Eugène Ysaÿe (violin)
88	1912	Aachen	Karl Muck and Eberhard Schwickerath	
89	1913	Cologne	Fritz Steinbach	Cologne premiere of the Symphony No. 8 of Gustav Mahler
90	1914	Düsseldorf	Karl Panzner	Soloists: Elly Ney (piano), Bronislaw Huberman (violin)
91	1920	Aachen	Karl Muck and Eberhard Schwickerath	
92	1922	Cologne	Hermann Abendroth	Cologne premiere of the romantic cantata "Von deutscher Seele" of Hans Pfitzner
93	1924	Aachen	Peter Raabe and Walter Braunfels	
94	1925	Cologne	Hermann Abendroth and Richard Strauss	integrate under the programme of the "millennium-festival of the Rhineland"
95	1926	Düsseldorf	Hans Weisbach	German premiere of the dramatic and symphonic Psalm "Le Roi David" of Arthur Honegger; Soloist: Ludwig Wüllner (reciter), Edwin Fischer (piano)
96	1927	Aachen	Peter Raabe and Walter Braunfels	
97	1928	Cologne		
98	1929	Düsseldorf	Hans Weisbach	World premiere of "Marianischen Antiphone" of Wolfgang Fortner also the chamber concert op. 43 a of Adolf Busch and the Sonata for flutes, 2 Viola da gamba and Basso continuo according to a scripture in the state library of Hesse of Georg Philipp Telemann
99	1930	Aachen	Peter Raabe and Paul Pella	Highlight: Wozzeck of Alban Berg
100	1933	Aachen		Gottlob Karl Springsfeld, Aachen fabricant and one of the Aachen sponsors of the music festivals has died
101	1946	Aachen	Theodor Bernhard Rehmann, Heinrich Hollreiser, Günter Wand, Wilhelm Pitz and Felix Raabe	Remake after the pause because the world war; Top priority was English (Edward Elgar and Ralph Vaughan Williams) aöso French works (César Franck and Maurice Ravel)
102	1947	Düsseldorf	Heinrich Hollreiser	German premiere of the symphonic metamorphosis about a theme of Carl Maria von Weber aon Paul Hindemith
103	1948	Cologne		
104	1949	Aachen	Felix Raabe, Theodor Bernhard Rehmann, Hans Weisbach, Michael Sittard	World premiere of the symphonic cantata "Zwischen Zeit und Ewigkeit" op. 65 of Franz Philipp also the "Variations for Orchestra" of Ernst Pepping
105	1950	Wuppertal		
106	1951	Düsseldorf	Heinrich Hollreiser	Düsseldorf premiere of the oratorio "Das Unaufhörliche" of Paul Hindemith
107	1952	Aachen	Felix Raabe, Heinrich Hollreiser, Theodor Bernhard Rehmann, Günther Wand and Hans Weisbach	world premiere of the symphonic intermezzo from the lyric drama "Boulevard Solitude" of Hans Werner Henze
108	1954	Duisburg	Georg Ludwig Jochum	World premiere of the choral "Wiegenlied der Mutter Gottes" of H. W. Henze, Text: Lope de Vega
109	1955	Wuppertal	Paul Hindemith	World premiere of the cantata "Ite angeli veloces" of P. Hindemith, Text: Paul Claudel
110	1956	Düsseldorf	Hermann Scherchen	World premiere of the choral "Tedeum" of Ernst Pepping also of the concert for piano and orchestra of Hans Vogt
111	1957	Aachen	Wolfgang Sawallisch, Theodor Bernhard Rehmann, Rudolf Pohl, Wilhelm Pitz, Leo Nießen and Karl Venth	Representation of the composer Wolfgang Meyer-Tormin
112	1958	Duisburg	Georg Ludwig Jochum	last performance of the Lower Rhenish Music Festivals

== Literature (selection) ==
- Literaturverzeichnis der Rheinischen Musikfeste in der Bibliothek des Beethovenhauses Bonn: Beethoven-Haus Bonn / literature, sheet music, audiovisual media - Short entries of query results
- Lutz Felbick: Daten der Aachener Musikgeschichte: Chronologie und Bibliographie, Stadt Aachen 1993 (html)
- Alf, Julius: Geschichte und Bedeutung der Niederrheinischen Musikfeste in der ersten Hälfte des 19. Jh.; Nachdruck aus: Düsseldorfer Jahrbuch. 42. 1940 und 43. 1941. Düsseldorf, 1978, ISBN 3-7700-0737-9
- Dohm, Rudolf: Aachens Beitrag zur Musikgeschichte; in 105. Niederrheinisches Musikfest 1950 in Wuppertal. S. 31–45.
- Programme sämtlicher in Aachen abgehaltener (Niederrheinischer) Musikfeste (von 1825 - 1879). in: Aachener Calender für das Jahr 1880. S. 107–119. und in: Musik, Theater und Kunst im Jahre 1878/79. S. 97–101.
- Sietz, Reinhold: Das 35. Rheinische Musikfest 1857 unter dem Dirigenten Franz Liszt; in: Zeitschrift des Aachener Geschichtsverein (ZAGV). 69. 1957. S. 79–110.
- Sietz, Reinhold: Das Niederrheinische Musikfest 1834 zu Aachen; in: ZAGV. 70. 1958. S. 167–191.
- Sietz, Reinhold: Die Niederrheinischen Musikfeste in Aachen in der ersten Hälfte des 19. Jh.; in: ZAGV. 72. 1960. p. 109-164.
- Julius Alf: Das Niederrheinische Musikfest in Wuppertal. "Moderne Musik" in Geschichte und Gegenwart; in: Beiträge zur Rheinischen Musikgeschichte, Köln/Krefeld 005, 1952
- Klaus Wolfgang Niemöller: Felix Mendelssohn Bartholdy und das Niederrheinische Musikfest 1835 in Köln; in: Beiträge zur Rheinischen Musikgeschichte, Köln/Krefeld 0625, 1952
- Ursula Eckart-Bäcker: Friedrich Nietzsche als Sänger in Köln. Berichte über das 42. Niederrheinische Musikfest 1865; in: Beiträge zur Rheinischen Musikgeschichte, Köln/Krefeld 062, 1952
- Julius Alf: Das Niederrheinische Musikfest nach 1945. Ausklang einer Jahrhundert-Tradition, in: Düsseldorfer Jahrbuch 57/58, 1980, S. 472–497
- Willibald Gurlitt: Robert Schumann und die Romantik in der Musik, 106. Niederrheinisches Musikfest in Düsseldorf, Jahrbuch 1951, S. 13–52. - Nachdruck 1966

== Websites ==
- DNB, Katalog der Deutschen Nationalbibliothek
- Heimatverein Düsseldorfer Jonges e. V.
- https://web.archive.org/web/20110719085302/http://www.staedtischermusikvereinduesseldorf.de/lebenslauf/lebenslauf_druck.php
- Allgemeine musikalische Zeitung – Wikisource
