= Christopher Ward (conductor) =

British conductor (born 1980)

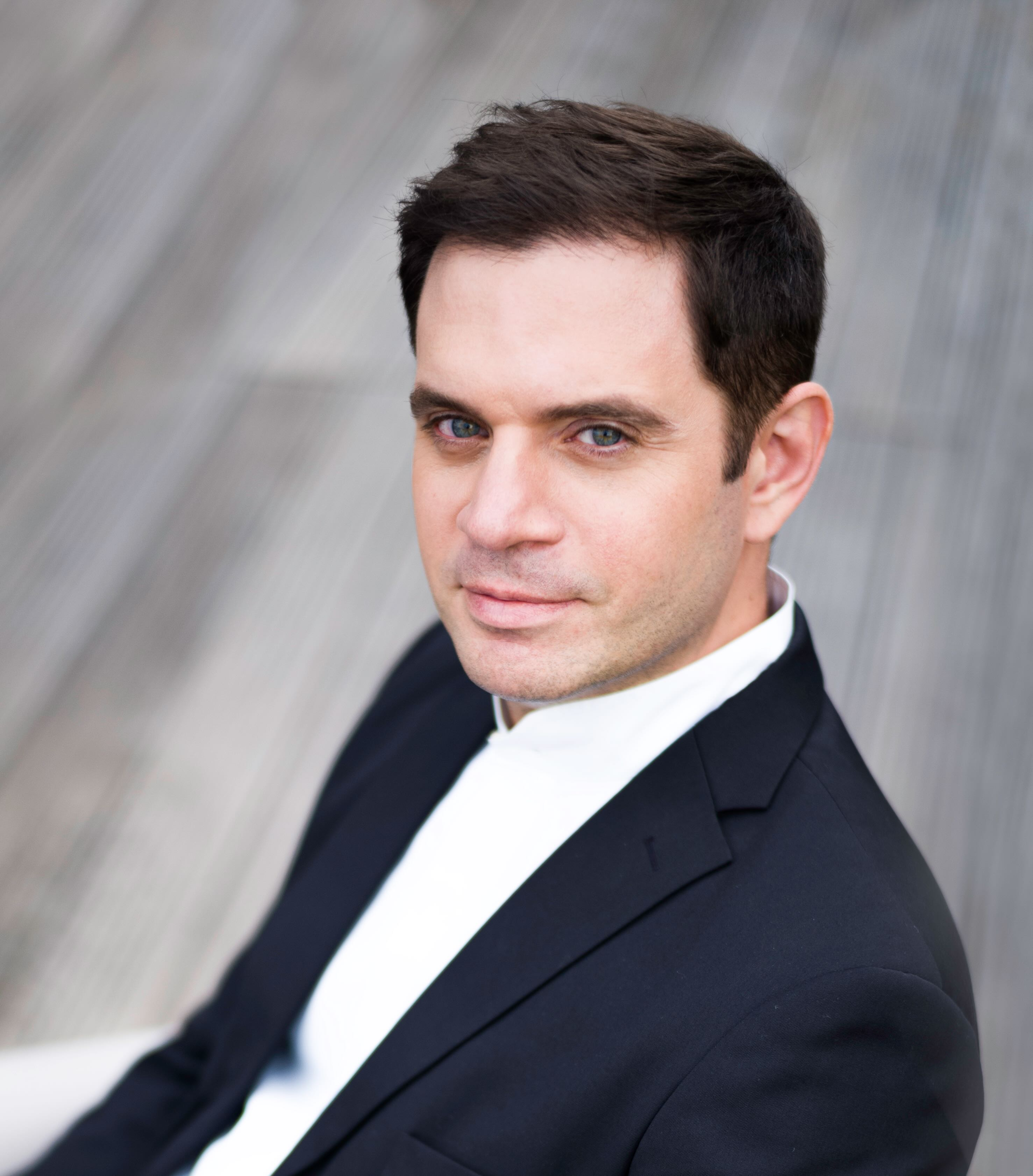
Christopher Ward

Christopher Ward (born 18 March 1980) is a British conductor who has spent most of his career working in Germany. He was music director of Theater Aachen from 2018 to 2026. .

== Career ==
Christopher Ward studied at Tonbridge School, Oxford University and the Guildhall School of Music and Drama, London.. During this time, he worked with Oxford University Philharmonia and Chorus, Oxford Bach Choir and New Chamber Opera. In 2003, he was awarded the position of Répétiteur Fellow at Scottish Opera and the RSAMD, Glasgow.

In 2004, he spent a period working at the Internationales Opernstudio at Zürich Opera before moving to Germany in 2005 to work as Solorepetitor and Kapellmeister at Staatstheater Kassel. Working as music staff on a broad repertoire, he led several new productions, and conducted the Staatsorchester Kassel in a range of concerts as well as directing the theatre’s annual youth orchestra project (TJO). In 2006, he assisted Simon Rattle and the Berlin Philharmonic in a production of Wagner’s Das Rheingold at the Aix-en-Provence Festival, and continued this association in Berlin and Salzburg Easter Festival 2007).

Ward was appointed Kapellmeister and Assistant to Kent Nagano at the Bavarian State Opera in 2009. He led new productions of Rossini’s La Cenerentola, Haydn’s La fedeltà premiata and Janacek’s The Cunning Little Vixen, and world premieres of Eötvös' Die Tragödie des Teufels, Lucia Ronchetti’s Narrenschiffe and Miroslav Srnka`s Make No Noise, which opened the 2012 Munich Opera Festival with Ensemble Modern as the pit orchestra. He has conducted concerts with the Bayerisches Staatsorchester, and Orchesterakademie, and the Opera Studios of Munich and La Scala, Milan.

In 2014, he became 1. Kapellmeister at the Saarländisches Staatstheater. Here he conducted new productions of Weber’s Der Freischütz, Verdi’s Simon Boccanegra, Rigoletto, and Nabucco, Dvořák’s Rusalka, Ravel’s L'enfant et les sortilèges and Daphnis et Chloé, Rimsky-Korsakov’s The Golden Cockerel, Rameau’s Platée, Michael Obst's Solaris and Georg Friedrich Haas’ Bluthaus, as well as a number of revivals, ballets and symphonic concerts.

As a guest conductor, Christopher Ward has directed performances of opera at the Staatsoper Hamburg, Deutsche Oper am Rhein, Komische Oper, Oper Graz, Salzburger Landestheater, Staatsoper Prague, National Theater Prague, Slovak National Theatre, Staatstheater Braunschweig, Staatstheater Mainz, Staatstheater Darmstadt and Theater Bremen. He has conducted concerts with orchestras including Staatskapelle Halle, Bremer Philharmoniker, Staatsorchester Braunschweig, Oldenburgisches Staatsorchester and the Orchestra of Welsh National Opera.. He has conducted world premieres at Prague Spring International Music Festival and Bregenz Summer Festival, and in 2019 took over at short notice the world premiere of Jörg Widmann’s Babylon for an indisposed Daniel Barenboim at the Staatsoper Unter den Linden, Berlin.

With labels Naxos and Capriccio, he has made recordings collaborating with the Berlin Radio Symphony Orchestra, Gürzenich Orchestra Köln, ORF Symphony Orchestra, Deutsche Staatsphilharmonie Rheinland-Pfalz and Sinfonieorchester Aachen, some of which have received Opus Klassik nominations.

Ward was Generalmusikdirektor of Theater Aachen from 2018 to 2026, where his productions and concerts included Berg's Wozzeck, Verdi's La Forza del Destino, Bizet's Carmen, Purcell's King Arthur and Puccini's La bohème, appearing regularly with Sinfonieorchester Aachen at the Kölner Philharmonie and Amsterdam Concertgebouw. Alongside maintaining a focus on contemporary music, he developed a baroque ensemble from within the orchestra that plays on period instruments. He has made world premiere recordings of the music of Leo Blech, and led recording projects with Deutschlandfunk Kultur and WDR. Ward has appeared with the orchestra in two feature length films, including Fatih Akin’s Rheingold.. Ward concluded his role at Theater Aachen at the end of the 2025-26 season.

Christopher Ward has been appointed Music Director of Longborough Festival Opera, succeeding Anthony Negus from the 2027 season when Negus becomes Conductor Laureate.
