= Stefan Lano =

- Born: 1952 (age 73–74); Worcester, Massachusetts, United States
- Education: Oberlin College, Harvard University
- Occupation: Composer

Stefan Lano (born 1952) is a composer and music director, currently serving as the music and artistic director of the National Symphony Orchestra of Uruguay. He previously served an extensive career with the Vienna State Opera.

== Early life and education ==
Lano was born in Worcester, Massachusetts in 1952 and is of Albanian descent. He attended Worcester Academy, graduating in 1970. He studied Biology and Composition at Oberlin College and Oberlin Conservatory of Music before attending Harvard University on a full fellowship, where he gained a PhD in Musical Composition.

The 1976 premier of his Sinfonie N° 1 afforded him his initial experience in the symphonic genre, both as composer and conductor at the Newport Music Festival.

During his time in Berlin, he continued piano studies as well as conducting under Professor Hans Martin Rabenstein. It was during this period that he composed his Sinfonie N° 2 (Grodek) before assuming a position as pianist at the opera house in Graz, Austria.

== Symphony career ==
In 1982, he worked under Lorin Maazel as répétiteur at the Vienna State Opera, a position which he held until his appointment by Maazel as Associate Conductor of the Pittsburgh Symphony from 1988 to 1991.

He returned to Europe as music director at the Aachen Opera where he later served as Music Director and director of studies. His international engagements began during these years with concert and opera performance at major musical centers in Europe, South America and Japan.

For the first South American performances of the three-act version of Alban Berg's Lulu, Lano worked to inaugurate the 1993 season at the Teatro Colón in Buenos Aires, Argentina. This led to his serving as its Music Director from 2005 to 2008.

=== Conducting debut ===
Lano made his conducting debut at the Met in 1997 conducting Igor Stravinsky's The Rakes Progress. This led to engagements at the San Francisco Opera, again for Lulu in 1998 and Douglas Moore's The Ballad of Baby Doe in 2000.

In 2002, he conducted a concert-performance with the Montréal Symphony of Alban Berg's Wozzeck which was cited as "Best Concert of the Season" by the Conseil québécois de la musique. In 2003, he and the orchestra again received this acclaim for their performance of Béla Bartók's Bluebeard's Castle.

In recent years, his career has been centered primarily in Europe and South America with regular engagements at the Semper Oper Dresden, Hamburg State Opera and Lithuanian National Philharmonic, where he conducted the first performance of his Sinfonie N° 3 in 2004. He has also been a regular at the National Opera of Slovakia in Bratislava and the Teatro Colón.

=== Awards ===
- BMI Award
- First Prize, National Society of Arts and Letters Composition Competition
- American Music Center Grant
- German Academic Exchange Service (DAAD) Fellowship for study with Isang Yun in Berlin (1977)
