= Georg Gräner =

German composer and music critic (b. 1876, d. 1945)

Georg Gräner (20 November 1876 – 30 April 1945) was a German composer and music critic.

== Life ==
Born in Berlin, Gräner studied composition and horn. From 1899 until 1906, he was a performing musician and music correspondent of the Vossische Zeitung in London, then until 1914 he worked as a music consultant. In 1920, he joined the Deutsche Musiker-Zeitung, which closed in 1933. From 1930 until his death, he taught harmony and piano at the Stern Conservatory (1936 renamed to Conservatory of the Reich Capital Berlin).

As a composer, Gräner stood in the tradition of Anton Bruckner. As a journalist he was one of the first to promote Max Reger's works. He also became known with a biography about his cousin Paul Graener, published in 1922, which he had written without his knowledge. Paul Graener was dissatisfied with this; nevertheless the two worked together in the following period: Georg Gräner wrote the libretto to Paul Graener's opera Hanneles Himmelfahrt (1927), after the eponymous play by Gerhart Hauptmann.

Like his cousin, Gräner also turned to Nazism and wrote propagandistic articles such as Deutsche und undeutsche Musik.

Gräner died in Potsdam aged 68.

== Work ==
=== Compositions ===
- 12 Christmas carols for voice and piano (or string quartet)
- Das kommende Reich, symphony for solos, mixed choir, orchestra and organ
- Symphony No. 1 in one movement Resurrection
- Symphony No. 2 in one movement Sinfonia patetica
- Symphony No. 3
- Ibsengesänge for baritone and small orchestra
- Legende for chamber orchestra
- Variationen for large orchestra

=== Libretto ===
- Hanneles Himmelfahrt. Two-act opera (after the play of the same name by Gerhart Hauptmann). Music: Paul Graener. Premiered 17 February 1927 in Dresden Semperoper
