= Piano Concerto (Delius) =

Early composition by Frederick Delius

Delius in 1907

The Piano Concerto in C minor is one of the early compositions by the English composer Frederick Delius. The piece underwent repeated revisions that resulted in the existence of three major versions which significantly differ from one another. The first public performance of any version was played by Julius Buths with the conductor Hans Haym on 24 October 1904 in Elberfeld, Germany.

== Background ==
In 1887, Delius was in Leipzig, where he got to know Edvard Grieg, who presented him with a copy of his Piano Concerto at Christmas of the same year. The next year, in London, Delius attended a concert in which Grieg played his concerto to great acclaim. The success of his senior contemporary's piano concerto apparently tempted him to create his own work of this genre. But, despite his starting on it shortly after that, and completing a number of sketches, it was not until 1897 that he finished the first version of the piece (Fantasy in C minor for Piano and Orchestra) which consisted of three continuously played parts including a middle section in D♭ major. Although Delius played a two-piano reduction of this first version with Ferruccio Busoni in 1898, it was never performed in public.

For reasons that are unknown, Delius revised the Fantasy, which he extensively reconstructed into traditional concerto form with three movements. He set the D♭ part as an independent movement and wrote a finale with totally new material. This second version was premiered in 1904 and moderately praised, but Delius was not satisfied. Again, he began rewriting the concerto. The finale was removed and the D♭ part was placed in the centre of the first movement; the overall construction was similar to that of the first version. Additionally, his consultation with the Hungarian pianist Theodor Szántó, a pupil of Busoni, led to very substantial revisions in the solo part. The first performance of this version was played by Szántó, at a Prom Concert in London on 22 October 1907, under Henry Wood. Szántó received the dedication of the work. He also played the work at the Proms in 1912, 1913 and 1921. This final version has become the standard version, but Delius's original conception has been recorded.

Possibly because of its complicated history and a solo part substantially rewritten by another hand, this concerto remains less recognised than the other mature concertos of the composer.

== Music ==
The concerto is scored for solo piano, 3 flutes, 2 oboes, English horn, 2 clarinets, 2 bassoons, 4 horns, 2 trumpets, 3 trombones, tuba, timpani, percussion, and strings

The concerto consists of three movements:

1. Moderato in C minor, 4/4
2. Largo in D♭, 4/4
3. Maestoso in C minor 4/4

The first version of 1897 is a three-in-one structure of "Allegro non troppo"—"Largo"—"Tempo primo". The 1904 version comprises three movements of "Allegro ma non troppo", "Largo", and "Maestoso con moto moderato".

The following description is mainly based on the final version.

=== I. Moderato ===
This part is written in sonata form. A six-bar orchestral introduction is followed by a solo piano. This opening remained unchanged in all three versions. In the tempo molto tranquillo, the soloist plays the lyric second subject with the accompaniment of strings and horn. Recent study shows that these two themes reflect the influence of spiritual music which the composer heard in his period in Florida. The development, which starts in tempo quietly, expands by changing its atmosphere with demanding passages for the solo piano. This part does not appear in the final version, where the climax of the second subject is directly connected to the next section.

=== II. Largo ===
The section starts with a calm monologue by solo piano. After an echo of the first theme from the earlier section, the subject is played by the orchestra in romantic vein, with ornamentation by the piano. The music gradually accelerates, to the dignified presentation of the main theme by horns. A calm piano solo comes back subsequently and the dialogue between piano and cello diminishes to ppp. Finally, a technically demanding piano passage bridges this section to the final part.

=== III. Maestoso ===
The solo piano marks the beginning of the final section by decisively repeating the first subject of the concerto. In this section, numerous glissandos are played by the soloist. Shortly after the recapitulation of the second theme, the tempo changes into Vivace and the soloist plays arpeggio against a timpani rhythm echoed from the first section. The tempo immediately returns to Maestoso; the coda using both subjects. Finally, the concerto ends in C major where the piano soloist has a triumphant scale while the timpani beats the previous rhythm.

=== Total time ===
The time required for the performance is different between versions.

- 1897 version: about 30 min
- 1904 version: about 28 min
- 1907 version: about 22 min

== Selected recordings ==
- 1897 version: Howard Shelley, Sir Andrew Davis, Royal Scottish National Orchestra (Chandos CHAN10742)
- 1904 version: Piers Lane, David Lloyd-Jones, Ulster Orchestra (Hyperion Records CDA67296)
- 1904 version: Clifford Curzon, John Pritchard, BBC Symphony Orchestra, (BBC Legends BBCL4181-2, recording of concert given 3 September 1981)
- 1907 version: Mark Bebbington, Jan Latham-Koenig, Royal Philharmonic Orchestra (Somm Recordings SOMMCD 269)
