= Marcus Bosch =

German conductor

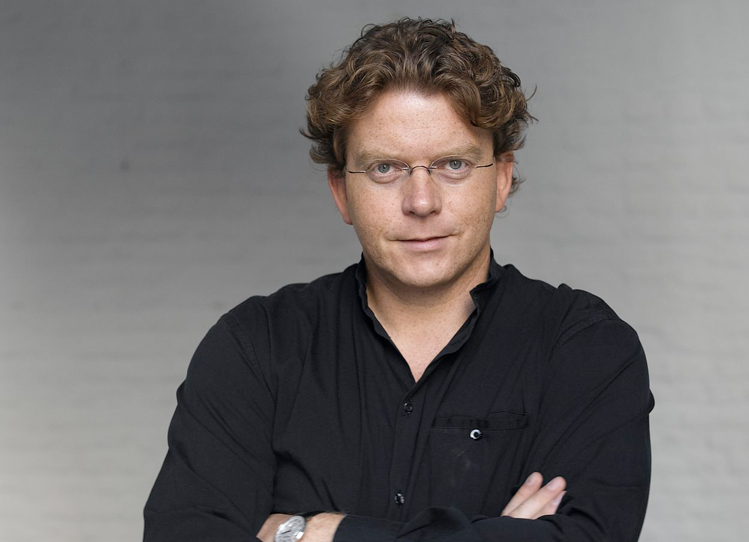
- Born: 28 October 1969 (age 56); Heidenheim an der Brenz
- Occupations: Classical conductor; Academic teacher
- Organizations: Sinfonieorchester Aachen; Staatstheater Nürnberg; Opernfestspiele Heidenheim; Musikhochschule München; Norddeutsche Philharmonie Rostock
- Website: www.marcus-bosch.de

Marcus Bosch (born 28 October 1969) is a German conductor. He was Generalmusikdirektor (GMD) in Aachen, held the position at the Staatstheater Nürnberg from 2011, and with the Norddeutsche Philharmonie Rostock from 2020. He is the artistic director of an opera festival in his home town. Conducting internationally, he was appointed professor at the Musikhochschule München in 2016. He was acclaimed for his recording of Bruckner's complete symphonies, among others.

== Career ==
Born in Heidenheim an der Brenz, Bosch studied in Heidelberg and Mannheim. He took the Kapellmeister career, working in Osnabrück, at theatres in Wiesbaden and Saarbrücken, and with the Staatsorchester Halle, to learn a large repertory in opera and concert.

He conducted as a guest orchestras such as Orchestre National de Belgique, Orchestre Philharmonique du Luxembourg, Orchestra Nazionale della RAI Torino, Düsseldorfer Symphoniker, MDR Sinfonieorchester, Münchner Philharmoniker, Staatskapelle Dresden. He conducted opera at the GöteborgsOperan and the Komische Oper Berlin, among others.

Bosch is a regular guest at the Hamburgische Staatsoper, where he first conducted Beethoven's Fidelio in 2005, later Mozart's Die Entführung aus dem Serail, Weber's Der Freischütz, Verdi's Falstaff and York Höller's Der Meister und Margarita.

He was Generalmusikdirektor in Aachen from 2002, where he recorded works by Mahler, Mozart, Verdi, Brahms and Wagner with the Sinfonieorchester Aachen. He recorded Bruckner's complete symphonies, and received acclaim especially for his readings of the Third (in the first version of 1873), the Seventh and the Eighth. From 2010, he has directed the opera festival Opernfestspiele Heidenheim in his hometown.

With the 2011/12 season, Bosch succeeded Christof Prick as GMD at the Staatstheater Nürnberg. His rendition of Wagner's Tristan und Isolde, with Vincent Wolfsteiner and Lioba Braun in the title roles, was broadcast live on radio and to 50 cinemas in Germany and Austria. A reviewer noted a sound world with clear contours ("Konturscharfe Klangräume"), serving the dramatic action.

In 2016, Bosch was appointed professor of conducting at the Musikhochschule München. He will leave the GMD position in Nürnberg after the 2017/18 season to focus on teaching in Munich, where he will lead the university orchestra. Also in 2016 Bosch founded the Capella Aquileia whose players are from the Heidenheim Opera Orchestra. The orchestra's first recording, a Coviello Classics CD of Schumann's Second and Fourth Symphonies and "Genoveva" Overture, was nominated for an International Classical Music Award ("Symphonic" Category) in 2017.

Bosch became conductor in residence of the in Norddeutsche Philharmonie Rostock in 2018, and became chief conductor in 2020.

== Recordings ==
Most recordings by Bosch were on Hybrid SACD for the label Coviello Classics. In the following table, only other media and labels are noted. His recordings are held by the German National Library.

Title	Composer	Year	Label	Medium
Missa solemnis	Beethoven	2008		CD
Symphonies No. 1 & 4	Brahms	2006		
Ein deutsches Requiem	Brahms	2007		
Symphony No. 1	Bruckner	2011		
Symphony No. 2	Bruckner	2010		
Symphony No. 3	Bruckner	2006		
Symphony No. 4	Bruckner	2008		
Symphony No. 5	Bruckner	2005		
Symphony No. 6	Bruckner	2005		
Symphony No. 7	Bruckner	2004		
Symphony No. 8	Bruckner	2003		
Symphony No. 9	Bruckner	2007		
Alexanderfest	Handel	2007		
Symphony No. 2 "Auferstehung"	Mahler	2005	?	
Symphonies No. 1 & 5	Mendelssohn	2009		
Concertos for two pianos K. 365 & 242	Mozart	2005	Oehms Classics	
Geistliche Werke (sacred works)	Mozart	2006		
Requiem	Mozart	2003		
secret notes	Marijn Simons	2004	Northwest Classics	CD
Rhapsody for Cello and Orchestra, Suite from Les amants de Téruel	Theodorakis	2005		
Messa da Requiem	Verdi	2005		
Die Meistersinger von Nürnberg	Wagner	2011		DVD
World of Baroque Vol. 5		2003	EMI	CD
Aufbruch Kammerphilharmonie Graubünden		2004	CD	
Symphonies 2 & 4, Genoveva Overture	Schumann	2016	Coviello Classics	CD
