= Fernando Corrêa de Oliveira =

Fernando Corrêa de Oliveira (Porto, November 2, 1921 – October 21, 2004) was a Portuguese composer. Among his works are numerous pieces for orchestra, as well as a deal of chamber music; he also composed some vocal pieces and two operas, one of which, O Cábula, was the first Portuguese opera for children.
