= Artur Cimirro =

Brazilian musician

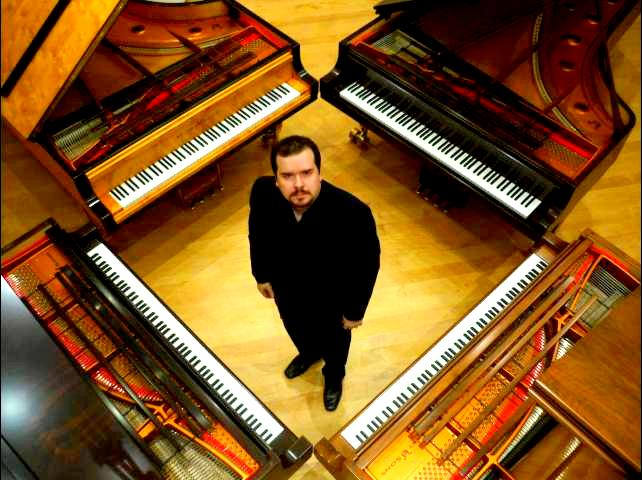
- Artur Cimirro
- Born: Artur Cimirro Pereira; September 30, 1982 (age 43); Bagé, Brazil
- Occupations: composer, Pianist and art critic

Artur Cimirro (born September 30, 1982) is a Brazilian pianist, composer and art critic.

== Biography ==
Born in Bagé, Brazil, Artur Cimirro started his musical studies in 1995 with the acoustic guitar and in 2001 focused on the piano.

As a composer, Cimirro is strongly influenced by the composer/pianists of different languages such as Franz Liszt, Leopold Godowsky, Ferruccio Busoni, and Kaikhosru Shapurji Sorabji.

== Compositions ==
Among Cimirro's works is a Piano Sonata (his Op. 3) which takes two hours to be played in six movements, as well as symphonic works including two Symphonic Poems (No. 1 "The Masque of the Red Death" based on Edgar Allan Poe's tale with the same name, and No. 2 "Curupira").

Cimirro wrote his second set of Eccentric Preludes Op. 13 for Stuart & Sons 102-key pianos and he was the first composer to make piano pieces using the range limits of 108 keys from contra C to the top b in his Eccentric Preludes Op. 20.

Cimirro was described by the director of the French Les Amis Des Cabardièses music festival as "The Reincarnation of Liszt".

In 2018, sheet music publisher Master Music Publications released a selection of Cimirro's works.

== Performance ==
In 2008, Cimirro was the first foreigner to win the “V Konkurs na Projekt Nagraniowy Zapomniana Muzyka Polska”, an award issued by Polish record label Acte Préalable for the most interesting recording project devoted to "forgotten Polish music." Acte Préalable released Cimirro's proposal, a recording of the complete piano works of Karol Tausig, on CD.

In May 2010 Cimirro received in Rio Grande do Sul state (Brazil) the trophy “Bravo – Álvaro Godoy”.

== Discography ==
- 2011 - Artur Cimirro plays Stuart & Sons in Terra Australis
- 2016 - Karol Tausig (1841-1871) - Complete Original Piano Works AP0359
- 2016 - Aleksander Michałowski (1851-1938) - Piano Works 1 AP0365
- 2016 - Géza Zichy (1849-1924) - Complete Piano Works
- 2016 - Géza Zichy (1849-1924) - Complete Piano Transcriptions AP0372
- 2017 - Tivadar Szántó (1877-1934) - Complete Piano Works 1 AP0386
- 2017 - Tivadar Szántó (1877-1934) - Complete Piano Works 2 AP0387
- 2017 - Artur Cimirro (1982-) - Piano Works 1 AP0400
- 2017 - Józef Wieniawski (1837-1912) - Piano Works 4 AP0406
- 2018 - Theodore Dubois (1837-1924) - Works for Piano 1 AP0431
- 2018 - Theodore Dubois (1837-1924) - Works for Piano 2 AP0432
- 2018 - Theodore Dubois (1837-1924) - Works for Piano 3 AP0433
- 2018 - Joaquim Antonio Barrozo Netto (1881-1941) - Works for Piano 1 AP0451
- 2018 - Joaquim Antonio Barrozo Netto (1881-1941) - Works for Piano 2 AP0452
- 2019 - Aleksandra Garbal (1970) - Selected Works for Piano AP0465
