= Julius Rietz =

German composer, conductor, cellist, and teacher (1812–1877)

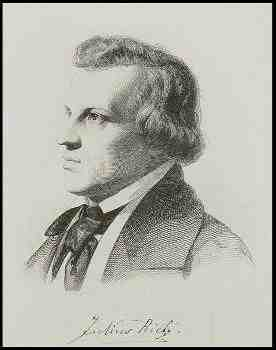
August Wilhelm Julius Rietz

August Wilhelm Julius Rietz (28 December 1812 – 12 September 1877) was a German composer, conductor, cellist, and teacher. His students included Woldemar Bargiel, Salomon Jadassohn, Arthur O'Leary, and (by far the most celebrated) Sir Arthur Sullivan. He also edited many works by Felix Mendelssohn for publication.

== Biography ==
Rietz was born in Berlin, and studied the cello under Bernhard Romberg and composition under Carl Friedrich Zelter. At 16, he joined the orchestra of Berlin's Königstädter Theater, for which he wrote the music to Karl Eduard von Holtei's play Lorbeerbaum und Bettelstab. In 1834, he was appointed assistant conductor at the Düsseldorf Opera under Mendelssohn, whom he succeeded the following year. He moved in 1847 to Leipzig, where he served as kapellmeister and conductor of the Singakademie. During 1848, a year after Mendelssohn's death, Rietz took over Mendelssohn's former role as conductor of the Gewandhaus concerts in the same city, and as teacher of composition at the Leipzig Conservatory. He was called to Dresden in 1860 to succeed Carl Gottlieb Reissiger as court kapellmeister. Here he spent the rest of his life, frequently appearing as an opera conductor, and also undertaking the direction of the Dresden Royal Conservatory.

== Compositions ==
In terms of his own composing, Rietz belonged to the classically inclined school (Mendelssohn's output, as might be expected, had a big influence upon him) and he was strongly opposed to the musical radicalism of Liszt and Wagner. Among his works are the operas, three symphonies, several overtures to plays, flute sonatas, violin sonatas, motets, masses, psalms, and a quantity of other church music.

=== Operas ===
- Jery und Bätely (1839)
- Das Mädchen aus der Fremde (1839)
- Der Korsar (1850)
- Georg Neumann und die Gambe (1859)

=== Symphonies ===
- Symphony No. 1 in G minor, Op. 13 (1843)
- Symphony No. 2 in A major, Op. 23 (1846?)
- Symphony No. 3 in E-flat major, Op. 31 (1855)

=== Overtures ===
- Concert Overture in A major, Op. 7
- Hero und Leander, Op. 11
- Lustspielouvertüre, Op. 53

=== Concertos ===
- Clarinet Concerto, Op. 29
- Concert Piece for Oboe and Orchestra, Op. 33
- Cello Concerto, Op. 16

== Legacy ==
The Louisville Orchestra First Edition series contained, besides many works mostly by modern composers (usually American), Rietz' Concert Overture, opus 7 (coupled with the second symphony of Max Bruch), and recorded around 1970. This may have been the same concert overture commissioned by the Lower Rhenish Music Festival to commemorate an anniversary.
