= Julius Buths =

German musician (1851–1920)

Buths in 1902

Julius Buths (7 May 1851 – 12 March 1920) was a German pianist, conductor and minor composer. He was particularly notable in his early championing of the works of Edward Elgar in Germany. He conducted the continental European premieres of both the Enigma Variations and The Dream of Gerontius. He also had notable associations with Frederick Delius and Gustav Mahler.

== Early career ==
Julius Emil Martin Buths was born in Wiesbaden, the son of an oboist. He studied music at Cologne under Ferdinand Hiller and others, in Berlin under Friedrich Kiel, in Italy and in Paris. He worked as a conductor in Breslau from 1875 to 1879, then in Elberfeld until 1890. That year he was appointed musical director for the city of Düsseldorf, and he played an important role in the Lower Rhenish Music Festivals for a number of years. In 1890, he was co-director with Hans Richter; in 1893 he was sole director; in 1896, he shared the role with Johannes Brahms and Richard Strauss; 1902 co-director with Strauss; and sole director in 1905.

In Düsseldorf he frequently played chamber music with Max Reger and Joseph Joachim.

== Elgar ==
Buths was present in Birmingham at the premiere of Edward Elgar's The Dream of Gerontius in October 1900. He was very impressed with the oratorio, made the German translation of the work, and with support from August Jaeger produced its German and European premiere on 19 December 1901 in Düsseldorf; Elgar was present and wrote "It completely bore out my idea of the work: the chorus was very fine". Buths produced it in Düsseldorf again on 19 May 1902 in conjunction with the Lower Rhenish Music Festival. The soloists included Muriel Foster, and Elgar was again in the audience, being called to the stage 20 times to receive the audience's applause. This was the performance that finally convinced Elgar that he had written a truly satisfying work. Buths's festival co-director Richard Strauss was impressed enough by what he heard that, at a post-concert banquet, he said: I drink to the success and welfare of the first English progressive musician, Meister Elgar. Both the 1901 and 1902 performances were sold out.

In the meantime, Buths had conducted the European and German premiere of the Enigma Variations, in Düsseldorf on 7 February 1901.

He was also responsible for the German translation and German premiere of Elgar's The Apostles, and the German translation of The Kingdom. While in Germany to conduct his First Symphony in Krefeld in December 1910, Elgar took the trouble to visit Buths in Düsseldorf. Elgar also dedicated his piano piece Skizze to Buths.

== Delius ==
Buths' enthusiasm for English music also extended to the works of Frederick Delius. As a pianist, he was the soloist in the first performance of Delius's Piano Concerto in C minor, at Elberfeld in 1904, conducted by Hans Haym (1860–1921). He also prepared a two-piano reduction of the score. He conducted the second performance of Appalachia, at the Lower Rhenish Music Festival, in June 1905.

== Mahler ==
He conducted Gustav Mahler's Resurrection Symphony in Düsseldorf on 3 April 1903, in preparation for which he engaged in correspondence with the composer, who advised him to ensure a significant pause between the first and second movements. Buths nevertheless inserted the long pause (five minutes) between the fourth and fifth movements, for which Mahler congratulated him on his insight and sensitivity, and courage in daring to ignore the composer's wishes.

In 1906, along with Ossip Gabrilowitsch, Alban Berg and Oskar Fried, he attended the rehearsals for the premiere of Mahler's Sixth Symphony in Essen and they all dined with the composer.

== First performances ==
Julius Buths' other first performances as a conductor included the Düsseldorf premieres of

- Johann Sebastian Bach's Mass in B minor
- Hector Berlioz's La damnation de Faust and Grande Messe des Morts
- Giuseppe Verdi's Requiem

and the German premiere of Charles Villiers Stanford's Requiem, Op. 63.

He composed a Piano Concerto in D minor, a cantata Rinaldo, a string quartet, a piano quintet, some songs and instrumental pieces.

In 1902 he became Director of the Düsseldorf Conservatory, in which post he remained until 1908. He died there in 1920, aged 68.
