= Mecklenburgische Staatskapelle =

German orchestra

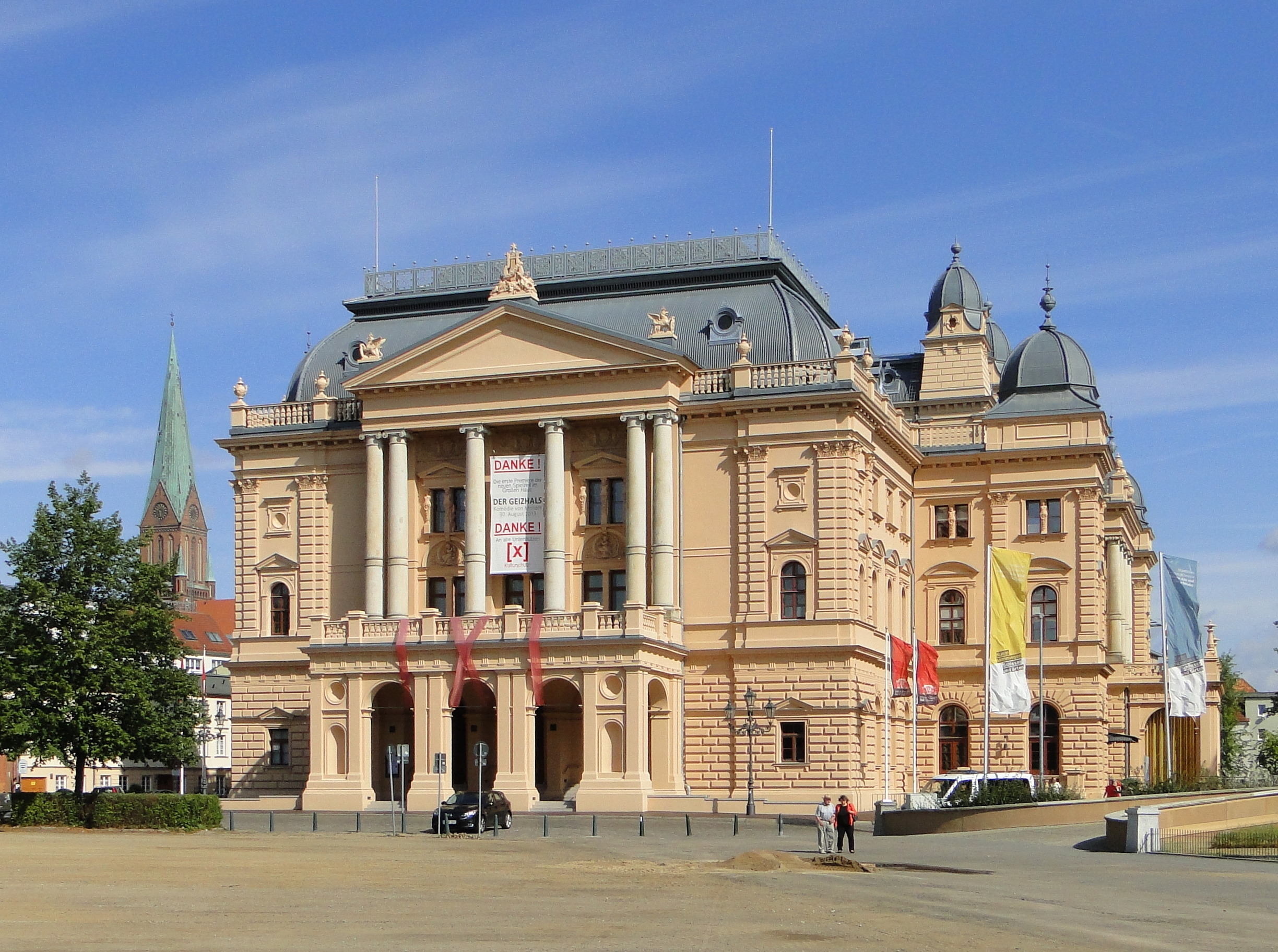
Mecklenburg State Theatre in Schwerin, Main Auditorium; the principal venue of the Mecklenburg State Orchestra

The Mecklenburgische Staatskapelle is a symphony orchestra based in Schwerin, Germany, that was founded in 1563.
