= Aachener Domchor =

German boys' choir

- Choir
- Origin: Aachen Cathedral
- Founded: 782
- Genre: boys' choir
- Chief conductor: Berthold Botzet
- Website: dommusik-aachen.de/ensembles/

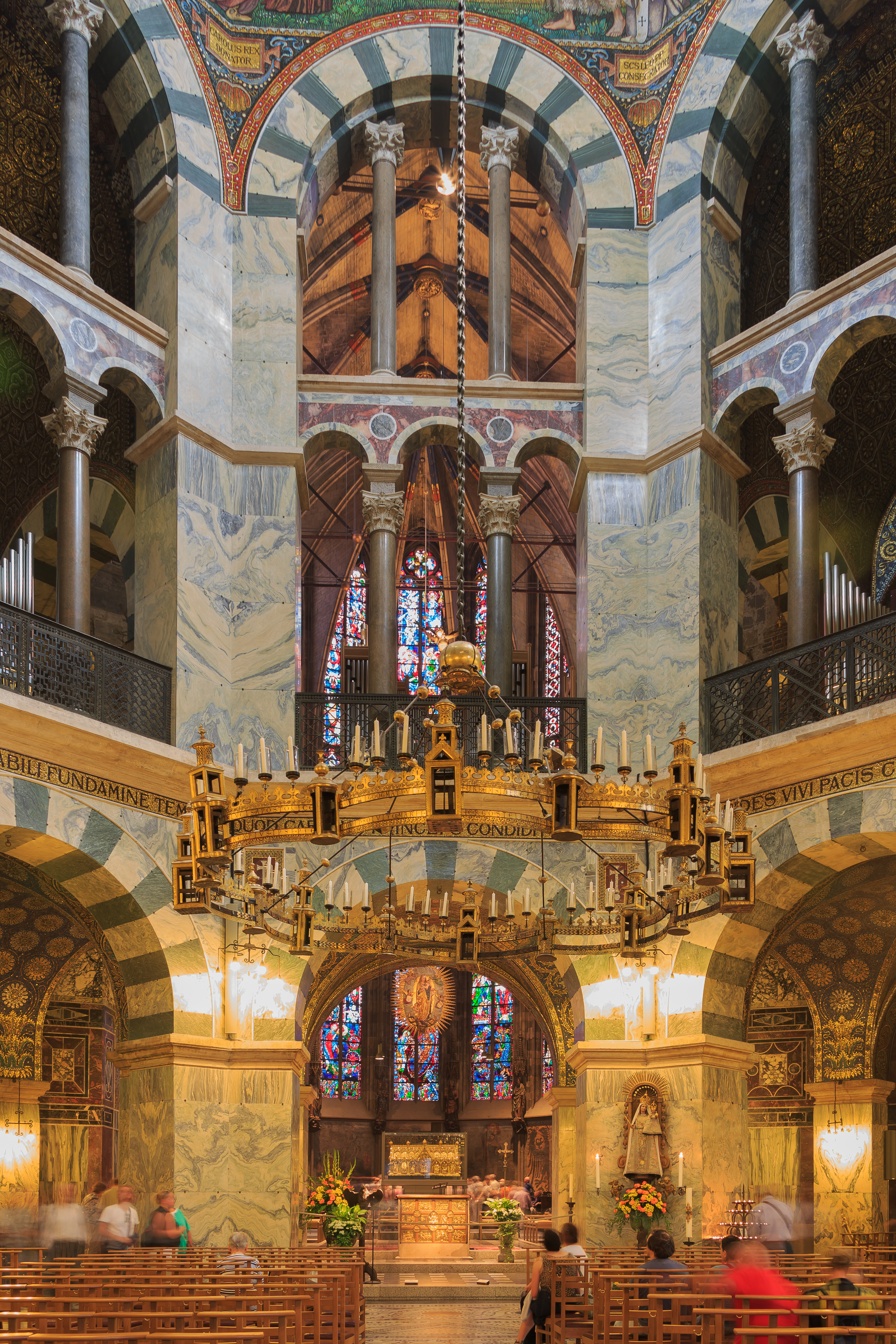
Interior of Aachen Cathedral

Aachener Domchor (Aachen Cathedral choir) is the oldest boys' choir in Germany and one of the oldest in the world. It is based at the Aachen Cathedral in Aachen, a former capital of the Carolingian Empire. The year 782 is given for its founding by Charlemagne and Alcuin of York. Under a succession of directors, the choir gained an international reputation, benefiting from an associated school. Since 2000, the Domchor has been directed by Berthold Botzet.

== History ==
The Aachener Domchor is the oldest boys' choir in Germany and one of the oldest in the world. It is based at the Aachen Cathedral in Aachen, a former capital of the Carolingian Empire. The choir is sometimes also identified using its Latin name, Cappella Carolina. The choir dates back more than 1200 years, with the year 782 given for its founding. It served church music at the cathedral for the court of Charlemagne. The choir school (schola cantorum) was founded by the emperor and Alcuin of York, and was known then as the Schola Palatina, the "Palatinate Choir".

Under a succession of Kapellmeister (choir directors, literally: "chapel masters"), the Aachener Domchor gained an international reputation, benefiting musically and in terms of support from important individuals from close collaboration with the medieval monastic school, today the Aachen Cathedral Choir School (Aachener Domsingschule), and also from cooperation with the Katholische Hochschule für Kirchenmusik St. Gregorius, founded in 1881, and the first school for organists in western Germany with boarding facilities (closed 2007).

Since 2000, the Domchor has been directed by Berthold Botzet. Botzet is assisted by the cathedral cantor, who is also in charge of the girls' choir at Aachen Cathedral: Marco Fühner was appointed to this post in July 2013.

The choir tours internationally, and has collaborated with other boys' choirs and youth choirs in Europe. It was awarded the Kaiser Karl IV Medal, an Aachen cultural prize, in 2013, together with the youth choir Svonky from Prague.

== Kapellmeister ==
Leading directors of the music in stift and cathedral (kapellmeister) have included:

- 16th century: Johannes Mangon (1525–1578) (cantor and Stiftskapellmeister)
- 1745–1772 Anton Joseph Lacand
- 1835–1840 Anton Felix Schindler (municipal music director
- 1864–1891 Heinrich Böckeler (from 1881 director of the Gregoriushaus)
- 1891–1913 Franz Nekes
- 1913–1918 Johannes Mölders
- 1918–1924 Leo Wachten
- 1924–1963 Theodor Bernhard Rehmann (1945–1946 interim municipal Generalmusikdirektor (GMD))
- 1964–1986 Rudolf Pohl
- 1986–2000 Hans-Josef Roth
- from 2000 Berthold Botzet
