= Theater Aachen =

Coordinates: 50°46′21″N 6°05′14″E

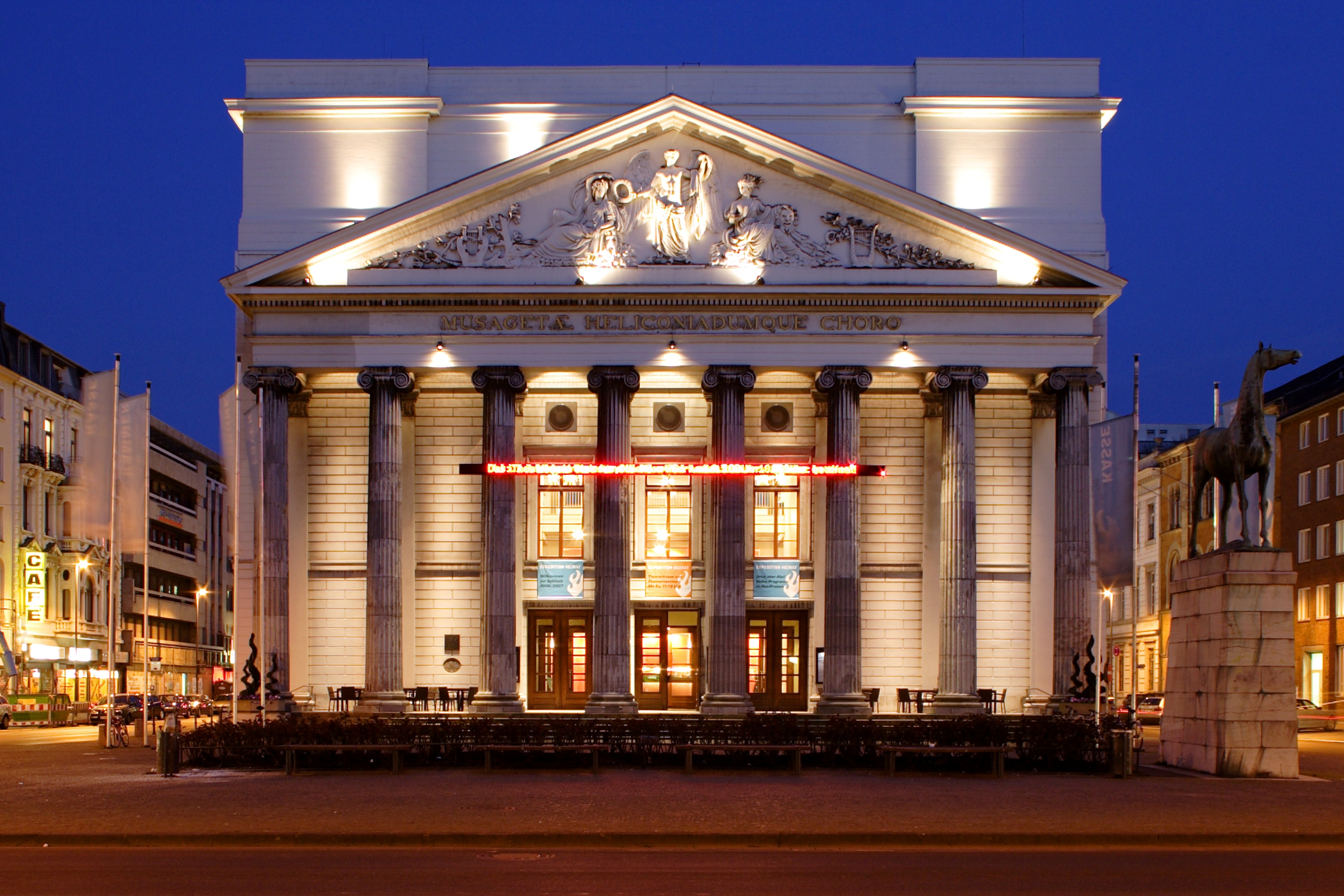
Theater Aachen

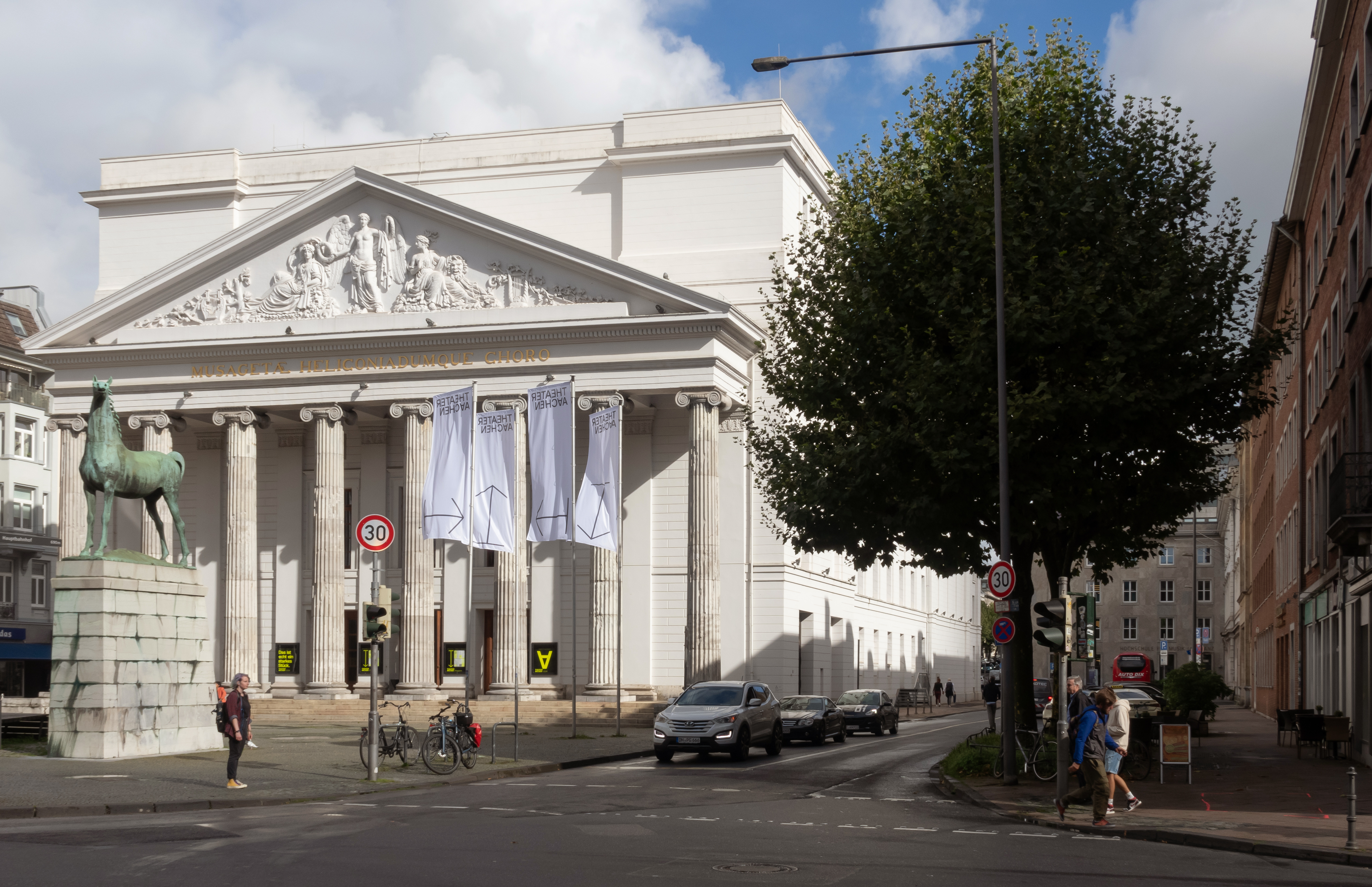
Theater Aachen

Theater Aachen is a theatre in Aachen, Germany. It is the principal venue in that city for operas, musical theatre and plays. It is the home of the Sinfonieorchester Aachen. The original project was by Johann Peter Cremer, later altered by Karl Friedrich Schinkel. Construction on the original theatre began in 1822 and it opened on 15 May 1825. A bomb attack on 14 July 1943 destroyed the first theatre, and the current structure was inaugurated on 23 December 1951 with a performance of Richard Wagner's Die Meistersinger von Nürnberg.

== Conductors ==
The conductors of the theatre have also been Generalmusikdirektor of Aachen:

- 1920–1935 Peter Raabe
- 1935–1942 Herbert von Karajan
- 1942–1944 Paul van Kempen
- 1946–1953 Felix Raabe
- 1953–1958 Wolfgang Sawallisch
- 1958–1962 Hans Walter Kämpfel
- 1962–1974 Wolfgang Trommer
- 1974–1983 Gabriel Chmura
- 1984–1990 Yoram David
- 1990–1992 Bruce Ferden
- 1993–1996 Yukio Kitahara
- 1997–2002 Elio Boncompagni
- 2002–2012 Marcus Bosch
- 2012–2017 Kazem Abdullah
- 2017–2018 Justus Thorau
- 2018-2026 Christopher Ward
- since 2026 Levente Török.
