= Johannes Mangon =

Francophone Belgian composer

Johannes Mangon (c. 1525 in Liège – 1578 in Aachen) was a Francophone composer from the Spanish Netherlands. He was selected while a boy in Liége to join the choir at the Cathedral of Aix-la-Chapelle, that is to say Aachen in modern Germany. He rose to become maître de chapelle. Among his surviving works are 20 masses and over 100 motets, hymns etc, contained in 3 large choirbooks he copied for Aachen Cathedral which are still preserved there. He died of the plague in 1578 and was succeeded by Lambertus de Monte (Liége, d.1606) and then Michael Wilhelm (fl. 1580–1610).

== Works, editions and recordings ==
- O rex orbis: Officium in festo sancti Karoli. Vespers for 28 January on the eve of the Feast of Saint Charles – works by Johannes Mangon, Lambertus de Monte, Michael Wilhelm, Roland de Lassus, Exsultemus, Eric Rice. Musique en Wallonie 2013
