= Acte Préalable =

Polish record label

Acte Préalable is a Polish classical music record label founded in 1997. The name makes reference to an unfinished mystical composition by Scriabin, L'acte préalable, the 'preconditional' movement to his planned apocalyptic work Mysterium.

The label is known for recordings, sometimes premiere commercial recordings, of works by lesser known Polish composers - including Grażyna Bacewicz, Zygmunt Stojowski and many others.

== WWW ==
https://acteprealable.com
