= Hans Walter Kämpfel =

German conductor and composer (b. 1924, d. 2016)

Hans Walter Kämpfel (22 June 1924 – 22 April 2016) was a German conductor, composer and Generalmusikdirektor in Aachen and Bremen.

== Life and career ==
Kämpfel was born in Dünzing near Ingolstadt. After passing his Abitur in 1942 at the Wilhelmsgymnasium München, Kämpfel studied at the Akademie für Tonkunst in Munich, now the Hochschule für Musik und Theater München, with Hans Rosbaud, Joseph Haas and Rosl Schmid, among others. He then began his musical career in 1947 as répétiteur at the Bavarian State Opera. At the same time, he worked for Karl Amadeus Hartmann in the concert series musica viva of Bayerischer Rundfunk, which aimed at the performance and dissemination of contemporary music in Germany.

He then spent several years as Kapellmeister at the Stadtischen Bühnen Gelsenkirchen and Augsburg and as head of opera at the Zürich Opera House before he was called to Aachen in 1958, where he took up the post of general music director at the Theater Aachen there, succeeding Wolfgang Sawallisch. On 1 September 1961 he finally moved to the Bremer Philharmoniker in the same function, where he remained until 1968.

After a period filled with various guest contracts, Kämpfel took over as chief conductor of the symphony orchestra of the Zorneding-Baldham cultural association in Upper Bavaria from 1974 to 2004. In 1990, he founded the Bavarian Classics, a classical 40-piece orchestra with long-time experienced musicians of the symphony orchestra of the cultural association Zorneding. Depending on the programme, he strengthened this orchestra with soloists and renowned guest musicians. With the Bavarian Classics he made numerous guest appearances in Munich, Frankfurt, Geneva, Graz and Shanghai. With a chamber music formation of this orchestra, Kämpfel was a guest in 1995 in the ancient theatre and archaeological museum in Bodrum/Turkey and in the Seagarden in Antalya as well as in the Ankara Opera House. From 2004 on, he retired from all functions due to age, but kept the direction of the serenade concerts.

Throughout his career, Kämpfel has repeatedly received guest contracts at the renowned opera houses in Bochum, Zurich, Graz, Barcelona, Lisbon, and at the Teatro La Fenice Venice, Teatro Lirico Giuseppe Verdi Trieste, Teatro San Carlo Naples. He has performed with renowned orchestras such as the Berlin Philharmonic, the Limburg Symphony Orchestra Maastricht, the Northwest German Philharmonic Herford, the Orchestra del Maggio Musicale Firenze, the Ankara State Orchestra, the Mozarteum Salzburg, the Athens and Thessaloniki State Orchestras and the Philharmonic Orchestras of Nagoya, Tokyo and Sapporo.

On 30 June 2001, Hans-Walter Kämpfel was awarded the Order of Merit of the Federal Republic of Germany by the Bavarian State Ministry for Science and Art in recognition of his numerous merits.

Kämpfel died in Zorneding at the age of 91.
