= Robert Haas (musicologist) =

Austrian musicologist and conductor (1886–1960)

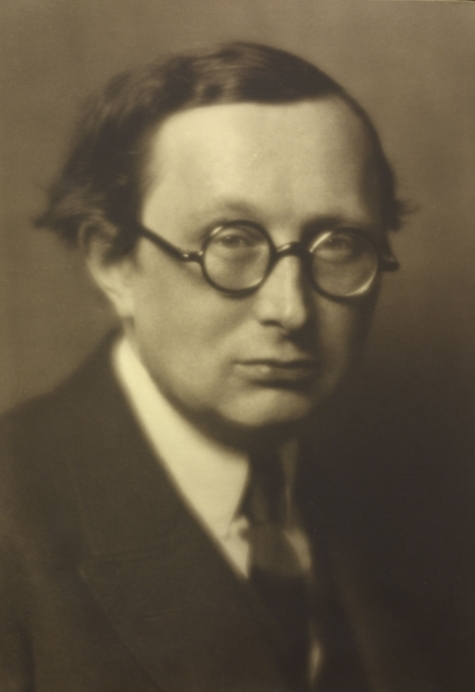
Robert Haas Portrait

Robert Maria Haas (15 August 1886, Prague – 4 October 1960, Vienna) was an Austrian musicologist.

At the beginning of his career with the Austrian national library, Haas was mostly interested in Baroque and Classical music. Later on, he was engaged by the newly formed International Bruckner Society to work on a complete edition of Anton Bruckner's symphonies and Masses based on the original manuscripts bequeathed by the composer to the Vienna library.

== Bruckner Editions ==
Between 1935 and 1944 Haas published editions of Bruckner's, Sixth (1935), Fifth (1935), First (1935), Fourth (1936 and 1944), Second, Eighth (1939) and Seventh (1944) symphonies. (Note: A scholarly edition of Bruckner's Ninth symphony had already been produced in 1932 by Alfred Orel, while Haas's work on the Third symphony was destroyed during the war.)

Haas's editions of Bruckner are controversial. Writing for the Cambridge University Press, Benjamin Korstvedt charges that in the Second, Seventh and Eighth symphonies Haas made changes to Bruckner's musical texts that "went beyond the limits of scholarly responsibility".

For example, the Eighth Symphony existed in three versions: Bruckner's original manuscript of 1887, a revised manuscript of 1890 which incorporated suggestions from Franz Schalk, Arthur Nikisch and others, and the first published edition of 1892 which went even further in the direction of the changes, including significant cuts, suggested by Bruckner's friends. Haas decided to make a composite edition based on the 1890 manuscript but adding in some passages from the 1887 version he (justifiably, in the view of many Brucknerians, including conductors Rudolf Kempe and Georg Tintner) thought it a shame to lose: he also rewrote a brief passage himself. Haas thus produced a text of the symphony, however laudable on its own merits, that didn't happen to correspond to anything ever written or approved by Bruckner. Similar reworking occurs in Haas's edition of the Second Symphony. Some scholars have suggested that Haas was motivated to make these changes in order to assert copyright over his work.

Another source of controversy is Haas's affiliation with the Nazi party, of which he was a member and didn't hesitate or scruple to use the language of Nazism to garner approval for his work. He portrayed Bruckner as being a pure and simple country soul who had been corrupted by "cosmopolitan" and Jewish influences. This proved Haas's undoing: after World War II, he was removed from the Bruckner project and replaced by the more scholarly, if less inventive, Leopold Nowak who went on to produce new editions of all Bruckner's symphonies, including use of the severely cut last (1892) version of the Eighth the composer was persuaded to promulgate for publication.

Conductor Wilhelm Furtwängler criticized what he called Haas's "violation myth" in his private notebooks:

"Only unproductive minds can seriously believe that a great productive artist [i.e., Bruckner] can be 'put under pressure' for the duration of a depression. ... The falsification that is done here to the character of Bruckner – Bruckner as a fool – is much greater than [that done] by the essays [attempts?] of the first scholars, Loewe and Schalk."

On the other hand, conductor Georg Tintner, even as a Jewish victim of Nazi persecution, subsequently described Haas as "brilliant" and called Haas's edition of Bruckner's Eighth Symphony "the best" of all available versions although he himself chose to record the original 1887 version. Many conductors including Herbert von Karajan, Bernard Haitink, Daniel Barenboim, Takashi Asahina and Günter Wand continued to prefer Haas's editions, even after the Nowak editions became available.

== Other work ==
Haas also edited some of the music of Hugo Wolf, Claudio Monteverdi's Il Ritorno d'Ulisse in Patria, Christoph Willibald von Gluck's Don Juan ballet score, and other Baroque music. He also wrote about the Wiener Singspiel, Wolfgang Amadeus Mozart and Johann Sebastian Bach.
