= List of chamber music works by Anton Bruckner =

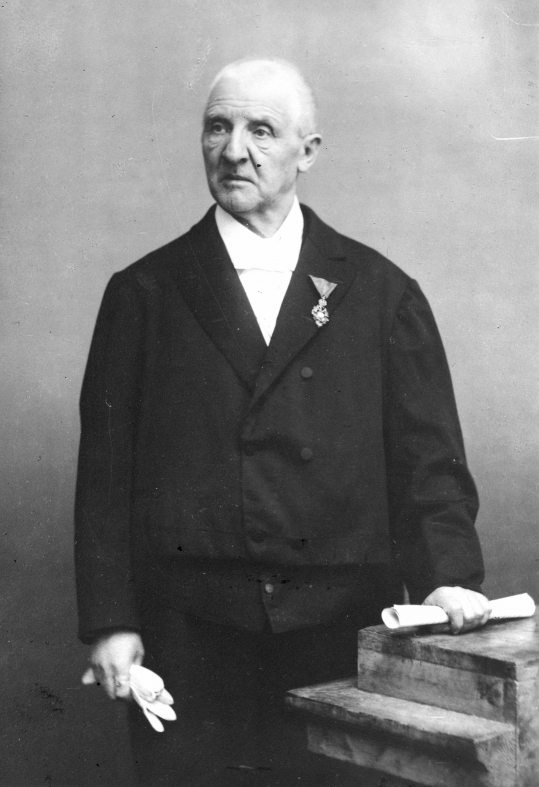
Bruckner with the Order of Franz Joseph, 1886

In addition to his orchestral and vocal compositions, Anton Bruckner composed a few works for chamber ensembles during his stays in Linz and Vienna.

== Linz period ==
After the end of Sechter's tuition, Bruckner studied by Otto Kitzler to exercise further in orchestration. During this period (1862-1863) he composed the following works for string quartet:

- Six scherzi for string quartet, WAB 209. These six scherzi, composed during the spring of 1862, are found on p. 58–74 of the Kitzler-Studienbuch. The Scherzi No. 5 in F major and No. 6 in G minor – with trio – are more extensive compositions.
  The Scherzo No. 6 in G minor, "a dark, quick movement with a schumannesque, sunny Trio in G major", was performed first in an arrangement for string orchestra on 28 May 2016 by the Göttinger Barockorchester under the baton of Benjamin-Gunnar Cohrs.
  The original version of the Scherzi No. 5 in F major and No. 6 in G minor was premiered by the Bruckners Kammermusik ensemble in Tokyo on 8 March 2019. The performances can be heard on John Berky's site.
  On 1st October 2024 the Quatuor Danel performed in the Brucknerhaus Linz an integral of the compositions for string quartet composed during the Kitzler tuition, including a premiere of Nos. 1-4 of the Six Scherzi for string quartet. A recording of this concert is available in the Bruckner Archive.
- Theme and variations in E♭ major, WAB 210, a theme followed by six variations found on p. 92–104 of the Kitzler-Studienbuch. The work was premiered at the opening concert of the St. Florianer Brucknertage 2023. During this premiere, the strings of the Altomonte Orchester performed the two variants of the fifth variation. A year later, a recording by the Diotima Quartet was released.
- The String Quartet in C minor, WAB 111, was composed between 28 July and 7 August 1862 as a further student exercise. The work, which is found on pp. 165–196 of the Kitzler Studienbuch, is issued in Band XIII/1 of the Gesamtausgabe.
- Rondo in C minor, WAB 208. After the completion of the composition of the String Quartet, Kitzler tasked Bruckner with writing a new, more fully developed final rondo for the Quartet. The new rondo, which was composed on 15 August 1862, is found on pp. 197–206 of the Kitzler Studienbuch. It is issued separate in Band XII/1 of the Gesamtausgabe.

During the period following Kitzler's tuition Bruckner composed the following work:

- Abendklänge (Evening harmonies), WAB 110, is a 36-bar long character piece in E minor for violin and piano, which Anton Bruckner composed on 7 June 1866 for Hugo von Grienberger. The work, the manuscript of which is stored in the archive of the Österreichische Nationalbibliothek, is put in Band XII/7 of the Gesamtausgabe.

== Vienna period ==
During his stay in Vienna, Bruckner composed the following works for viola quintet:

- The String Quintet in F major, WAB 112, was composed between December 1878 and July 1879 at the request of Joseph Hellmesberger, Sr. and was dedicated to Duke Max Emanuel of Bavaria. The work, the manuscript of which is stored in the archive of the Österreichische Nationalbibliothek, is put in Band XIII/2 of the Gesamtausgabe.
- The Intermezzo in D minor, WAB 113, was composed on 21 December 1879. It was intended to replace the scherzo of the String Quintet, which Hellmesberger found too challenging for the group to perform. The Intermezzo, the manuscript of which is stored in the archive of the Österreichische Nationalbibliothek, is put with the String Quintet in Band XIII/2 of the Gesamtausgabe.

== Sources ==
- Anton Bruckner: Sämtliche Werke, Band XXV: Das Kitzler Studienbuch (1861-1863), facsimile, Musikwissenschaftlicher Verlag der Internationalen Bruckner-Gesellschaft, Paul Hawkshaw and Erich Wolfgang Partsch (Editors), Vienna, 2015
- Anton Bruckner: Sämtliche Werke: Band XIII/1: Streichquartett C-Moll Musikwissenschaftlicher Verlag der Internationalen Bruckner-Gesellschaft, Leopold Nowak (Editor), Vienna, 1955
- Anton Bruckner: Sämtliche Werke: Band XII/1: Rondo C-Moll, Musikwissenschaftlicher Verlag der Internationalen Bruckner-Gesellschaft, Leopold Nowak (Editor), Vienna, 1985
- Anton Bruckner – Sämtliche Werke, Band XII/7: Abendklänge for violin and piano, Musikwissenschaftlicher Verlag der Internationalen Bruckner-Gesellschaft, Walburga Litschauer (editor), Vienna, 1995
- Anton Bruckner: Sämtliche Werke: Band XIII/2: Streichquintett F-Dur / Intermezzo D-Moll, Musikwissenschaftlicher Verlag der Internationalen Bruckner-Gesellschaft, Gerold W. Gruber (Editor), Vienna, 2007
- Uwe Harten, Anton Bruckner. Ein Handbuch. Residenz Verlag, Salzburg, 1996. ISBN 3-7017-1030-9.
- Cornelis van Zwol, Anton Bruckner 1824-1896 - Leven en werken, uitg. Thoth, Bussum, Netherlands, 2012. ISBN 978-90-6868-590-9
