= Symphony in D minor (Bruckner) =

Symphony by Anton Bruckner

- by Anton Bruckner
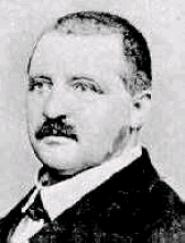
- A portrait of Anton Bruckner, c. 1860
- Key: D minor
- Catalogue: WAB 100
- Composed: 1869
- Published: 1924 (ed. Wöss); 1968 (ed. Leopold Nowak)
- Recorded: 1951 Henk Spruit, Netherlands Philharmonic Orchestra
- Movements: 4

Premiere
- Date: 12 October 1924
- Location: Klosterneuburg
- Conductor: Franz Moissl

The Symphony in D minor, WAB 100, was composed by Anton Bruckner in 1869 between Symphony No. 1 (1866) and Symphony No. 2 (1872). In 1895 Bruckner declared that this symphony "gilt nicht" (does not count) and he did not assign a number to it. The work was published and premiered in 1924.

== Composition ==
Bruckner composed this symphony from 24 January to 12 September 1869. It was initially designated Symphony No. 2, while the C minor symphony of 1872 was called Symphony No. 3.

According to the conductor Georg Tintner, "How an off-hand remark, when directed at a person lacking any self-confidence, can have such catastrophic consequences! Bruckner, who all his life thought that able musicians (especially those in authority) knew better than he did, was devastated when Otto Dessoff (then the conductor of the Vienna Philharmonic) asked him about the first movement: "But where is the main theme?"

In 1895, when Bruckner reviewed his symphonies in order to have them published, he declared that this symphony "does not count" ("gilt nicht"). He wrote on the front page "annullirt" ("nullified") and replaced the original "Nr. 2" with the symbol "∅".

The symbol "∅" was later interpreted as the numeral zero and the symphony got the nickname Die Nullte ("No. 0"). In the words of David Griegel, "Like many other composers, I believe Bruckner was merely being too self-critical, and the unnumbered symphonies are also works worthy of our enjoyment".

Because of the designation Die Nullte, the biographers Göllerich and Auer felt it was composed before Symphony No. 1. Contrary to this assumption, the autograph score is dated 24 January to 12 September 1869, and no earlier sketch or single folio of this work has been retrieved. The work, which is sometimes referred to as "Symphony in D minor, opus posthumous", but in English is most often called "Symphony No. 0", premiered in Klosterneuburg on 12 October 1924.

== Editions ==
The symphony is available in two editions:

- First edition by Josef V. von Wöss (1924)
- Critical edition by Leopold Nowak (1968)

== Description ==
The score calls for a two flutes, two oboes, two clarinets, two bassoons, four horns, two trumpets, three trombones, timpani, and strings.

It has four movements:

1. Allegro
2. Andante
3. Scherzo: Presto – Trio: Langsamer und ruhiger
4. Finale: Moderato

=== First movement ===
The work begins with a D minor ostinato in the strings:

Leopold Nowak suggested that the answer to Dessoff's question is that the principal theme is in the first movement of Symphony No. 3 in D minor, which also begins with an ostinato.

The second theme group, starting in A major, features syncopated exchanges between the first violins:

The third theme group is in F major:

=== Second movement ===
Nowak places all markings of Andante for this B♭ major movement in parentheses:

Unlike most other Bruckner slow movements, this movement is in sonata form. The second theme is introduced by the first violins, accompanied by the second violins and violas:

=== Third movement ===
Loud and rather ferocious, the theme has something of the qualities of the Mannheim rocket, but its chromaticism suggests the future music of Shostakovich.

The Trio's theme in G major has hints of G minor:

On the cover sheet for the 1st movement – fol. 38 of the manuscript A-LIlmMusHS517 – is a draft of an unused trio. Dated: Vienna, 18 March 1869.On 2 July 2022, Ricardo Alejandro Luna conducted the Bolton Symphony Orchestra at the world premiere of the dicarded first trio in A major, that was beforehand transcribed, harmonized, supplemented and orchestrated by him.

Alike the scherzi of the Symphony in F minor, Symphonies No. 1 and No. 2, and the 1878 version of Symphony No. 3, this one has a separate coda for the reprise of the Scherzo.

=== Fourth movement ===
The movement begins with a slow introduction, unusual for a Bruckner Finale; the only other Finale with a slow introduction is in the Fifth Symphony. The theme in the violins is accompanied by semiquavers (i.e. sixteenth notes) in the woodwinds, and will recur in inversion in the development:

This gives way to the main theme of the following Allegro passage, which does double duty as a third theme:

The second theme is reminiscent of Rossini:

The symphony ends in D major with a coda marked Schnell.

== Selected discography ==
The first commercial recording of the symphony was by Fritz Zaun with the Berlin State Opera Orchestra in 1933. It included only the scherzo, in the Wöss edition. The first commercial recording of the complete symphony was by Henk Spruit with the Concert Hall Symphony Orchestra in 1952.

Performances and recordings of the "complete" Bruckner Symphonies often exclude this "nullified" Symphony, most notably excepting the boxed sets of Riccardo Chailly, Eliahu Inbal, Bernard Haitink, Georg Tintner, Simone Young, Gennady Rozhdestvensky, Stanislaw Skrowaczewski and former Chicago Symphony Orchestra conductors Daniel Barenboim and Sir Georg Solti.

=== Wöss edition ===
- Henk Spruit conducting the Concert Hall Symphony Orchestra, Concert Hall LP CHS 1142, 1952

This long out-of-print recording has recently been transferred to CD: Klassic Haus CD GSC 010 https://de.wikipedia.org/wiki/

- Ferdinand Leitner conducting the Bavarian Radio Symphony Orchestra, live performance, Orfeo CD 269921, 1960
- Bernard Haitink conducting the Concertgebouw Orchestra, Philips LP PHS900-131, 1966. Later re-issued in the Philips CD box 442 040-2.

=== Nowak edition ===
- Hortense von Gelmini conducting the Nürnberger Symphoniker, Colosseum LP SM 558, 1975

This long out-of-print recording has recently been transferred to CD, together with the historical recording of the Windhaager Messe by Wolfgang Riedelbauch: Klassic Haus KHCD 2012-007

- Daniel Barenboim conducting the Chicago Symphony Orchestra, Deutsche Grammophon DG CD 159327, 1979
- Georg Tintner conducting the RTÉ National Symphony Orchestra, Naxos CD 8.554215/6, 1996
- Stanisław Skrowaczewski conducting the Saarbrücken Radio Symphony Orchestra, 1999, Arte Nova CD 74321-75510, 1999
- Tatsuya Shimono conducting the Osaka Philharmonic Orchestra, live recording, November 17 & 18, 2005, Symphony Hall, Osaka, Avex Classics SACD AVCL-25099
- Gerd Schaller conducting the Philharmonie Festiva, live recording, 8 March 2015 (Ebrach Summer Music Festival), Profil CD PH 15035

== Sources ==
- Anton Bruckner – Sämtliche Werke, Band XI: Symphonie in d-Moll ("Nullte") 1869, Musikwissenschaftlicher Verlag der Internationalen Bruckner-Gesellschaft, Leopold Nowak (Editor), 1968/1994
- Uwe Harten, Anton Bruckner. Ein Handbuch. Residenz Verlag, Salzburg, 1996. ISBN 3-7017-1030-9.
- Cornelis van Zwol, Anton Bruckner 1824–1896 – Leven en werken, uitg. Thoth, Bussum, Netherlands, 2012. ISBN 978-90-6868-590-9
