= Friedrich Koch =

German composer, cellist and teacher (1862–1927)

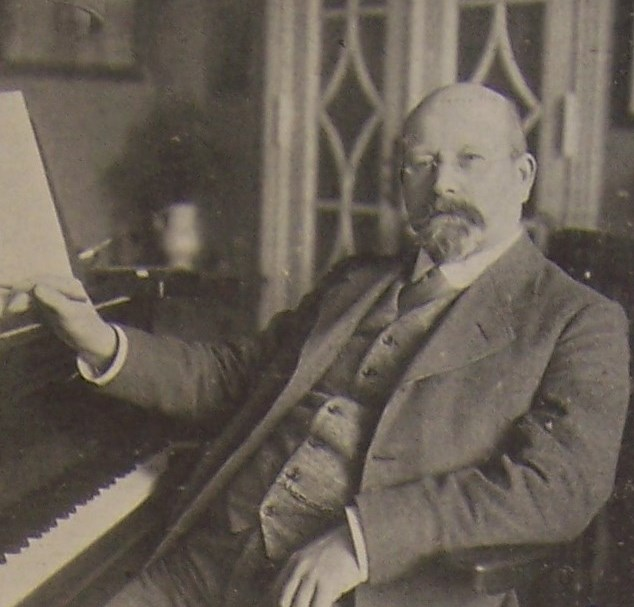
Friedrich Ernst Koch (c. 1912)

Friedrich Ernst Koch (3 July 1862 – 30 January 1927) was a German composer, cellist and teacher.

== Biography ==
Koch was born in Berlin and studied cello with Robert Hausmann and composition with Woldemar Bargiel at the Berlin Hochschule für Musik. He served as a cellist in the Royal Orchestra of Berlin between 1882 and 1891, after which he accepted a position of music director (Kapellmeister) for the resort town of Baden-Baden. A year later, he returned to Berlin, where he concentrated on composing and teaching, eventually becoming a professor and director of theory at the Musikhochschule where he had studied. Boris Blacher, Wolfgang Jacobi, Paul Kletzki and Werner Wolff were among his many students.

His compositions, which were often based on German folk melodies and written in a late Romantic style, gained him considerable recognition and acclaim. His metier was the character piece at which he excelled. Although he did not write much in the way of chamber music, these works were among his best compositions. His string trio, Op. 9, won the Mendelssohn Prize and his Wald-Idyll (Forest Idyll), Three Fantasy Pieces for piano trio, Op. 20, dating from 1902, enjoyed frequent concert performances right up until the Second World War. There is also a violin sonata in A minor (Op. 47) published by C. F. Kahnt in 1925.

He composed two symphonies, in D minor Von der Nordsee (Op. 4) and G (Op. 10, published 1891).
