= Symphony No. 7 (Bruckner) =

Symphony by Anton Bruckner

- by Anton Bruckner
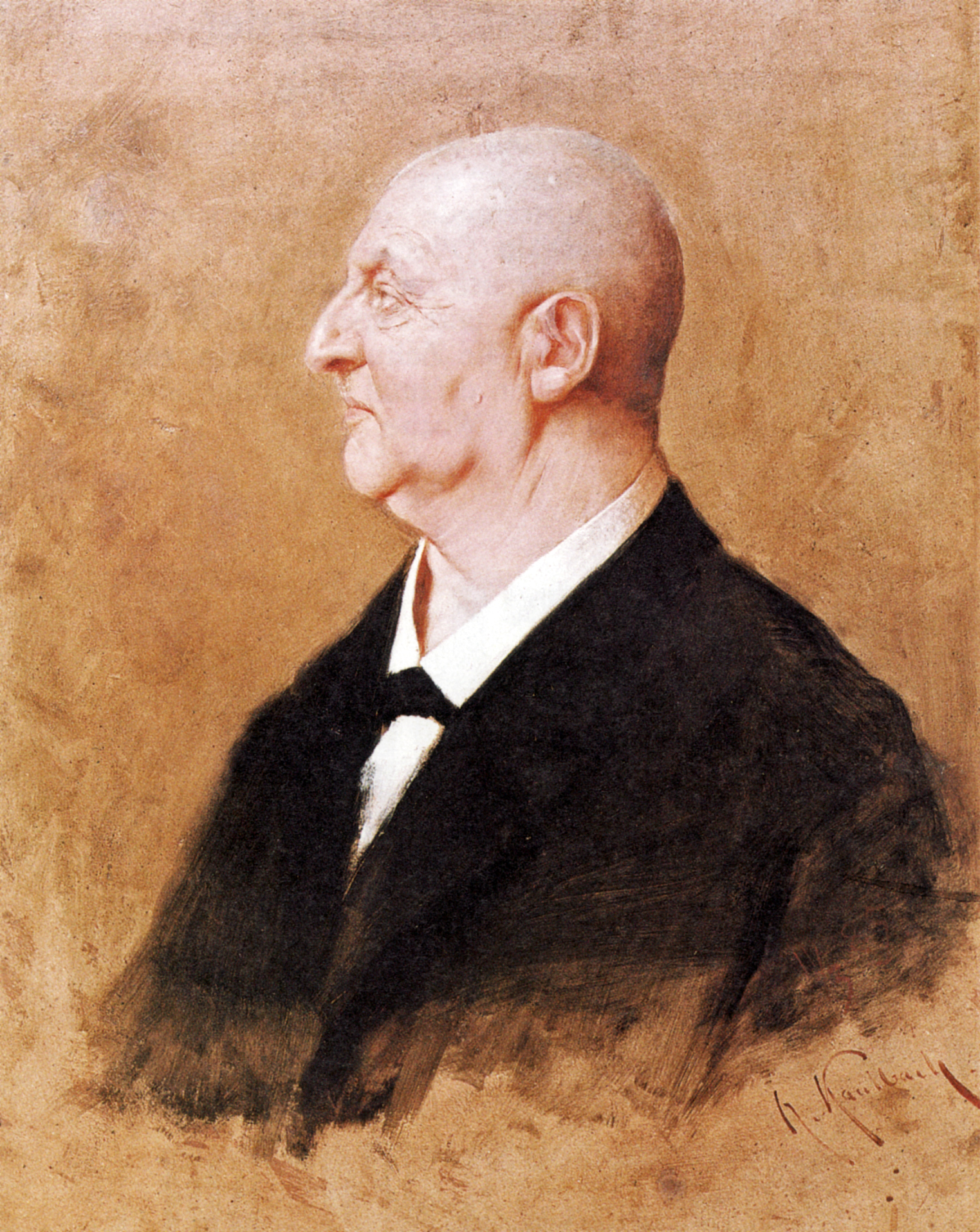
- Portrait of Anton Bruckner (1885)
- Key: E major
- Catalogue: WAB 107
- Composed: 1881–83
- Dedication: Ludwig II of Bavaria
- Published: 1885
- Recorded: 1924 Oskar Fried, Staatskapelle Berlin
- Movements: 4

Premiere
- Date: 30 December 1884
- Location: Stadttheater, Leipzig
- Conductor: Arthur Nikisch

I. Allegro moderato

II. Adagio: Sehr feierlich und sehr langsam

III. Scherzo: Sehr schnell — Trio: Etwas langsamer

IV. Finale: Bewegt, doch nicht schnell

Anton Bruckner's Symphony No. 7 in E major, WAB 107, is one of the composer's best-known symphonies. It was written between 1881 and 1883 and was revised in 1885. It is dedicated to Ludwig II of Bavaria. The premiere, given under Arthur Nikisch and the Gewandhaus Orchestra in the opera house at Leipzig on 30 December 1884, brought Bruckner the greatest success he had known in his life.

In the 2018 article "The 20 Greatest Symphonies of all time" from BBC Music Magazine, this symphony is placed at the 20th position. Bruckner also holds the 13th place with Symphony No. 8.

== Description ==
The symphony has four movements:

1. Allegro moderato (E major)
2. Adagio: Sehr feierlich und sehr langsam (C♯ minor)
3. Scherzo: Sehr schnell (A minor) – Trio: Etwas langsamer (F major)
4. Finale: Bewegt, doch nicht schnell (E major)

=== First movement ===
The first movement starts with tremolo strings and the cellos presenting "a complete, divinely given melodic whole:"

Bruckner declared he heard it in a dream, played on a viola, and wrote it down on awakening, but the tune incorporates a quotation from the Credo of his D minor Mass (1864) which he was currently revising. The main theme is restated before the second theme group appears, with the oboes and clarinets carrying the first theme:

The third theme group is based on octaves, as is typical in Bruckner:

The development features many of the themes in inversion. Near the end of the movement, there is a long pedal point on E, sustained by the double basses and timpani.

=== Second movement ===
This movement was composed between January and April 1883. Bruckner began writing it in anticipation of the death of Richard Wagner, who was in poor health. The movement features four Wagner tubas, which was their first appearance in a symphony:

A contrabass tuba is also present. The second part of the movement, beginning in F♯ major, has a tune that Bruckner specialist Georg Tintner described as such: "If I could describe what makes Bruckner Bruckner to me, it is that tune. It is something which transcends ordinary sorts of feelings. You can't even say 'Is it jolly?' 'Is it sad?' 'Is it that?' 'Is it that?'. You can't say that with a late Beethoven tune either. It is above these things:"

Legend has it that Bruckner wrote the cymbal clash at the climax of this movement upon hearing the news that Wagner had died. By way of contrast, William Mann states that "at the climax of the slow movement Nikisch persuaded Bruckner to add a cymbal clash supported by a triangle; later this addition to the manuscript was marked 'invalid' – but not in the composer's hand, so who was the purist?"

This movement was played on Nazi German radio on 31 January 1943 following the German defeat in the Battle of Stalingrad and, after music by Richard Wagner, preceding the announcement on 1 May 1945 of Hitler's death the day before.

=== Third movement ===
The scherzo is in A minor and opens with a rhythmic string figure and a melody with a leap of an octave played by a solo trumpet:

The Trio is in F major and is in a slower tempo:

=== Fourth movement ===
Unlike the Fifth and Eighth symphonies, where the Finale sums up the entire symphony, this Finale is not as expansive as the other movements. Georg Tintner compared this Finale to the finale of a Haydn symphony. Like the first movement, the fourth movement opens with tremolo strings:

The second theme group is in the distant key of A♭ major:

The third theme group is a characteristic "octave theme" given by the whole orchestra in A minor:

In the recapitulation, the subject groups are reversed in order – a form called "tragic sonata form" or "arch form".

== Versions ==
=== 1883 version ===
This was the version performed at the work's premiere. It survives only in one autograph copy which includes later changes by Bruckner and others, so the exact contents of this version are lost and it is unpublished.

=== 1885 version ===
==== Gutmann edition (published 1885) ====
Some changes were made after the 1884 premiere but before the first publication by Gutmann in 1885. It is widely accepted that Nikisch, Franz Schalk and Ferdinand Löwe had significant influence over this edition, but there is some debate over the extent to which these changes were authorized by Bruckner. These changes mostly affect tempo and orchestration.

==== Haas edition (published 1944) ====
Robert Haas attempted to remove the influence of Nikisch, Schalk and Löwe in order to retrieve Bruckner's original conception of the symphony. Haas used some material from the 1883 autograph but because this autograph also includes later changes much of his work was the product of conjecture. The most significant change in Haas's edition is the absence of cymbals, triangle and timpani in the slow movement: Haas asserted that Bruckner decided to omit the percussion, a claim scholar Benjamin Korstvedt deems "implausible".

==== Nowak edition (published 1954) ====
Leopold Nowak kept most of the changes in the 1885 Gutmann edition, including the percussion. He reprinted the tempo modifications from Gutmann but placed them in brackets. Some performances of this edition omit the cymbal crash at the climax of the slow movement, but it is included in the printed score.

==== Cohrs edition (published 2015) ====
Another edition has been issued by Benjamin-Gunnar Cohrs for the Anton Bruckner Urtext Gesamtausgabe in 2015.

==== 1921 chamber arrangement ====
An arrangement of this symphony for chamber ensemble (consisting of 2 violins, viola, cello, bass, clarinet, horn, piano 4-hands, and harmonium) was prepared in 1921 by students and associates of Arnold Schoenberg, for the Viennese "Society for Private Musical Performances": Hanns Eisler (1st and 3rd movements), Erwin Stein (2nd mvt.), and Karl Rankl (4th mvt.). The Society folded before the arrangement could be performed, and it was not premiered until more than 60 years later.

== Instrumentation ==
The symphony requires the following orchestra:

- woodwinds: two flutes, two oboes, two clarinets in A, two bassoons
- brass: four horns in F, three trumpets in F, three trombones, four Wagner tubas (two tenors in B♭, two basses in F)^{1}, one contrabass tuba
- percussion^{2}: timpani, cymbals, triangle
- strings: violins 1, 2, violas, cellos, double basses

^{1}Used in the 2nd and 4th movements only.

^{2}Except for the third movement where the timpani figure prominently, use of percussion in the symphony is extremely limited. A timpani roll enters at the coda of the first movement. In some performance editions, the timpani re-enters along with cymbals and triangle together in the climax of the second movement (the only movement employing cymbals and triangle). Many conductors perform the second movement without percussion (as in the Haas edition), however; the decision is generally settled by the performers' preferences. In the last movement, the timpani rolls in brief climaxes before crescendoing with orchestral tutti in the final bars.

== Discography ==
The first commercial recording was made by Oskar Fried with the Berlin State Opera Orchestra in 1924 for Polydor. Along with Symphony No. 4, the Seventh is the most popular Bruckner symphony both in the concert hall and on record.

Herbert von Karajan's last recording with the Vienna Philharmonic, 23 April 1989, three months before his death, on the Deutsche Grammophon label, of the Haas edition of the 1885 score, has been singled out by Norman Lebrecht as #80 in his list of the 100 best recordings, and described as "more human and vulnerable" than his earlier Berlin recording. In reviewing the 1999 recording by Kurt Sanderling, the critic David Hurwitz listed as reference (benchmark) recordings of Bruckner's Seventh those by Eugen Jochum in 1976, Bernard Haitink in 1978, Karajan in 1989, and Günter Wand in 1999. Stephen Johnson prefers Karl Böhm's recording with the Vienna Philharmonic, saying that Böhm balances "clear-sighted formal understanding with a more fluid, supple approach to phrasing." The vast majority of modern recordings use vibrato for the strings, with Roger Norrington's recording with the Radio-Sinfonieorchester Stuttgart des SWR being a notable exception.

On BBC Radio 3 in December 2014, John Deathridge selected Bernard Haitink's Concertgebouw recording from 1966 as the 'First Choice' in the 'Building a Library' series. (Wilhelm Furtwangler's 1949 recording with the Berlin Philharmonic was chosen as the top 'Historic' recommendation.)

The chamber arrangement has been recorded, by among others, the Thomas Christian Ensemble, proving to one reviewer "beyond doubt that it simply takes more than 10 musicians, no matter how good they are, to play a Bruckner symphony."
