= Hans von Bülow Medal =

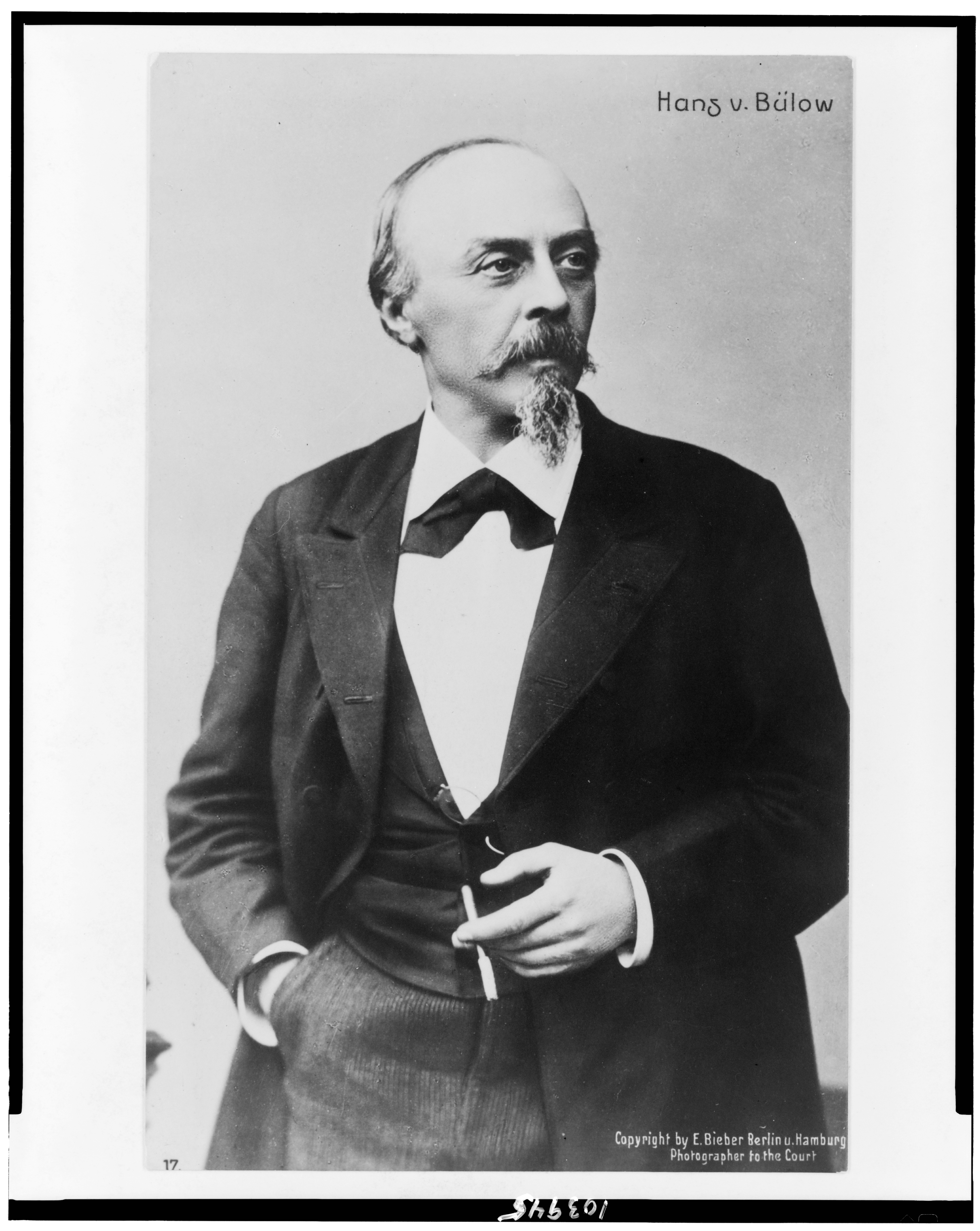
Hans von Bülow, c. 1889

The Hans von Bülow Medal is awarded by the Berlin Philharmonic Orchestra to outstanding musicians close to the orchestra. The medal is named after its first Chief Conductor, Hans von Bülow. The medal is awarded since the 1970s.

- Mariss Jansons, conductor. 2003
- Nikolaus Harnoncourt, conductor. 1999
- Hans Werner Henze, composer. 1997
- Claudio Abbado, conductor
- Wolfgang Sawallisch, conductor. 2003
- Georg Solti, conductor. 1993
- Alfred Brendel, pianist. 1992
- Yehudi Menuhin, violinist and conductor. 1979
- Claudio Arrau, pianist. 1978
- Eugen Jochum, conductor
- Herbert von Karajan, conductor
- Zubin Mehta, conductor
- Daniel Barenboim, conductor and pianist
- Seiji Ozawa, conductor
- Bernard Haitink, conductor
- Günter Wand, conductor
- Lorin Maazel, conductor
- Wolfgang Stresemann, intendant
- Rudolf Serkin, pianist
- Hans Heinz Stuckenschmidt, musicologist
- Dietrich Fischer-Dieskau, singer

and others.
