= Symphony No. 8 (Bruckner) =

Symphony by Anton Bruckner

- by Anton Bruckner
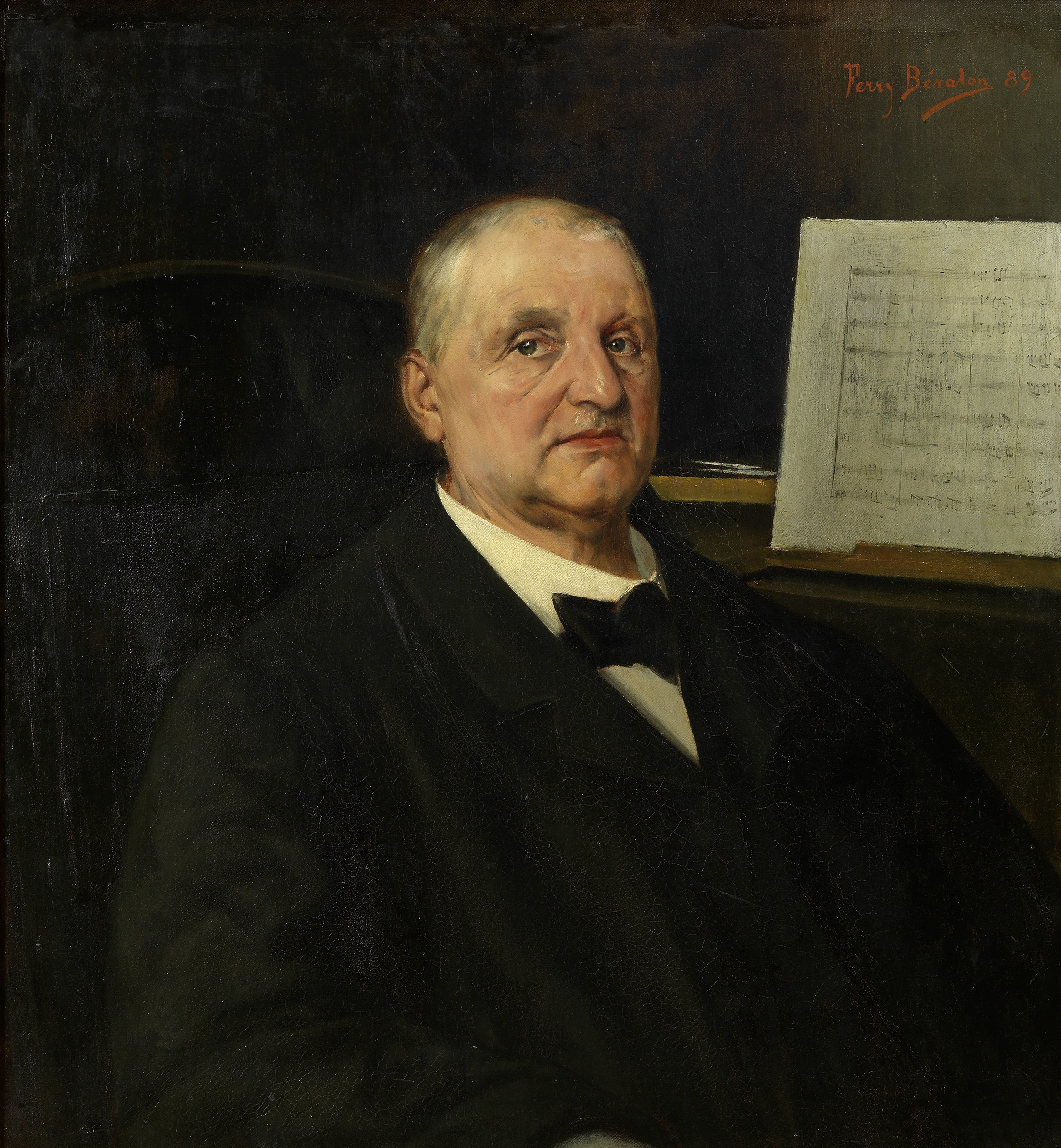
- Painting of Bruckner (1889)
- Other name: The Apocalyptic
- Key: C minor
- Catalogue: WAB 108
- Composed: 1884–92
- Dedication: Emperor Franz Joseph I of Austria
- Published: 1892
- Movements: 4

Premiere
- Date: 18 December 1892
- Location: Musikverein, Vienna
- Conductor: Hans Richter
- Performers: Vienna Philharmonic

Anton Bruckner's Symphony No. 8 in C minor, WAB 108, is the last symphony he completed, and is dedicated to Emperor Franz Joseph I of Austria. It exists in two major versions of 1887 and 1890. It was premiered under conductor Hans Richter in 1892 at the Musikverein, Vienna.

This symphony is sometimes nicknamed The Apocalyptic, but this was not a name Bruckner gave to the work himself.

== Composition and publication ==
Bruckner began work on the Eighth Symphony in July 1884. Working mainly during the summer vacations from his duties at the University of Vienna and the Vienna Conservatory, the composer had all four movements completed in draft form by August 1885. The orchestration of the work took Bruckner until April 1887 to complete; during this stage of composition, the order of the inner movements was reversed, leaving the Scherzo second and the Adagio as the third movement.

In September 1887, Bruckner had the score copied and sent to conductor Hermann Levi. Levi was one of Bruckner's closest collaborators, having given a performance of the Symphony No. 7 in Munich that was "the greatest triumph Bruckner had yet experienced". He had also arranged for Bruckner's career to be supported in other ways, including financial assistance from the nobility, and an honorary doctorate from the University of Vienna. However the conductor wrote back to Bruckner that:

I find it impossible to perform the Eighth in its current form. I just can't make it my own! As much as the themes are magnificent and direct, their working-out seems to me dubious; indeed, I consider the orchestration quite impossible... Don't lose your courage, take another look at your work, talk it over with your friends, with Schalk, maybe a reworking can achieve something.

By January 1888, Bruckner had come to agree with Levi that the symphony would benefit from further work. Early work of revision was carried out in the first movement and the Scherzo, expressed as pencil notations in their score. A distinct version of the Adagio – now called the "intermediate Adagio" or "Adagio of 1888" – was also retrieved and edited in 2004 by Dermot Gault and Takanobu Kawasaki. Thereafter, Bruckner concentrated on the new versions of the Fourth and Third. He began work on the final version of the Adagio in March 1889 and completed the new version of the symphony in March 1890.

Once the new version was completed, the composer wrote to Emperor Franz Josef I for permission to dedicate the symphony to him. The emperor accepted Bruckner's request and also offered to help pay for the work's publication. Bruckner had some trouble finding a publisher for the work, but in late 1890 the Haslinger-Schlesinger-Lienau company agreed to undertake publication. Bruckner's associates Josef Schalk and Max von Oberleithner assisted with the publication process: Schalk prepared the musical text to be sent to the printer while Oberleithner corrected the proofs and also provided financial support. The symphony was eventually published in March 1892. It was the only one of Bruckner's symphonies to be published before its first performance.

== Premiere and reception ==
By the time the 1890 revision was complete, Levi was no longer conducting concerts in Munich. As a result, he recommended that his protege Felix Weingartner, Kapellmeister of Mannheim, lead the first performance of the symphony. The premiere was twice scheduled to occur under the young conductor's direction during 1891, but each time Weingartner substituted another work at the last minute. Eventually the conductor told Bruckner that he was unable to undertake the performance because he was about to take up a new position at the Berlin Opera. However, Weingartner admitted, in a letter to Levi, that the real reason he was unable to perform the symphony was because the work was too difficult and he did not have enough rehearsal time: in particular, the Wagner tuba players in his orchestra did not have enough experience to cope with their parts.

After a Munich performance by Levi was cancelled because of a feared outbreak of cholera, Bruckner focused his efforts on securing a Vienna premiere for the symphony. At last Hans Richter, subscription conductor of the Vienna Philharmonic, agreed to conduct the work. The first performance took place on 18 December 1892. Although some of the more conservative members of the audience left at the end of each movement, many of Bruckner's supporters were also present, including Hugo Wolf and Johann Strauss.

The well known critic Eduard Hanslick left after the slow movement. His review described the symphony as "interesting in detail, but strange as a whole, indeed repellent. The peculiarity of this work consists, to put it briefly, in importing Wagner's dramatic style into the symphony." (Korstvedt points out that this was less negative than Hanslick's reviews of Bruckner's earlier symphonies.) There were also many positive reviews from Bruckner's admirers. One anonymous writer described the symphony as "the crown of music in our time". Hugo Wolf wrote to a friend that the symphony was "the work of a giant" that "surpasses the other symphonies of the master in intellectual scope, awesomeness, and greatness".

The symphony was slow to enter the orchestral repertoire. Only two further performances occurred during Bruckner's lifetime. The American premiere did not take place until 1909, while the symphony had to wait until 1929 for its first London performance.

== Description ==
The symphony has four movements. The total duration varies by performance and the edition of the score used, but is typically around 80 minutes, thus vying with the 5th as the composer's longest. In the first version (1887) they are:

1. Allegro moderato (C minor)
2. Scherzo: Allegro moderato — Trio: Allegro moderato (C minor → C major, Trio in A♭ major)
3. Adagio: Feierlich langsam, doch nicht schleppend (D♭ major)
4. Finale: Feierlich, nicht schnell (C minor → C major)

In the second version (1890 “apocalyptic”) they are:

1. Allegro moderato (C minor)
2. Scherzo: Allegro moderato — Trio: Langsam (C minor → C major, Trio in A♭ major)
3. Adagio: Feierlich langsam, doch nicht schleppend (D♭ major)
4. Finale: Feierlich, nicht schnell (C minor → C major)

=== First movement ===
The symphony begins in a tonally ambiguous manner with a theme rhythmically reminiscent of the main theme of the first movement of Beethoven's Symphony No. 9 in D minor and of the March in D minor of 1862. According to theorist Heinrich Schenker this passage is "like the beginning of the world."

A more song-like second subject group uses the Bruckner rhythm:

The third subject group, which is strikingly dissonant, forms a smooth transition to the development:

In structure, the opening movement is therefore a typically Brucknerian three-subject sonata form, though handled with more panache than in his previous works. The development was substantially refined in 1890. In both versions, this section of the movement contains a massive, augmented three-part statement of the main theme, impressively given on full orchestra in combination with the Bruckner rhythm of the second subject group. This combination of the main two themes of the exposition rises pitch-wise by a third until the orchestra drops away, leaving a single flute accompanied by a timpano.

In the recapitulation, the third theme leads to a great climax for the entire orchestra, in which the bare rhythm of the main theme is dominant:

This suddenly breaks off, leaving just the trumpets and three of the horns hammering out the rhythm, timpani thundering beneath. When the strings and woodwinds rejoin, it is in a very dejected mood. At this juncture the two versions differ significantly. In the 1887 version, this solemn passage leads to what many consider an unconvincingly premature victory coda, which sounds the main theme in C major. For the 1890 version, the triumphant ending was cut, and the despondent passage extended by a few bars to form a pianissimo coda in itself (thus becoming the only instance of a first movement ending softly in Bruckner's symphonic œuvre). This quiet, sombre ending is for low winds and low strings in a thoroughly bleak C minor, that remembers the music at the corresponding spot in the Symphony in F Minor. There is no doubt from contemporary letters of Bruckner that it represented death in some way.

It has been suggested by some scholars that the coda was inspired by the climax of the Dutchman's monologue in Wagner's Der fliegende Hollander, with the words, "Ihr Welten endet euren Lauf, ewige Vernichtung, nimm mich auf!".

=== Second movement ===
The five-note Deutscher Michel theme, accompanied by tremolo figures in the upper strings, is a reminiscence of the Credo of the Mass in E minor:

The main part of the Scherzo is fundamentally the same in both versions, though somewhat more repetitive in the first version. The orchestration and dynamics are more refined in the second version, helping to give the movement a rich and original sound. The Trios, however, are quite different: the 1890 version was rewritten as an adumbration of the ensuing Adagio movement, featuring the harps, and the tempo was slowed down:

This Scherzo is Bruckner's largest, lasting around 14 or 15 minutes in most performances.

=== Third movement ===
The main difference between versions is at the climax, for which in the 1887 version Bruckner managed to insert six cymbal clashes. He must have thought that excessive, as he pared it down to two in the 1890 version. The key of this climax was also altered from C major in 1887 to E♭ major in 1890. The coda of this movement is recalled in the coda of the Adagio of the Ninth Symphony.

This Adagio differs from those in other symphonies by the composer in that the second thematic group is not presented in a more flowing tempo. The two themes are, first, a recollection of the slow movement of Schubert's Wanderer Fantasie for Pianoforte and an answering descending passage, both over throbbing, richly scored strings; and, secondly, a tonally unstable passage radiant with ecstasy. The structure and scale of the Adagio as it develops these themes is grander than any of Bruckner's previous slow movements.

The movement opens in an unusual way; while it is in 4/4 time, the string accompaniment is made up of a mix of uneven triplets and eighth notes. Simon Rattle describes this as a "fascinating rhythmic hall of mirrors."

This eventually leads to a great chorale in the strings that starts in G♭ major but leads to F major:

The second part of the movement begins with a cello melody:

The Adagio is the most controversial of all the movements in terms of different versions. For example, Robert Haas inserted one quiet, solemn passage in his edition of the 1890 score which restored a cut between two loud passages (before the main climax of the movement), whereas in the Leopold Nowak edition these two loud passages are joined. This difference greatly affects the impression given to the listener for this section of the movement as it heads towards the great E♭ major climax. The 1890 Adagio, in both the edition of Robert Haas and that of Leopold Nowak, remains shorter than the 1887 original.

=== Fourth movement ===
Beginning belligerently (by Bruckner's standards), this movement reaches a triumphant conclusion using themes (or at least rhythmic impressions of these) from all four movements. The form of this movement is complex, derived from a three-subject sonata structure but, like the opening movement of Symphony No. 7, highly individualised. The scale and complexity of this movement are both on a different level from that in the opening of the Seventh Symphony, however, not least in that this movement must synthesise the entire symphony (as it reworks old ideas and new ones into a coherent whole), and forms what must be a satisfactory conclusion for the whole work.

The opening theme is a powerful chorale, originally given over a march, in which the rhythmic thundering of the timpani recalls certain passages in the opening movement:

The second subject, a song theme, is remarkable in that it recollects not only its counterpart in the first movement but also the Adagio:

The third subject is a march theme, which is a direct reworking of the introduction to the third subject group of the opening movement:

In the recapitulation, this third theme is presented as a fugue which leads to the solemn coda and the splendid, bright finish to the symphony.

The development presents these three themes and other elements in ways which recollect earlier parts of the symphony, both episodically and in simultaneously parallel combinations. The thematic treatment is subtle and counterpoint is frequently used in the presentation of themes. It therefore seems natural that such a synthesis concludes by contrapuntally combining all the main themes of the symphony: the coda begins in a solemn C minor in which the opening theme of the Finale reaches a powerful climax. This is answered quietly by the woodwind giving out the same theme, then more optimistically by the full orchestra, from which, in a flurry of trumpets and timpani, the Scherzo theme heralds a remarkably succinct combination of all the themes in C major:

For all its grandeur, the ending is remarkably concise, and the perorations are more terse than those of, say, Bruckner's own Symphony No. 5 in B♭ major.

== Versions ==
Two complete autograph manuscripts of the symphony exist, dating from 1887 and 1890 respectively. More sketches exist from all phases of work on this symphony than for most of Bruckner's works. For example, thanks to the sketches, we can see the evolution of the opening theme. Part scores show that the tonal ambiguity of the symphony's opening was not how Bruckner originally envisaged the main theme: the rhythm was to fit an arpeggiated contour in C minor. The final opening is much less defined and hovers in more of a B♭ major region, though it suggests several keys.

=== 1887 version ===
This was Bruckner's first version of the symphony, but was not published until 1972 in an edition edited by Leopold Nowak.

There are enormous variants in orchestration, harmony, voice leading and motivic treatment between the two versions. In some sections one can almost speak of two different pieces, rather than two versions of the same work.

Some significant differences from the more familiar later versions include a loud ending to the first movement and a different tonality for the climax of the slow movement. It is also notably longer than the 1890 version, and has a different instrumentation (the most significant consistent difference being that the 1890 version has triple rather than double woodwind throughout the first three movements). The double woodwind of the 1887 version gives a somewhat more austere character to the overall sound of the work. Some scholars support this version of the symphony. Bryan Gilliam, for example, argues that the later version (from 1890) is shorter and smoother, and is hence a dubious concession to the Brahms-loving bourgeoisie of the time.

The 1887 version was premiered by Hans-Hubert Schönzeler for the BBC in 1973, and has thereafter been recorded by Dennis Russell Davies, Vladimir Fedoseyev, Eliahu Inbal, Georg Tintner, Michael Gielen, Kent Nagano, Simone Young, Franz Welser-Möst and Fabio Luisi.

A digitalisation of the North-American premiere of the 1887 version by Tintner with the National Youth Orchestra of Canada, Kingston, Ontario (Canada), 31 August 1982 (LP: Jubal 5003/4, 1982), and of a 2009 live performance by Gennadi Rozhdestvensky with the Bolshoi Orchestra can be heard on John Berky's website.

The new edition by Paul Hawkshaw has been premiered by Peter Oundjian with the Yale Symphony Orchestra on 27 October 2017.

=== Intermediate versions ===
A copy of an intermediate version of the Adagio with an estimated date of 1888 exists in the Austrian National Library. This Adagio, which already requires triple woodwind, has been edited by Dermot Gault and Takanobu Kawasaki and recorded by Akira Naito with the Tokyo New City Orchestra. A MIDI version is also available.
Intermediate versions of the other movements have been edited by William Carragan and performed by Gerd Schaller.

This account of the Eighth was founded on individual, possibly non-contemporaneous manuscripts rather than one complete copy. … Thus it will always have to be regarded as experimental, not on the same editorial level as the firmly-established manuscript versions of 1887 and 1890 and the printed version of 1892. But in it we have a fascinating view of the work-in-progress of Bruckner the eternal reviser, looking for the most expressive realization of his lofty thoughts and melodic inspiration.

=== 1890 version ===
Some scholars such as Deryck Cooke and Robert Haas have suggested that the 1890 revision was the product of Bruckner's insecurity and pressure from his colleagues such as Josef Schalk. Cooke even referred to it as the "Bruckner-Schalk revision". Against this, Leopold Nowak pointed out that there is no evidence of handwriting in the 1890 manuscript other than Bruckner's own; according to testimony of his friends and associates, the composer was resistant to interference. The scoring is fuller and more grandiloquent than in 1887, with subtler textures and harmonies in the woodwind in particular, allowed for by the increased size of this section of the orchestra. The 1890 version was published in 1955 as edited by Nowak.

== Editions ==
=== First edition (1892) ===
This was the first publication of the symphony, and was also the version used at the first performance. It contains some relatively minor changes from the 1890 manuscript, the most notable being a six-bar cut and a two-bar repeated passage in the Finale. The alterations were made by Joseph Schalk and Max von Oberleithner, almost certainly without Bruckner's direct involvement, but were probably approved by the composer before publication. Korstvedt writes that "while the 1892 edition may not be "pure Bruckner" – whatever that might be – to all appearances Bruckner authorized it, and for that reason it needs to be taken seriously." This edition is available in complete recordings by Wilhelm Furtwängler, Hans Knappertsbusch, Josef Krips, William Steinberg, George Szell, Bruno Walter and Takeo Noguchi. Serge Koussevitzky also used this edition in his severely cut broadcast performance of 1947; this performance, which has been preserved on disc, amounts to a wholly new "edition".

=== Haas’s "mixed" edition ===
Robert Haas published his edition of the Eighth Symphony in 1939. He based it on the 1890 autograph but included passages from 1887 that had been changed or omitted. The Gesamtausgabe describes it as a "Mischform", or mixed form. Nevertheless, it remains a beloved and, perhaps, the most frequently played and recorded edition of the work.

Haas argued that Levi's comments were a crippling blow to Bruckner's artistic confidence, even leading him to "entertain suicidal notions", although Haas had no evidence for this. This led, Haas maintained, to Bruckner's three-year effort to revise the Eighth Symphony and many of his earlier works. This line of thought supports Haas' editorial methods. Haas took what he admired from Bruckner's different versions and rolled them into his own version. He justified the rejection of various features of Bruckner's 1890 revision on biographical grounds: they are the ideas of a Bruckner who mistrusted his own judgment, and therefore non-Brucknerian.

The most significant omissions that Bruckner made (and therefore of Haas's restorations) are in the Adagio and Finale of the work. In addition, Haas inserted into the finale a transitional passage of eight bars from a sketch found in the library of the Kremsmünster Abbey (A-KR C56-14e1), discarding five bars of Bruckner's own revision. Korstvedt has described these interventions as "exceed[ing] reasonable limits of scholarly responsibility".

Despite its dubious scholarship, Haas's edition has proved enduringly popular: conductors such as Herbert von Karajan, Bernard Haitink and Günter Wand continued to use it even after the Nowak/1890 edition was published, while noted Bruckner conductor Georg Tintner has written that the Haas edition is "the best" version of the symphony and referred to Haas himself as "brilliant". On the other hand, Eugen Jochum used Haas's edition for his first recording, made in 1949, before Nowak published his edition, and Nowak's for his subsequent recordings, while Wilhelm Furtwängler, despite having given the premiere of the Haas score, reverted to the 1892 edition in his final years.

The controversy over the Haas edition centers on the fact that its musical text was a fabrication of the editor never approved by Bruckner himself. In particular, Nowak, who succeeded Haas as principal editor of the Bruckner complete works, argued that there is little evidence for the psychological breakdown that Haas claimed Bruckner suffered upon Levi's rejection of the work. Bruckner's letters at the time suggest that he was frustrated by Levi's judgment (dismissing Levi as having a "hard time grasping things") and psychologically healthy. Bruckner's revisions, according to this view, are the result of his artistic perfectionism. Nowak therefore rejected Haas's approach by sticking closely to Bruckner's autograph scores.

=== Nowak’s two editions ===
As noted above, under the discussion of versions, Nowak left in 1955 an edition of the 1890 version and in 1972 an edition of the 1887 version.

=== Hawkshaw's new edition ===
Both versions will be published in the new Collected Edition. The new edition of the 1887 version corrects enough mistakes in the older print. Nevertheless, it is still very much the same score.

== Instrumentation ==
The 1887 version is scored for three flutes, a piccolo, three oboes, three clarinets, three bassoons, eight horns, three trumpets, three trombones, four Wagner tubas, one contrabass tuba, timpani, cymbals, triangle, three harps, and strings. The third part of each woodwind only appear in the Finale, while the third bassoon also doubles as contrabassoon in the Finale. Horns 5 to 8 also only appear in the Finale.
The 1890 version deletes the piccolo part, and extends the triple woodwinds and calls for eight horns on all four movements. Horns 5 to 8 replace the Wagner tubas in most of the first and third movements, doubling as Wagner tubas at some points of the symphony.
This is the only symphony where Bruckner employs the harp. This was, in total, the largest orchestra Bruckner ever used (since the Ninth Symphony, which uses an otherwise identical orchestra, does not require harps and percussion other than timpani).

== Programme ==
In an 1891 letter to conductor Felix Weingartner, Bruckner gave extramusical associations to several parts of the symphony:

In the first movement, the trumpet and horn passage based on the rhythm of the [main] theme in the Todesverkündigung [the annunciation of death], which gradually grows stronger, and finally emerges very strongly. At the end: surrender.

Scherzo: Main theme – named deutscher Michel. In the second part, the fellow wants to sleep, and in his dreamy state cannot find his tune: finally, he plaintively turns back.

Finale: At the time our Emperor received the visit of the Czars at Olmütz; (Note: According to Korstvedt p. 52, Bruckner was mistaken about the location of this meeting, which took place between Franz Joseph I of Austria, Tsar Alexander III of Russia, and Kaiser Wilhelm I of Germany at Skierniewice in September 1884.) thus, strings: the Cossacks; brass: military music; trumpets: fanfares, as the Majesties meet. In closing, all themes … thus as deutscher Michel arrives home from his journey, everything is already gloriously brilliant. In the Finale there is also the death march and then (brass) transfiguration.

Bruckner's associates report other comments that the composer is said to have made about the symphony. The coda to the first movement is "how it is when one is on his deathbed, and opposite hangs a clock, which, while his life comes to an end, beats on ever steadily: tick, tock, tick, tock" while in the slow movement "I have gazed too deeply into a maiden's eyes".

In an unsigned programme note at the 1892 first performance Joseph Schalk elaborated Bruckner's program, adding references to Greek mythology (Aeschylus's Prometheus, Zeus or Cronus, etc.) mixed with a few Christian references such as the Archangel Michael.

== Discography ==
Over the recorded lifetime of this symphony, significantly different approaches have been taken, including tempo choices and the choice of score.

Wilhelm Furtwängler, in a live performance with the Vienna Philharmonic in 1944 used a modified Haas edition.

On 29 September 1944, the Preussische Staatskapelle Berlin, conducted by Herbert von Karajan, recorded the last three movements of the 8th Symphony with the finale in experimental stereophonic sound. In his interpretation Karajan kept strict metre whereas "recordings from the 1940s … typically present this passage [the reprise of the third subject group in the finale] as a grand accelerando-rallentando, with a tempo increase of as much as 20 percent," while Karajan's recording "is a notable exception."

The first commercial recording of the complete symphony was made by Eugen Jochum with the Hamburg State Philharmonic Orchestra in 1949 for Deutsche Grammophon. Jochum later recorded it in studio with the Berlin Philharmonic in 1964 for Deutsche Grammophon, and in 1976 with the Dresden Staatskapelle for EMI using the Nowak 1890 edition both times. Karl Böhm, in a studio recording with the Vienna Philharmonic in 1976 for Deutsche Grammophon used the Nowak 1890 edition, but with one Haas passage in the finale.

In the last two decades of the 20th century, recordings tended to "set a broader basic tempo, … abstain from dramatic tempo fluctuations – especially increases – and place great store by fullness of tone, precise ensemble, and textural clarity."

Typically, this work lasts about 80 minutes, although there are performances running as long as 103 minutes (Sergiu Celibidache's interpretation). Herbert von Karajan and the aforementioned Günter Wand each recorded the Haas hybrid version more than once. After Eliahu Inbal recorded the 1887 version for the first time, other conductors have followed. Takashi Asahina has recorded a disc comparing excerpts from the Haas and Nowak editions.

=== 1887 version ===
==== Nowak edition (1972) ====
Some conductors preferred to record the first version of the symphony:

- Hans-Hubert Schönzeler with Bournemouth Symphony Orchestra – Lanta Fe LF-432, 1973 (world premiere)
- Eliahu Inbal recorded it several times, the first time with the Frankfurt Radio Symphony – Teldec CD 243791, 1982
- Georg Tintner with the National Youth Orchestra of Canada – LP Jubal LP 5003/4, 1982, and the National Symphony Orchestra of Ireland – Naxos 8.554215/6, 1996
- Michael Gielen with the SWR Symphony Orchestra Baden-Baden and Freiburg – SWR Music SWR 19014 CD, 2007
- Simone Young with the Hamburg Philharmonic Orchestra – SACD Oehms Classics OC 638, 2008
- Franz Welser-Möst with Cleveland Orchestra – DVD Arthaus Musik 101581, 2010

A digitisation of the North American premiere of the 1887 version by Georg Tintner with the National Youth Orchestra of Canada and a performance by Gennady Rozhdestvensky with the Bolshoi Theatre Orchestra (March 10, 2009) can be heard on John Berky's website.

==== Hawkshaw Edition (2014) ====
- Markus Poschner with the Bruckner Orchestra Linz – Capriccio LC 80087, 2023

=== 1888 intermediate version, Gault & Kawasaki and Carragan ===
- Akira Naito with the Tokyo New City Orchestra (Adagio 1888; 1890 version, Nowak edition, for the other three movements) – Delta Classics DCCA-0003, 2004
- Gerd Schaller with the Philharmonie Festiva Orchestra – Profil PH13027, Live 2012

=== 1890 version ===
==== Haas "mixed version" (1939) ====
The majority of recordings are based on this edition. Some conductors, as Wilhelm Furtwängler, Herbert von Karajan and Günter Wand have recorded it several times.

==== Nowak critical edition (1955) ====
Other conductors, who have also recorded this symphony several times, have preferred Nowak, including:

- Eugen Jochum recorded the work multiple times. His first recording, 1949, with the Hamburg State Philharmonic Orchestra was based on the Haas edition, but his following recordings were all based on the Nowak edition.
- From Sergiu Celibidache, there are also several recordings. The last one, with the Munich Philharmonic Orchestra, exceeded in duration all other available recordings (105 minutes, 20 more than average).
- Karl Böhm has also recorded it many times, notably with the Vienna Philharmonic and the Tonhalle-Orchester Zürich.
- George Szell conducted the 1892 edition in radio recordings prior to the publication of the 1890 Nowak version, then switched to it for a 1968 live radio recording with the Vienna Philharmonic and 1969 studio recording with the Cleveland Orchestra.

=== 1892 Version, Schalk ===
Some conductors have based their recordings on the first printed edition:

- Bruno Walter with the Philharmonic Society of New York – Andromeda ANDRCD 9092, 1941
- Hans Knappertsbusch with the Berlin Philharmonic Orchestra – Adagio Classics 4004, 1951
- George Szell with the Concertgebouw Orchestra – Audiophile Classics 101.556, 1951
- Volkmar Andreae with the Vienna Symphonic Orchestra – Box set Music and Arts 1227, 1953
- William Steinberg with the Boston Symphonic Orchestra – Vibrato 2VLL-150, 1962
- Josef Krips with the Vienna Symphonic Orchestra – Vibrato 2VLL-150, 1971

== Bibliography ==
- Anton Bruckner, Sämtliche Werke, Kritische Gesamtausgabe – Band 8: VIII. Symphonie c-Moll (Originalfassung), Musikwissenschaftlicher Verlag, Robert Haas (Editor), Leipzig, 1939
- Anton Bruckner: Sämtliche Werke: Band VIII: VIII. Symphonie c-Moll, Musikwissenschaftlicher Verlag der Internationalen Bruckner-Gesellschaft, Vienna
  - VIII/1: 1. Fassung 1887, Leopold Nowak (Editor), 1972/1992
  - VIII/2: 2. Fassung 1890, Leopold Nowak (Editor), 1955/1994
- — (2022). Benjamin M Korstvedt (ed.). Neue Anton Bruckner Gesamtausgabe: Band VIII/1: Symphonie Nr.8 in c-Moll: Erste Fassung. Vienna: Musikwissenschaftlicher Verlag der Internationalen Bruckner-Gesellschaft.
- Korstvedt, Benjamin M. (2000). Bruckner: Symphony No. 8. Cambridge, UK; New York: Cambridge University Press. ISBN 0-521-63537-3.
