= Bruckner rhythm =

Common rhythm in Anton Bruckner's symphonic works

The Bruckner rhythm is a 2 + 3 (duplet + triplet) or 3 + 2 rhythm in Anton Bruckner's symphonic music, where it occurs prevalently, and in many different ways.

One example is in the main theme of the first movement of Symphony No. 4, from bars 43 forward:

Bruckner also used the rhythm with a single pitch repeated, and this is the only way it occurs in Symphony No. 2 (e.g., bars 20 and 122). In Symphony No. 6, the Bruckner rhythm occurs to a much greater extent than in previous works, in several parts at slightly different times. At first it occurs as a string ostinato high in the violins' range against a melody of different rhythm in the cellos (bar 3), while at bars 195–209 it serves to articulate hexatonic cycle block chords. The rhythm occurs in somewhat more "manageable" form in the secondary theme group of Symphony No. 8, where it usually occurs in the same way in all the parts.

The Bruckner rhythm also occurs in the works of other composers, such as in Howard Hanson's Romantic Symphony, where it occurs mostly in the horns' and trumpets' parts.
