= List of masses by Anton Bruckner =

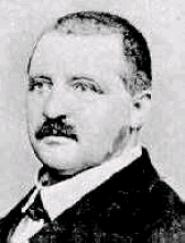
Anton Bruckner, c. 1860

Anton Bruckner was a devoutly religious man, and composed numerous sacred works. Among these are seven Masses, two requiems, and sketches for two additional Masses and one requiem.

The three early Masses, composed between 1842 and 1844 during Bruckner's stay in Windhaag and Kronstorf, were short Austrian Landmessen (country Masses) for use in local churches. The lost Requiem for men's choir and organ, composed in 1845, the Requiem in D minor, composed in 1849, and the Missa solemnis, composed in 1854, were composed during Bruckner's stay in Sankt Florian. The three Masses, Mass No. 1 in D minor, Mass No. 2 in E minor and Mass No. 3 in F minor, which Bruckner composed after eight years of study with Simon Sechter and Otto Kitzler, are the most advanced and elaborate of these compositions.

== Windhaag and Kronstorf ==
During his stay as a schoolteacher's assistant in Windhaag (3 October 1841 – 23 January 1843) and Kronstorf (23 January 1843 – 23 September 1845), Bruckner composed three Landmessen: the Windhaager Messe, the Kronstorfer Messe and the Messe für den Gründonnerstag. These Masses were intentionally simple, because they were intended for the meagre resources of the local village churches.

- The Windhaager Messe in C major (WAB 25) is a Choral-Messe for alto soloist, two horns and organ, which Bruckner composed in 1842 during his stay in Windhaag.
- The Kronstorfer Messe (WAB 146) in D minor is a Missa brevis for mixed choir a cappella, which Bruckner composed in 1843–1844 during his next stay in Kronstorf.
- The Messe für den Gründonnerstag (WAB 9) in F major is another Missa brevis for mixed choir a cappella, which Bruckner composed in 1844 during his stay in Kronstorf. Extra Kyrie and Gloria, composed in 1845, are lost.

During this period (c. 1845) Bruckner also composed a 17-bar sketch for the Kyrie in G minor of a Missa pro Quadragesima (Mass for Lent) for mixed choir, three trombones and organ (WAB 140).

These compositions are included in Volume XXI of the Gesamtausgabe.

== Sankt Florian ==
Between 23 September 1845 and 24 December 1855, during his stay as organist in Sankt Florian, Bruckner composed a lost requiem, the Requiem in D minor and the Missa solemnis.

- Requiem (WAB 133), for men's choir and organ, a lost work composed in 1845 for the funeral of Johann Nepomuk Deschl.
- Requiem (WAB 39) in D minor, for mixed choir, soloists, three trombones, one horn, strings and organ, composed in 1849 for the death anniversary of Franz Sailer.
- Missa solemnis (WAB 29) in B♭ minor, for mixed choir, soloists, orchestra and organ, composed in 1854 for Friedrich Mayer's installation.

In c. 1846 Bruckner also composed a 58-bar sketch for the Kyrie of another Mass in E♭ major (WAB 139), intended for mixed choir, 2 oboes, 3 trombones, strings and organ. The similarity to Mozart's early Masses was possibly the reason why Bruckner broke off the composition of the Mass. A recording of the sketch using notation software can be heard on John Berky's website.

== Linz ==
In the 1860s, after the end of Sechter's and Kitzler's tuition, Bruckner composed successively the three numbered Masses, No.1 in D minor, No. 2 in E minor and No. 3 in F minor.

- The Mass No. 1 (WAB 26), in D minor, composed in 1864, is scored for soloists, mixed choir, organ and orchestra.
- The Mass No. 2 (WAB 27), in E minor, composed in 1866 to celebrate the accomplishment of the construction of the Votive Chapel of the new cathedral of Linz, is scored for eight-voice mixed choir and a small group of wind instruments.
- The Mass No. 3 (WAB 28), in F minor, composed in 1868 and intended for a performance in the Hofkapelle, is scored for soloists, mixed choir, organ ad libitum and orchestra. This Mass, which was clearly meant for concert, rather than liturgical performance, is the only one of Bruckner's Masses in which the first lines of the Gloria and of the Credo are set to music. The composition of the Mass in F minor may have been influenced by Schubert's late Mass No. 5 and Mass No. 6.

== Vienna ==
In 1875, during his stay in Vienna, Bruckner drafted an 18-bar sketch for the Introit of another requiem in D minor (WAB 141). The bass-ostinato of the fragment is similar to that of the "nullified" Symphony in D minor and the Te Deum.
