= Symphony No. 2 (Hanson) =

Musical work; symphony in three movements composed by Howard Hanson

The Symphony No. 2 in D♭ major, Op. 30, W45, "Romantic", was written by Howard Hanson on commission from Serge Koussevitzky for the 50th anniversary of the Boston Symphony Orchestra in 1930, and published by Carl Fischer Music.

== Instrumentation ==
The symphony was written for a standard orchestra consisting of piccolo, 2 flutes, 2 oboes, English horn, 2 clarinets in B♭, 2 bassoons, contrabassoon, 4 horns in F, 3 trumpets in C, 3 trombones, tuba, timpani, snare drum, bass drum, cymbals, harp, and strings.

== Structure ==
The symphony is in three movements, with much thematic material shared among the movements.

1. Adagio ( = 50) — Allegro moderato ( = 100) — Lento ( = 56) molto espressivo — Piu mosso — Meno mosso ( = 72) — Tranquillo — Molto piu mosso ( = 112) — Animato — Molto meno mosso ( =80) — Animato ( = 112) — Meno mosso ( = 96) — Ancora meno mosso — Molto meno mosso
2. Andante con tenerezza
3. Allegro con brio — Molto meno mosso — Piu mosso — Animato — Largamente

The "lyrical, haunting second theme" of the first movement has become known as the "Interlochen Theme," as it is performed at the conclusion of most public performances at the Interlochen Arts Camp; it is seldom performed or mentioned at the Interlochen Arts Academy. It is a tradition at the arts camp for the concertmaster, a student, to break the baton, signaling the end of camp. It reappears "with greater emphasis" in the following two movements. The slow movement was arranged for concert band by Norman Goldberg and in this form was also published by Carl Fischer.

Hanson considered himself a "perfect fifth composer" or a "major third composer," but in this symphony, it is the perfect fourth "that plays a prominent part throughout the symphony in both melody and harmony." Despite the abundance of triplets, the Bruckner rhythm occurs only in a few spots, mainly in the horns' and trumpets' parts; the others are in the timpani in the first movement, and at the end of a longer rhythmical motif in the finale.

== Performances ==
The symphony was premiered by Koussevitzky conducting the Boston Symphony Orchestra on November 28, 1930. Soon after Arturo Toscanini played it with the New York Philharmonic. Hanson himself conducted and recorded the work with the Eastman-Rochester Symphony Orchestra. Other conductors of the symphony include Charles Gerhardt, Erich Kunzel, Sir Neville Marriner, Gerard Schwarz, David Montgomery and Leonard Slatkin.

== Reception ==
While Hanson is deemed to have broken new ground in the symphony, he "produced a popular concert work which is the epitome of the twentieth-century symphony that could have been written by an American." Virgil Thomson, a contemporary of Hanson, opined of Hanson's music in general that "I have never yet found in any work of his a single phrase or turn of harmony that did not sound familiar," and of the symphony specifically, "it is as standardized in expression as it is eclectic in style. Not a surprise from beginning to end, nor any adventure."

Hanson was displeased that the theme was used for the closing credits of Alien without his permission but decided not to fight it in court. More positively, John Williams used the symphony as a model for his music for E.T.

== Recordings ==
Hanson himself conducted the Eastman-Rochester Orchestra in a 1939 RCA Victor recording of the symphony. Then, in 1958, he made a stereo recording with the same orchestra of the symphony for Mercury Records, which was later reissued on CD and has remained in catalogues for many years.

Hanson's Second Symphony is one of the most-recorded twentieth century American symphonies, being also recorded by the National Philharmonic Orchestra conducted by Charles Gerhardt (RCA, then Chesky), the Seattle Symphony under Gerard Schwarz (Delos, then Naxos), the Saint Louis Symphony Orchestra conducted by Leonard Slatkin (EMI), the Cincinnati Pops Orchestra under Erich Kunzel and the Jena Philharmonic Orchestra under David Montgomery (Arte Nova), and a third recording by the composer, conducting the Mormon Youth Symphony Orchestra and recorded at the Salt Lake Tabernacle, Utah in 1972 (Citadel Records). Hanson also included an extended version of the symphony's main theme (heard in the first and last movements) in a recording with the World Youth Symphony, made at a concert at Interlochen, Michigan in 1977 (Citadel).

The symphony is one of the very few American works that Arturo Toscanini conducted when he was music director of the New York Philharmonic Orchestra; however, Toscanini did not record the music, even during the many years he led the NBC Symphony Orchestra.

== Sources ==
- Butterworth (1998) Neil. Surrey The American Symphony Ashgate
- John Canarina, "The American Symphony", A Guide to the Symphony, ed. Robert Layton. Oxford: Oxford University Press (1993): 406 - 407
- Cohen (2004) Allen. Westport, Connecticut Howard Hanson in Theory and Practice Praeger
- Inoue, Satsuki (1993). Denon CO-75284 Thompson (translator) Robin. Nippon Columbia Co. Ltd. Japan
- Karlin (1994) Fred. New York Listening to the Movies: The Film Lover's Guide to Film Music Schirmer
- Perone (1993) James E. Westport, Connecticut Howard Hanson: A Bio-Bibliography Greenwood Press
- Steinberg (1998) Michael. Oxford The Symphony: A Listener's Guide Oxford University Press
