= Intermezzo in D minor (Bruckner) =

Musical composition by Anton Bruckner

- Viola quintet by Anton Bruckner
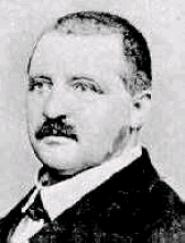
- The composer, c. 1860
- Catalogue: WAB 113
- Composed: 21 December 1879: Vienna
- Performed: 23 January 1904: Vienna

The Intermezzo in D minor (WAB 113) is an 1879 composition by the Austrian composer Anton Bruckner. Although it was intended to replace the scherzo of the String Quintet, that piece was instead performed in its original form; the Intermezzo was not publicly premiered until after the composer's death.

== History ==
Bruckner completed his String Quintet in 1879 for a group headed by Joseph Hellmesberger Sr. However, Hellmesberger found the work's "curious, elfin scherzo" to be too challenging for the group to perform. In response, Bruckner wrote an eight-minute Intermezzo, which was completed in Vienna on 21 December 1879. The Intermezzo (WAB 113) was in the same key (D minor) as the original scherzo and used the same trio section, but its tempo was slower and it was less technically challenging.

The Intermezzo was originally intended as a less difficult alternative to the scherzo of the Quintet. Nevertheless, in 1885, Hellmesberger decided to proceed with the original Quintet after it had been premiered in full by the Winkler Quartet.

The manuscript of the Intermezzo was retrieved in 1900—after Bruckner's death—from the collection of his pupil Josef Schalk. The Intermezzo, which became an independent work scored for string quintet, was premiered on 23 January 1904 in Vienna by the Fitzner Quartet during a concert of the Wiener Akademischer Wagner-Verein. There is no record of an earlier public performance.

The manuscript of the Intermezzo is stored in the archive of the Österreichische Nationalbibliothek. The Intermezzo was first published by Universal Edition in Vienna in 1913 (without its trio). It appeared in a complete critical edition in 1963, as appendix to the String Quintet, in Band XIII of the Gesamtausgabe edited by Leopold Nowak.

== Music ==
Intermezzo, Moderato in 3/4:

- Theme: bars 1–42
- Development: bars 43–90
- Reprise: bars 91–142

Trio, Langsamer in E-flat major:

- Theme: bars 1–8, with repeat
- Development: bars 9–32
- Reprise: bars 33–40

Intermezzo da capo al fine

(Translation) The Intermezzo exhibits globally a stronger tendency to impressionism with variegated harmonic tinges and displays in melody and rhythm ever and anon ländler-like traits. Some figures are taken from the Scherzo and there are also parallels with the Trio of the Third Symphony.

Der 'Intermezzo' zeigt insgesamt eine stärkere Tendenz zum „Stimmungsbild“ mit harmonisch vielfältigen Schattierungen und weist in Melodik und Rhythmus immer wieder ländlerartige Züge auf. Einige Figuren sind dem Scherzo entnommen, es finden sich auch Parallelen zum Trio der 'Dritten Symphonie'.

Although, as reviewer Wayne Reisig remarks, Bruckner "never wrote anything which could be termed 'pops' beyond the Austrian-German border", the Intermezzo might be considered in that genre: it is a "sunny little work saturated with the feel of the Tyrol". The piece was inspired by folk dances, particularly the ländler. Critic James Reel for the Arizona Daily Star described it as a "sometimes swaggering, sometimes hesitating minuet" that is reminiscent of Bruckner's orchestral writing.

== Selected discography ==
The Intermezzo is sometimes put as additional piece to recordings of the String Quintet. At the end of manuscript of the Intermezzo Bruckner wrote "Trio", by which he meant the Trio from the original Scherzo. Since the first edition of the Intermezzo was issued without the Trio, people thought that the Intermezzo had no Trio, and so some recordings are without Trio and reprise.

The first recording occurred in 1956:

- Vienna Konzerthaus Quartet, Ferdinand Stangler (second viola). Bruckner: Quintet for Strings in F Major; Intermezzo for String Quintet. LP: Amadeo AVRS 6030. Without Trio.

A selection among the about 15 other recordings:

=== Without Trio ===
- L'Archibudelli, Anton Bruckner: String Quintet. Intermezzo. Rondo. String Quartet. CD: Sony Classical Vivarte SK 66 251, 1994 – on historical instruments.
- Fine Arts Quartet, Gil Sharon (second viola). Bruckner: String Quintet in F Major / String Quartet in C Minor. CD: Naxos 8.570788, 2007.

=== Full performance ===
- Vienna Philharmonia Quintet. Bruckner – String Quintet in F major, Intermezzo in D minor for string quintet. LP: Decca STS 15400, 1974.
- Sonare Quartet, Vladimir Mendelssohn (second viola). String Quintet in F major / Intermezzo in D minor. CD: Claves CD 50-9006, 1990
- Melos Quartet, Enrique Santiago (second viola). Bruckner – Streichquintett F-Dur. CD: Harmonia Mundi HMC 901421, 1992
- Raphael Quartet, Prunella Pacey (second viola). Bruckner: String Quintet; Rondo; Intermezzo. CD: Globe 5078, 1992
- Vienna String Quintet, Bruckner: String Quintet in F, Intermezzo in D. CD: Camerata 30CM-399, 1994
- Leipzig String Quartet, Hartmut Rohde (second viola). Bach, Beethoven, Bruckner - Encores – CD: MDG Gold 307 1362-2, 2005.
- Fitzwilliam Quartet, James Boyd (second viola). Anton Bruckner: String Quintet / String Quartet. CD: Linn LC 11615, 2011 – on historical instruments
- Bartholdy Quintet, Bruckner – Zemlinsky String Quintets – CD: CAvi Music 8553348, 2013

== Sources ==
- Anton Bruckner: Sämtliche Werke: Band XIII/2: Streichquintett F-Dur / Intermezzo d-Moll, Musikwissenschaftlicher Verlag der Internationalen Bruckner-Gesellschaft, Leopold Nowak (Ed.), Vienna, 1963; revised edition by Gerold G. Gruber, 2007
- Cornelis van Zwol, Anton Bruckner 1824–1896 – Leven en werken, uitg. Thoth, Bussum, Netherlands, 2012. ISBN 978-90-6868-590-9
- Uwe Harten, Anton Bruckner. Ein Handbuch. Residenz Verlag, Salzburg, 1996. ISBN 3-7017-1030-9
