= Karl Pohlig =

German Bohemian conductor, cellist and pianist

- Born: February 10, 1858; Teplitz, Bohemia, Austrian Empire
- Died: June 17, 1928 (aged 70) Braunschweig, Germany
- Occupations: Conductor and musician
- Instruments: Cello and piano

Karl Pohlig (February 10, 1858 – June 17, 1928) was a German Bohemian conductor, cellist and pianist. A piano student of Hungarian composer Franz Liszt and assistant to Gustav Mahler at the Vienna Court Opera (now the Vienna State Opera), he went on to become the first conductor to perform the complete version of Bruckner's Symphony No. 6. In 1907, he was appointed as conductor of the Philadelphia Orchestra in Philadelphia, Pennsylvania.

== Early life ==
Born in Teplitz, Bohemia, Austrian Empire on February 10, 1858, Pohlig studied cello and piano in Weimar. A piano student of Franz Liszt, Pohlig also later taught piano in that city. In addition, Pohlig served as an assistant to Gustav Mahler at the Vienna Court Opera (now the Vienna State Opera).

== Career ==
In 1901, during his tenure as the conductor of the Orchestra of the King of Württemberg in Stuttgart, Pohlig became the first conductor to perform the complete version of Bruckner's Symphony No. 6, which had previously only been performed in excerpts and in Mahler's edited version.

In 1907, Pohlig was appointed as conductor of the Philadelphia Orchestra, a post that he held until 1912. It was during this time (in 1909) that he invited Sergei Rachmaninoff to make his U.S. debut with the orchestra.

Pohlig subsequently resigned from the Philadelphia Orchestra when it was revealed that he had been involved in an extramarital affair with his Swedish secretary, Ella Janssen, and then sued the orchestra for breach of contract, as he had one year remaining on his contract at that time. He received a settlement of one year's salary.

Pohlig concluded his career as conductor of the Braunschweig court opera in Germany, the city in which he died on June 17, 1928.
