= Alberto Lizzio =

Fictional conductor

Alberto Lizzio was a pseudonym invented by record producer and conductor Alfred Scholz and attached to older performances, often conducted by Milan Horvat, Carl Melles or Scholz himself. These performances were used to put out inexpensive classical recordings for the mass market or for production music.

== Biography ==
Scholz wrote a fictitious biography of Lizzio, claiming he was born in Merano, South Tyrol, Italy, on 30 May 1926, studied violin, composition and conducting in Milan, Lombardy, and that his second wife, with whom he had a son, died in 1980 in a car accident in which Lizzio was severely injured. The fictitious biography concludes with his death on 22 October 1999, in Dresden.
