= String Quintet (Bruckner) =

Bruckner's mature chamber work

String quintet
- by Anton Bruckner
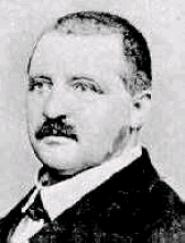
- The composer, c. 1860
- Key: F major
- Catalogue: WAB 112
- Form: Viola quintet
- Composed: December 1878 – 12 July 1879: Vienna
- Dedication: Duke Maximilian Emanuel in Bavaria
- Performed: 17 November 1881: Vienna (movements 1–3)
- Published: 1884
- Recorded: 29 December 1937
- Movements: 4

Anton Bruckner's String Quintet in F major, WAB 112 was composed in 1878/79 in Vienna.

== History ==
Bruckner's superior Joseph Hellmesberger Sr. requested Bruckner for a string quartet. Instead of a string quartet, Bruckner composed a viola quintet, starting the composition in December 1878 and ended it on 12 July 1879. Bruckner dedicated the Quintet to Duke Maximilian Emanuel in Bavaria. When looking at the score, Hellmesberger found the scherzo too challenging for the group to perform. In response, Bruckner wrote a less demanding, eight-minute long Intermezzo in the same key as alternative to the scherzo. The first three movements were premiered by the Winkler Quartet with Franz Schalk joining on second viola on November 17, 1881 in Vienna. It was not until 1885 that the Hellmesberger Quartet played the Quintet with the original scherzo, Hermann Kupka joining on second viola. Duke Emanuel was pleased by the composition and gave Bruckner a diamond pin. In all, there were 23 performances of the Quintet in Bruckner's lifetime.

== Music ==
The String Quintet, which is scored for two violins, two violas and a cello, is in four movements:

1. Gemäßigt, F major, 3/4
2. Scherzo: Schnell, D minor, Trio: Langsamer, E♭ major, both 3/4
3. Adagio, G♭ major,
4. Finale: Lebhaft bewegt, F minor to F major,

Duration: about 43 minutes. At first the Scherzo was third rather than second, as in most of Bruckner's symphonies.

Bruckner's only large chamber music work is symphonic, but also contains clearly distinct instrumental part writing.

A wealth of musical ideas is unfolded: Polyphony and motive-thematic work play a significant role, and a colourful pattern is established by the deployment of the tessituras and the voices of all the instruments, with audacious modulations, theme inversions and half-tone key changes (such as the Adagio in G♭ major).

Differently from in Bruckner's symphonies, the form is more compact and the score starts with a clear melodic profile in 3/4 on a pedal point of the cello. On the other hand, the finale starts as in the symphonies with a tremolo. The combination of all musical ideas at the end of the first movement, and the three-thematic setting of the finale are also similar to that of Bruckner's symphonies. Like that of the next Seventh Symphony, the finale is in "arch form".

Bruckner biographer Derek Watson finds the work "by no means a 'symphony for five strings' and it never stretches the quintet medium beyond its capabilities, save perhaps for the last seventeen bars of the finale, where [Bruckner] is thinking too much in orchestral terms." Robert Simpson, in the revised, 1992 edition of The Essence of Bruckner, withdrew the reservations he had expressed about this work in the first two editions of that work and declared it "one of the most idiosyncratic but deepest chamber works since Beethoven."

After the enormous effort of the Fifth Symphony and the simultaneous revision of nearly all of his other major works, all accomplished by 1878, Bruckner regrouped his resources by undertaking new works on a deliberately smaller scale, in which he stylistic resources could continue to develop in more intimate and controllable dimensions.

== Genesis ==
Anton Bruckner composed his string quintet (WAB 112) in the years 1878 and 1879. In a letter dated 9 December 1878 to the music critic Wilhelm Tappert in Berlin, he mentions a new work that he was working on: "Currently I am writing a string quintet in F major, as Hellmesberger repeatedly and urgently requested me, who is known to rave about my stuff." The autograph describes the origin of the individual movements: The beginning of the second movement is dated April 6, 1879, at the end of which March 31, 1879, at the end of the third movement July 12, 1879 and at the end of the fourth movement June 25, 1879. The first movement ends with the year 1879." Already in the letter to Tappert quoted, Bruckner thus indicates the cause of the creation of the work. The Viennese violinist and conductor Josef Hellmesberger has obviously made the difference that Bruckner even tackled the composition of a larger chamber music work.

In a letter to the Florian priest and choir director Ignaz Traumihler, Bruckner reports on the completion of his string quintet and at the same time hopes for the premiere by Josef Hellmesberger: "My quintet is ready! Hofkapellmeister Hellmesberger is completely out of joint with joy, and wants to perform it. He is totally changed, and gives me huge kudos." In fact, Hellmesberger had hesitated with the premiere. The Bruckner biographer August Göllerich notes: "As with the genius any impression is converted into the gigantic, Bruckner seems to have taken even some authoritative words of Hellmesberger on the now completed quintet too seriously." And Göllerich continues to write: "Although Hellmesberger at first was unable to push the master to perfection, he received 'regular finger pain' when it was scheduled for the evenings of his quartet. Bachrich [the first violist] affirmed his' master and master '[means Hellmesberger]:' we are laughed at 'and the work was' removed from the schedule." – The Hellmesberger Quartet could then not claim the premiere for themselves either. Instead, the enlarged Winkler Quartet (Julius Winkler, Carl Lillich, Hans Kreuzinger, Julius Desing, Theodor Lucca) played the work of the string quintet for the first time on 17 November 1881 in the Bösendorfer Hall of the Musikverein Vienna on the initiative of the Bruckner-admirer Josef Schalk an "internal evening" of the Akademische Wagner-Verein. However, the final set had been omitted at that time. After the end of the dress rehearsal Bruckner hurried after the critic Eduard Hanslick: "Bruckner exhausted himself in acknowledgments, for the high honor 'and made, much to the wrath of his friends, who then did not miss a respectable reprimand, the attempt, Hanslick to kiss the hand! This scene will be unforgettable too. Far from being weird, I had the impression of being moving and moving." Finally, the first complete performance took place with the Hellmesberger Quartet (Josef Hellmesberger sen., Josef Hellmesberger junior [each violin], Josef Maxintsak [viola], Ferdinand Hellemsberger [violoncello]) and H. Kupka [viola] on January 8, 1885.

== Publishing ==
Bruckner initially found no publisher for his new work: "All efforts of the master and his admirers to find a publisher in Vienna, were unsuccessful". The efforts of the conductor Hans Richter to find a publisher in England also failed. Only the Bruckner pupil Josef Schalk reached with the Viennese publisher Alfred Gutmann a publication of the string quintet, whereby at the same time Schalk's own four-handed piano version as well as his piano arrangement of the slow movement were intended for printing.

== Reception ==
While the Viennese critics Gustav Dömpcke, Max Kalbeck and Eduard Hanslick responded to the string quintet dismissively to hostile, the Bruckner admirers Theodor Helm and Ludwig Speidel praised the originality and sound beauty of the new work. Thus, in 1884, Theodor Helm emphasized: "While the finale of the Bruckner Quintet – at least the effect of first-time listening – is in doubt, the three remaining movements are of the highest interest, especially in the happy and original invention of the motives. ... But the pearl of the quintet is the Adagio (in G♭ major), one of the noblest, most enlightened, tenderest and most beautiful in sound, written in modern times [...]. What an exceedingly deep, flowing in a truly 'infinite' stream of emotion! This adagio looks rather as if it were a play, only now found in Beethoven's estate, from the last time of the master and animated by his fullest inspiration. This is probably the highest praise that can be said about the composition of a living sound artist, and we are not afraid to say it."

== Movements ==
=== I. Gemäßigt ===
The first movement, in 3/4, is characterized by the, presented by the First Violin, "deviating in the ter-related D-major, genuinely romantic main theme." After a short-limbed idea of transition follows the vocal period in F♯ major. In the implementation, the main theme is further processed and modified in the "character of a free improvisation". After a general pause, a mock recital begins, in which the main theme is engrossed, until finally the first violin leads to the actual reprise.

=== II. Scherzo ===
The scherzo, in 3/4, which "best still with the scherzo of the 'Fifth' family resemblance (also tonality equality) shows", differs from the otherwise usual orchestral scherzo of Bruckner's symphonies. A Ländler theme, recited in the second violin, forms the actual core idea of the light-footed work, contrasted by a classical-playful dissociation of the first violin. The middle section Bruckner calls "almost Andante" to take. A renewed slowdown almost brings it to a standstill until the original main idea once again gains central importance. Striking are the numerous harmonic halftone movements from D minor to D♭ major.

=== III. Adagio ===
While the opening movement and the finale are in F major, the scherzo in D minor and the trio in E♭ major, the third movement (4/4 time) in G♭ major (lower part of the Grosz to F major) increases, The main theme, recited by the first violin, is set directly without preparation and flows widely. On the constant eighth pulse of second violin and second viola, a new thought sounds as a reversal of the main theme. In the lead-through section, a downward-pearling sixteenth-note figure is continually increased, until it comes to an increasing clumping of sound. After a fermata, an increase wave begins again, culminating in a treble in triple fortissimo followed by a delicate epilogue.

=== IV. Finale: Lebhaft bewegt ===
"Certainly this finale is one of the strangest in Master's oeuvre. First of all, his key is completely veiled, but there is nothing to be assumed in Meister's sense of tonality except that it strives to return to the main key of the work." the Bruckner biographers Max Auer and August Göllerich declare and recommend the finale directly to the Adagio at the performance of the work The 3/4-measure of the first movement is juxtaposed with the 4/4 measure of the final movement. Above a pulsating organ point D♭, the quartet-containing main theme sounds in the second violin. First viola and first violin respond with a sweeping melodic phrase. Striking is the frequent use of sixths in the Ländler-like eighth-note of the first viola, which is due to the line of the second violin and the violoncello of the first part and refers directly to the trio in scherzo. An airy counterpart of the first violin pushes playfully unstoppable upwards. The actual implementation theme becomes the starting point of a fugue whose theme is contrasted with a striking triplet figure. Finally, the recapitulation follows in D♭ major. The coda is a jubilant conclusion.

=== Intermezzo D minor ===
Josef Hellmesberger, on whose initiative the string quintet was written, rejected the scherzo originally intended by Bruckner and "demanded a new movement as a substitute . Bruckner then composed a new piece – the Intermezzo, completed on December 21, 1879 (WAB 113)." Its principle theme consists of a lilting Ländler figure in 3/4 time, played the second violin. The frequent occurrence of the key of G♭ major makes direct reference to the slow movement. In the development section a transformation of the motifs of the first part takes place. The artfully crafted work, called Moderato, was first published in 1913 and is sometimes used as an additional movement in performances of the string quintet. The world premiere was given on January 23, 1904 by the Rosé Quartet.

== Stylistic position ==
The string quintet in F major is Bruckner's most extensive and important chamber music work. The Austrian musicologist and Bruckner expert Leopold Nowak emphasizes: "It will continue to be called Bruckner's only composition for chamber music, because the string quartet of 1862 published in the complete edition in 1956, despite all its sterility in form and execution, is also a student work Bruckner himself certainly would only consider it as such."

Occasionally the proximity of Bruckner's string quintet to the late quartets of Beethoven is emphasized. When Bruckner composed his quintet, however, he did not yet know the late quartets of Beethoven – at least according to the statement of the Bruckner researcher Max-Auer, who reports the following: "When Göllerich confessed to this performance [meaning the first performance on 17.11.1881] Bruckner that in the quintet he thinks he recognizes a direct continuation of Beethoven's last quartet, Bruckner, in his modesty, was startled by this comparison with his most revered master, and told him that he unfortunately did not know the last quartets of Beethoven. Göllerich then gave him the scores for the next Christmas." Ernst Kurth emphasizes:" As independent as the voices live in their counterpoint, the sense of sound and boundary blasting is missing, they seek more density, unification, and more. in no way merely harmonious fullness, but rather in the counterpoint to a total tension, which distinguishes them from their crisis-striving urge in Beethoven's last quartets. It is – in spite of many similarities – a different basic feeling, guided by symphonic unity, which is a lot different for Bruckner than for Beethoven."

== Dedication ==
The work is dedicated to "His Royal Higness, the Duke Max Emanuel in Bavaria in deepest reverence." Bruckner received a pin to thank the Bavarian Duke. The choice of a suitably high-ranking personality as dedicatee shows the importance that Bruckner attaches to his string quintet. The Bruckner researcher and organist Erwin Horn shows that Bruckner's "one step after the other in the upwardly open ranking" climbed with his dedications. Bruckner is thus – as far as meaning is concerned – his string quintet on the level of the symphonies.

== Scoring ==
Bruckner's String Quintet in F major is composed for two violins, two violas and one cello. The addition of the second viola particularly emphasizes and enhances the middle range of the string spectrum.

== Arrangements ==
Although Bruckner's String Quintet is primarily a chamber music work, the symphonic aspects of this work have inspired various authors to adapt to diverse instrumentation.

Hans Stadlmair has set up the string quintet for a choral performance and also added double basses. Gottfired Kraus states: "Only the additional use of double basses creates new possibilities of expression, the great string sound lets us recognize in Bruckner's unmistakable language, the role models, not least the influence of Richard Wagner more clearly than in the comparatively brittle chamber music version of the case ." The work was among others recorded by the Bamberg Symphony, conducted by Lothar Zagrosek). The CD was released in 1995 on the Orfeo label.

Peter Stangel has edited the work for chamber ensemble: "Stangel has extended the solo string quintet by double bass, woodwind and two horns to a veritable 'chamber symphony'" and has recorded his arrangement with the chamber ensemble Die Taschenphilharmonie. The CD (live recording) was released in 2007 on the CD label Solo Musica.

Gerd Schaller has made an adaptation for a large orchestra (two woodwinds, four horns, two trumpets, three trombones, timpani and strings): "The orchestral version shows that the Bruckner style basically exists across all genres, thanks to its ingenious, highly individual art forms in the case of this quintet arrangement leads to the winning of a new symphonic dimension for the large concert hall. " The CD recording with the Radio Symphony Orchestra Prague (conductor: Gerd Schaller) was published in 2018 by Label Profile Edition Günter Hänssler (PH16036).

== Versions and editions ==
In Bruckner's original manuscript (1879), the slow movement, an "Andante quasi Allegretto", was put as second movement, and it was also played like that by Helmesberger. In the first issue (Gutmann), it is put as "Adagio" in third position after the scherzo.
In 1884, Bruckner brought some changes and additions to the score, mainly a different coda to the finale. These changes were not taken into account in the first edition.

- Gutmann (1884): The first edition included metronome markings that did not come from Bruckner, namely: Gemäßigt = 72; Schnell = 138; Adagio = 56; Lebhaft bewegt = 144.
- Woess Universal Edition (1922), re-edition including Bruckner's adjustments
- Nowak (1963): critical edition based on Bruckner's manuscript. Nowak's edition includes Bruckner's revisions made in the copy score and in the composition score.
- Gerold W. Gruber, critical new edition (2007), adding in the first two movements a few optional passages, which were removed in the Nowak edition (bars 245 to 264 in the coda of the first movement, and bars 63 to 82 in the scherzo).

== Selected discography ==
There are about 60 recordings of the String Quintet. The first recording was by the Prisca-Quartett in 1937.

Excellent recordings, according to Hans Roelofs, are i.a. those by the Keller Quartett, the Koeckert Quartett, the Amadeus Quartet, the Quintett der Wiener Philharmoniker (Vienna Philharmonia Quintet), the Melos Quartet, the Raphael Quartett, L'Archibudelli, the Vienna String Quintet, the Leipzig String Quartet, the Fine Arts Quartet and the Bartholdy Quintet.

- Koeckert Quartett, Georg Schmid (second viola). Anton Bruckner – String Quintet, F major. LP: DG LPM 18042, 1952; transferred to CD: Forgotten Records (France) fr 225
- Keller Quartett, Georg Schmid (second viola). Anton Bruckner – Complete Chamber Works. LP: Da Camera magna SM 92707/8, 1962; transferred to CD: Musical Heritage Society MHS 1363/4
- Amadeus Quartet, Cecil Aronowitz (second viola). Bruckner – Streichquintett F-Dur. LP: DG LPM 18963, 1964; transferred to CD: DG (Japan), DG 477 573 9
- Vienna Philharmonia Quintet. Bruckner – String Quintet in F major, Intermezzo in D minor for string quintet. LP: Decca STS 15400, 1974; transferred to CD: Decca 430 296-2 (without the Intermezzo)
- Melos Quartet, Enrique Santiago (second viola). Bruckner – Streichquintett F-Dur. CD: Harmonia Mundi HMC 901421, 1992
- Raphael Quartett, Prunella Pacey (second viola). Bruckner: String Quintet; Rondo; Intermezzo. CD: Globe 5078, 1992
- L'Archibudelli. Anton Bruckner: String Quintet. Intermezzo. Rondo. String Quartet. CD: Sony Classical Vivarte SK 66 251, 1994 – on historical instruments
- Vienna String Quintet, Bruckner: String Quintet in F, Intermezzo in D. CD: Camerata 30CM-399, 1994
- Leipzig String Quartet, Hartmut Rohde (second viola). Bruckner: String Quintet F major / String Quartet C minor. CD: MDG 307 1362-2, 2005.
- Fine Arts Quartet, Gil Sharon (second viola). Bruckner: String Quintet in F Major / String Quartet in C Minor. CD: Naxos 8.570788, 2007
- Hyperion Ensemble, Five to six. CD: Paladino Music pmr 0021 – 2008 with Schubert's Fantasie in F minor, D 940 (arr. by F. Lermer for string sextet)
- Fitzwilliam Quartet, James Boyd (second viola). Anton Bruckner: String Quintet / String Quartet. CD: Linn LC 11615, 2011 – on historical instruments
- Bartholdy Quintet, Bruckner – Zemlinsky String Quintets – CD: CAvi Music 8553348, 2013
