= Günter Wand =

German orchestra conductor (1912–2002)

- Born: 7 January 1912; Elberfeld
- Died: 14 February 2002 (aged 90); Ulmiz, Switzerland
- Education: Musikhochschule Köln
- Occupation: Conductor
- Organizations: Cologne Opera; NDR Symphony Orchestra
- Website: www.guenter-wand.de

Günter Wand (7 January 1912, in Elberfeld, Germany – 14 February 2002, in Ulmiz near Bern, Switzerland) was a German orchestra conductor and composer. Wand studied in Wuppertal, Allenstein and Detmold. At the Cologne Conservatory, he was a composition student with Philipp Jarnach and a piano student with Paul Baumgartner. He was a conducting pupil of Franz von Hoesslin in Munich, but was otherwise largely self-taught as a conductor. During his 65-year-long career as a conductor, he was particularly revered for his Schubert and Bruckner, and was honoured with many significant awards, including the German Record Award and the internationally important Diapason d'Or.

== Career ==
In February 1924, aged 12, Wand attended a performance of Der Zigeunerbaron at the Thalia Theatre in Wuppertal-Elberfeld, and was so entranced he decided to become a conductor. The role of Sandor Barinkay that evening was sung by Richard Tauber.

=== Cologne ===
Wand started his career at the Cologne Opera, where he was to stay for several decades, as a conductor of the Cologne Opera in 1939. After World War II his position in Cologne was consolidated as he became Generalmusikdirektor in charge of both the opera and the Gürzenich Orchestra, which he conducted until 1974.

In 1948, he also started teaching conducting at a music school in Cologne. From the early 1950s he guest-conducted a number of orchestras, making his London debut in 1951 with the London Symphony Orchestra. Other orchestras who invited him included the WDR Symphony Orchestra Cologne and Munich Philharmonic Orchestra.

After several recordings of Mozart, Haydn and Beethoven with the Gürzenich for a French subscription collection in the mid-1950s, he made no studio recordings for nearly two decades with the exception of an appearance with the Vienna Philharmonic Orchestra on Decca Records, accompanying Wilhelm Backhaus in Robert Schumann's Piano Concerto (his only recording with that orchestra). In the 1970s and early 1980s, he recorded the complete symphonies of Franz Schubert and Anton Bruckner with the WDR Symphony Orchestra Cologne.

=== Hamburg and late years ===
In 1982, Wand became chief conductor of the NDR Symphony Orchestra. With the latter ensemble, he was able to record the complete symphonies of Beethoven and Brahms as well as works by Mozart, Tchaikovsky, Debussy, Schubert and Schumann. He also remade Bruckner's symphonies 3 to 9.

In January 1982, Wand conducted the BBC Symphony Orchestra for the first time, and was appointed principal guest conductor of the orchestra that same year. Wand was noted for demanding considerable rehearsal time, a minimum of 5 to 8 rehearsals, for his London concerts. On 9 September 1990 his UK Promenade Concert of Bruckner's 5th Symphony with the BBC Symphony was recorded and subsequently released in 2011 on DVD by the BBC/ICA (ICAD 5049). For his first appearance with a US orchestra, the Chicago Symphony Orchestra in 1989, he asked for and received 11 hours of rehearsal time. Wand subsequently recorded the Brahms Symphony No. 1, part of that first U.S. program, with the Chicago Symphony Orchestra.

The highlights of Wand's late career were his annual guest appearances with the Berlin Philharmonic Orchestra, which he conducted in Schubert's "Unfinished" and "Great" symphonies (1995) and Bruckner's Fifth (1996), Fourth (1998), Ninth (1998), Seventh (1999) and Eighth (2001) symphonies.

== Artistic style ==
As a conductor, Wand was a deep believer in the originality of music, aiming to perform works exactly as annotated. His art was marked by straightforward adherence to the score.

When Wand was still a young conductor, a journalist asked him how he'd consider interpreting Beethoven's ninth symphony, more like Arturo Toscanini or rather like Wilhelm Furtwängler. Wand answered laconically: "Like Beethoven".

== Repertoire ==
In his late years, Wand restricted his repertoire almost exclusively to the symphonies of Anton Bruckner (which he had never conducted until he was over 60), Schubert, Brahms, Beethoven and Mozart. Earlier in his career, however, he was a devoted interpreter of the contemporary music of such composers as Frank Martin, György Ligeti, Edgard Varèse, Olivier Messiaen, and initially Bernd Alois Zimmermann as well.

Wand regarded Bruckner as the "most important symphonist after Beethoven". Wand's biographer Wolfgang Seifert wrote that "it is no exaggeration to say that Günter Wand has made an indispensable contribution toward the understanding of Bruckner in our time."

== Compositions ==
Wand also composed music, mostly songs with orchestral accompaniment and music for ballet. One composition was his concertino "Odi et amo", for soprano and chamber orchestra, which Wand wrote for his wife, the soprano Anita Westhoff. Anita Wand (Westhoff) died on 29 December 2009 at Ulmiz (CH), at the age of 89 years.

== Awards ==
During his over 65-year-long career as conductor, Günter Wand received several important prizes, including German Record Award, the German Record Critic's Prize, the Echo Award and twice the internationally significant Diapason d'Or, which he received for his Schubert and Bruckner recordings with the Berlin Philharmonic Orchestra. In 1996 Wand received the rarely awarded Hans von Bülow Medal.

== Discography (sel.) ==
- With NDR-Sinfonieorchester:
  - Beethoven:
    - Sinfonie Nr. 3 & Leonoren Ouvertüre Nr. 3 CD RD60755 (03/1991)
    - Sinfonien Nr. 5 & 6 CD 09026 61930 2 (10/1993)
    - Sinfonien Nr. 1 & 2 CD 74321 66458 2 (04/2001)
    - Sinfonie Nr.1 & Nr.6 Nr.74321891082(11/2001)
    - Sinfonie Nr.2 & Nr.7 Nr.74321891072(11/2001)
    - Sinfonie Nr.3 & Nr.8 Nr.74321891062(11/2001)
    - Sinfonie Nr.4 & Nr.5 Nr.74321891052(11/2001)
    - Sinfonie Nr.9 Nr.74321891042 (11/2001)
    - Sinfonien Nr. 1-9 74321891092 (11/2001)
    - Sinfonie Nr.4 Nr.74321897172 (01/2002)
  - Brahms:
    - Sinfonie Nr. 1 CD 09026 68889 2 (02/1998)
    - Sinfonien Nr. 2 & 3 CD 09026 68888 2 (02/1998)
    - Sinfonien Nr. 1-4 3CD 09026 63348 2 (01/1999)
    - Sinfonie Nr. 4 CD 09026 63244 2 (01/1999)
    - Sinfonien Nr.1 & Nr.3 Nr.74321891022 (11/2001)
    - Sinfonien Nr.2 & Nr.4 Nr.74321891012 (11/2001)
    - Sinfonien Nr.1-4 Nr.74321891032 (11/2001)
  - Bruckner:
    - Sinfonie Nr. 5 (Originalfassung) CD RD60361 (06/90)
    - Sinfonie Nr. 4 „Romantische“ CD RD60784 (04/1991)
    - Sinfonie Nr. 4 2CD 74321930412
    - Sinfonie Nr. 7 (Originalfassung) CD 09026 61398 2 (03/1993)
    - Sinfonie Nr. 9 (Originalfassung) CD 09026 62650 2 (06/1994)
    - Sinfonie Nr. 8 2CD 09026 68047 2 (04/1995)
    - Sinfonie Nr. 6 (Originalfassung) CD 09026 68452 2 (06/1996)
  - Debussy: Le Martyre de Saint Sébastien; CD 74321 75583 (05/2000)
  - Fortner: Bluthochzeit – Zwischenspiele für Orchester; CD RD60827 (12/1991)
  - Martin: Petite Symphonie concertante;
  - Mozart:
    - Sinfonie Nr.36
    - Sinfonien Nr. 39 & 41 „Jupiter“ CD RD60714 (12/1990)
    - Sinfonie Nr. 40;
    - Posthornserenade Nr.74321897172
  - Mussorgsky: Bilder einer Ausstellung
  - Schubert
    - Sinfonie Nr. 5
    - Sinfonie Nr. 8 „Unvollendete“; CD RD60826 (12/1991)
    - Sinfonie Nr. 9 „Große C-Dur“ CD RD60978 (12/1991)
  - Schumann: Sinfonie Nr. 4
  - Stravinsky
    - Concerto in Es (Dumbarton Oaks);
    - Pulcinella Suite; CD 09026 61190 2 (10/1992)
  - Tchaikovsky
    - Sinfonie Nr. 5 CD 09026 68032 2 (11/1994)
    - Sinfonie Nr. 6 „Pathétique“
  - Webern: 5 Stücke für Orchester, op.10
- NDR Live-Recordings 1989-1995:
  - Beethoven, Bruckner, Mozart, Tschaikowsky, Schubert 17 CD Box 74321 34162 2 (09/1996)
- With Kölner Rundfunk-Sinfonieorchester:
  - Bruckner:
    - The 9 Symphonies 10CD 09026639302 (08/1989)
    - Symphony No. 1 (Wiener Fassung) CD 09026639312 (12/1989)
    - Symphony No. 2 CD 09026639322 (12/1989)
    - Symphony No. 3 CD 09026639332 (12/1989)
    - Symphony No. 4 „Romantische“ CD 09026639342 (12/1989)
    - Symphony No. 5 CD 09026639352 (12/1989)
    - Symphony No. 6 CD 09026639362 (12/1989)
    - Symphony No. 7 CD 09026639372 (12/1989)
    - Symphony No. 8 & 9 CD 09026639382 (12/1989)
  - Schubert:
    - The Complete Symphonies 5CD 09026639402 (08/1989)
    - Symphony No. 1 & 2 CD 09026639412
    - Symphony No. 3 & 6 CD 09026639422
    - Symphony No 4 & 8 CD 09026639432
    - Symphony No 5 (Selections from Rosamunde) CD 09026639442
    - Symphony No. 9 CD 09026639452
- With Berliner Philharmoniker:
  - Bruckner:
    - Sinfonie Nr. 5 (Originalfassung)CD 09026 68503 2 (12/1996)
    - Sinfonie Nr. 4 „Romantische“ (Haas-Fassung) CD 09026 68839 2 (08/1998)
    - Sinfonie Nr. 9 (Originalfassung) CD 74321 63244 2 (08/1999)
    - Sinfonie Nr. 7 CD 74321 68716 2 (10/2000)
    - Sinfonie Nr.8 CD Nr.743218 28662 (11/2001)
  - Schubert:
    - Sinfonie Nr. 8 „Unvollendete“ & 9 „Große C-Dur“; 2CD 09026 68314 2 (08/1995)

== Literature ==
- Wolfgang Seifert: Günter Wand: so und nicht anders. Gedanken und Erinnerungen. Hoffmann und Campe, Hamburg 1998, ISBN 3-455-11154-8

Cultural offices
| Preceded by Eugen Papst | Kapellmeister, Gürzenich Orchestra Cologne; 1945–1974 | Succeeded by Yuri Ahronovich |
| Preceded by Klaus Tennstedt | Chief Conductor, North German Radio Symphony Orchestra; 1982–1990 | Succeeded by John Eliot Gardiner |
