= John Williamson (musicologist) =

British musicologist

John Gordon Williamson (born 1949) is a Scottish musicologist and retired academic. After studying music and history at the University of Glasgow, he completed his doctoral studies at Balliol College, Oxford. In 1974, he was appointed to a lectureship at the University of Liverpool; he was subsequently a professor of music and head of the School of Music there. He specialises in Austro-German music between 1850 and 1950, and he has studied the works of Pfitzner, Strauss, Liszt, Mahler and Wolf.

== Selected publications ==
- The Music of Hans Pfitzner (Oxford University Press, 1992).
- Strauss: 'Also Sprach Zarathustra (Cambridge University Press, 1993).
- (Editor) The Cambridge Companion to Bruckner (Cambridge University Press, 2004).
