= Werner Wolff (musician) =

Conductor and musicologist (1883–1961)

Werner Wolff (October 7, 1883 – November 25, 1961) was a German-born conductor and musicologist who was conductor of the Hamburg Opera and founded the Chattanooga Opera Association in Chattanooga, Tennessee.

== Biography ==
Wolff was born in Berlin in 1883, the son of Hermann and Louise Wolff. His father was a founder of the Berlin Philharmonic and a secretary to conductor and composer Hans von Bülow. Werner Wolff's mother discouraged her son's early interest in music as a profession, so he took a law degree at Baden, but continued to compose music as an avocation. Encouraged in his interest by prominent musicians in Berlin, he studied at the conservatory at Leipzig during the years before World War I.

Following his musical training, Wolff took positions with opera companies in Danzig, Düsseldorf, and Prague before becoming a conductor for the Hamburg Opera in 1917. He continued with the Hamburg Opera until 1932, developing a reputation as one of the leading conductors in Germany.

Wolff and his wife, operatic soprano Emmy Land, emigrated to the United States in 1938, fleeing Nazism. They resided in New York City until Wolff was employed as head of the music department at Tennessee Wesleyan College in Athens, Tennessee and Land became voice and music teacher at the same school. In the early 1940s they were hired by the University of Chattanooga and the Cadek Conservatory of Chattanooga, Tennessee as teachers. In 1942 Dr. Wolff wrote a book entitled Anton Bruckner, rustic genius (ISBN 0-8154-0449-2), in which he recounted the composer's visit to his family when he was a boy.

Interested citizens learned of the Wolffs' operatic expertise from their great success in Europe (mainly in Hamburg, Vienna) and asked them to organize a Chattanooga Opera Association which they did in 1943. Madame Emmy Land Wolff died in 1955 and Dr. Wolff retired from opera five years later and returned to Rüschlikon, Switzerland, where he died in 1961. Many feel that this couple created a sensation with their opera productions in Chattanooga. The opera company they founded (now part of the Chattanooga Symphony and Opera) is still active.
