= Georg Tintner =

Austrian conductor (1917–1999)

- Born: 22 May 1917; Vienna, Austria
- Died: 2 October 1999 (aged 82); Halifax, Nova Scotia, Canada
- Occupation: Conductor
- Awards: Order of Canada

Georg Tintner, CM (22 May 1917 – 2 October 1999) was an Austrian conductor whose career was principally in New Zealand, Australia, and Canada. Although best known as a conductor, he was also a composer (he considered himself a composer who conducted).

As a child he was a singer in the Vienna Boys' Choir, the first Jew ever to be accepted; at that time the choir was directed by Franz Schalk. At the Vienna State Academy he studied composition with Joseph Marx and conducting with Felix Weingartner. Soon he was assistant conductor of the Vienna Volksoper.

Due to the persecution of Jews, Tintner moved out of Vienna in 1938, arriving in Auckland, New Zealand in 1940. En route, he was falsely accused of being a German spy and arrested in Australia. He conducted a church choir until after the war, when he took over the Auckland Choral Society in 1947, and the Auckland String Players in 1948. He became a New Zealand citizen in 1946. In 1954, he went to Australia and became resident conductor of the National Opera of Australia (a private company) before joining the Australian Elizabethan Theatre Trust Opera in 1957. Tintner is credited with pioneering televised opera in Australia.

He spent a year with the Cape Town Municipal Orchestra (1966–67) and three years with Sadler's Wells Opera (1967–70) before returning to Australia as music director of the West Australian Opera. In 1974, he rejoined the Australian Elizabethan Theatre Trust Opera, by then known as the Australian Opera. He became music director of the Queensland Theatre Orchestra in 1976.

In 1987 he moved to Canada, where he became director of Symphony Nova Scotia. In 1998, he was made a Member of the Order of Canada. On 2 October 1999, after a six-year struggle with cancer, he jumped to his death from the balcony of his 11th-storey Halifax apartment.

Tintner was described as "one of the greatest living Bruckner conductors." He recorded a much-praised complete cycle of Bruckner symphonies for the Naxos CD label shortly before the end of his life (recording sessions: 1995–98). In addition to the eleven symphonies this cycle includes the 1876 Adagio and the 1878 'Volksfest Finale'.

Naxos is also releasing a "Tintner Memorial Edition" comprising re-releases of some of his earlier recordings of composers other than Bruckner. A disc of Tintner's piano music has also been released by the same label, valuably revealing a side of the man long-forgotten since his student days. Some of his own early compositions have been recorded: Violin Sonata, Piano Sonata, Trauermusik, Chopin Variations, and Prelude.

His daughter was the dancer Hephzibah Tintner (1971–2001), whom he named after the pianist Hephzibah Menuhin. She was the partner of then Lord Mayor of Sydney and later NSW (Labor Party) state politician Frank Sartor.
