= Leopold Nowak =

Austrian musicologist (1904–1991)

Leopold Nowak (17 August 1904 – 27 May 1991) was an Austrian musicologist chiefly known for editing the works of Anton Bruckner for the International Bruckner Society. He reconstructed the original form of some of those works, most of which had been revised and edited many times.

Nowak was born in Vienna, Austria. He studied piano and organ at the Imperial Academy of Music in Vienna. He studied musicology with Guido Adler and Robert Lach at the Vienna University, where he later taught from 1932 to 1973.

He succeeded Robert Haas as music director of the music collection of the Austrian National Library in 1946, and is credited with helping preserve documents about Bruckner.

Nowak's approach to editing Bruckner's music was much more scientific than Haas's. Whereas Haas, for instance, combined passages from the 1887 and 1890 versions of Bruckner's Symphony No. 8 in C minor to make his edition of the work, Nowak produced two separate editions for the two versions. Nowak also wrote essays examining theoretical aspects of music by Bruckner and other composers, such as his essay on metrical and rhythmical elements in the symphonies of Beethoven and Bruckner.

Nowak worked on a new edition of Wolfgang Amadeus Mozart's famously incomplete Requiem, and was able through detailed scrutiny to distinguish Mozart's own handwriting from that of Süßmayr and Eybler to an extent no one had been able to do before. In recognition, Nowak was awarded the Goldene Mozart Medaille in 1985.

Nowak also studied Gregorian chant and the music of Heinrich Isaac, Joseph Haydn, Austrian church and folk music, and various Austrian composers from the 1480s onwards.

His work on Bruckner's music, particularly the Finale of Bruckner's Ninth Symphony, was continued by William Carragan.
