= Bruckner Gesamtausgabe =

Catalog of the works of Anton Bruckner

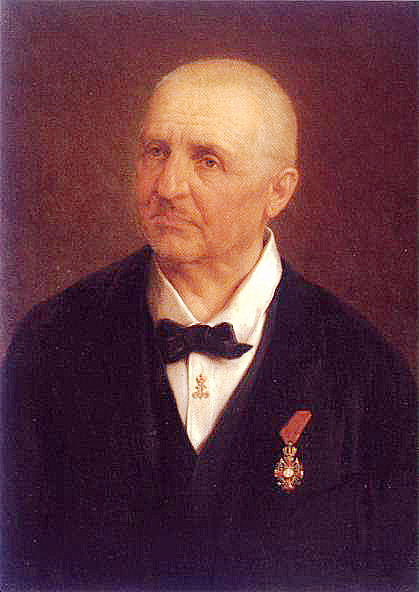
- Language: German
- Publisher: Musikwissenschaftlicher Verlag Wien
- Publication date: 1930
- Publication place: Austria

The Bruckner Gesamtausgabe (Brucker's Complete Edition) is a critical edition of the works of Anton Bruckner. Published by Musikwissenschaftlicher Verlag Wien in Vienna, it comprises three successive editions.

1. Alte Gesamtausgabe (1930–1944, Editorial Head: Robert Haas)
  This first edition (12 volumes issued) included 'hybrid' scores for Symphonies Nos. 2 and 8 and other similar conflations for some other revised works (Mass No. 3).
2. Neue Gesamtausgabe (1951–1989, Editorial Head: Leopold Nowak)
  In this new edition Nowak et al. went about publishing several versions of some works, in the process correcting some mistakes of Haas. From 1990 onwards (Editorial Head: Herbert Vogg), William Carragan, Paul Hawkshaw, Benjamin-Gunnar Cohrs et al. were in the process of reviewing and further correcting the work of Haas and Nowak.
3. Anton Bruckner Gesamtausgabe (Editorial board: Paul Hawkshaw, Thomas Leibnitz, Andreas Lindner, Angela Pachovsky, Thomas Röder)
  In 2011 it has been decided to issue a new edition, which will include the content of the current edition and integrate, in the meantime, retrieved sources.

== Content of the first edition ==
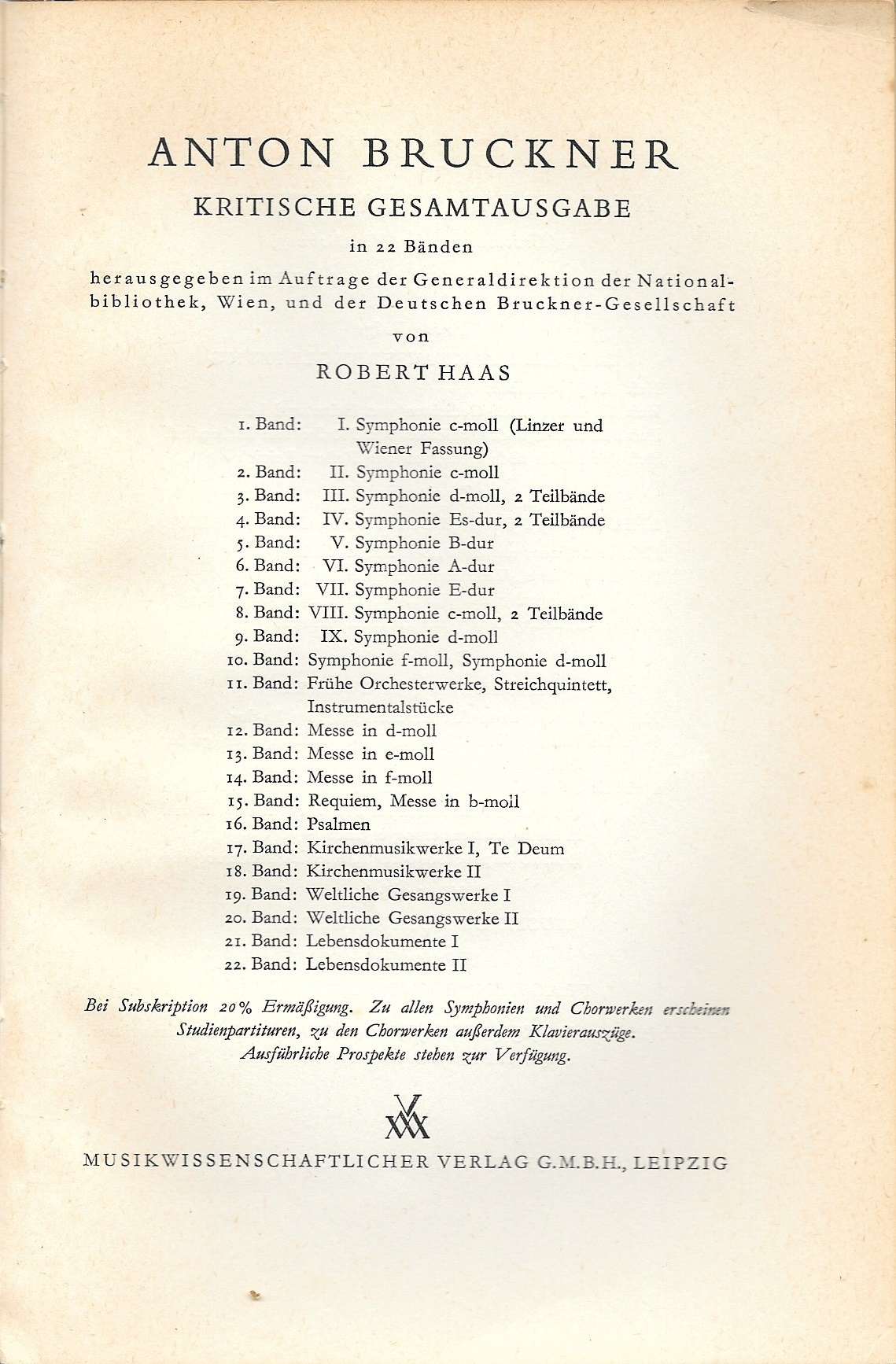
Foreseen content of the first edition

Twenty-two volumes were foreseen, of which twelve were (partially) issued:

- Volume 1: Symphony No. 1, (revised) "Linz version" and "Vienna version", edited by Robert Haas, 1935
- Volume 2: Symphony No. 2 ("mixed" version), edited by Robert Haas, 1938
- Volume 3: [Symphony No. 3, 1873 version, Robert Haas, 1944; editorial material lost in Leipzig's bombing]
- Volume 4: Symphony No. 4, second version (1878) with 1880 Finale (a.k.a. 1881 version) – 1878 Volksfest Finale, edited by Robert Haas, 1936
- Volume 5: Symphony No. 5, edited by Robert Haas, 1935
- Volume 6: Symphony No. 6, edited by Robert Haas, 1935
- Volume 7: Symphony No. 7, edited by Robert Haas, 1944
- Volume 8: Symphony No. 8 ("mixed" version), edited by Robert Haas, 1939
- Volume 9: Symphony No. 9, edited by Alfred Orel, 1934
- Volume 10: –
- Volume 11: Four Orchestral Pieces, edited by Alfred Orel, 1934
- Volume 12: –
- Volume 13: Mass No. 2, second version, edited by Robert Haas and Leopold Nowak 1940
- Volume 14: Mass No. 3, edited by Robert Haas, 1944
- Volume 15: Requiem and Missa solemnis, edited by Robert Haas, 1930

== Content of the second edition ==
- Volume I: Symphony No. 1 in C minor
  - I/1: "(revised) Linz version" (1877), re-edition by Leopold Nowak, 1953
    - I/1A: Adagio (original version 1865–1866, fragment), Scherzo (earlier composition 1865), edited by Wolfgang Grandjean, 1995
  - I/2: "Vienna version" (1890–1891), re-edition by Günter Brosche, 1980
- Volume II: Symphony No. 2 in C minor
  - II/1: First version (1872), edited by William Carragan, 2005
  - II/2: Second version (1877), re-edition by Leopold Nowak, 1965 / new edition by William Carragan, 2007
- Volume III: Symphony No. 3 in D minor
  - III/1: First version (1873), edited by Leopold Nowak, 1977
    - /1A: Adagio No. 2 (1876), edited by Leopold Nowak, 1980
  - III/2: Second version (1877), edited by Leopold Nowak, 1981
  - III/3: Third version (1889), edited by Leopold Nowak, 1959
- Volume IV: Symphony No. 4 in E♭ major
  - IV/1: First version (1874), edited by Leopold Nowak, 1975
  - IV/2: Second version (1878) with 1880 Finale (a.k.a. 1886 version), re-edition by Leopold Nowak, 1953
    - IV/2F: 1878 Finale, re-edition by Leopold Nowak, 1981
  - IV/3: Third version (1888), edited by Benjamin M. Korstvedt, 2004
- Volume V: Symphony No. 5 in B♭ major (1878), re-edition by Leopold Nowak, 1951
- Volume VI: Symphony No. 6 in A major (1881), re-edition by Leopold Nowak, 1952
- Volume VII: Symphony No. 7 in E major (1883), re-edition by Leopold Nowak, 1954
- Volume VIII: Symphony No. 8 in C minor
  - VIII/1: First version (1887), edited by Leopold Nowak, 1972 - new edition by Paul Hawkshaw, 2017
  - VIII/2: Second version (1890), re-edition by Leopold Nowak, 1955
- Volume IX: Symphony No. 9 in D minor (1894), re-edition by Leopold Nowak, 1951 / new edition by Benjamin Gunnar Cohrs, 2000
  - IX/1: First movement
  - IX/2: Scherzo
    - IX/2-Q: Two posthumous trios for the Scherzo, with viola solo (1889/1893), edited by Benjamin Gunnar Cohrs, 1998
  - IX/3: Adagio
  - IX/4: Finale Fragment (1895–1896), edited by John A. Phillips, 1994/1999
- Volume X: Symphony in F minor ("Studiensymphonie", 1863), edited by Leopold Nowak, 1973
- Volume XI: Symphony in D minor ("No. 0", 1869), edited by Leopold Nowak, 1968
- Volume XII: Early Orchestral and Instrumental Works
  - XII/1: Rondo in C minor for string quartet (1862), edited by Leopold Nowak, 1985
  - XII/2: Works for solo piano (1850–1869), edited by Walburga Litschauer, 1988/2000
  - XII/3: Piano works for four hands (1853–1855), edited by Walburga Litschauer, 1994
  - XII/4: Four orchestral pieces (1862), re-edition by Hans Jancik und Rüdiger Bornhöft, 1996
  - XII/5: Overture in G minor (1863), edited by Hans Jancik und Rüdiger Bornhöft, 1996
  - XII/6: Organ works (1846–1890), edited by Erwin Horn, 2001
    - XII/6A: Five pieces in E♭ major (1836–1837), probably not by Bruckner
  - XII/7: Abendklänge for violin and piano (1866), edited by Walburga Litschauer, 1995
  - XII/8: March in E♭ minor for military band (1865), edited by Rüdiger Bornhöft, 1996
- Volume XIII: Chamber Music
  - XIII/1: String quartet in C minor (1861–1862), edited by Leopold Nowak, 1955
  - XIII/2: String quintet in F major - Intermezzo in D minor (1878–1879), edited by Leopold Nowak, 1963 / revised edition by Gerold G. Gruber, 2007
- Volume XIV: Requiem in D minor (1849), re-edition by Leopold Nowak, 1966 / revised edition by Rüdiger Bornhöft, 1998
- Volume XV: Missa solemnis in B♭ (1854), re-edition by Leopold Nowak, 1957
- Volume XVI: Mass No. 1 in D minor (1864), edited by Leopold Nowak, 1975
- Volume XVII: Mass No. 2 in E minor
  - XVII/1: First version (1866), edited by Leopold Nowak, 1977
  - XVII/2: Second version (1882), re-edition by Leopold Nowak, 1959
- Volume XVIII: Mass No. 3 in F minor (1867/1868), re-edition by Leopold Nowak, 1960 / new edition by Paul Hawkshaw, 2005
- Volume XIX: Te Deum (1884), edited by Leopold Nowak, 1962
- Volume XX: Psalms and Magnificat
  - XX/1: Psalm 114 (1852), edited by Paul Hawkshaw, 1997
  - XX/2: Psalm 22 (1852), edited by Paul Hawkshaw, 1997
  - XX/3: Magnificat (1852), edited by Paul Hawkshaw, 1997
  - XX/4: Psalm 146 (1856–1858), edited by Paul Hawkshaw, 1996
  - XX/5: Psalm 112 (1863), edited by Paul Hawkshaw, 1996
  - XX/6: Psalm 150 (1892), edited by Franz Grasberger, 1964
- Volume XXI: Smaller sacred Works (1835–1892), edited by Hans Bauernfeind and Leopold Nowak, 1984/2001
- Volume XXII: Cantatas and Choral Works with Orchestra
  - XXII/1, Nos. 1-5: Name-day cantatas (1845–1855), edited by Franz Burkhart, Rudolf H. Führer and Leopold Nowak, 1987
  - XXII/2, No. 6: Fest-Kantate Preiset den Herrn (1862), edited by Franz Burkhart, Rudolf H. Führer and Leopold Nowak, 1987
  - XXII/2, No. 7: Germanenzug (1864), edited by Franz Burkhart, Rudolf H. Führer and Leopold Nowak, 1987
  - XXII/2, No. 8: Helgoland (1893), edited by Franz Burkhart, Rudolf H. Führer and Leopold Nowak, 1987
- Volume XXIII: Songs and Secular Choral Works
  - XXIII/1: Songs for voice and piano (1851–1882), edited by Angela Pachovsky, 1997
  - XXIII/2: Secular choruses (1843–1893), edited by Angela Pachovsky and Anton Reinthaler, 2001
- Volume XXIV: Letters
  - XXIV/1: Letters (1852–1886), edited by Andrea Harrandt and Otto Schneider, 1998/2009
  - XXIV/2: Letters (1887–1896), edited by Andrea Harrandt and Otto Schneider, 2003
- Volume XXV: The Kitzler Study Book (1861–1863), facsimile edited by Paul Hawkshaw and Erich Wolfgang Partsch, 2014

== New ongoing edition ==
- Volume I/1: Symphony No. 1 in C minor, „Linz“ Version 1868, edited by Thomas Röder, 2016
- Volume IV/1: Symphony No. 4 in E♭ major, First Version (1874 version, revised 1875–76), edited by Benjamin M. Korstvedt, 2019
- Volume IV/2: Symphony No. 4 in E♭ major, Second Version (1881 version) and Second Finale (1878), edited by Benjamin M. Korstvedt, 2023
- Volume VIII/1: Symphony No. 8 in C minor, First Version (1887 version) and Second Adagio (1887–1889), edited by Paul Hawkshaw, 2024
