= Symphonies by Anton Bruckner =

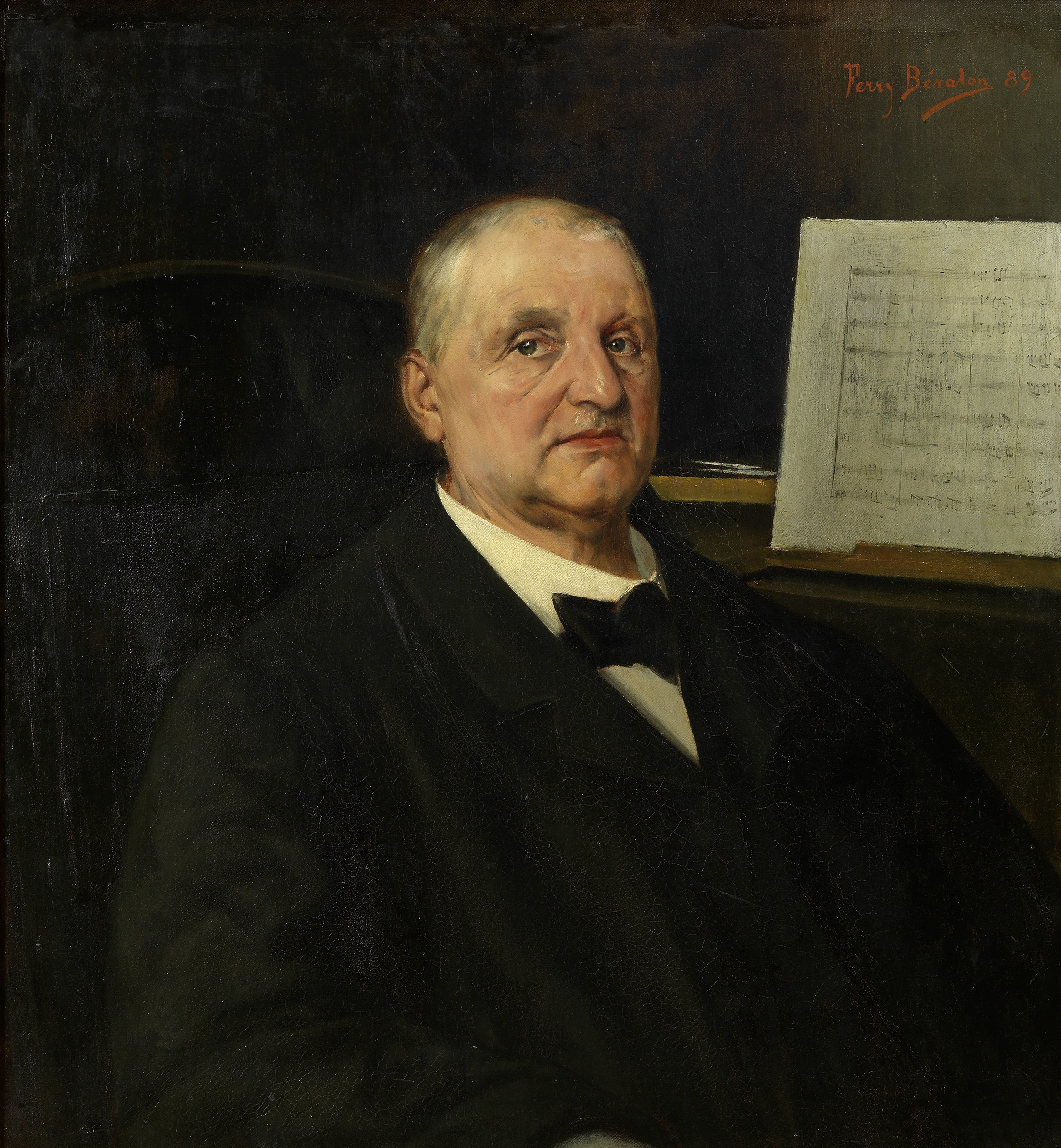
Portrait of Anton Bruckner (1889)

The Austrian composer Anton Bruckner composed eleven symphonies, the first, the Symphony in F minor in 1863, the last, the unfinished Ninth symphony from 1893 to 1896.

Bruckner's F-minor symphony of 1863 was initially designated Symphony No. 1, and, in a letter to his friend Rudolf Weinwurm dated 29 January 1865, Bruckner described the C-minor symphony he was working on at the time as his Symphony No. 2. Later Bruckner decided to leave the F-minor symphony unnumbered, and he called the C-minor symphony of 1865/66 his “Symphony No. 1”. Similarly, the D-minor symphony of 1869 was initially designated Symphony No. 2, while the C-minor symphony of 1872 was his Symphony No. 3. At some time in 1872 or 1873, Bruckner decided to leave the D-minor symphony unnumbered, and he called the C-minor symphony of 1872 his “Symphony No. 2”.

== Linz period ==
=== Symphony in D minor (1863) ===
Before finalising his Symphony in F minor, Bruckner had made on 7 January 1863 sketches for a Symphony in D minor, WAB add 244 (Osterreichische Nationalbibliothek – Mus.Hs.44706, pages 311-314 & 319-321). Ricardo Luna orchestrated the twenty retrieved fragments.

=== Symphony in F minor ===
Otto Kitzler, Bruckner's last composition teacher, set him three final tasks as the climax of his studies: a choral work (Psalm 112), an overture (the Overture in G minor), and a symphony. The Symphony in F minor was completed in 1863. Bruckner later rejected this work, but he did not destroy it. While it certainly reminds one of earlier composers such as Robert Schumann, it also bears the hallmarks of the later Bruckner style. Kitzler simply commented that the work was "not very inspired". It was first performed in 1924 and not published in its entirety until 1973. It is occasionally listed as "Symphony No. 00".

=== Symphony No. 1 in C minor ===
Bruckner's Symphony No. 1 in C minor – sometimes called by Bruckner "das kecke Beserl" (roughly translated as "the saucy maid"), – was completed in 1866, but the original manuscript of this symphony was not reconstructed until 1998. Instead, it is commonly known in two versions, the so-called Linz Version – based mainly on rhythmical revisions made in Vienna in 1877 – and the completely revised Vienna Version of 1891.

=== Symphony in D minor (1869) ===
Bruckner's next symphony was the Symphony in D minor of 1869, the so-called "Symphony No. 0" ("Die Nullte"), a work that was so harshly criticized that Bruckner retracted it completely. It was not performed at all during his lifetime.

=== Symphony in B♭ major ===
Bruckner's next attempt was a sketch of the first movement to a Symphony in B♭ major, but he did no further work on it afterwards. Ricardo Luna has transcribed it first for chamber ensemble: Ricardo Luna, Bruckner unknown – CD Preiser Records PR 91250, 2013, and later for symphonic orchestra.

== Vienna period ==
=== Symphony No. 2 in C minor ===
The Symphony No. 2 in C minor of 1871/1872 was revised in 1873, 1876, 1877 and 1892. It is sometimes called the Symphony of Pauses for its dramatic use of whole-orchestra rests, which accentuate the form of the piece. In the Carragan edition of the 1872 version, the Scherzo is placed second and the Adagio third. It is in the same key as No. 1.

=== Symphony No. 3 in D minor ===
Bruckner composed his Symphony No. 3 in D minor in 1873. He presented it to Wagner along with the Second, asking which of them he might dedicate to him. Wagner chose the Third, and Bruckner sent him a fair copy soon after, which is why the original version of the Wagner Symphony is preserved so well despite revisions in 1874, 1876, 1877 and 1888–9. One factor that helped Wagner choose which symphony to accept the dedication of was that the Third contains quotations from Wagner's music dramas, such as Die Walküre and Lohengrin. Most of these quotations were taken out in the revised versions.

=== Symphony No. 4 in E♭ major, Romantic ===
Bruckner's Symphony No. 4 in E♭ major was his first great success. It is more commonly known as the Romantic Symphony, the only epithet applied to a symphony by the composer himself. The 1874 version has been seldom played; success came in 1878 but only after major revisions, including a completely new scherzo and finale, and again in 1880–1, once again with a completely rewritten finale. This version was premiered in 1881 (under the conductor Hans Richter). Bruckner made more minor revisions of this symphony in 1886–8.

=== Symphony No. 5 in B♭ major ===
Bruckner's Symphony No. 5 in B♭ major crowns his most productive era of symphony-writing, finished at the beginning of 1876. Until recently only the thoroughly revised version of 1878 was known. In 2008 original concepts of this symphony were edited and performed by Akira Naito with the Tokyo New City Orchestra. Many consider this symphony to be Bruckner's lifetime masterpiece in the area of counterpoint. For example, the Finale is a combined fugue and sonata form movement: the first theme (characterized by the downward leap of an octave) appears in the exposition as a four-part fugue in the strings and the concluding theme of the exposition is presented first as a chorale in the brass, then as a four-part fugue in the development, and culminating in a double fugue with the first theme at the recapitulation; additionally, the coda combines not only these two themes but also the main theme of the first movement. Bruckner never heard it played by an orchestra.

=== Symphony No. 6 in A major ===
The Symphony No. 6 in A major written in 1879 to 1881, is an oft-neglected work; whereas the Bruckner rhythm (two quarters plus a quarter triplet or vice versa) is an important part of his previous symphonies, it pervades this work, particularly in the first movement, making it particularly difficult to perform.

=== Symphony No. 7 in E major ===
The Symphony No. 7 in E major was the most beloved of Bruckner's symphonies with audiences of the time, and is still popular. It was written 1881–1883 and revised in 1885. During the time that Bruckner began work on this symphony, he was aware that Wagner's death was imminent, and so the Adagio is slow mournful music for Wagner (the climax of the movement comes at rehearsal letter W), and for the first time in Bruckner's oeuvre, Wagner tubas are included in the orchestra.

=== Symphony No. 8 in C minor ===
Bruckner began composition of his Symphony No. 8 in C minor in 1884. In 1887 Bruckner sent the work to Hermann Levi, the conductor who had led his Seventh to great success. Levi, who had said Bruckner's Seventh Symphony was the greatest symphony written after Beethoven, believed that the Eighth was a confusing jumble. Devastated by Levi's assessment, Bruckner revised the work, sometimes with the aid of Franz Schalk, and completed this new version in 1890. Deryck Cooke writes that "Bruckner not only recomposed [the Eighth]... but greatly improved it in a number of ways.... This is the one symphony that Bruckner did not fully achieve in his first definite version, to which there can be no question of going back."

=== Symphony No. 9 in D minor ===
The final accomplishment of Bruckner's life was to be his Symphony No. 9 in D minor, which he started in August 1887, and which he dedicated "To God the Beloved." The first three movements were completed by the end of 1894, the Adagio alone taking 18 months to complete, and the final eighteen months of Bruckner's life devoted to the fourth-movement Finale. Work was delayed by the composer's poor health and by his compulsion to revise his early symphonies, and by the time of his death in 1896 he had not finished the last movement. The first three movements remained unperformed until their premiere in Vienna (in Ferdinand Löwe's highly revised version) on 11 February 1903. Bruckner suggested using his Te Deum as a Finale, which would complete the homage to Beethoven's Ninth symphony (also in D minor). The problem was that the Te Deum is in C major, while the Ninth Symphony is in D minor, and, although Bruckner began sketching a transition from the Adagio key of E major to the triumphant key of C major, he did not pursue the idea. By the time of his death on 11 October 1896, Bruckner had completed most, if not all, of the fourth-movement Finale, with approximately 560 bars in numbered, sequential bifolios in Bruckner's own hand. There have been several attempts to assemble, augment where necessary and prepare the surviving manuscript material of the Finale for performance. The two most familiar completions are by William Carragan (1983–2010) and by a committee of musicologists, composers and conductors – Nicola Samale, John Philips, Benjamin-Gunnar Cohrs and Giuseppe Mazzuca (SPCM, 1984–2012).

== Conductors ==
Jascha Horenstein made the first electronic recording of a Bruckner symphony (No. 7) with the Berlin Philharmonic in 1928.

Bruno Walter, who acted as an "ambassador" for Bruckner in the United States, made celebrated recordings of symphonies 4, 7 and 9 late in his career and wrote an essay on "Bruckner and Mahler". Otto Klemperer made one of the first two recordings of Bruckner (the Adagio of the Eighth Symphony from 1924). Later, he recorded Symphonies 4–9. Wilhelm Furtwängler made his conducting debut with the Ninth Symphony in 1906 and conducted Bruckner constantly throughout his career. Other Bruckner's pioneers were F. Charles Adler and Volkmar Andreae.

Hans Knappertsbusch was unusual in continuing to perform the first published editions of Bruckner's symphonies even after the critical editions became available. Eugen Jochum recorded Bruckner's numbered symphonies many times, as did Herbert von Karajan. Günter Wand, in addition to audio recordings, also made video recordings of his Bruckner concerts. Georg Tintner received acclaim late in life for his complete cycle of recordings on the Naxos label.

In Japan, Bruckner's symphonies were championed by Takashi Asahina, and multiple concert recordings of each symphony conducted by Asahina have been issued on compact disc.

The Romanian conductor Sergiu Celibidache did not conduct all of Bruckner's symphonies, but those that he did conduct resulted in readings of great breadth, possibly the longest accounts of the works on record. This is especially true in the case of the Eighth Symphony, which lasts over 100 minutes. Although he never made commercial recordings of Bruckner, several recordings of concert performances were released after his death. His pupil Cristian Mandeal recorded in the 1980s the nine numbered symphonies with the Cluj-Napoca Philharmonic Orchestra.

Eliahu Inbal recorded an early cycle—the first to comprise all 11 symphonies—which featured some previously unrecorded versions. For instance, Inbal was the first conductor to record the first version of Bruckner's Third, Eighth, and the completed finale to the Ninth. Daniel Barenboim recorded one 10-symphony cycle of Bruckner's symphonies with the Chicago Symphony Orchestra, and a later 9-symphony cycle with the Berlin Philharmonic. Both of these are notable for including Bruckner's final completed symphonic composition, Helgoland (1893) for men's chorus and large orchestra. In 2017, Barenboim and the Staatskapelle Berlin presented the nine numbered symphonies in a concert series at Carnegie Hall in New York City. Sir Georg Solti also recorded a 10-symphony cycle with the Chicago Symphony. Bernard Haitink recorded a 10-symphony cycle of Bruckner's symphonies with the Concertgebouw Orchestra, and re-recorded several symphonies with the Vienna Philharmonic and Berlin Philharmonic. Stanisław Skrowaczewski recorded all 11 symphonies with the Rundfunk-Sinfonieorchester Saarbrücken.

In the 1980s, Gennady Rozhdestvensky recorded a complete cycle of the eleven symphonies, including the two versions of Symphony No. 1, the three versions of Symphony No. 3, as well as its 1876 Adagio, the two versions of Symphony No. 4, as well as its 1878 "Volksfest Finale" and Mahler's reorchestration, and Samale and Mazzuca's completion of the finale of Symphony No. 9. The cycle did not include the 1872 version of the Symphony No. 2 nor the 1888 version of the Symphony No. 4 since they were not yet published. The 1887 version of Symphony No. 8, which was apparently recorded in February 1988, has not been released. Rozhdestvensky's cycle is still the most complete cycle to date.

Carlo Maria Giulini made a specialty of Bruckner's late symphonies as well as No. 2. Giuseppe Sinopoli was in the process of recording all Bruckner's symphonies at the time of his death.

More recently, Riccardo Chailly, Christoph von Dohnányi, Christian Thielemann, Mariss Jansons, and Benjamin Zander have recorded several Bruckner symphonies. Leon Botstein is the most recent conductor to record inauthentic versions of Bruckner's symphonies (e.g., the 1894 Schalk version of the Fifth). In 2015, Simone Young completed her cycle of all 11 symphonies with the Hamburg Philharmonic. Markus Bosch, and Georg Tintner have likewise recorded complete cycles of all 11 symphonies. Rémy Ballot in 2019 had recorded 6 of a projected complete cycle in the Basilica Church of St. Florian. Gerd Schaller has recorded all 11 symphonies, along with Mass No. 3 and Psalm 146.
