= Four Orchestral Pieces (Bruckner) =

Vier Orchesterstücke
- by Anton Bruckner
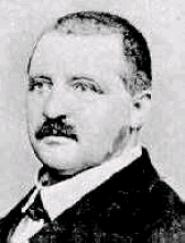
- The composer, c. 1860
- English: Four Orchestral Pieces
- Catalogue: WAB 96–97
- Composed: 12 October 1862: Linz
- Performed: 12 October 1924: Klosterneuburg
- Published: 1930

The Four Orchestral Pieces (Vier Orchesterstücke) are four short orchestral pieces, which Anton Bruckner composed in the fall of 1862 during his tuition with Otto Kitzler.

== History ==
During the summer of 1862, when studying with Otto Kitzler in Linz, Bruckner composed his first instrumental work, the String Quartet in C minor. Thereafter, Kitzler asked him to orchestrate the opening of the first movement of Beethoven's Sonate pathétique. In the fall of the same year, Bruckner tried his hand at own orchestral compositions. These "first arms" resulted in four small orchestral pieces: the Marsch (March) in D minor and the Drei Sätze für Orchester (Three Pieces for orchestra).

The original manuscript is found in the Kitzler-Studienbuch:

- Sketch and discarded first Trio for the March in D minor: pp. 251–252
- March in D minor: pp. 253–265 (dated 12 October 1862)
- Three Orchestral Pieces: pp. 266–271 (undated), 272–277 (dated 10 November 1862), 278–286 (dated 16 November 1862)

A score of the Four Orchestral Pieces was given by Bruckner to his friend Cyrill Hynais, together with that of the Overture in G minor and the Symphony in F minor. These scores are stored in the archive of the Stadt- und Landesbibliothek of Vienna.

The Four Orchestral Pieces were performed first by Franz Moißl on 12 October 1924 in Klosterneuburg. A piano transcription of the March by Max Auer (1930) was put in Band III/2, pp. 29–32 of the Göllerich/Auer biography. The orchestral score of the Three Orchestral Pieces was put in Band III/2, pp. 34–60 of the Göllerich/Auer biography.

The Four Orchestral Pieces are edited in Band XII/4 of the current Bruckner's Gesamtausgabe.

== Setting ==
=== March in D minor ===
The March in D minor (WAB 96) used the orchestral setting of Mozart's late symphonies (2 flutes, 2 oboes, 2 clarinets, 2 bassoons, 2 horns, 2 trumpets, timpani and strings), and three trombones.

The March is in three parts:

1. March (A-BA), 26 bars, with internal repetition,
2. Trio (A-B) in B♭ major, 16 bars, with internal repetition,
3. Reprise of the March, followed by a 5-bar long coda.

Duration: about 4 minutes.

=== Three Pieces for orchestra ===
The Three Pieces for orchestra (WAB 97) are charming, melodious little movements, scored for a similar orchestral setting, with only one trombone.

1. Moderato in E♭ major, 36 bars - three parts: A, B, A' with coda
2. Andante in E minor, 48 bars - three parts: A, B, A' with coda
3. Moderato com moto in F major, 45 bars - three parts: A, B, A repeat.

Total duration: about 9 minutes.

The main interest of the Four Orchestral Pieces lies in the fact that with these compositions Bruckner for the first time touched upon that field which he was to make his life's work: orchestral music. The March and the central section of the final piece have some slight indications of the Bruckner to come. The March contains already a passage which recurs much later in the Eighth Symphony.

== Discography ==
The Four Orchestral Pieces have been recorded about ten times, mainly as addendum to the recording of a symphony. The first recording occurred in c. 1937 by Ludwig K. Mayer with the Berlin City Orchestra (78 rpm: Polydor 57213).

== Sources ==
- Anton Bruckner, Sämtliche Werke, Kritische Gesamtausgabe – Band 11: Vier Orchesterstücke, Musikwissenschaftlicher Verlag der internationalen Bruckner-Gesellschaft, Alfred Orel (Editor), Vienna, 1934
- Anton Bruckner - Sämtliche Werke, Band XII/4: Vier Orchesterstücke (1862), Musikwissenschaftlicher Verlag der Internationalen Bruckner-Gesellschaft, Hans Jancik and Rüdiger Bornhöft (Editors), Vienna, 1996
- Anton Bruckner - Sämtliche Werke, Band XXV: Das Kitzler Studienbuch (1861-1863), facsimile, Musikwissenschaftlicher Verlag der Internationalen Bruckner-Gesellschaft, Paul Hawkshaw and Erich Wolfgang Partsch (Editors), Vienna, 2015
- August Göllerich, Anton Bruckner. Ein Lebens- und Schaffens-Bild, c. 1922 – posthumous edited by Max Auer by G. Bosse, Regensburg, 1932
- Uwe Harten, Anton Bruckner. Ein Handbuch. Residenz Verlag, Salzburg, 1996. ISBN 3-7017-1030-9.
- Cornelis van Zwol, Anton Bruckner 1824–1896 – Leven en werken, uitg. Thoth, Bussum, Netherlands, 2012. ISBN 978-90-6868-590-9
