= Elyakum Shapirra =

Israeli conductor (1926–2014)

- אליקום שפירא
- Born: 27 December 1926; Tel Aviv
- Died: 3 February 2014 (aged 87); London, England
- Occupation: musician
- Spouses: Bernice Rubin (m 3/3/1953), Svetlana Thuss Mintschenko (m 7 May 1979)

Elyakum Shapirra (Hebrew: אליקום שפירא; 27 December 1926 – 3 February 2014) in Tel Aviv, was an Israeli conductor who appeared in a number of countries. (His names also appear as Eliakum and Shapira.)

== Early life and education ==
He studied with Leonard Bernstein, becoming one of his assistant conductors at the New York Philharmonic. He also studied with Serge Koussevitzky at Tanglewood, and at the Juilliard School.

== Career ==
He was Assistant Conductor with the San Francisco Symphony. He led the New York Philharmonic on tours to Canada and Japan in 1960–61. He was guest conductor with the University of the Pacific in 1961. He became Associate Conductor with the Baltimore Symphony Orchestra from 1962 to 1967.

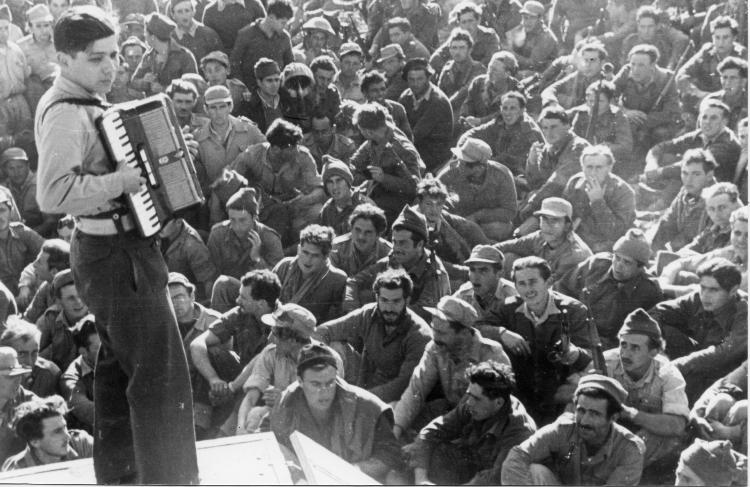
Elyakum Shapirra performing for Israeli soldiers at Auja al-Hafir during Operation Horev, December 1948.

Robert Hall Lewis dedicated his Three Pieces for Orchestra (1966) to Shapirra and the Baltimore Symphony Orchestra.

He was appointed Chief Conductor of the Malmö Symphony Orchestra in Sweden 1969–1974.

Elyakum Shapirra was the first person to conduct Alexander Scriabin's Prometheus: The Poem of Fire in England with the coloured lighting that the composer called for. This occurred on 4 May 1972 at the Royal Albert Hall with the London Symphony Orchestra.

Shapirra conducted the Royal Philharmonic Orchestra and soloist Georges Pludermacher in the posthumous world premiere of Jani Christou's Toccata for Piano and Orchestra (1962), on 23 April 1973 in Oxford.

From 1975 to 1979 he was the Chief Conductor of the Adelaide Symphony Orchestra in Australia. He was also associated with the Arnhem Philharmonic Orchestra and Overijssels Philharmonic Orchestra in the Netherlands.

== Recordings ==
In 1972 Shapirra made the first commercial recording of Anton Bruckner's Symphony in F minor ("Study Symphony"), with the London Symphony Orchestra. He also recorded Bruckner's Overture in G minor with the LSO.

Other symphonic recordings included Leonard Bernstein's 1st and 2nd symphonies. He also recorded other standard orchestral repertoire with various orchestras, as well as Israeli, Yemeni and Yiddish songs with popular singers.
