= List of piano compositions by Anton Bruckner =

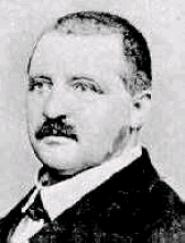
Bruckner, c. 1860

Anton Bruckner composed about 50 small piano works, the earliest in 1850, the last in 1868.

== Works for piano for two hands ==
Seven works are edited in Band XII/2 of the Bruckner's Gesamtausgabe. These works were mainly composed for his piano pupils during his stay in St. Florian (1845–1855) and in Linz (1855–1868).

- Four Lancier-Quadrille, WAB 120, in C major, compiled in c. 1850 from melodies from Albert Lortzing's Der Wildschütz and Zar und Zimmermann, and Gaetano Donizetti's La fille du régiment, as exercise for his piano pupil Aloisia Bogner: Gesamtausgabe, Band XII/2, No. 1
- Steiermärker (From Steiermark), WAB 122, a 32-bar long piece in G major, composed also in c. 1850 for Aloisia Bogner: Gesamtausgabe, Band XII/2, No. 2 It is a kind of stylised Ländler in A-B-C-A form.
- Klavierstück, WAB 119, an 18-bar long "piece for piano" in E♭ major, composed in c. 1856 for teaching purpose: Gesamtausgabe, Band XII/2, No. 3
- Sonatensatz, WAB 243, a 194-bar long first "movement of a sonata" in G minor, found on pp. 157–164 of the Kitzler-Studienbuch: Gesamtausgabe, Band XII/2, No. 7 (Addendum). The partially missing score for the left hand has been completed by Walburga Litschauer.
- Stille Betrachtung an einem Herbstabend (Quiet meditation on an autumn evening), WAB 123, a 58-bar long piece in F♯ minor. A paraphrase of Mendelssohn's Lied ohne Worte opus 30, No. 6, which Bruckner composed on 10 October 1863 for Emma Thanner: Gesamtausgabe, Band XII/2, No. 4
- Fantasie, WAB 118, a 119-bar long, two-part "fantasia" in G major composed on 10 September 1868 for Alexandrine Soika: Gesamtausgabe, Band XII/2, No. 5
- Erinnerung (Remembrance), WAB 117, a 52-bar long piece in A♭ major composed in c. 1868: Gesamtausgabe, Band XII/2, No. 6

=== Piano works composed during Kitzler's tuition ===
About fifty other piano works, which Bruckner composed in 1862 during Kitzler's tuition, are found in the Kitzler-Studienbuch: A not exhaustive list:

- Walzer in E♭ major, WAB 224/1 (p. 25)
- Walzer in C major, WAB 224/2 (p. 26)
- Four Polkas in C major, WAB 221 (pp. 27-28)
- Galopp in C major, WAB add 239 (p. 29)
- Mazurca in A minor, WAB 218 (p. 29)
- Menuett in C major, WAB 219 (p. 30)
- Unnamed exercise in C major (p. 30)
- Two musical periods in C major (p. 31)
- Menuett and Trio in G major, WAB 220 (p. 35)
- Marsch in C major, WAB 217/1 (p. 36)
- Marsch in D minor, WAB 217/2 (p. 37)
- Duo in A minor, WAB 213 (p. 39)
- Marsch in F major, WAB 217/3 (p. 41)
- Andante für Klavier in E♭ major, WAB 211/1 (p. 49)
- Andante für Klavier D minor, WAB 211/2 (pp. 50-51)
- Etüde in G major, WAB 214 (pp. 77–78)
- Chromatische Etüde in F major, WAB 212 (pp. 79-80)
- Five Variationen über ein Thema, WAB 223
  - Theme and variations in G major: p. 81
  - Theme and variations in A major: pp. 82–83
  - Theme and variations in A major: p. 84; also p. 86
  - Theme and variations in G major: pp. 84–85
  - Theme and variations in G major: pp. 87–90
- Theme in F major (p. 90)
- Seven rondos, WAB 222
  - Rondo in G major (pp. 105-108)
  - Rondo in C minor (pp. 109-111)
  - Rondo in D minor (pp. 112-115)
  - Rondo in F major (pp. 116-121)
  - Rondo in G major (pp. 122-125)
  - Rondo in E minor (pp. 126-129)
  - Rondo in E♭ major (pp. 130-134)
- Five Sonatenentwürfe, WAB add 242 (pp. 140–156)
- Four Fantasien, WAB 215
  - Fantasie in D minor: pp. 213–214
  - Fantasie in C minor: pp. 215–216
  - Fantasie in E♭ major: pp. 216–217
  - Fantasie in F major: pp. 217–218
- Five Klavierstücke, WAB 216 (pp. 225-227)

== Works for piano for four hands ==
- Drei kleine Stücke, WAB 124, three easy pieces (G major, G major and F major), composed in 1853, 1854 and 1855 for the children of Josef Marböck, to be played on their father's birthday: Gesamtausgabe, Band XII/3, No. 1
- Quadrille, WAB 121, composed in c. 1854 for Marie Ruckensteiner Gesamtausgabe, Band XII/3, No. 2. It consists of six parts: Pantalon (A major), Été (D major), Poule (A major), Trénis (F major), Pastourelle (D minor) and Finale (E major). An Straussian orchestration of the piece by Wolfgang Dörner (*1959) was premiered by Christian Thielemann during the 2024 New Year's Concert.

== Selected discography ==
There are about 10 recordings of Erinnerung, WAB 117. The other piano compositions are much less recorded.

Seven recordings are dedicated to Bruckner's piano works:

- Wolfgang Brunner and Michael Schopper, Anton Bruckner – Piano works – CD: CPO 999 256–2, 1996 (all the piano works issued in Band XII/2 and Band XII/3)
- Fumiko Shiraga, Anton Bruckner – Piano works – CD: Bis-CD-1297, 2001 (the works issued in Band XII/2)
- Ana-Marija Markovina and Rudolf Meister, Anton Bruckner (1824 - 1896), Piano Works – Hänssler Classic, HC17054, 2018 (all the piano works issued in Band XII/2 and Band XII/3, as well as 13 piano works from the Kitzler Study Book)
- Francesco Pasqualotto, Bruckner Complete Piano Music – CD Brilliant Classics 95619, 2019 (the works issued in Band XII/2, and 21 piano works from the Kitzler Study Book)
- Todor Petrov, Bruckner - L'œuvre pour piano seul - CD Forgotten Records FR 1998/9, 2021 (the works issued in Band XII/2, and 39 piano works from the Kitzler Study Book)
- Christoph Eggner, Anton Bruckner - Klavierstücke aus dem Kitzler-Studienbuch - CD Gramola 99282, 2023 (24 piano works from the Kitzler Study Book on a restored Bösendorfer fortepiano which has belonged to Bruckner)
- Mari Kodama Bruckner Piano Works – SACD PENTATONE PTC 5187 224, 2024 (the works issued in Band XII/2, and 10 piano works from the Kitzler Study Book)

== Sources ==
- August Göllerich, Anton Bruckner. Ein Lebens- und Schaffens-Bild, c. 1922 – posthumous edited by Max Auer by G. Bosse, Regensburg, 1932
- Anton Bruckner – Sämtliche Werke, Band XII/2: Works for solo piano (1850–1869), Musikwissenschaftlicher Verlag der Internationalen Bruckner-Gesellschaft, Walburga Litschauer (Editor), Vienna, 1989 (Available on IMSLP: Neue Gesamtausgabe: XII/2. Werke für Klavier zu zwei Händen)
- Anton Bruckner – Sämtliche Werke, Band XII/3: Piano works for four hands (1853–1855), Musikwissenschaftlicher Verlag der Internationalen Bruckner-Gesellschaft, Walburga Litschauer (Editor), Vienna, 1989
- Anton Bruckner – Sämtliche Werke, Band XXV: Das Kitzler Studienbuch (1861–1863), facsimile, Musikwissenschaftlicher Verlag der Internationalen Bruckner-Gesellschaft, Paul Hawkshaw and Erich Wolfgang Partsch (Editors), Vienna, 2015
- Uwe Harten, Anton Bruckner. Ein Handbuch. Residenz Verlag, Salzburg, 1996. ISBN 3-7017-1030-9.
- Cornelis van Zwol, Anton Bruckner 1824–1896 – Leven en werken, uitg. Thoth, Bussum, Netherlands, 2012. ISBN 978-90-6868-590-9
- Crawford Howie, Anton Bruckner – A documentary biography, online revised edition
