= Rondo in C minor =

Rondo in C minor may refer to:

- Rondo in C minor (Bruckner)
- Rondo in C minor (Chopin)
