= String Quartet (Bruckner) =

Musical composition by Anton Bruckner

- by Anton Bruckner
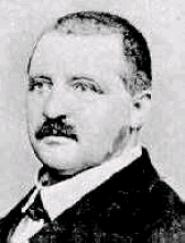
- The composer, c. 1860
- Catalogue: WAB 111
- Composed: 28 July 1862: Linz
- Performed: 15 February 1951: Berlin
- Published: 1955
- Recorded: 1962
- Movements: Four

The String Quartet in C minor WAB 111, was composed by Anton Bruckner's in 1862 during his tuition by Otto Kitzler.

== History ==
In the spring of 1862, during his tuition by Otto Kitzler, Bruckner composed two scherzi for string quartet in F major and G minor. Thereafter, between 28 July and 7 August 1862, he composed the String Quartet in C minor, as a preliminary to exercises in orchestration. The manuscript of the Quartet was found on pp. 165–196 of the Kitzler-Studienbuch.

On reviewing Bruckner's work one week later (15 August 1862), Kitzler was perhaps dissatisfied with Bruckner's unconventionality of the first rondo. He therefore suggested that a rondo in größerer Form and in a more traditional rondo-sonata form would have benefited the piece. The 40-bars longer piece, which has the same key, metre and formal structure as the first rondo, can, therefore, be regarded as an alternative to the first rondo.

The Quartet was not issued during Bruckner's life, since it concerned only a sample of what he was capable of during his period of study with Kitzler. Bruckner did not bequeath a score of the quartet as he did for the later Four Orchestral Pieces. The Kitzler-Studienbuch wound up in the possession of Bruckner's friend Josef Schalk in Munich, where the Quartet was discovered in 1950 by the Koeckert Quartet. The Koeckert Quartet premiered the Quartet on 15 February 1951 in a broadcast of the Rundfunk im amerikanischen Sektor, and performed it on 8 March 1951 in a concert in Hamburg. There are recordings of the 1951 premiere in the broadcasting archives of the RIAS, its successor the Rundfunk Berlin-Brandenburg, and the Bavarian and Norddeutsche Rundfunk. A recording from the archive of the NDR is available in the Bruckner Archive.

== Edition ==
The String Quartet was edited by Nowak in Band XIII/1 of the Gesamtausgabe in 1955.

== Setting ==
The piece is a conventional string quartet in the usual four movements:

1. Allegro moderato (C minor,)
2. Andante (A♭ major, 3/4) with Minore section in A♭ minor
3. Scherzo, Presto (G major, 3/4) Trio
4. Rondo, Schnell (C minor, 2/4)

Duration: 19 to 24 minutes.

Unlike his later works, Bruckner gave few indications as to phrasing, while dynamics appear only at a few key points. Rudolf Koeckert allowed Leopold Nowak to put his group's phrasing and dynamics into the Gesamtausgabe parts. However, the Gesamtausgabe score contains only those markings in Bruckner's hand. The String Quartet is a settlement with classical and early romantic examples. The from the beginning polyphonic imprint refers back to Bruckner's earlier exercises.

The first movement, in traditional sonata form, is with audacious modulations in the development. The exposition is marked for repeat; the only other Bruckner work with such a repeat is the Symphony in F minor.

The Andante, in three parts (ABA) with modified reprise, mirrors Beethoven's choice of key for a slow movement after a C minor Allegro, but having the central section in the parallel minor is something Bruckner never does again.

The trio of the scherzo is in Ländler form. Derek Watson finds that the Trio "has a Schubertian, freshly bucolic charm."

The rondo has virtuoso accents. The B theme appears first in E♭ major and later in C major, and the last turn of the A theme is highly ornamented.

This rondo has a curious feature, in that in Part 6, the B theme from Part 2 and the C theme from Part 4 are present together.

One can already see connections to later Bruckner works in the key (C minor), in several harmonic phrases and theme patterns, as well as the use of Ländler motives.

== Selected discography ==
There are about 10 recordings of the String Quartet.

The live-performance by the Koeckert Quartet (9 March 1951) is, from the archive of the NDR, released on CD 2 of Music from the Archives, Volume 1, SOMM recordings ARIADNE 5025-2 (15 March 2024).

Excellent recordings are according to Hans Roelofs i.a. those by the Koeckert Quartett (1974), L'Archibudelli, the Fine Arts Quartet and the Zehetmair Streichquartett. Where the Koeckert Quartet actually disregarded the few dynamics markings Bruckner gave, the Fine Arts Quartet obeys Bruckner's markings but mostly ignores Koeckert's.

- Keller Quartett, LP: Da Camera magna SM 92707/8, 1962
- Koeckert Quartett. Studio recording of 1974 put on compiling CD: Karna Musik Live KA-143M
- L'Archibudelli. Anton Bruckner: String Quintet. Intermezzo. Rondo. String Quartet. CD: Sony Classical Vivarte SK 66 251, 1995 - on historical instruments
- Leipziger Streichquartett. Bruckner - Streichquintett F major / Streichquartett C minor – CD: MDG Gold 307 1297-2, 2004
- Fine Arts Quartet. BRUCKNER: String Quintet in F Major / String Quartet in C Minor. CD: Naxos 8.570788, 2008
- Zehetmair Streichquartett. Beethoven, Bruckner, Hartmann, Holliger. CD: ECM 2195/96, 2010
- Fitzwilliam Quartet. Anton Bruckner: String Quintet / String Quartet. CD: Linn LC 11615, 2011 - on historical instruments
- Quatuor Diotima. Bruckner & Klose String Quartets, Pentatone LC 868, 2024 – with the first recording of the Theme and Variations for String Quartet, WAB 210

== Sources ==
- Anton Bruckner: Sämtliche Werke: Band XIII/1: Streichquartett c-Moll Musikwissenschaftlicher Verlag der Internationalen Bruckner-Gesellschaft, Leopold Nowak (Editor), Vienna, 1955
- Uwe Harten, Anton Bruckner. Ein Handbuch, Residenz Verlag, Salzburg, 1996, ISBN 3-7017-1030-9
- Derek Watson, "Bruckner", Schirmer, New York, 1996
- Benjamin Korstvedt, "Aspects of Bruckner's approach to symphonic form", The Cambridge Companion to Bruckner edited by John Williamson, Cambridge University Press, Cambridge, 2004
- Cornelis van Zwol, Anton Bruckner – Leven en Werken, Thot, Bussum (Netherlands), 2012. ISBN 90-686-8590-2
- William Carragan. Anton Bruckner - Eleven Symphonies. Bruckner Society of America, Windsor CT, 2020, ISBN 978-1-938911-59-0.
