= Rondo in C minor (Bruckner) =

String quartet music by Anton Bruckner

- String quartet by Anton Bruckner
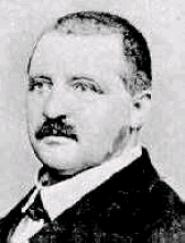
- The composer, c. 1860
- Catalogue: WAB 208
- Composed: 15 August 1862: Linz
- Performed: 17 August 1984: Vienna

The Rondo in C minor (WAB 208) is a composition for string quartet by the Austrian composer Anton Bruckner. It was written in 1862 but was not performed publicly until 1984, after the composer's death. A critical edition was first published in 1985 and the piece was first recorded in 1992 by the Raphael Quartet.

== History ==
During his stay in Linz, Bruckner composed his String Quartet in 1862 as a student exercise assigned by his form and orchestration teacher, Otto Kitzler. On reviewing Bruckner's work, Kitzler was perhaps dissatisfied with Bruckner's unconventionality of the first rondo. He therefore suggested that a new rondo in a more traditional rondo-sonata form would have benefited the piece. Bruckner responded by creating this new large rondo form, creating a new work significantly different in musical content from the original as well as noticeably longer, with a performance time of approximately five minutes. This second Rondo, which has the same key, metre, and formal structure as the first Rondo, can be regarded as an alternative to the first Rondo.

The autograph date on the work is 15 August 1862. The Rondo in C minor was part of the Kitzler-Studienbuch, a collection of autographs and sketches created during Bruckner's studies with Kitzler. As with the other works Bruckner composed during Kitzler's tuition, the Quartet and the additional Rondo were not performed or issued during Bruckner's life. Bruckner did not intend for the Quartet to be publicly performed with either rondo, or for the Rondo in C minor to be performed independently, as he saw these compositions only as technical studies for the purposes of practicing form. Since the work was not known at the time of Renate Grasberger's thematic catalogue of Bruckner's music, Werkverzeichnis Anton Bruckners (WAB), it was initially referred to as "WAB deest" and later as WAB 208 by the Österreichische Akademie der Wissenschaften.

Leopold Nowak, the musicologist known for editing the works of Bruckner, was permitted to access the Kitzler-Studienbuch, which was in private possession, and to transcribe the Rondo in C minor. The Rondo was premiered on 17 August 1984 in Vienna as part of a celebration of his eightieth birthday. Nowak's edited critical edition of the Rondo was first published in 1985 in Band XII of Bruckner's Gesamtausgabe.

== Music ==
The 233-bar piece in C minor and 2/4 time is marked as Allegro molto moderato. It is sparingly notated, with few indications of dynamic. The rondo is in seven parts:

- A1: bars 1–32
- B1: Gesanggruppe, bars 33–68, E-flat major
- A2: bars 69–87
- C: bars 88–139, A-flat major
- A3: bars 140–172
- B2: bars 173–205, C major
- A4: bars 206–233, decorated

(Translation) The rondo theme appears four times and surrounds three other episodes, in which the first was named by Bruckner-self “Gesanggruppe”. Herewith one can recognise a tendency to convergence to the sonata form.

Das Rondothema tritt viermal auf und schließt drei Episoden ein, wobei die erste von Bruckner selbst als „Gesanggruppe“ bezeichnet wurde. Hier erkennt man die Tendenz zur Annäherung an die Sonatensatzform.

Writing for AllMusic, Wayne Reisig remarks that the work's "overall fleet mood will bring to mind Mendelssohn. The reviewer Richard Whitehouse notes that the Rondo's "less angular phrasing and the secondary theme's more expansive manner give the composer greater room to elaborate his material" than in the String Quartet's original rondo. He also describes "a more fully developed central section, serving to place less emphasis on the themes at their reappearance" and a coda that "draws on more imitative means to less forceful ends". The critic Robert Markow for the music publication Fanfare suggests that the Rondo "sounds far more like Haydn than like the Bruckner we know from the symphonies that were soon to follow".

== Discography ==
There are only a few performances of Bruckner's Rondo in C minor:

- Raphael Quartet. Bruckner: String Quintet. Rondo. Intermezzo. Globe 5078, 1992
- L'Archibudelli. Anton Bruckner: String Quintet. Intermezzo. Rondo. String Quartet. Sony Classical Vivarte SK 66 251, 1995
- Fine Arts Quartet, 2003. Download from Classics online; SWR 10241
- Ruysdael Quartet. First Steps. Cobra Records 0032, 2006
- Fine Arts Quartet. BRUCKNER: String Quintet in F Major / String Quartet in C Minor. Naxos 8.570788, 2008
- Quatuor Diotima. Bruckner & Klose String Quartets, Pentatone LC 868, 2024 – with the first recording of the Theme and Variations for String Quartet, WAB 210
