= Kitzler Study Book =

The Kitzler Study Book (Kitzler-Studienbuch) is an autograph workbook of Anton Bruckner which he wrote taking tuition with the conductor and cellist Otto Kitzler in Linz. Bruckner tried to complete his knowledge in musical form and instrumentation with Kitzler after the end of his studies with Simon Sechter.

== Description ==
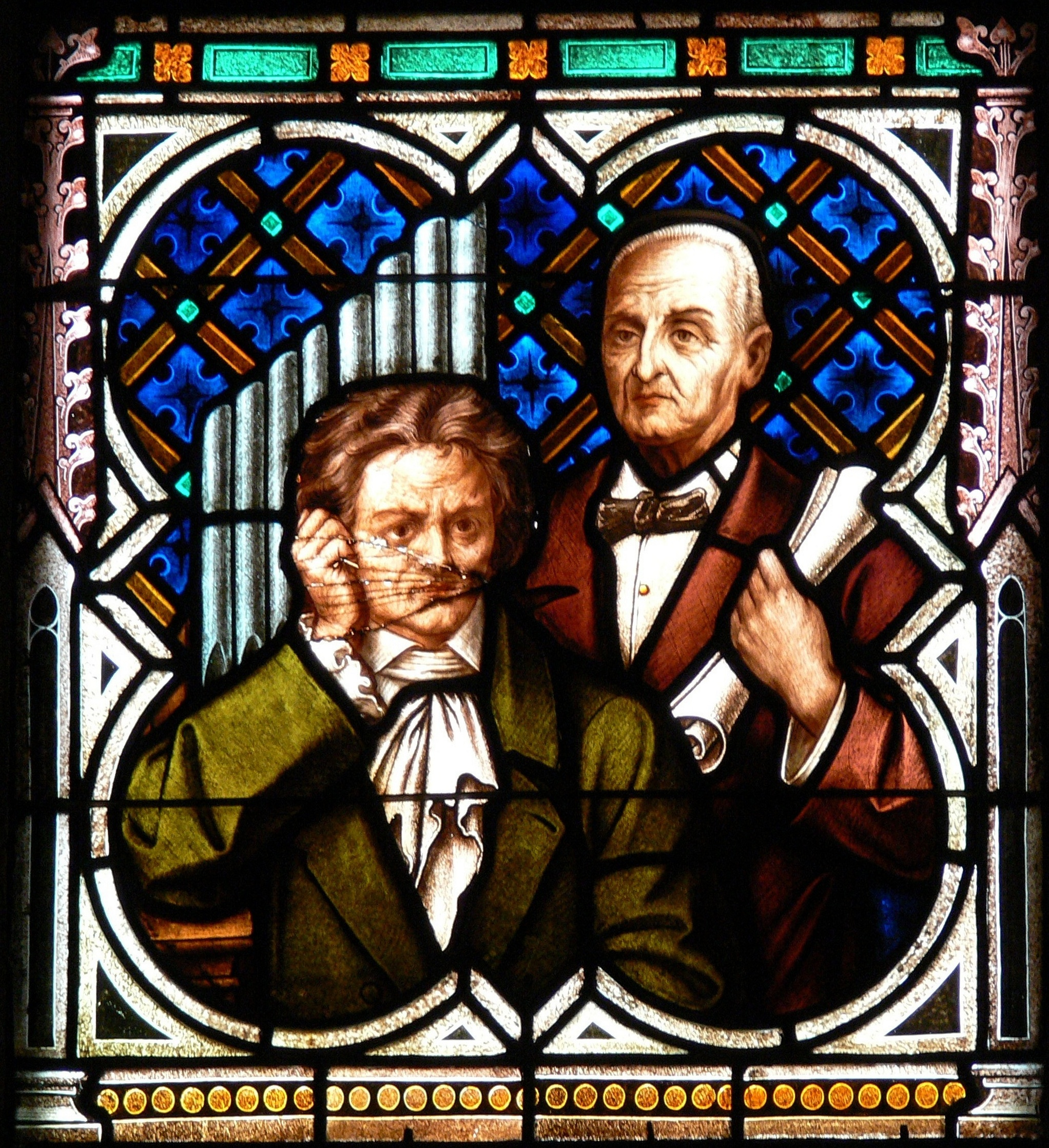
Beethoven and Bruckner Stained glass window, Linz Cathedral

The workbook is composed of 163 pages of different sizes in landscape format (326 numbered pages) in chronological order, some of them dated, from H[eilige] Nacht anno [1]861 (Holy Night, 1861) on p. 30, to 10 July 1863 on p. 325. The workbook contains autograph sketches, comments, complete and partial compositions, which are displaying a rigorous tuition in musical formatting and instrumentation.

The first entries (pp. 1-18) are exercises in musical form: cadences and periods. They are followed (pp. 18-57) by lieder in two and three parts, and (pp. 58-218) by pieces for piano and string quartet: waltz, polka, mazurka, études, theme and variations, rondos, sonata form, etc., and the String Quartet in C minor and its additional Rondo.

The exercises in form are followed (pp. 218–250) by exercises of instrumentation, among others the orchestration of the first movement of Beethoven's Sonate pathétique (introduction and exposition, repetition and coda). These exercises are followed (pp; 251–326) by Bruckner's first orchestral compositions: the Four Orchestral Pieces (March in D minor and Three Orchestral Pieces), and sketches for the Overture in G minor and the Symphony in F minor.

(Translation) The Kitzler Study Book is fascinating because of its insight on the history of the musical apprenticeship in the nineteenth century, as well as the historical and theoretical significance of the terminology and the extent of the conserved exercises. Last but not least, this manuscript is essential for the research on Bruckner's mode of operation.

Das Kitzler-Studienbuch fasziniert wegen seiner historischen Einblicke in die Geschichte der musikalischen Ausbildung im 19. Jahrhundert sowie wegen der historischen und theoretischen Bedeutung von Terminologie und Umfang der darin erhaltenen Übungen. Nicht zuletzt ist dieses Manuskript unverzichtbar für die Untersuchungen über Bruckner Arbeitsweise.

== Complete and partial compositions ==
A not exhaustive list:

- O habt die Thräne gern (1st setting), WAB 205: pp. 18–19
- Nachglück (1st setting), WAB 204: p. 19
- Herzeleid, WAB add 232: p. 20
- Nachglück (2nd setting), WAB add 235: p. 21
- Vor der schlummernden Mutter, WAB 206: p. 22
- Des Baches Frühlingsfeier, WAB 202: p. 23
- Wie neid ich Dich, du stolzer Wald, WAB 207: p. 24
- Waltz for piano in E-flat major, WAB 224/1: p. 25
- Waltz for piano in C major, WAB 224/2: p. 26
- Four Polkas in C major, WAB 221: pp. 27-28
- Galop in C major, WAB add 239: pp. 29
- Mazurka for piano in A minor, WAB 218: p. 29
- Minuet for piano in C major, WAB 219: p. 30
- Minuet and Trio for piano in G major, WAB 220: p. 35
- March for piano in C major, WAB 217/1: p. 36
- March for piano in D minor, WAB 217/2: p. 37
- Duo for piano in A minor, WAB 213: p. 39
- March in F major, WAB 217/3: p. 41
- O habt die Thräne gern (2nd setting), WAB add 236: p. 42
- Last des Herzens, WAB add 234: p. 43
- Es regnet (sketch), WAB add 231: pp. 46–47
- Wunsch (sketch), WAB add 238: pp. 47–48
- Andante for piano in E-flat major, WAB 211/1: p. 49
- Andante for piano in D minor, WAB 211/2: pp. 50–51
- Six scherzi for string quartet, WAB 209
  - Scherzo in C major: pp. 58-59
  - Scherzo in D minor: pp. 60-61; variant on pp. 63-64
  - Scherzo in A minor: pp. 61-62; variant on p. 65
  - Scherzo in C major: p. 62
  - Scherzo in F major: pp. 66-70
  - Scherzo in G minor: pp. 70–76
- Étude for piano in G major, WAB 214: pp. 77–78
- Chromatic étude for piano in F major, WAB 212: pp. 79–80
- Five Themes and variations for piano, WAB 223
  - Theme and variations in G major: p. 81
  - Theme and variations in A major: pp. 82–83
  - Theme and variations in A major: p. 84; also p. 86
  - Theme and variations in G major: pp. 84–85
  - Theme and variations in G major: pp. 87–90
- Theme and variations in E-flat major for string quartet, WAB 210: pp. 91–104
- Seven rondos for piano, WAB 222:
  - Rondo in G major: pp. 105-108
  - Rondo in C minor: pp. 109-111
  - Rondo in D minor: pp. 112-115
  - Rondo in F major: pp. 116-121
  - Rondo in G major: pp. 122–125; variant on p. 136
  - Rondo in E minor: pp. 126-129
  - Rondo in E-flat major: pp. 130–134; variant on p. 135
- Five Sonatenentwürfe (Sketches of sonata), WAB add 242: pp. 140–156
- Sonatensatz (Movement of sonata) for piano in G minor, WAB add 243: pp. 157–164
- String Quartet in C minor, WAB 111: pp. 165–196
- Rondo in C minor for string quartet, WAB 208: pp. 197–206
- Der Trompeter an der Katzbach, WAB 201: pp. 207–213
- Four Fantasies for piano, WAB 215
  - Fantasie in D minor: pp. 213–214
  - Fantasie in C minor: pp. 215–216
  - Fantasie in E-flat major: pp. 216–217
  - Fantasie in F major: pp. 217–218
- Five pieces for piano, WAB 216: pp. 225–227
- Orchestration of the first movement of Beethoven's Sonate pathétique, WAB add 266: pp. 234–250
- March in D minor, WAB 96: pp. 251–265
- Three Orchestral Pieces, WAB 97: pp. 266–286
- Overture in G minor, WAB 98 (sketch): pp. 287–301
- Symphony in D minor, WAB add 244 (20 sketches): pp. 303–306, pp. 311–313
- Symphony in F minor, WAB 99 (sketches): pp. 304–326

== Edition and performances ==
Until 2015, only few of the compositions of the study book were published: the String Quartet, WAB 111 and the additional Rondo in C minor, WAB 208 (transcription allowed to Leopold Nowak), the Sonatensatz in G minor, WAB 243 (transcription allowed to Walburga Litschauer), and the Four Orchestral Pieces, WAB 96-97 (issued from a clean transcription given by Bruckner to Cyrill Hynais).

The Kitzler Study Book, which was first in possession of Bruckner's pupil Ferdinand Löwe, went later in private possession of Margarethe Mugrauer – the granddaughter of Josef Schalk – in Bamberg, who legated it to her daughter Traudl Kress in Munich. In 2013, the Austrian National Library was able to acquire the valuable original manuscript. In 2015, the MWV (Musikwissenschaftlicher Verlag der Internationalen Bruckner-Gesellschaft) has issued a colour facsimile of the manuscript and could so provide interested people with this important source for study and scholarship.

On 30 April 2016, the Orchestergemeinschaft Nürnberg e.V. has premiered Bruckner's orchestration of the opening of the first movement of Beethoven's Sonate pathétique, WAB 266 Other performances occurred on 6 and 7 October 2017 in Austin, TX by Colin Mawby with the Austin Symphonic Orchestra, and on 14 August 2021, during the Brucknertage 2021, in the Marmorsaal of the St. Florian Monastery by Jan Latham König with the Altomonte Orchestra.

On 28 May 2016, a transcription for string orchestra of the Scherzo in G minor for string quartet was performed by Benjamin-Gunnar Cohrs with the Göttinger Barockorchester. The original version of the two Scherzos in F Major and G Minor for string quartet, WAB 209 was premiered by the Bruckners Kammermusik ensemble in Tokyo on 8 March 2019.

In 2018, a première of thirteen piano works from the Kitzler Study Book has been recorded by Ana-Marija Markovina. In 2019, Francesco Pasqualotto has recorded 21 piano works from the Kitzler Study Book, of which are 10 premiere recordings. In 2021, Todor Petrov has recorded 39 piano works from the Kitzler Study Book, of which a premiere of the March in F major, WAB 217/3, the Rondos in C minor and in D minor, WAB 222/2-3, and the first of the Five Pieces, WAB 216. In 2022, Christoph Eggner has recorded 24 piano works from the Kitzler Study Book – of which a premiere of the Rondo in G major, WAB 222/5 – on a restored Bösendorfer fortepiano that has belonged to Bruckner. In 2024, Mari Kodama has recorded 10 piano works from the Kitzler Study Book.

On 5 October 2019, two lieder from the Kitzler Study Book (O habt die Thräne gern, WAB 205, and Vor der schlummernden Mutter, WAB 206) were recorded during the reading Böck ist Bruckner II.

On 2 July 2022, Ricardo Alejandro Luna conducted the Bolton Symphony Orchestra in the world premiere of the 20 Sketches for the 1st movement of a symphony in D minor, WAB add 244. The 20 sketches were transcribed, harmonised, supplemented and orchestrated by Maestro Luna.

On 13 August 2023, a premiere of the Theme and variations in E-flat major for string quartet, WAB 210, was performed by Matthias Giesen with the strings of the Altomonte-Orchester St Florian at the Opening Concert of the St. Florianer Brucknertage 2023. A year later, a recording by the Diotima Quartet was released.

On 1st October 2024 the Quatuor Danel performed in the Brucknerhaus Linz an integral of the compositions for string quartet composed during the Kitzler tuition, including a premiere of Nos. 1-4 of the Six Scherzi for string quartet, WAB 209.

== Discography ==
Orchestration of the first movement of Beethoven's Sonate pathétique

- Christian Hutter, Früjahrskonzert (30 April 2016), Orchester-Gemeinschaft Nüremberg — Orchester-Gemeinschaft Nüremberg CD, 2016

Piano works from the Kitzler Study Book
A total of 43 piano pieces from the Kitzler Study Book has so far been recorded.

- Ana-Marija Markovina and Rudolf Meister, Anton Bruckner (1824–1896), Piano Works – Hänssler Classic, HC17054, 2018 (with premiere recording of 13 piano works from the Kitzler Study Book)
- Francesco Pasqualotto, Bruckner Complete Piano Music – CD Brilliant Classics 95619, 2019 (with 21 piano works from the Kitzler Study Book, of which 10 premiere recordings)
- Todor Petrov, Bruckner - L'œuvre pour piano seul - CD Forgotten Records FR 1998/9, 2021 (with 39 piano works from the Kitzler Study Book, of which 18 premiere recordings)
- Christoph Eggner, Anton Bruckner - Klavierstücke aus dem Kitzler-Studienbuch - CD Gramola 99282, 2023 (24 piano works from the Kitzler Study Book, of which a premiere recording of the Rondo in G major, WAB 222/5)
- Mari Kodama Bruckner Piano Works – SACD PENTATONE PTC 5187 224, 2024 (with 10 piano works from the Kitzler Study Book)

Lieder from the Kitzler Study Book

- Böck liest Bruckner II - Anton Bruckner Briefe und Musik (5 October 2019) - CD Gramola 99237, 2020 - with lieder O habt die Thräne gern, WAB 205 and Vor der schlummernden Mutter, WAB 206 by Elisabeth Wimmer

Theme and variations in E-flat major for string quartet, WAB 210

- Quatuor Diotima. Bruckner & Klose String Quartets, Pentatone LC 868, 2024

== Sources ==
- Uwe Harten, Anton Bruckner. Ein Handbuch. Residenz Verlag, Salzburg, 1996. ISBN 3-7017-1030-9.
- Cornelis van Zwol, Anton Bruckner 1824–1896 – Leven en werken, uitg. Thoth, Bussum, Netherlands, 2012. ISBN 978-90-6868-590-9
- Anton Bruckner - Sämtliche Werke, Band XXV: Das Kitzler Studienbuch (1861–1863), facsimile, Musikwissenschaftlicher Verlag der Internationalen Bruckner-Gesellschaft, Paul Hawkshaw and Erich Wolfgang Partsch (Editors), Vienna, 2015
