= Overture (Bruckner) =

1862–63 G minor overture by Anton Bruckner

Overture in G minor
- by Anton Bruckner
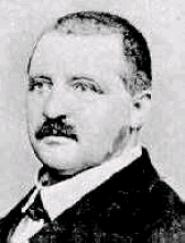
- The composer, c. 1860
- Key: G minor
- Catalogue: WAB 98
- Composed: November 1862 – 22 January 1863: Linz
- Performed: 8 September 1921: Klosterneuburg
- Recorded: c. 1937
- Instrumental: Orchestra

Anton Bruckner composed the Overture in G minor, WAB 98 in 1862–63, during his tuition by Otto Kitzler.

== History ==
In the fall of 1862, when studying with Otto Kitzler in Linz, Bruckner composed his first orchestral compositions: the Four Orchestral Pieces (the March in D minor and the Three Pieces for orchestra). His next orchestral composition was an Overture in G minor, WAB 98.

A sketch of the Overture, which was started in November 1862, is found in the Kizler-Studienbuch pp. 287–301. A first version of the Overture was completed on 24 December 1862. On 6 January 1863 Bruckner started with the composition of a new coda, which he finished on 22 January 1863.

The original manuscript of the Overture contains both the 1863 version and, on pp. 44–50, its 1862 coda. The manuscript, of which sheet No. 7 (bars 188-212) is missing, is stored in the archive of the Kremsmünster Abbey.
A copy of the complete score of the Overture was given by Bruckner to his friend Cyrill Hynais, together with that of the Four Orchestral Pieces and the Symphony in F minor. These scores are stored in the archive of the Stadt- und Landesbibliothek of Vienna.

The work was first published by Alfred Orel in Unbekannte Frühwerke Anton Bruckners, 1921. The Overture was first performed by Franz Moißl on 8 September 1921 in Klosterneuburg.

The Overture in G minor (Ouvertüre g-Moll), as well as its 1862 coda, are edited in Band XII/5 of the current Bruckner's Gesamtausgabe.

== Setting ==
The orchestral setting is the same as that of the earlier March in D minor, except that the second flute is replaced by a piccolo.

The first (1862) version of the Overture in G minor, which is 301-bar long, had a different coda on bars 233–288. This was replaced—and approved by Kitzler—with a new coda in the final version of 1863. The final version is 8 bars shorter (293 bars). The "coda of the coda" (bars 289–301 of the 1862 version / bars 281–293 of the 1863 version) is the same in both versions.

After an introduction in Adagio (bars 1-22), the work in Allegro non troppo is further in sonata form, with the use in its development of theme inversion. In contrast with the earlier Four Orchestral Pieces and the next Symphony in F minor, the Overture appears a much more mature work. Bruckner's characteristics are already present: the opening subject with his octave leap in unison, the full orchestral chords followed by semiquaver runs, and the second slower (Un poco meno mosso) subject with its large interval leaps.

== Discography ==
The first recording occurred in 1937 by Sir Henry Wood with the Queen's Hall Orchestra (78 rpm: Decca Album No. 7). A digitalisation of this recording can be heard on John Berky's website.

=== 1862 version ===
There is a single recording of the 1862 version of the Overture:

- Shunsaki Tsutsumi, Royal Metropolitan Orchestra – CD Harmony PCDZ-1621, 1997 (with Mahler's Symphony No. 4).

A sample of this recording can be downloaded from John Berky’s site.

=== Final (1863) version ===
The 1863 version of the Overture has been recorded about twenty times, mainly as addendum to the recording of one of Bruckner's symphonies.
Five of these recordings can be downloaded from John Berky’s site.

== Sources ==
- Anton Bruckner - Sämtliche Werke, Band XII/5: Ouvertüre g-Moll (1863), Musikwissenschaftlicher Verlag der Internationalen Bruckner-Gesellschaft, Hans Jancik and Rüdiger Bornhöft (Editors), Vienna, 1996
- Anton Bruckner - Sämtliche Werke, Band XXV: Das Kitzler Studienbuch (1861-1863), facsimile, Musikwissenschaftlicher Verlag der Internationalen Bruckner-Gesellschaft, Paul Hawkshaw and Erich Wolfgang Partsch (Editors), Vienna, 2015
- Uwe Harten, Anton Bruckner. Ein Handbuch. Residenz Verlag, Salzburg, 1996. ISBN 3-7017-1030-9.
- Cornelis van Zwol, Anton Bruckner 1824–1896 – Leven en werken, uitg. Thoth, Bussum, Netherlands, 2012. ISBN 978-90-6868-590-9
