= Anton Urspruch =

German composer and pedagogue

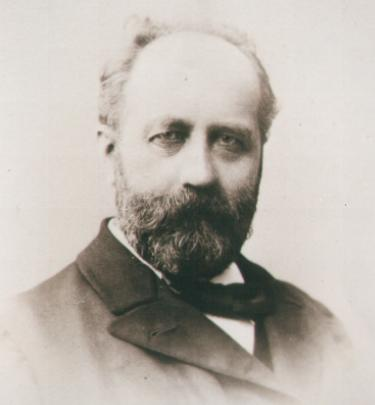
- Urspruch in 1895
- Born: 17 February 1850; Frankfurt
- Died: 11 January 1907 (aged 56); Frankfurt
- Education: Vienna Conservatory
- Occupations: Composer; Pedagogue
- Organizations: Hoch Conservatory; Raff Conservatory

Anton Urspruch (17 February 1850 – 11 January 1907) was a German composer and pedagogue who belonged to the late German Romantic era.

== Life and career ==
Urspruch was a pupil of Ignaz Lachner and Joachim Raff in Frankfurt, and later one of the favourite students of Franz Liszt in Weimar.

In 1878, he was appointed one of the first teachers at the Hoch Conservatory in Frankfurt when it opened there, teaching piano and composition and had friendly communication with Clara Schumann and Johannes Brahms. After the death in 1882 of the Conservatory director Joachim Raff, Urspruch moved to the newly founded Raff-Konservatorium in Frankfurt, where he taught until his death.

In 1883 Urspruch married Emmy Cranz, daughter of the music publisher August Cranz.

In addition to his teaching, he produced a wide variety of compositions from piano solo, solo voice, choir, chamber music up to large orchestral works as well as two operas. Many of his works had successful performances in Berlin, Hamburg, Cologne, Leipzig and Frankfurt.

In the last years of his life Urspruch was part of the revival of Gregorian Chant, having contact with the Beuron Archabbey and the cloister at Maria Laach Abbey.

In his lifetime Urspruch was highly recognised internationally as an advocate of the late romantic period. After his early death he was soon forgotten.

== Works ==
- Der Sturm (opera), after William Shakespeare: The Tempest, Frankfurt, 1888
- Das Unmöglichste von Allem (comic opera), after Lope de Vega: El mayor imposible (The most imposible thing of all), Karlsruhe, 1897
- Piano Concerto in E-flat major, Op. 9 (1882) (ded. Raff)
- Symphony in E-flat major, Op. 14
- Piano Quintet
- Piano Trio
- Violin Sonata
- Cello Sonata in D major, Op. 29
- Sonata quasi fantasia, for piano 4 hands
- German Dances for two pianos

== Recordings ==
Few of Urspruch's works are commercially available. Some of his songs have been released by the German label MDG (opp. 6, 8, 23 & 25), whilst the E flat major Symphony and the Piano Concerto have been recorded and released on CPO 555194. The pianist Ana-Marija Markovina has recorded his complete piano music for the label Genuin. His opera Das Unmöglichste von Allem was recorded live in 2012, conducted by Israel Yinon and released by the Naxos label in 2013. In September 2018, Urspruch's Piano Concerto in E flat major, opus 9, was released on Hyperion's 'The Romantic Piano Concerto' series (volume 77).

== Writings ==
- Urspruch, Anton. Der gregorianische Choral, 1901

== Literature ==
- Peter Cahn: Das Hoch'sche Konservatorium in Frankfurt am Main (1878–1978), Frankfurt am Main: Kramer, 1979.
- Baker's Biographical Dictionary of Musicians, (Nicolas Slonimsky, Ed.) New York: G. Schirmer, 1958.
