= Ana-Marija Markovina =

Croatian classical pianist

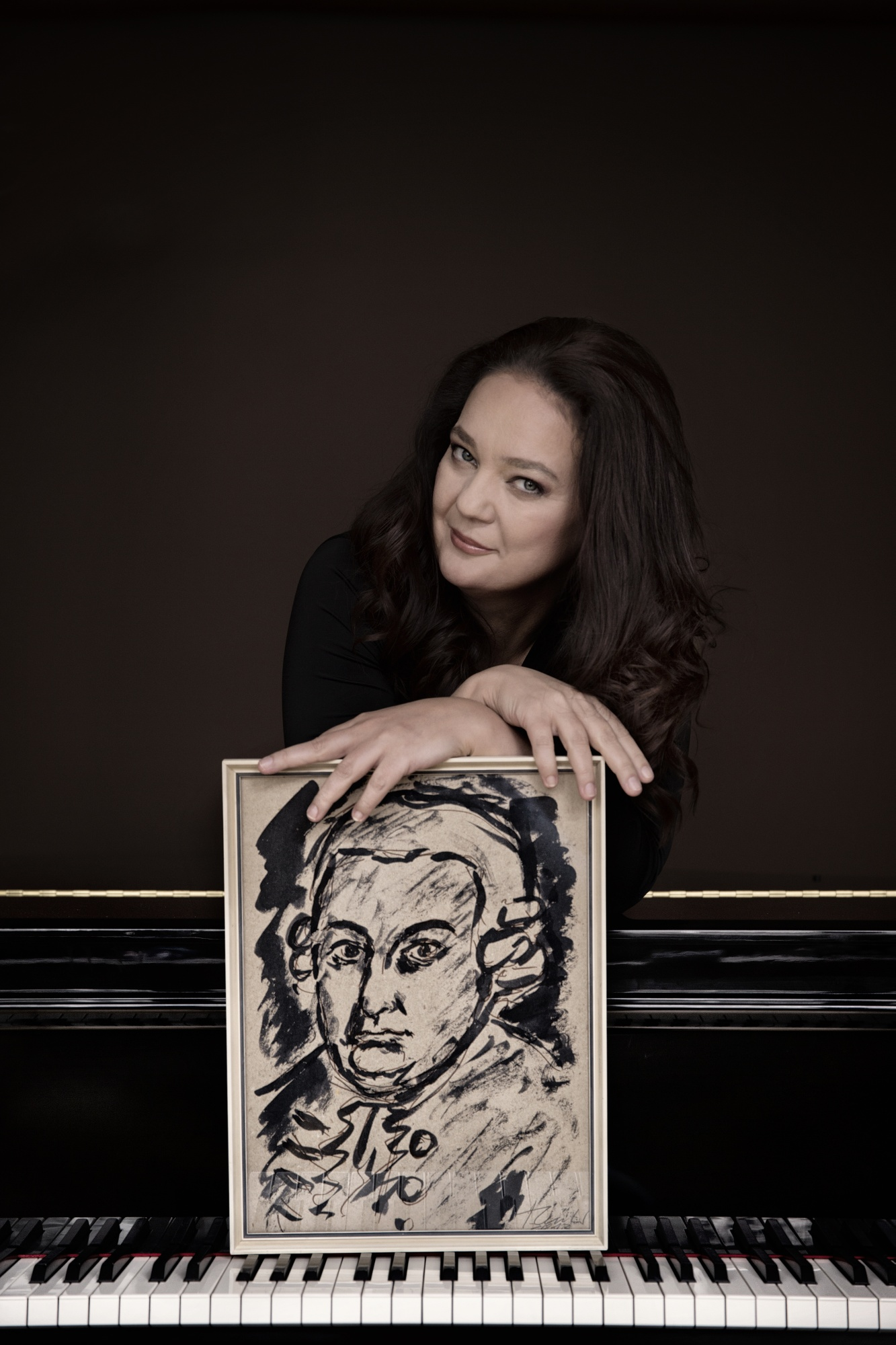

Ana-Marija Markovina (born in Osijek, 24 April 1970) is a Croatian classical pianist. She lives in Cologne with her husband, the psychologist Helmut Reuter, and their daughter.

== Life ==
Ana-Marija Markovina was born in Osijek, Croatia. She received her first music lessons at the age of five, after her parents recognized her musical talent. She would go on to study at the Hochschule für Musik Detmold and Weimar. Her teachers include Vitaly Margulis, Anatol Ugorski, and Paul Badura-Skoda. She completed her studies at the Hochschule für Musik "Hanns Eisler" in Berlin with the concert exam jury. Following graduation, Ana-Marija gave a series of important guest performances at the Bachtage Ansbach, the Bachfest Hamburg, the Beethovenfest Bonn, Schleswig-Holstein Music Festival, the Klavier-Festival Ruhr, the European Weeks Festival, Passau, the Carl Philipp Emanuel Bach Festival in Frankfurt an der Oder, the International Piano Stars Festival in Latvia and the International Piano Festival in Yokohama.

Ana-Marija has also performed with the New Japan Philharmonic Orchestra, the Oulu Symphony Orchestra in Finland, The Romanian Broadcast Orchestra, the New Philharmonic Westphalia and the Kieler Philharmonic Orchestra, among others.

She has performed as soloist throughout Europe and many other cities in Central America, North America and Asia, including the Berlin Philharmonie, the Konzerthaus Berlin, the Laeiszhalle Hamburg, the Beethovenhalle in Bonn, The Meistersingerhalle Nürnberg, the Liederhalle Stuttgart, the Herkulessaal in Munich, the Philharmony in Kaliningrad, the Minato Mirai Hall in Yokohama, the Kitara in Sapporo, Kyoto concert Hall, St. John's London and the Konzertverein Wien.

Markovina together with Professor Dr. Helmuth Reuter prepare and hold a series of lectures entitled "Music and Psychology", about the cultural and psychological significance of music in the spirit of times.

== Repertoire ==
In addition to works by composers such as Domenico Scarlatti, Salieri, Clementi, Rossini, Respighi, Mozart, Beethoven, Schubert, Felix Mendelssohn, Robert Schumann, Chopin, Liszt, Mussorgsky, Grieg, Shostakovich, Rachmaninov, Tchaikovsky, Dora Pejačević and Viktor Ullmann, Ana-Marija Markovina is known for rediscovering rare piano music from the 18th – early 20th centuries, and has performed and recorded major cycles featuring the music of Carl Philipp Emanuel Bach, Luise Adolpha Le Beau, Hugo Wolf, Anton Urspruch in addition to works by contemporary composers. In 2018 she premiered thirteen previously unpublished piano works from Bruckner's Kitzler Study Book.

Special and long-term projects have included the works of Carl Philipp Emanuel Bach. Working under the auspices of the Packard Humanities Institute in Los Altos (USA), which is currently preparing the first complete edition of the composer's works, Ana-Marija had access to a number of previously unpublished scores and manuscripts to facilitate her recording of the complete C. P. E. Bach piano works, released by Hänssler CLASSIC. Her recording received numerous critical accolades and awards including the Preis der Deutschen Schallplattenkritik (Bestenliste 2/2014) and Choc de Classica (magazine) (September 2014).

== Discography (selected) ==
- Carl Philipp Emanuel Bach: Gesamteinspielung des Klavierwerks. (hänssler CLASSIC, 2014, 098.003, 26 CD-Box)
- Richard Wagner: Parsifal für Klavier 4-händig. (Ana-Marija Markovina & Cord Garben, Gramola, 2012)
- Anton Urspruch: Gesamtwerk für Klavier, Volume 1. (Genuin, Leipzig 2011)
- Luise Adolpha Le Beau: Gesamtwerk für Klavier. (Genuin, Leipzig 2010)
- Carl Philipp Emanuel Bach: Die Preußischen Sonaten. (Genuin, Leipzig 2008)
- Hugo Wolf: Klavierwerke. (Genuin, Leipzig 2007)
- Robert Schumann: Kreisleriana op. 16, Papillons op. 2, Fantasiestücke op. 111. (Alfredo Lasheras Hakobian / Holger Busse, Genuin, Leipzig 2006)
- Carl Philipp Emanuel Bach: Die Württembergischen Sonaten. (Alfredo Lasheras Hakobian / Holger Busse, Genuin, Leipzig 2005)
- Robert Schumann: Kammermusik. (Robert-Schumann-Quartett und Ana-Marija Markovina, 115 min, Sony, 2004)
- Anton Urspruch: Complete Piano Works. (Hänssler, Neuhausen, 2017)
- Anton Bruckner (1824–1896): Piano Works (Hänssler Classic, HC17054, 2018)
- Felix Mendelssohn Complete Piano Works (Hänssler Classic, HC18043, 2022)
