= Abendklänge, WAB 110 =

Abendklänge
- by Anton Bruckner
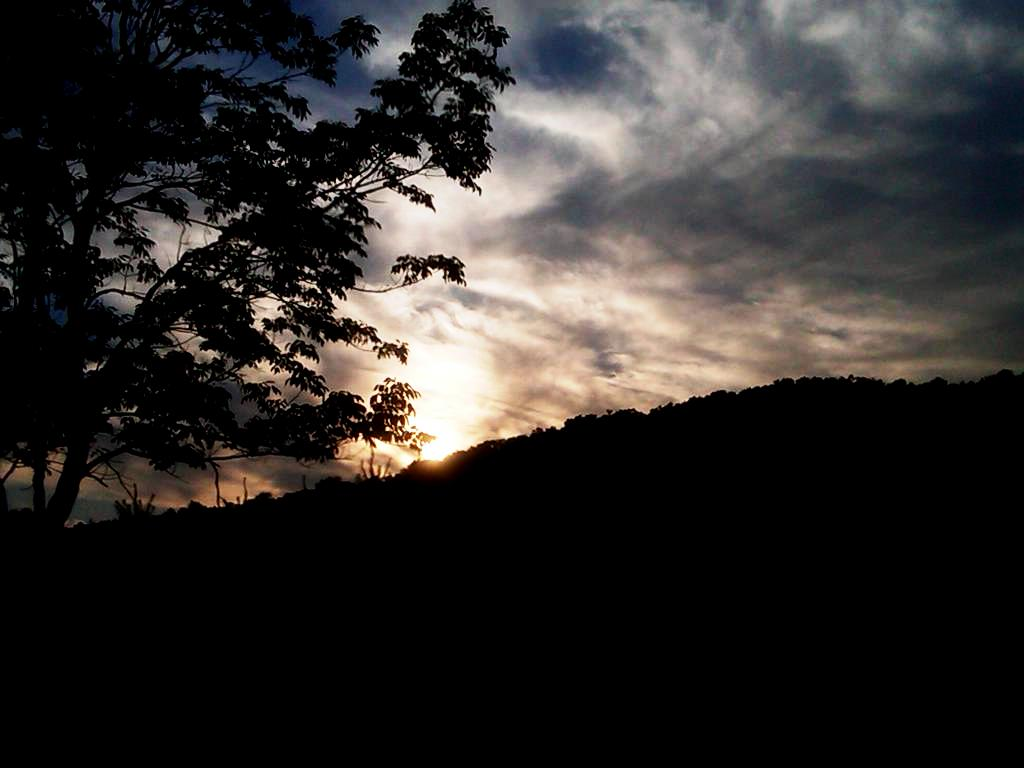
- Key: E minor
- Catalogue: WAB 110
- Form: Character piece
- Composed: 7 June 1866: Linz
- Dedication: Hugo von Grienberger
- Instrumental: Violin and piano

Abendklänge (Evening sounds), WAB 110, is a character piece for violin and piano, which Anton Bruckner composed in 1866.

== History ==
Bruckner composed the piece on 7 June 1866. He dedicated it to Hugo von Grienberger, a civil servant in the district court. It is not known when the piece was performed.

The original manuscript is stored in the archive of the Österreichische Nationalbibliothek. A facsimile of it was first published in Band I, pp. 104–105 of the Göllerich/Auer biography. The work is issued in Gesamtausgabe, Band XII/7.

== Music ==
The 36-bar long work in E minor is scored for violin and piano. Of the 36 bars only 14 (bars 17-20 and 23-32) are played by the violin.

== Discography ==
There are three recordings of Abendklänge:

- Josef Sabaini (violin), Thomas Kerbl (piano), Anton Bruckner Chöre/Klaviermusik – CD: LIVA 034, 2009
- Wolfgang Göllner (violin), Albert Sassmann (piano), 5 aus Österreich – CD: KKV Records
- Alexander Knaak (violin), Daniel Linton-France (piano) in: Bruckner, Anton – Böck liest Bruckner II – CD: Gramola 99237, 2020

== Sources ==
- August Göllerich, Anton Bruckner. Ein Lebens- und Schaffens-Bild, c. 1922 – posthumous edited by Max Auer by G. Bosse, Regensburg, 1932
- Anton Bruckner – Sämtliche Werke, Band XII/7: Abendklänge for violin and piano, Musikwissenschaftlicher Verlag der Internationalen Bruckner-Gesellschaft, Walburga Litschauer (editor), Vienna, 1995
- Cornelis van Zwol, Anton Bruckner 1824–1896 – Leven en werken, uitg. Thoth, Bussum, Netherlands, 2012. ISBN 978-90-6868-590-9
- Uwe Harten, Anton Bruckner. Ein Handbuch. Residenz Verlag, Salzburg, 1996. ISBN 3-7017-1030-9.
- Crawford Howie, Anton Bruckner - A documentary biography, online revised edition
