= Symphony in F minor (Bruckner) =

Symphony by Anton Bruckner

- by Anton Bruckner
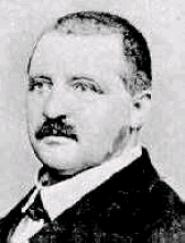
- A portrait of Anton Bruckner, c. 1860
- Key: F minor
- Catalogue: WAB 99
- Composed: 1863
- Published: 1973 (ed. Leopold Nowak)
- Recorded: 1972 Elyakum Shapirra, London Symphony Orchestra
- Movements: 4

Premiere
- Date: 12 October 1924
- Location: Klosterneuburg
- Conductor: Franz Moissl

At the end of his study period in form and orchestration by Otto Kitzler, Anton Bruckner made on 7 January 1863 sketches for a Symphony in D minor, WAB add 244.
Bruckner did not go on with this project, but composed later in the same year (between 15 February and 26 May) the Symphony in F minor, WAB 99.

Bruckner gave the score of the Symphony in F minor to his friend Cyrill Hynais, together with that of the Four Orchestral Pieces of 1862 and the Overture in G minor. The symphony, which was not played in Bruckner's lifetime, received its first full performance at Klosterneuburg on 12 October 1924. It is available in an edition by Leopold Nowak, published in 1973.

== Instrumentation ==
The work is scored for two flutes, two oboes, two clarinets in B♭, two bassoons, four horns (two in F, two in B♭), two trumpets in F, alto, tenor and bass trombones, timpani and strings.

== Movements ==
There are four movements:

1. Allegro molto vivace,
2. Andante molto,, E♭ major
3. Scherzo, Schnell, 3/4, C minor, with Trio, Langsamer, in A♭ major
4. Allegro,, F minor to F major

== Criticism ==
Biographer Derek Watson says that compared to the Overture in G minor, the F minor Symphony "is certainly thematically uninspired and less characterful," but that it does have "some moments of warm melodiousness and consistently fine if unoriginal scoring." Also, the score is quite lacking in dynamics and phrasing marks compared to Bruckner's later works.

As Leopold Nowak also writes:

Much about the work betrays the style of the times, but Bruckner’s own mode of expression can already be recognized in a number of other traits. The composer's teacher Otto Kitzler wrote the work off as "not particularly inspired", which was why Bruckner laid it aside. Fortunately, however, he did not destroy it when later screening his manuscripts.

Bruckner's F-minor symphony of 1863 was initially designated Symphony No. 1, and, in a letter to his friend Rudolf Weinwurm dated 29 January 1865, Bruckner described the C-minor symphony he was working on at the time as his Symphony No. 2. Later Bruckner decided to leave the F-minor symphony unnumbered, and he called the C-minor symphony of 1865–66 his Symphony No. 1.

Kitzler's criticism, which led Bruckner to label the symphony "Schularbeit" (schoolwork), led Georg Tintner to "wonder whether he [Kitzler] had a good look at the Scherzo." Tintner considers the Finale of the work to be the weakest of the four movements. In the words of David Griegel, "Like many other composers, I believe Bruckner was merely being too self-critical, and the unnumbered symphonies are also works worthy of our enjoyment".

== Chronology ==
Scholars at first believed that the next symphony Bruckner wrote was the so-called Symphony "No. 0", so that this symphony is sometimes called Symphony No. 00 in F minor. In any case, musicologists are sure now that the next symphony Bruckner wrote after this one was Symphony No. 1 in C minor. Together with the Linz version of Symphony No. 1, the Study Symphony was not written in Vienna like all Bruckner's other symphonies.

== Recordings ==
The first commercial recording, and apparently the first modern performance, was made by Elyakum Shapirra with the London Symphony Orchestra for EMI in 1972.

The first recording available on compact disc, was by Eliahu Inbal and the Frankfurt Radio Symphony on the Teldec label in 1991; lasting 47 minutes. Inbal's recording appears slow compared to Tintner's 37-minute recording with the Royal Scottish National Orchestra on Naxos (which is paired with the "Volksfest" Finale of Symphony No. 4 in E♭ major). Tintner skips the exposition repeats in the first and fourth movements, and occasionally dials down brass dynamics.

Stanisław Skrowaczewski's 2001 recording with the Saarbrücken Radio Symphony Orchestra on Arte Nova/Oehms Classics, which also skips the exposition repeats in the first and fourth movements, lasts 36 minutes. More recently, Gerd Schaller's live recording with the Philharmonie Festiva (Ebrach Summer Music Festival, 7 June 2015) uses the original setting, i.e. with the repeats in the first, second and fourth movements (Profil CD PH 15004, lasting 43 minutes).

The scherzo has been transcribed for organ and is available on a Novalis CD.
