= Anton Bruckner =

Austrian composer (1824–1896)

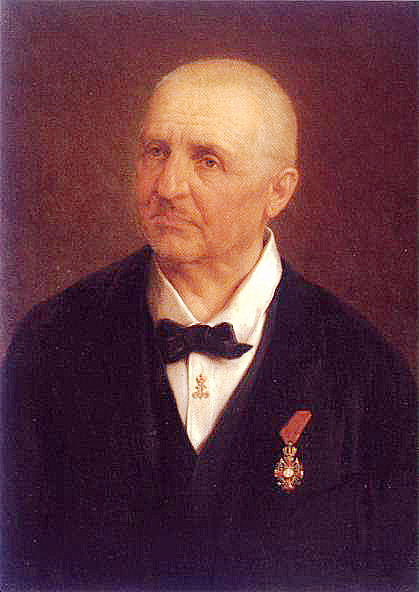
- Bruckner wearing the badge of the Order of Franz Joseph
- Born: 4 September 1824; Ansfelden, Austrian Empire
- Died: 11 October 1896 (aged 72); Vienna, Austria-Hungary
- Occupations: Composer, organist
- Works: List of compositions
- Awards: Order of Franz Joseph

Joseph Anton Bruckner (/ˈbrʊknər/; German: [ˈantoːn ˈbʁʊknɐ]; 4 September 1824 – 11 October 1896) was an Austrian composer and organist best known for his symphonies and sacred music, which includes Masses, Te Deum and motets. The symphonies are considered emblematic of the final stage of Austro-German Romanticism because of their rich harmonic language, strongly polyphonic character, and considerable length. Bruckner's compositions helped to define contemporary musical radicalism, owing to their dissonances, unprepared modulations, and roving harmonies.

Unlike other musical radicals such as Richard Wagner and Hugo Wolf, Bruckner showed respect, even humility, before other famous musicians, Wagner in particular. This apparent dichotomy between Bruckner the man and Bruckner the composer hampers efforts to describe his life in a way that gives a straightforward context for his music. The German conductor Hans von Bülow described him as "half genius, half simpleton". Bruckner was critical of his own work and often reworked his compositions. There are several versions of many of his works.

His works, the symphonies in particular, had detractors, most notably the influential Austrian critic Eduard Hanslick and other supporters of the German composer Johannes Brahms, who pointed to their large size and use of repetition, as well as to Bruckner's propensity for revising many of his works, often with the assistance of colleagues, and his apparent indecision about which versions he preferred. On the other hand, Bruckner was greatly admired by subsequent composers, including his friend Gustav Mahler.

== Life and career ==
=== Early life ===
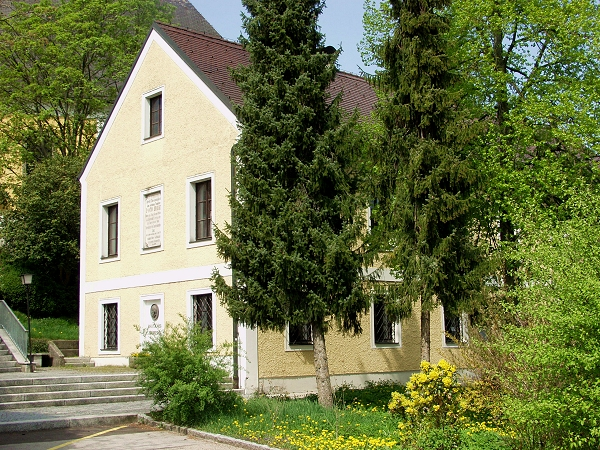
The house in Ansfelden, Austria, where Anton Bruckner was born. It is now the Anton Bruckner Museum.

Anton Bruckner was born in Ansfelden (then a village, now almost a suburb of Linz) on 4 September 1824. The ancestors of Bruckner's family were farmers and craftsmen; their history can be traced as far back as the 16th century. They lived near a bridge south of Sindelburg, which led to their being called "Bruckhner an der Bruckhen" (bridgers on the bridge). Bruckner's grandfather was appointed schoolmaster in Ansfelden in 1776; this position was inherited by Bruckner's father, Anton Bruckner Sr., in 1823. It was a poorly paid but well-respected position in the rural environment. Bruckner Sr. married Theresia Helm, and they had eleven children, five of whom survived to adulthood, Anton Bruckner being the eldest.

Music was part of the school curriculum, and Bruckner's father was his first music teacher. Bruckner learned to play the organ as a child. He was very dedicated to the instrument just as he was later in life in composing, often practising for 12 hours a day. He entered school when he was six, proved to be a hard-working student, and was promoted to upper class early. While studying, Bruckner also helped his father in teaching the other children. After Bruckner received his confirmation in 1833, Bruckner's father sent him to another school in Hörsching. The schoolmaster, Johann Baptist Weiß, was a music enthusiast and respected organist. Here, Bruckner completed his school education and refined his skills as an organist. Around 1835 Bruckner wrote his first composition, a Pange lingua – one of the compositions which he revised at the end of his life. When his father became ill, Anton returned to Ansfelden to help him in his work.

=== Teacher's education ===
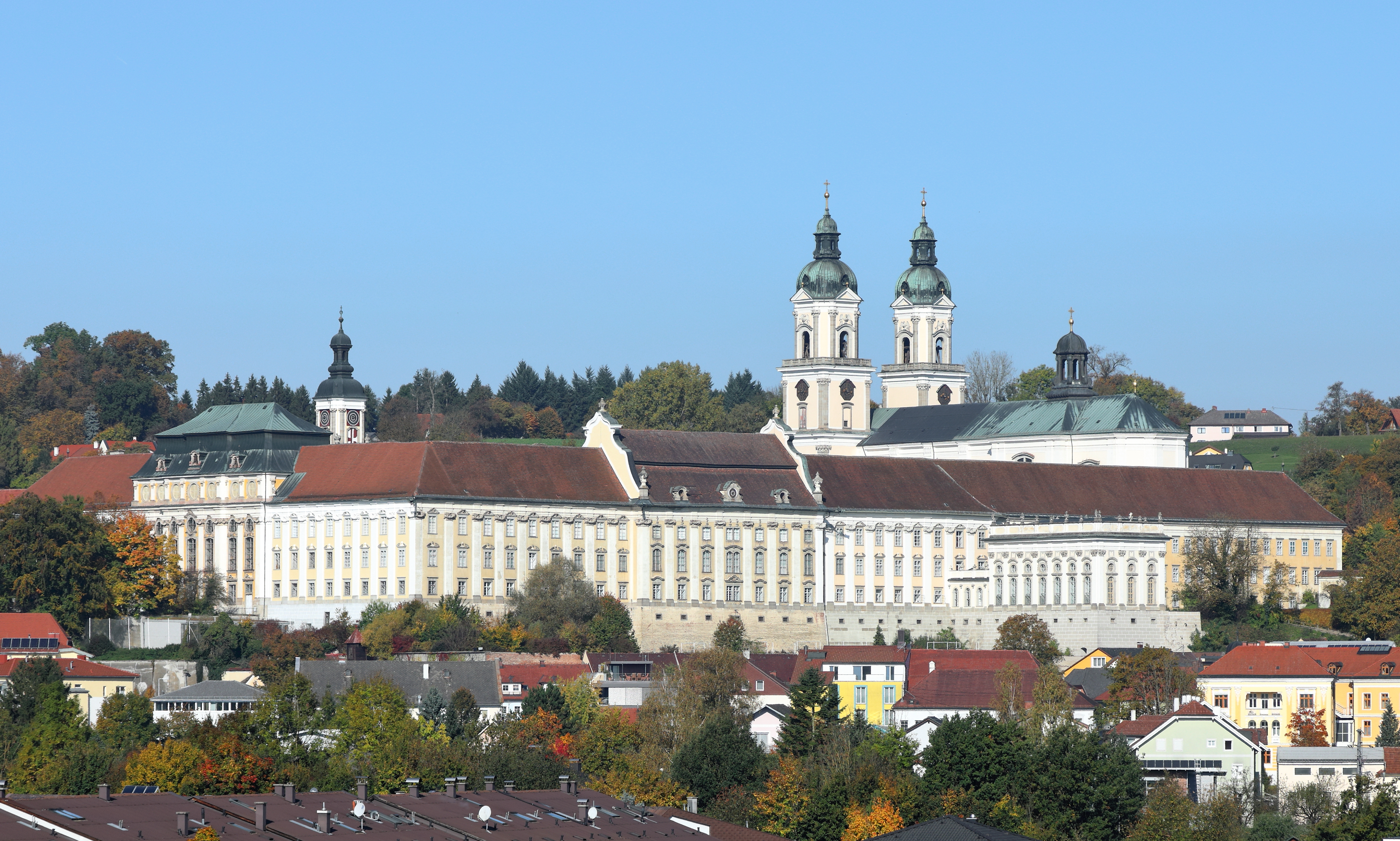
St Florian's Priory, where Bruckner lived on many occasions during his life

Bruckner's father died in 1837, when Bruckner was 13 years old. The teacher's position and house were given to a successor, and Bruckner was sent to the Augustinian monastery in Sankt Florian to become a choirboy. In addition to choir practice, his education included violin and organ lessons. Bruckner was in awe of the monastery's great organ, which was built during the late baroque era and rebuilt in 1837, and he sometimes played it during church services. From October 1840 to July 1841, Bruckner undertook further training at the teacher-training school in Linz. His teacher of harmony and choral singing was August Durrnberger, who became a friend and would later persuade Bruckner to take up the role of a cathedral organist.

After completing the seminar with an excellent grade, Bruckner was sent as an assistant teacher to a school in Windhaag. The living standards and pay were appalling and Bruckner was constantly humiliated by his superior, teacher Franz Fuchs. Despite the difficult situation, Bruckner never complained or rebelled; a belief in his own inferiority was to remain one of Bruckner's main personal traits during his whole life. He stayed at Windhaag from age 17 to 19, teaching general subjects.

Prelate Michael Arneth noticed Bruckner's bad situation in Windhaag and awarded him an assistant teacher position in the vicinity of the monastic town of Sankt Florian, sending him to Kronstorf an der Enns for two years. Here he would be able to have more of a part in musical activity. The time in Kronstorf was a much happier one for Bruckner. Between 1843 and 1845, Bruckner was the pupil of Leopold von Zenetti in Enns. Compared to the few works he wrote in Windhaag, the Kronstorf compositions from 1843 to 1845 show a significantly improved artistic ability, and finally the beginnings of what could be called "the Bruckner style". Among the Kronstorf works is the vocal piece Asperges me (WAB 4), which the young assistant teacher, out of line given his position, signed with "Anton Bruckner m.p.ria. Comp[onist]". This has been interpreted as a lone early sign of Bruckner's artistic ambitions. Otherwise, little is known of Bruckner's life plans and intentions.

=== Organist in Sankt Florian ===
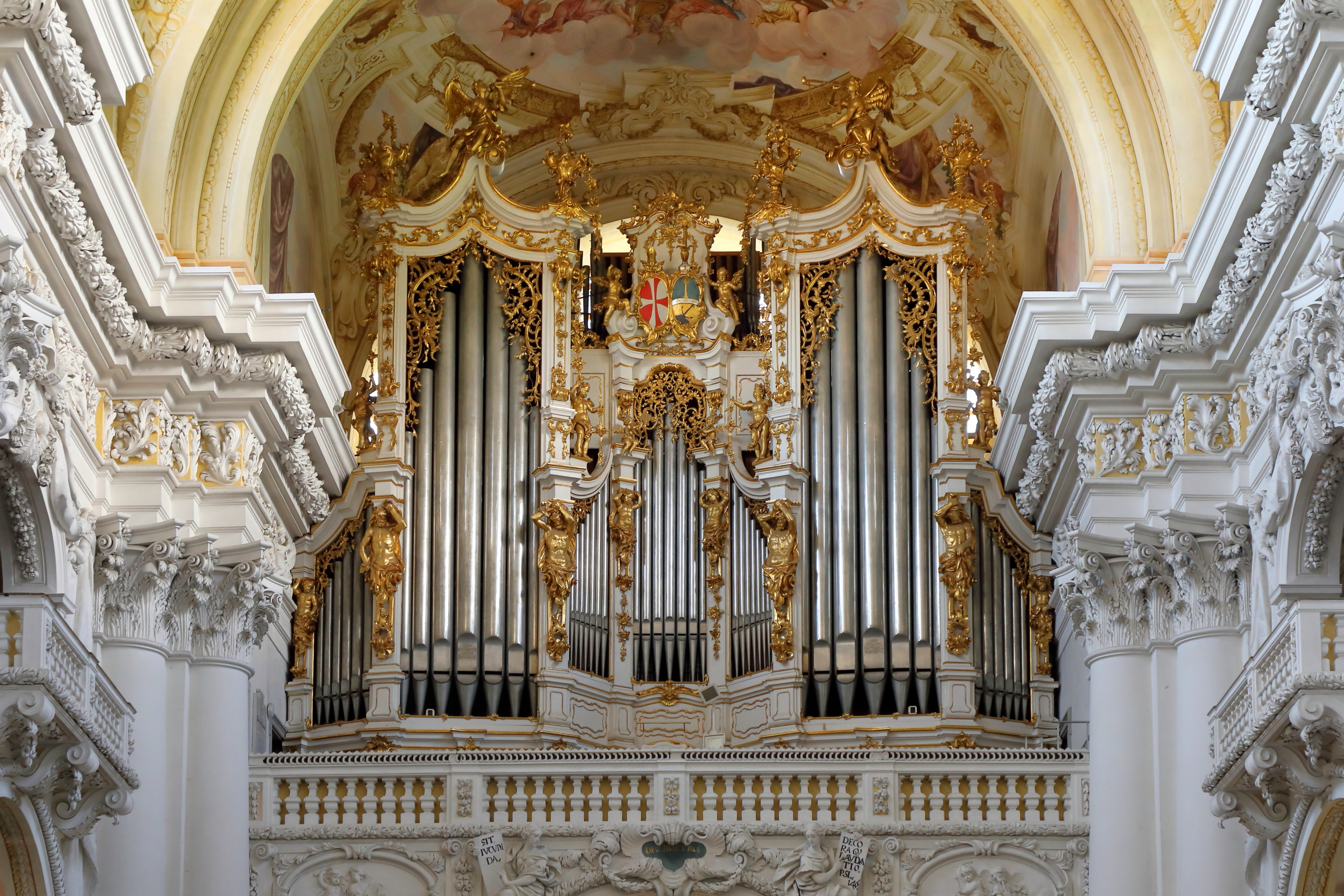
The "Bruckner Organ" in Sankt Florian

After the Kronstorf period, Bruckner returned to Sankt Florian in 1845 where, for the next 10 years, he would work as a teacher and an organist. In May 1845, Bruckner passed an examination which allowed him to work as an assistant teacher in one of the village schools of Sankt Florian. He continued to improve his education by taking further courses, passing an examination giving him permission to also teach in higher education institutes, receiving the grade "very good" in all disciplines. In 1848 Bruckner was appointed an organist in Sankt Florian and in 1851 this was made a regular position. In Sankt Florian, most of the repertoire consisted of the music of Michael Haydn, Johann Georg Albrechtsberger and Franz Joseph Aumann. During his stay in Sankt Florian, Bruckner continued to work with Zenetti.

=== Study period ===
In 1855, Bruckner, aspiring to become a student of the famous Vienna music theorist Simon Sechter, showed the master his Missa solemnis (WAB 29), written a year earlier, and was accepted. The education, which included skills in music theory and counterpoint among others, took place mostly via correspondence, but also included long in-person sessions in Vienna. Sechter's teaching would have a profound influence on Bruckner. Later, when Bruckner began teaching music himself, he would base his curriculum on Sechter's book Die Grundsätze der musikalischen Komposition (Leipzig 1853/54).

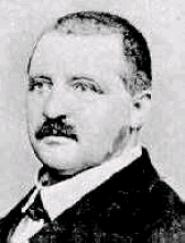
Bruckner, c. 1860

Largely self-taught as a composer, Bruckner only started composing seriously at age 37 in 1861. Bruckner studied further with Otto Kitzler, who was nine years younger than he and who introduced him to the music of Richard Wagner, which Bruckner studied extensively from 1863 onwards. Bruckner considered the earliest orchestral works (the "study" Symphony in F minor, the three orchestral pieces, the March in D minor and the Overture in G minor, which he composed in 1862–1863), mere school exercises, done under the supervision of Otto Kitzler. He continued his studies to the age of 40. Broad fame and acceptance did not come until he was over 60 (after the premiere of his Seventh Symphony in 1884). In 1861, he had already made the acquaintance of Franz Liszt, whom Bruckner idolised. Like Bruckner, Liszt was of the Catholic faith and a harmonic innovator, and, alongside Wagner, he initiated the New German School. In May 1861 he made his concert debut, as both composer and conductor of his Ave Maria, set in seven parts. Soon after Bruckner had ended his studies under Sechter and Kitzler, he wrote his Mass in D Minor. From 1861 to 1868, he alternated his time between Vienna and Sankt Florian. He wished to ensure he knew how to make his music modern, but he also wanted to spend time in a more religious setting.

=== The Vienna period ===
In 1868, after Sechter's death, Bruckner hesitantly took over his post as a teacher of music theory at the Vienna Conservatory, during which time he concentrated most of his energy on writing symphonies. These symphonies were poorly received, at times considered "wild" and "nonsensical". His students at the Conservatory included Richard Robert, Hans Rott, Felix Mottl, Heinrich Schenker, Mathilde Kralik, Franz Schalk, Joseph Schalk, and Ferdinand Löwe. His student Friedrich Klose wrote a book about his impressions of Bruckner as a composer and a teacher.

He later accepted a post at the University of Vienna in 1875, where he tried to make music theory a part of the curriculum. Overall, he was unhappy in Vienna, which was musically dominated by the critic Eduard Hanslick. At the time, there was a feud between advocates of the music of Wagner and Johannes Brahms; by aligning himself with Wagner, Bruckner made an unintentional enemy out of Hanslick. He was not without supporters, though. Deutsche Zeitung's music critic Theodor Helm, and famous conductors such as Arthur Nikisch and Franz Schalk constantly tried to bring his music to the public, and for this purpose proposed "improvements" for making Bruckner's music more acceptable to the public. Bruckner bequeathed his original scores to the Austrian National Library in Vienna.

In addition to his symphonies, Bruckner wrote Masses, motets and other sacred choral works, and a few chamber works, including a string quintet. Unlike his romantic symphonies, some of Bruckner's choral works are often conservative and contrapuntal in style; however, the Te Deum, Helgoland, Psalm 150 and at least one Mass demonstrate innovative and radical uses of chromaticism.

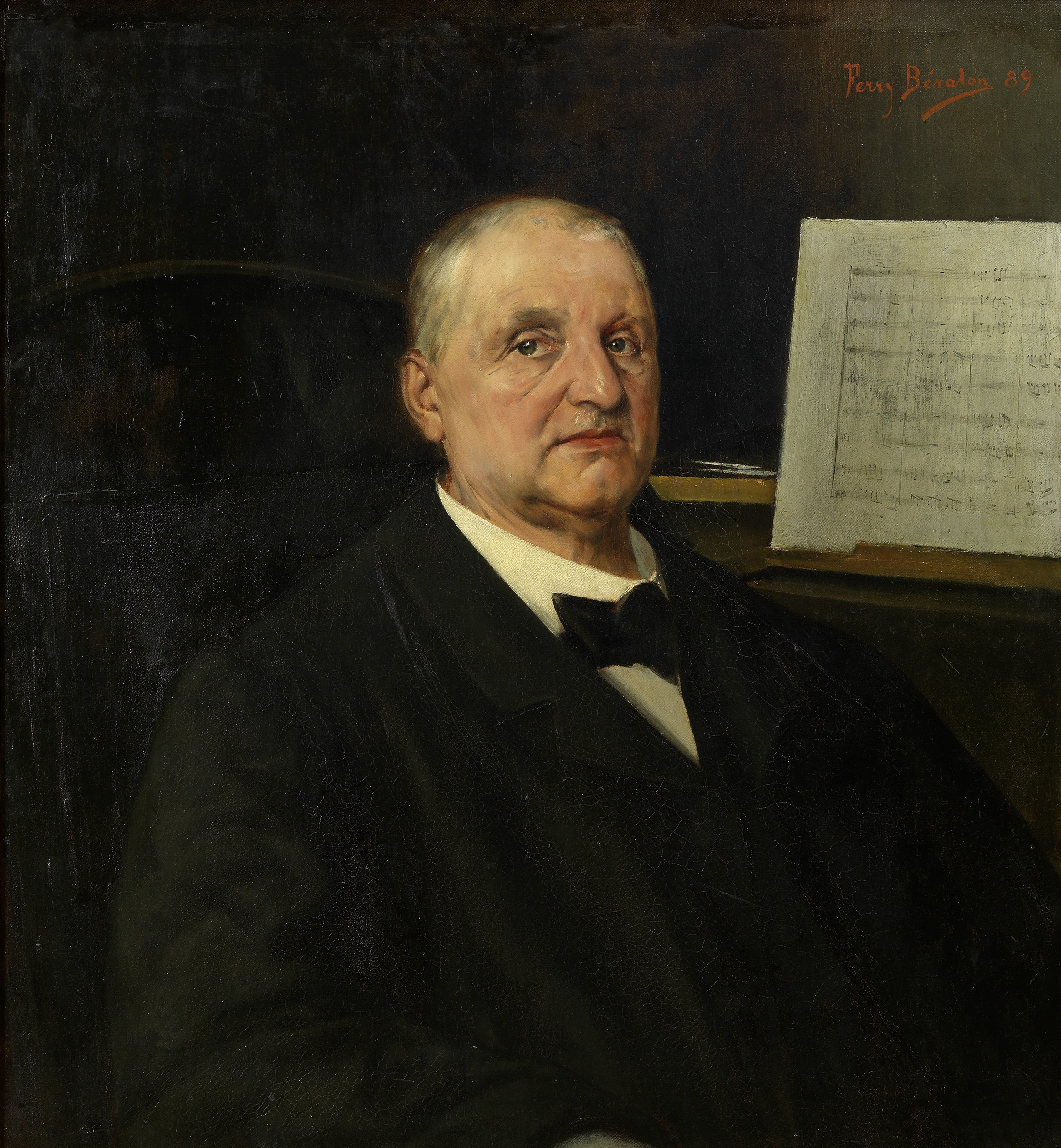
Portrait of Anton Bruckner (1889)

Biographers generally characterise Bruckner as a "simple" provincial man, and many of them have complained that there is huge discrepancy between Bruckner's life and his work. For example, Karl Grebe said: "his life doesn't tell anything about his work, and his work doesn't tell anything about his life, that's the uncomfortable fact any biography must start from." Anecdotes abound as to Bruckner's dogged pursuit of his chosen craft and his humble acceptance of the fame that eventually came his way. Once, after a rehearsal of his Fourth Symphony in 1881, the well-meaning Bruckner tipped the Austrian-Hungarian conductor Hans Richter: "When the symphony was over", Richter related, "Bruckner came to me, his face beaming with enthusiasm and joy. I felt him press a coin into my hand. 'Take this' he said, 'and drink a glass of beer to my health.'" Richter accepted the coin, a Maria Theresa thaler, and wore it on his watch-chain ever after.

Bruckner was a renowned organist in his day, impressing audiences in France in 1869, and the United Kingdom in 1871, giving six recitals on the new Royal Albert Hall Organ in London and five more at the Crystal Palace. Though he wrote no major works for the organ, his improvisation sessions sometimes yielded ideas for the symphonies. He taught organ performance at the Conservatory; amongst his students were Hans Rott and Franz Schmidt. Gustav Mahler, who called Bruckner his "forerunner", attended the conservatory at this time.

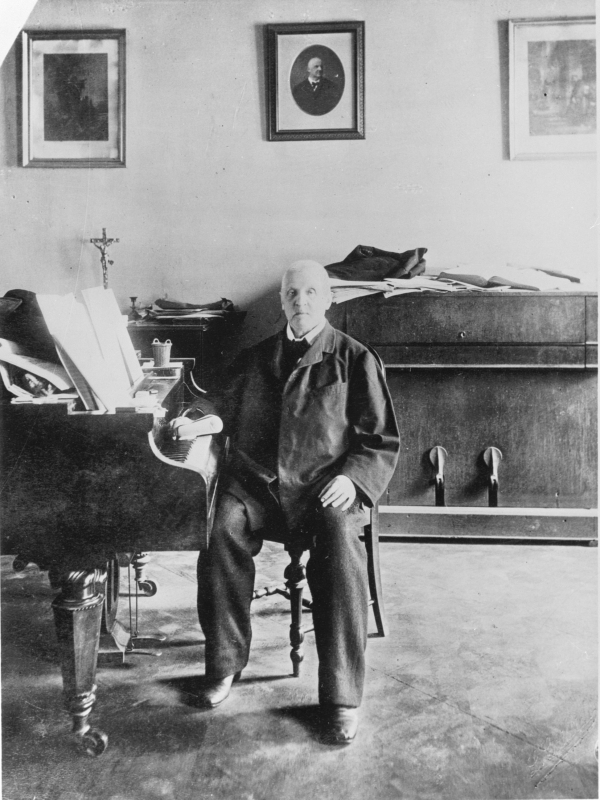
Bruckner, c. 1892

Bruckner was a lifelong bachelor who made numerous unsuccessful marriage proposals to teenage girls. One such was the daughter of a friend, called Louise; in his grief he is believed to have written the cantata Entsagen (Renunciation). His affection for teenage girls led to an accusation of impropriety where he taught music, and while he was exonerated, he decided to concentrate on teaching boys afterwards. His calendar for 1874 details the names of girls who appealed to him, and the list of such girls in all his diaries was very long. In 1880 he fell for a 17-year-old peasant girl in the cast of the Oberammergau Passion Play. His unsuccessful proposals to teenagers continued when he was past his 70th birthday; one prospect, a hotel chambermaid in Berlin named Ida Buhz, came near to marrying him but broke off the engagement when she refused to convert to Catholicism. He suffered from periodic attacks of depression, with his numerous failed attempts to find a female companion only adding to his unhappiness.

In July 1886, the Emperor decorated him with the Order of Franz Joseph. He most likely retired from his position at the University of Vienna in 1892, at the age of 68. He wrote a great deal of music that he used to help teach his students.

Bruckner died in Vienna in 1896 at the age of 72. He is buried in the crypt of the monastery church at Sankt Florian, immediately below his favorite organ. He had always had a fascination with death and dead bodies, and left explicit instructions regarding the embalming of his corpse.

The Anton Bruckner Private University for Music, Drama, and Dance, an institution of higher education in Linz, close to his native Ansfelden, was named after him in 1932 (as the "Bruckner Conservatory Linz" until 2004). The Bruckner Orchestra Linz was also named in his honor.

== Compositions ==
Sometimes Bruckner's works are referred to by WAB numbers, from the Werkverzeichnis Anton Bruckner, a catalogue of Bruckner's works edited by Renate Grasberger.

=== Symphonies ===
Symphony No. 3, third movement (excerpt)

"Bruckner expanded the concept of the symphonic form in ways that have never been witnessed before or since. ... When listening to a Bruckner symphony, one encounters some of the most complex symphonic writing ever created. As scholars study Bruckner's scores they continue to revel in the complexity of Bruckner's creative logic."

Bruckner composed eleven symphonies, the first, the Study Symphony in F minor in 1863, the last, the unfinished Symphony No. 9 in D minor in 1887–96. With the exception of Symphony No. 4 (Romantic), none of Bruckner's symphonies originally had a subtitle and in the case of those that now do, the nicknames or subtitles did not originate with the composer.

==== Style ====
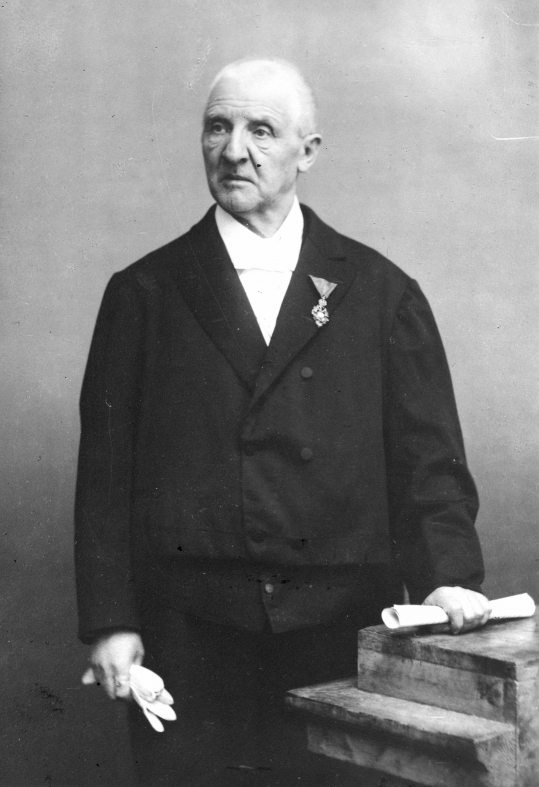
Bruckner with the Order of Franz Joseph, 1886

Bruckner's symphonies are scored for a fairly standard orchestra of woodwinds in pairs, four horns, two or three trumpets, three trombones, tuba (from the second version of the Fourth), timpani and strings. The later symphonies increase this complement, but not by much. Notable is the use of Wagner tubas in his last three symphonies. Only the Eighth has harp, and percussion besides timpani in all versions. (The Seventh, in some versions, features a single cymbal crash alongside a triangle roll at the climax of the second movement). Bruckner's style of orchestral writing was criticised by his Viennese contemporaries (Eduard Hanslick and his circle), but by the middle of the twentieth century, musicologists recognised that his orchestration was modelled after the sound of his primary instrument, the pipe organ, i.e., alternating between two groups of instruments, as when changing from one manual of the organ to another.

==== Structure ====
The structure of Bruckner's symphonies is in a way an extension of that of Beethoven's symphonies. Bruckner's symphonies are in four movements.

- The first movement, in 4/4 or 2/2, is, from Symphony No. 2 on, an allegro in modified sonata form with three thematic groups. The first group is mostly displayed in piano or pianissimo on a tremolo of the string instruments and is, after a long crescendo, repeated in tutti. The second group, melodious and in ABA' lied form, is mostly of contrapuntal structure. The third group, mostly rhythmical and often in unison, is sometimes a variant of the first group, as in Symphony No. 4. The often extensive development is followed by a modified and somewhat shortened reprise and a powerful coda.
- The second movement, mostly an adagio in 4/4, is generally in ABA′B′A″ lied form. The first thematic group, sometimes rhythmical, is developed and magnified in the third and fifth parts. The second group is mostly a melody in cantilena form. The adagio is put in third position in the first version of Symphony No. 2, and in Symphony No. 8 and Symphony No. 9.
- The scherzo in 3/4 and in minor mode is often fiery. The trio, which can be very short, is more melodious and often in Ländler form. The da capo reprise, in Bruckner's early symphonies, ends with a short, powerful coda. The revised version of the Symphony No. 4 features a scherzo – the "Hunt scherzo" – in which the outer sections are in 2/4 and in major mode.
- The Finale, in 4/4 or 2/2, is, like the first movement, an allegro in modified sonata form with three thematic groups. The first group, often a kind of introduction, is followed by a second, melodious and often contrapuntal group, and a third, rhythmical and often in unison, group, which is sometimes a variant of the first group, as in Symphony No. 2. The development, often of dramatic character, is followed by a less formal reprise, which is sometimes inverted (C′B′A') as in Symphony No. 7, and a coda in which the first thematic group of the first movement is magnified. In the coda of Symphony No. 8, the first thematic group of all four movements are magnified.

Nicholas Temperley writes in The New Grove Dictionary of Music and Musicians (1980) that Bruckner

alone succeeded in creating a new school of symphonic writing... Some have classified him as a conservative, some as a radical. Really he was neither, or alternatively was a fusion of both... [H]is music, though Wagnerian in its orchestration and in its huge rising and falling periods, patently has its roots in older styles. Bruckner took Beethoven's Ninth Symphony as his starting-point... The introduction to the first movement, beginning mysteriously and climbing slowly with fragments of the first theme to the gigantic full statement of that theme, was taken over by Bruckner; so was the awe-inspiring coda of the first movement. The scherzo and slow movement, with their alternation of melodies, are models for Bruckner's spacious middle movements, while the finale with a grand culminating hymn is a feature of almost every Bruckner symphony.

Bruckner is the first composer since Schubert about whom it is possible to make such generalizations. His symphonies deliberately followed a pattern, each one building on the achievements of its predecessors... His melodic and harmonic style changed little, and it had as much of Schubert in it as of Wagner... His technique in the development and transformation of themes, learnt from Beethoven, Liszt and Wagner, was unsurpassed, and he was almost the equal of Brahms in the art of melodic variation.

Deryck Cooke adds, also in the New Grove,

Despite its general debt to Beethoven and Wagner, the "Bruckner Symphony" is a unique conception, not only because of the individuality of its spirit and its materials, but even more because of the absolute originality of its formal processes. At first, these processes seemed so strange and unprecedented that they were taken as evidence of sheer incompetence... Now it is recognized that Bruckner's unorthodox structural methods were inevitable... Bruckner created a new and monumental type of symphonic organism, which abjured the tense, dynamic continuity of Beethoven, and the broad, fluid continuity of Wagner, in order to express something profoundly different from either composer, something elemental and metaphysical.

In a concert review Bernard Holland described parts of the first movements of Bruckner's sixth and seventh symphonies as follows: "There is the same slow, broad introduction, the drawn-out climaxes that grow, pull back and then grow some more – a sort of musical coitus interruptus."

In the 2001 second edition of the New Grove, Mark Evan Bonds called the Bruckner symphonies "monumental in scope and design, combining lyricism with an inherently polyphonic design... Bruckner favored an approach to large-scale form that relied more on large-scale thematic and harmonic juxtaposition. Over the course of his output, one senses an ever-increasing interest in cyclic integration that culminates in his masterpiece, the Symphony No. 8 in C minor, a work whose final page integrates the main themes of all four movements simultaneously."

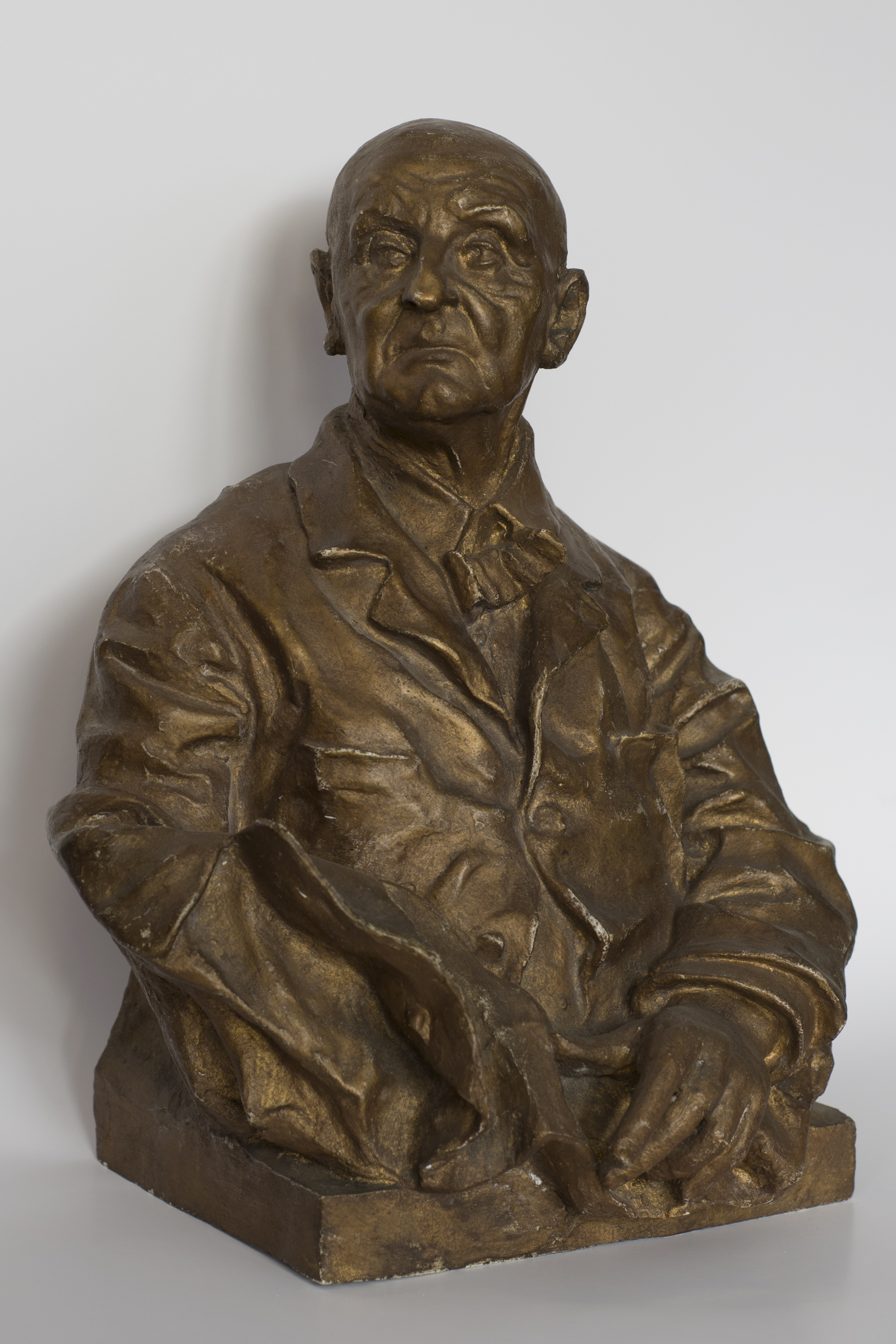
A copy of the bust of Bruckner originally by Viktor Oskar Tilgner

In 1990 the American artist Jack Ox gave a paper called "The Systematic Translation of Anton Bruckner's Eighth Symphony into a series of Thirteen Paintings" at the Bruckner Symposium in Linz Austria; here she structurally analysed all of the Eighth Symphony's themes. She then proceeded to show how she mapped this musical data into a series of twelve large, painted visualisations. The conference report was published in 1993.

==== The Bruckner Problem ====
"The Bruckner Problem" refers to the difficulties and complications resulting from the numerous contrasting versions and editions that exist for most of the symphonies. The term gained currency following the publication (in 1969) of an article dealing with the subject, "The Bruckner Problem Simplified" by the musicologist Deryck Cooke, which brought the issue to the attention of English-speaking musicians.

The revision issue has generated controversy. A common explanation for the multiple versions is that Bruckner was willing to revise his work on the basis of harsh, uninformed criticism from his colleagues. "The result of such advice was to awaken immediately all the insecurity in the non-musical part of Bruckner's personality", the musicologist Deryck Cooke writes. "Lacking all self-assurance in such matters, he felt obliged to bow to the opinions of his friends, 'the experts,' to permit ... revisions and even to help make them in some cases." This explanation was widely accepted when it was championed by the Bruckner scholar Robert Haas, who was the chief editor of the first critical editions of Bruckner's works published by the International Bruckner Society; it continues to be found in the majority of program notes and biographical sketches concerning Bruckner. Haas's work was endorsed by the Nazis and so fell out of favour after the war as the Allies enforced denazification. Haas's rival Leopold Nowak was appointed to produce a whole new critical edition of Bruckner's works. He and others such as Benjamin Korstvedt and the American conductor Leon Botstein argued that Haas's explanation is at best idle speculation, at worst a shady justification of Haas's own editorial decisions. Also, it has been pointed out that Bruckner often started work on a symphony just days after finishing the one before. As Cooke writes, "In spite of continued opposition and criticism, and many well-meaning exhortations to caution from his friends, he looked neither to right nor left, but simply got down to work on the next symphony."

The first versions of Bruckner's symphonies often presented an instrumental, contrapuntal and rhythmic complexity (Brucknerian rhythm "2 + 3", use of quintuplets), the originality of which has not been understood and which were considered unperformable by the musicians. In order to make them "performable", the symphonies, except Symphonies No. 5, No. 6 and No. 7, have been revised several times. Consequently, there are several versions and editions, mainly of Symphonies 3, 4 and 8, which have been deeply emended by Bruckner's friends and associates, and it is not always possible to tell whether the emendations had Bruckner's direct authorisation.

Looking for authentic versions of the symphonies, Robert Haas produced during the 1930s a first critical edition of Bruckner's works based on the original scores. After World War II other scholars (Leopold Nowak, William Carragan, Benjamin-Gunnar Cohrs et al.) carried on with this work.

=== Sacred choral works ===
"Ave Maria"
The second of Bruckner's three settings of "Ave Maria" performed by the United States Navy Band's Sea Chanters ensemble

Bruckner was a devoutly religious man, and composed numerous sacred works. He wrote a Te Deum, five psalm settings (including Psalm 150 in the 1890s), a Festive cantata, a Magnificat, about forty motets (among them eight settings of Tantum ergo, and three settings of both Christus factus est and Ave Maria), and at least seven Masses.

The three early Masses (Windhaager Messe, Kronstorfer Messe and Messe für den Gründonnerstag), composed between 1842 and 1844, were short Austrian Landmessen for use in local churches and did not always set all the numbers of the ordinary. His Requiem in D minor of 1849 is the earliest work Bruckner himself considered worthy of preservation. It shows the clear influence of Mozart's Requiem (also in D minor) and similar works of Michael Haydn. The seldom performed Missa solemnis, composed in 1854 for Friedrich Mayer's installation, was the last major work Bruckner composed before he started to study with Simon Sechter, with the possible exception of Psalm 146, a large work, for SATB soloists, double choir and orchestra.

The three Masses which Bruckner wrote in the 1860s and revised later on in his life are more often performed. The Masses numbered 1 in D minor and 3 in F minor are for solo singers, mixed choir, organ ad libitum and orchestra, while No. 2 in E minor is for mixed choir and a small group of wind instruments, and was written in an attempt to meet the Cecilians halfway. The Cecilians wanted to rid church music of instruments entirely. No. 3 was clearly meant for concert, rather than liturgical performance, and it is the only one of his Masses in which he set the first line of the Gloria, "Gloria in excelsis Deo", and of the Credo, "Credo in unum Deum", to music. In concert performances of the other Masses, these lines are intoned by a tenor soloist in the way a priest would, with a line of plainsong.

=== Secular vocal works ===
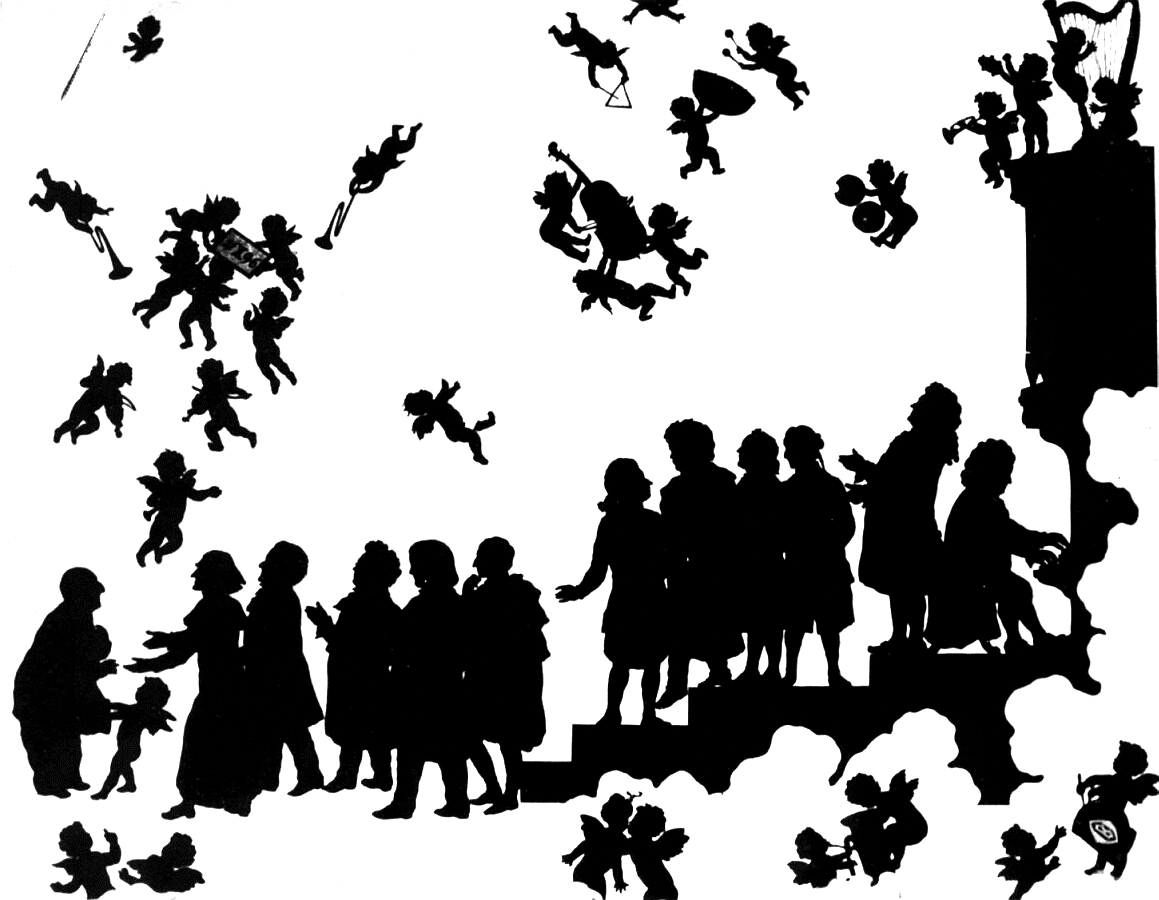
"Anton Bruckner arrives in Heaven". Bruckner is greeted by (from left to right): Liszt, Wagner, Schubert, Schumann, Weber, Mozart, Beethoven, Gluck, Haydn, Handel, Bach. (Silhouette drawing by Otto Böhler)

As a young man Bruckner sang in men's choirs and wrote music for them. Bruckner's secular choral music was mostly written for choral societies. The texts are always in German. Some of these works were written specifically for private occasions such as weddings, funerals, birthdays or name-days, many of these being dedicated to friends and acquaintances of the composer. This music is rarely performed. The biographer Derek Watson characterises the pieces for men's choir as being "of little concern to the non-German listener". Of about 30 such pieces, a most unusual and evocative composition is the song Abendzauber (1878) for men's choir, man soloist, yodelers and four horns.

Bruckner also composed 20 Lieder, of which only a few have been published. The Lieder that Bruckner composed in 1861–1862 during his tuition by Otto Kitzler have not been WAB classified. In 2013 the Austrian National Library was able to acquire a facsimile of the Kitzler-Studienbuch, the autograph manuscript hitherto unavailable to the public. The facsimile is edited by Paul Hawkshaw and Erich Wolfgang Partsch in Band XXV of Bruckner's Gesamtausgabe.

Bruckner also composed five name-day cantatas, as well as two patriotic cantatas, Germanenzug and Helgoland, on texts by August Silberstein. Germanenzug (WAB 70), composed in 1863–1864, was Bruckner's first published work. Helgoland (WAB 71), for TTBB men's choir and large orchestra, was composed in 1893 and was Bruckner's last completed composition and the only secular vocal work that he thought worthy enough to bequeath to the Austrian National Library.

=== Other works ===
During his apprenticeship with Otto Kitzler, Bruckner composed three short orchestral pieces and a March in D minor as orchestration exercises. At that time he also wrote an Overture in G minor. These works, which are occasionally included in recordings of the symphonies, already show hints of Bruckner's emerging style.

A String Quartet in C minor and the additional Rondo in C minor, also composed in 1862, were discovered decades after Bruckner's death. The later String Quintet in F Major of 1879, contemporaneous with the Fifth and Sixth symphonies, has been frequently performed. The Intermezzo in D minor, which was intended to replace its scherzo, is not frequently performed.

A Symphonisches Präludium (Symphonic Prelude) in C minor was discovered by Mahler scholar Paul Banks in the Austrian National Library in 1974 in a piano duet transcription. Banks ascribed it to Gustav Mahler, and had it orchestrated by Albrecht Gürsching. In 1985 Wolfgang Hiltl, who had retrieved the original score by Rudolf Krzyzanowski, had it published by Doblinger (issued in 2002). According to the scholar Benjamin-Gunnar Cohrs, the stylistic examination of this "prelude" shows that it is all Bruckner's. Possibly Bruckner had given a draft-score to his pupil Krzyzanowski, which already contained the string parts and some important lines for woodwind and brass, as an exercise in instrumentation.

Bruckner's Two Aequali of 1847 for three trombones are solemn, brief works. The Military march of 1865 is an occasional work as a gesture of appreciation for the Militär-Kapelle der Jäger-Truppe of Linz. Abendklänge of 1866 is a short character piece for violin and piano.

Bruckner also wrote a Lancer-Quadrille (c. 1850) and a few other small works for piano. Most of this music was written for teaching purposes. Sixteen other pieces for piano, which Bruckner composed in 1862 during his tuition by Kitzler, have not been WAB classified. A facsimile of these pieces is found in the Kitzler-Studienbuch.

Bruckner was a renowned organist at the St Florian's Priory, where he improvised frequently. Those improvisations were usually not transcribed, so that only a few of his works for organ have survived. The five Preludes in E-flat major (1836–1837), classified WAB 127 and WAB 128, as well as a few other WAB-unclassified works, which have been found in Bruckner's Präludienbuch, are probably not by Bruckner.

Bruckner never wrote an opera, and as much as he was a fan of Wagner's music dramas, he was uninterested in drama. In 1893 he thought about writing an opera called Astra based on a novel by Gertrud Bollé-Hellmund. Although he attended performances of Wagner's operas, he was much more interested in the music than the plot. After seeing Wagner's Götterdämmerung, he asked: "Tell me, why did they burn the woman at the end?" Bruckner also never wrote an oratorio.

=== Bruckner Gesamtausgabe ===
Published by Musikwissenschaftlicher Verlag in Vienna, the Bruckner Kritische Gesamtausgabe (Bruckner's Critical Complete Edition) comprises three successive editions.

- The first edition (1934–1944, Editorial Head: Robert Haas) included 'hybrid' scores for Symphonies 2 and 8 and other similar conflations for some other revised works.
- In the second edition (1951–1989, Editorial Head: Leopold Nowak) Nowak et al. went about publishing several versions of some works, in the process correcting some mistakes of Haas. After Nowak's resignation, (1990 onwards, Editorial Head: Herbert Vogg) William Carragan, Paul Hawkshaw, Benjamin-Gunnar Cohrs et al. are in the process of reviewing and further correcting the work of Haas and Nowak.
- In 2011 it was decided to issue a new edition (editorial board: Paul Hawkshaw, Thomas Leibnitz, Andreas Lindner, Angela Pachovsky, Thomas Röder), which will include the content of the current edition and integrate it with sources that had been retrieved since its publication.

== Reception in the 20th century ==
Because of the long duration and vast orchestral canvas of much of his music, Bruckner's popularity has greatly benefited from the introduction of long-playing media and from improvements in recording technology.

Decades after his death, the leadership of the Nazi Party and Nazi Germany strongly approved of Bruckner's music because they saw it as expressing the zeitgeist of the German volk, and Adolf Hitler even consecrated a bust of Bruckner in a widely photographed ceremony in 1937 at the Walhalla in Regensburg. Bruckner's music was among the most popular in Nazi Germany.

Near the end of World War II, Hitler became enamoured with Bruckner's music, and planned to convert St. Florian Monastery in Linz—where Bruckner had played the organ, and where he was buried—into a repository of Bruckner's manuscripts. Hitler evicted the monks from the monastery and personally paid for the restoration of the organ and the institution of a Bruckner study centre there. He also paid for the Haas collection of Bruckner's works to be published, and himself purchased material for the proposed library. Additionally, Hitler caused the founding of the Bruckner Symphony Orchestra, which began presenting concerts in late 1943. His plan for one of the bell towers in Linz to play a theme from Bruckner's Fourth Symphony never came to pass. The Adagio from Bruckner's Seventh Symphony was broadcast by German radio (Deutscher Reichsrundfunk) when it announced the news of Hitler's death on 1 May 1945.

Today the Brucknerhaus in Linz, which opened in 1974, is named after him.

The approval by Hitler and the Nazis of his music did not hurt Bruckner's standing in the postwar media, and several films and television productions in Europe and the United States have used excerpts from his music ever since the 1950s, as they already did in the 1930s. The Israel Philharmonic Orchestra has never banned Bruckner's music as they have Wagner's, even recording his Eighth Symphony with the Indian conductor Zubin Mehta.

Bruckner's symphonic works, much maligned in Vienna in his lifetime, now have an important place in the tradition and musical repertoire of the Vienna Philharmonic Orchestra.

=== In popular culture ===
The life of Bruckner was portrayed in Jan Schmidt-Garre's 1995 film Bruckner's Decision, which focuses on his recovery in an Austrian spa. Ken Russell's television film The Strange Affliction of Anton Bruckner, starring Peter Mackriel, also fictionalises Bruckner's real-life stay at a sanatorium because of obsessive–compulsive disorder (or 'numeromania' as it was then described).

Luchino Visconti used Bruckner's music for his film Senso (1954), its plot concerned with the war Italy waged against Austria in 1866. The score by Carl Davis for the restoration of the 1925 film Ben-Hur takes "inspiration from Bruckner to achieve reverence in biblical scenes."

== See also ==
- Bruckner Orchestra Linz
- Friedrich Eckstein
- International Bruckner Society
- List of Austrians in music
