= Otto Kitzler =

German cellist and conductor

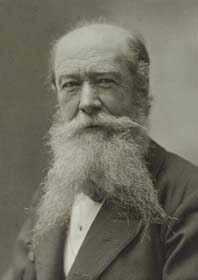
Otto Kitzler

Otto Kitzler (18 March 1834 – 6 September 1915) was a German cellist and conductor. He is noted for being the form and orchestration teacher of the Austrian composer Anton Bruckner from 1861 to 1863.

Kitzler led the Linz theatre orchestra and was responsible for introducing Bruckner to the music of Richard Wagner as well as other 19th-century composers. The sketches and compositions that Bruckner prepared for Kitzler are found in the Kitzler-Studienbuch, which "due to its inaccessibility...has achieved little notoriety in the musical world".

Kitzler wrote a funeral music "In Memorial of Anton Bruckner" (Trauermusik "Dem Andenken Anton Bruckners"), re-orchestrated by Gerd Schaller (2012) and recorded with the Philharmonie Festiva for Profil Edition Günter Hänssler.
