= Requiem (Bruckner) =

Musical setting by Anton Bruckner

- by Anton Bruckner
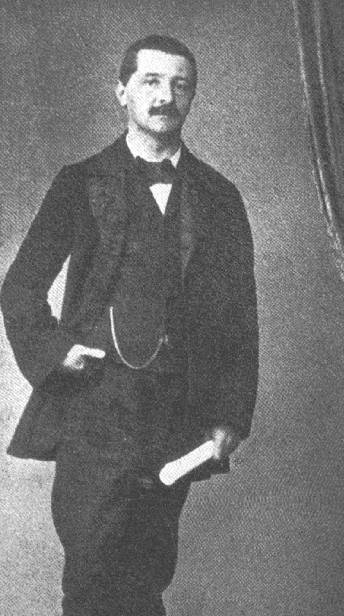
- The young Bruckner
- Key: D minor
- Catalogue: WAB 39
- Form: Missa pro defunctis
- Dedication: In memory of Franz Sailer
- Performed: 15 September 1849: St. Florian Monastery
- Published: 1930
- Recorded: 1970
- Movements: 6
- Vocal: SATB choir and soloists
- Instrumental: orchestra and organ

The Requiem in D minor, WAB 39, is a Missa pro defunctis composed by Anton Bruckner in 1849.

== History ==
The Requiem in D minor, a setting of the Missa pro defunctis for mixed choir, vocal soloists, three trombones, one horn, strings and organ with figured bass, was composed by Bruckner in memory of Franz Sailer, the notary of the St. Florian Monastery, who bequeathed Bruckner a Bösendorfer piano. The Requiem was premiered on 15 September 1849 in the St. Florian Monastery, a year after Sailer's death. A second performance occurred on 11 December 1849 in the Abbey of Kremsmünster. The manuscript is archived in the St. Florian Monastery.

In 1892, Bruckner revised the score and gave it to Franz Bayer. Bayer performed it on 4 December 1895 in Steyr for the funerals of parish priest Johann Evangelist Aichinger. The Österreichische Nationalbibliothek acquired the revised score from Bayer's widow in 1923.

== Setting ==
1. Introit: Requiem – Andante, D minor
2. Sequence: Dies irae – Allegro, D minor
3. Offertorium
  1. Domine – Andante, F major
  2. Hostias – Adagio, B♭ major: Chorale by divided man voices and trombones
  3. Quam olim – Con spirito, F minor: Double fugue, ending in F major
4. Sanctus – Andante, D minor
5. Benedictus – Andante, B♭ major - a solo horn replaces the bass trombone
6. Agnus Dei and Communion
  1. Agnus Dei – Adagio, D minor
  2. Requiem – Adagio, D minor: Chorale a cappella
  3. Cum sanctis – Alla breve, D minor, ending in D major

Total duration: about 37 minutes

The Requiem is most likely Bruckner's "first truly large-scale composition and probably his first significant work." "[It] is amazing what he achieved, especially if we look at the great double fugue of the Quam olim Abrahae, written at least six years before he even commenced his thorough contrapuntal studies with Simon Sechter!" "The Requiem was Bruckner's first larger-scale composition and also his first work with orchestra. [When reviewing it in 1892,] as a highly self-critical seventy-year-old, Bruckner passed judgement on the work as follows: Es is' net schlecht! ('It is not bad!')."

There is clear influence of Mozart throughout the work.

[There] are many passages reminiscent of what was even then, in 1848/49, a past age (the very opening points irresistibly to Mozart's Requiem in the same key), and though the very inclusion of a figured bass for organ continuo strikes one as backward looking, there are already several flashes of the later, great Bruckner to come.

[Despite it] is by no means a perfect masterpiece... [it] can be said to be the first full demonstration that the young man was a composer of inestimable promise. ... [The] expressively reticent opening of the opening of the Requiem, with his softly shifting syncopations in the strings ... already faintly anticipates one or two of his own symphonic passages in the two earlier D minor symphonies, for instance Nos. '0' and 3... [We] cannot escape the solemn beauty of this music, which already has the authentic atmosphere of natural genius.

During the years following the composition of the Requiem, Bruckner wrote a number of small choral works as well as two works on a larger canvas: a Magnificat (1852) and the Missa solemnis in B-flat minor (1854). Strangely enough these do not quite measure up to the qualities inherent in the earlier Requiem.

== Versions and editions ==
Bruckner made a slight revision of the score in 1892. He gave Franz Bayer the revised score. Bayer performed the revised work on 4 December 1895 in Steyr for the funerals of the parish priest Johann Evangelist Aichinger. The Österreichische Nationalbibliothek has acquired the revised score from Bayer's widow in 1923.

There are three different editions in the Gesamtausgabe:

- Haas edition (1930/31), together with the Missa solemnis. Haas added a lot of dynamics markings, but ignored some of Bruckner's hairpins
- Nowak edition (1966). Nowak corrected Haas' oversights but retained antique clefs for the vocal parts (different C-clefs for soprano, alto and tenor)
- Rüdiger Bornhöft edition (1998). Bornhöft modernised the clefs (treble for all but bass) and corrected minor errors.

== Selected discography ==
The Requiem remains still somewhat in the background of other Bruckner's works. Most of the about 20 recordings of it are live performances, which were not brought to the commercial market.

According to Hans Roelofs, Schönzeler's 1970 LP recording, which was a true pioneer work, has, in spite of subsequent recordings, hold his status. Matthew Best's CD recording is currently still the reference. Farnberger's recording (1997) with the St. Florianer Sängerknaben, which was recorded in the St. Florian Abbey, provides the listener with a whiff of authenticity. Out of the more recent recordings, Roelofs picks out Janssens' recording of 2006 with the Laudantes Consort, and Susana Acra-Brache's recording of 2010 with the Grupo Vocal Matisses.

- Hans-Hubert Schönzeler, Requiem & 4 Orchestral Pieces, Alexandra Choir, London Philharmonic Orchestra, Robert Munns (Organ) – LP: Unicorn UNS 210, 1970
- Hans Michael Beuerle, Requiem in D minor, Laubacher Kantorei and Instrumental-Ensemble Werner Keltsch – LP: Cantate 658 231, 1972.
  This LP has been transferred to CD: Klassic Haus KHCD 2011-092, 2011 (with Psalm 146 by Wolfgang Riedelbauch).
- Friedrich Wolf, Anton Bruckner – Requiem, Choir and Orchestra of St Augustin, Vienna, Martin Haselböck (Organ) – LP: Philips Fontana 6599 855, 1974
- Herbert Ermert, Anton Bruckner - Requiem d-Moll, Bach-Gemeinschaft Bonn, Siegerland-Orchester, Ludger Lohmann (Organ) – LP: Aulos FSM-53 552 AUL, 1980 - transferred to CD: Aulos AUL 66122 (with Cherubini's Requiem)
- Jürgen Jürgens, Anton Bruckner – Music of the St. Florian Period (II), Monteverdi-Chor, Camerata Academica Hamburg, Werner Kaufmann (Organ), 1985.
  This historical, previously not issued performance has recently been transferred to CD: BSVD-0111, 2012 (Bruckner Archive Production)
- Matthew Best, Bruckner - Requiem, Psalm 112 & Psalm 114, Corydon Singers, English Chamber Orchestra, Thomas Trotter (organ) – CD: Hyperion CDA66245, 1987
- Franz Farnberger, Anton Bruckner in St. Florian – Requiem & Motetten, St. Florianer Sängerknaben, Instrumentalensemble St. Florian, Andreas Etlinger (Organ) – CD Studio SM D2639 SM 44, 1997
- Guy Janssens, A history of the Requiem - Part III, Laudantes Consort, Benoît Mernier (Organ) – CD: Cypres CYP 1654, 2006 (with Maurice Duruflé's Requiem)
- Susana Acra-Brache, Anton Bruckner: Requiem, Ave Maria & Te Deum, Grupo Vocal Matisses and In-Art Orquestra – CD/DVD: Issue of the Ensemble Musica Sacra, 2010.
- Łukasz Borowicz, Anton Bruckner: Requiem, RIAS Kammerchor, Akademie für Alte Musik Berlin – CD: Accentus ACC30474, 2019 - Cohrs edition based on the 1849 version, 2018

== Sources ==
- Anton Bruckner, Sämtliche Werke, Kritische Gesamtausgabe – Band 15: Requiem d-Moll – Missa solemnis b-Moll, Dr. Benno Filsen Verlag GmbH, Robert Haas (Editor), Augsburg-Vienna, 1930
- Anton Bruckner: Sämtliche Werke: Band XIV: Requiem d-Moll (1849), Musikwissenschaftlicher Verlag der Internationalen Bruckner-Gesellschaft, Leopold Nowak (Editor), Vienna, 1966 / revised new edition, Rüdiger Bornhöft (Editor), Vienna, 1998
- Uwe Harten, Anton Bruckner. Ein Handbuch. Residenz Verlag, Salzburg, 1996. ISBN 3-7017-1030-9.
- Keith William Kinder, The Wind and Wind-Chorus Music of Anton Bruckner, Greenwood Press, Westport, Connecticut, 2000
- Cornelis van Zwol, Anton Bruckner – Leven en Werken, Thot, Bussum (Netherlands), 2012. ISBN 90-686-8590-2
