= Mass No. 2 (Bruckner) =

Piece of music by Anton Bruckner

- by Anton Bruckner
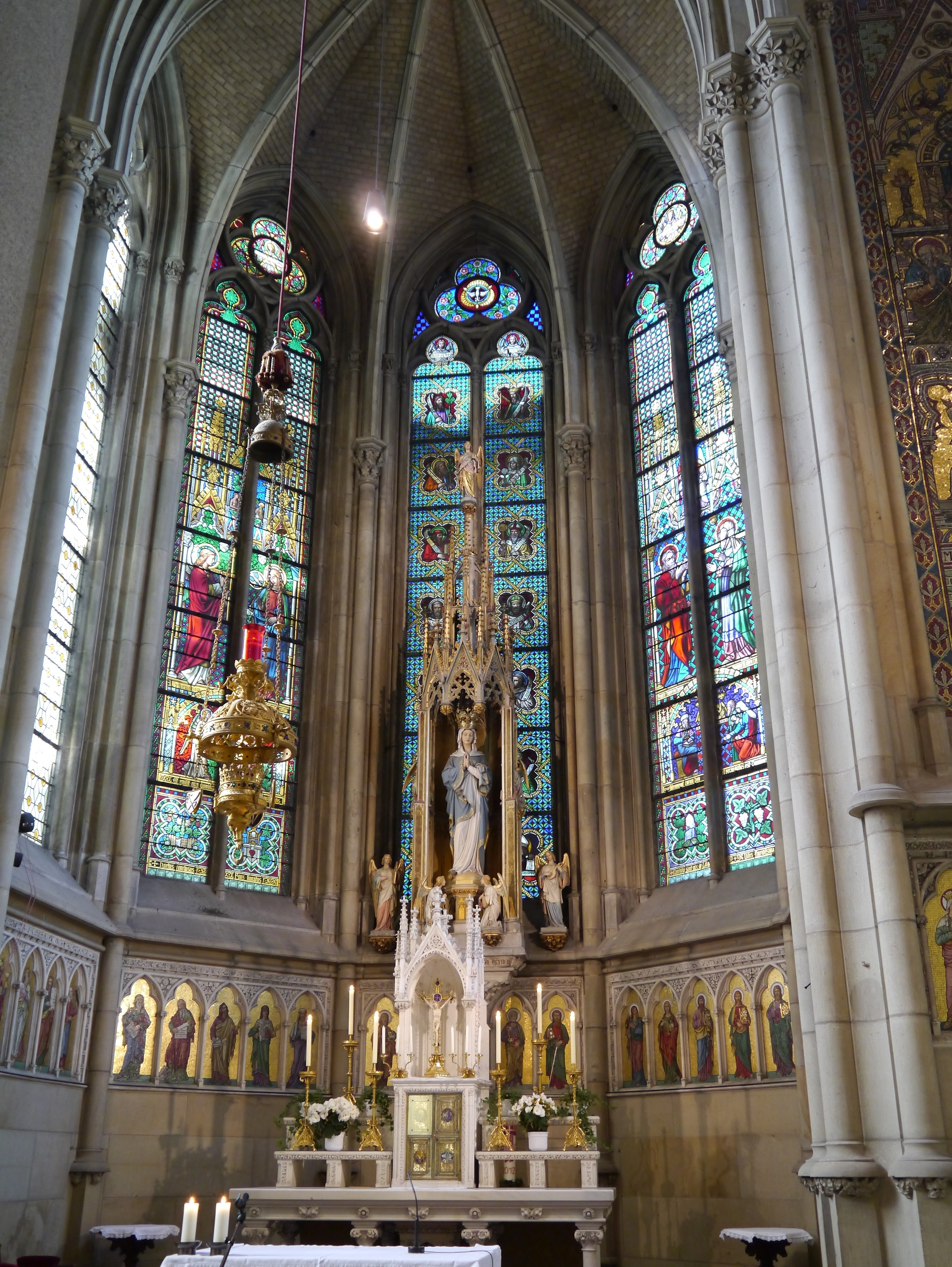
- The votive chapel in the Linz Cathedral (Mariä-Empfängnis- Dom), with a statue of Mary to whom the cathedral is dedicated
- Key: E minor
- Catalogue: WAB 27
- Form: Mass
- Composed: 1866: Linz (first version); 1882: Vienna (second version)
- Dedication: Dedication of the Votivkapelle of the new Linz Cathedral
- Performed: 29 September 1869: Linz (first version); 4 October 1885: Linz (second version)
- Published: 1896
- Movements: 6
- Vocal: SSAATTBB choir
- Instrumental: Wind band

The Mass No. 2 in E minor, WAB 27 is a setting of the mass ordinary for eight-part mixed choir and fifteen wind instruments, that Anton Bruckner composed in 1866.

== History ==
The bishop of Linz, Franz-Josef Rudigier, had already commissioned a Festive cantata from Bruckner in 1862 to celebrate the laying of the foundation stone of the new cathedral, the Maria-Empfängnis-Dom. In 1866, he asked Bruckner for a mass to celebrate the accomplishment of the construction of the Votive Chapel of the new cathedral. Because of a delay in completing the construction, the celebration of the dedication didn't take place until three years later, on 29 September 1869 on the Neuer Domplatz. The performers were the Liedertafel Frohsinn, the Sängerbund and Musikverein of Linz, and the wind band of the k.k. Infanterieregiment 'Ernst Ludwig, Großherzog von Hessen und bei Rhein Nr. 14'. The manuscript and the Widmungspartitur are archived in the episcopate of Linz.

Bruckner subjected the work to far-reaching revision in 1869, 1876, and 1882. The second version of 1882 was performed on 4 October 1885 in the Alter Dom, Linz by the Liedertafel Frohsinn, the Sängerbund and Musikverein of Linz under the baton of Adalbert Schreyer.

== Versions and editions ==
Bruckner left two versions of the mass. These are available in various editions:

- Version 1 of 1866, edited by Nowak in 1977
- Version 2 of 1882
  - First edition (Doblinger, 1896), revised by Franz Schalk
  - Haas editions (1940, 1949)
  - Nowak edition (1959)

The second version is slightly (26-bar) longer: 753 versus 727 bars. The differences among the two versions concern as well the phrasing as the accompaniment, mainly during the Credo and the Benedictus. As for the symphonies, the first version constitutes the raw material and sounds less polished, mainly during the orchestral transitions, than the later version. The about 150 differences among the two versions are described in detail at the end of the score of the 1882 version.

== Setting ==
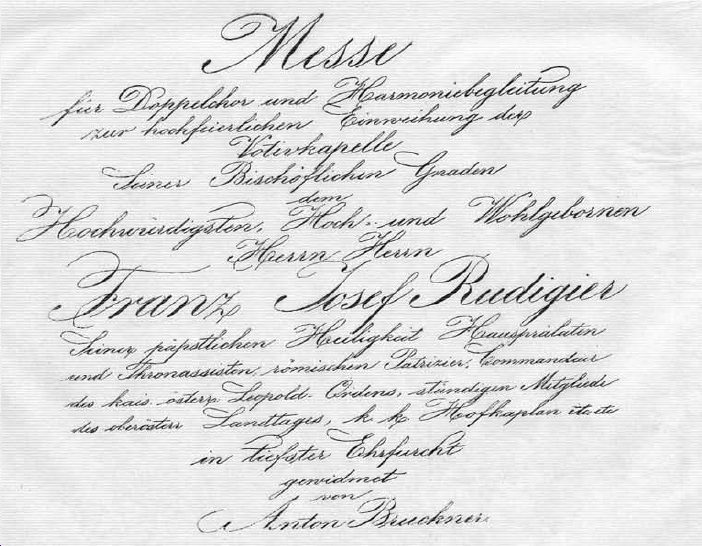
Front-page of Bruckner's manuscript

The piece is composed for eight-part mixed choir and wind instruments (2 oboes, 2 clarinets, 2 bassoons, 4 horns, 2 trumpets and 3 trombones).

It is based strongly on old-church music tradition, and particularly old Gregorian style singing. The Kyrie is almost entirely made up of a cappella singing for eight voices. The Gloria ends with a fugue, as in Bruckner's other masses. In the Sanctus, Bruckner uses a theme from Palestrina's Missa Brevis.

According to the Catholic practice – as also in Bruckner’s preceding Messe für den Gründonnerstag, Missa solemnis and Mass No. 1 – the first verse of the Gloria and the Credo is not composed and has to be intoned by the priest in Gregorian mode before the choir goes on.

The setting is divided into six parts:

1. Kyrie – Ruhig Sostenuto, E minor
2. Gloria – Allegro, C major
3. Credo – Allegro, C major
4. Sanctus – Andante, G major
5. Benedictus – Moderato, C major
6. Agnus Dei – Andante, E minor veering to E major

Total duration: about 40 minutes

Previously Bruckner had been criticized for "simply writing symphonies with liturgical text," and although the Cecilians were not entirely happy with the inclusion of wind instruments, "Franz Xaver Witt loved it, no doubt rationalizing the use of wind instruments as necessary under the circumstances of outdoor performance for which Bruckner wrote the piece."

The Mass in E minor ... is a work without parallel in either 19th- or 20th-century church music. … Even as Bishop Rudigier was laying the foundation stone for a new cathedral, Bruckner too was beginning to raise a cathedral in music.

Note

Bars 53–61 of the coda of the Christus factus est, WAB 10 are a clear quotation of the coda of the Kyrie of the Mass.

== Selected discography ==
=== Version 1 (1866) ===
There is only one recording of a music-school performance:

- Hans Hausreither, choir and instrumental ensemble of the BORG Wien 1 - CD: issue of the BORG, 1996. An out-of-print, according to Hans Roelofs unsatisfactory recording:

Hans-Christoph Rademann has performed the 1866 version of the Mass with the RIAS Kammerchor during a concert in the Lorenzkirche of Nürnberg on 23 June 2013. Rademann performed the 1866 version of the Mass again on 13 August 2014 in the Kloster Eberbach during the Chornacht „Das Licht gegeben„ at the Rheingau Musik Festival. Recordings of these live-performances are put in the Bruckner archive: CD - Charter Oak COR-1904 and COR-3437.

=== Version 2 (1882) ===
About 100 recordings of Bruckner's Mass No. 2 have been issued. The first recording of the mass was by Hermann Odermatt with the Gregorius-Chor and Orchester of Liebfrauenkirche, Zürich in 1930 (78 rpm Christschall 37-41).

Of the recordings from the LP era, Eugen Jochum's recording with the Bavarian Radio Symphony Orchestra and Chorus on Deutsche Grammophon has been remastered to CD. Matthew Best's more recent recording with the Corydon Singers has been critically acclaimed.

Other excellent recordings, according to Hans Roelofs, are i.a. those by Roger Norrington, Hellmut Wormsbächer, Philippe Herreweghe, Simon Halsey, Frieder Bernius, Ingemar Månsson, Helmuth Rilling, Marcus Creed, Winfried Toll and Otto Kargl.
Bernius particularly insists on the modernity of the score: the Mass is heard here in all its audacity. The highlight of the Mass is the poignant "Dona nobis pacem" in the Agnus Dei.
The music lover, who wants to experience the "environment" of a church interior, experiences with Kargl an atmospherically dense, dark, murmuring, sonorous recording with convincingly captured church acoustics – a recording that is able to captivate the listener.

- Eugen Jochum, choir and members of the Sinfonieorchester des Bayerischen Rundfunks, LP: DG 2530 139, 1971 – CD: DG 423 127-2 (Box set of 4 CD)
- Roger Norrington, Schütz Choir London, Philip Jones Wind Ensemble – CD: London/Decca 430365, 1973
- Hellmut Wormsbächer, Bergedorfer Kammerchor, members of the Philharmonischen Staatsorchester Hamburg, LP: Telefunken 6.41297, c. 1973 (with Schubert's Deutsche Messe); reissued on CD by the choir
- Matthew Best, Corydon Singers and English Chamber Orchestra Wind Ensemble, CD: Hyperion CDA 66177, 1985
- Simon Halsey, CBSO Wind Ensemble & Chorus, Mass in E minor (No. 2) / Motets – CD: Conifer CDCF 192, 1990
- Philippe Herreweghe, Collegium Vocale Gent & Chapelle Royale Paris, Ensemble Musique oblique, CD: Harmonia Mundi France HMC 901322, 1989
- Frieder Bernius, Kammerchor Stuttgart & Deutsche Bläserphilharmonie - CD: Sony Classical SK 48037, 1991
- Ingemar Månsson, Hägersten Motet Choir, ad hoc orchestra, Poulenc, Bruckner – CD: Caprice CAP 21420, 1991
- Helmuth Rilling, Gächinger Kantorei and Bach-Collegium Stuttgart, 1996 – CD: Hänssler 98.119 (with Te Deum and Psalm 150)
- Marcus Creed, SWR Vokalensemble Stuttgart, Mitglieder des Radio-Sinfonieorchesters Stuttgart des SWR, Anton Bruckner – Mass in E minor - Motets – CD: Hänssler Classic SACD 93.199, 2007
- Winfried Toll, Camerata Vocale Freiburg, Brass players of L'arpa festante, CD: Ars Musici 232828, 2008
- Otto Kargl, Domkantorei St. Pölten, Cappella Nova Graz and Blechbläserensemble – CD: ORF CD 3174, 2013
- Stephen Cleobury, King's College Choir and Academy of St Martin in the Fields – SACD: Kings College Cambridge KGS0035, 2020

== Sources ==
- Anton Bruckner, Sämtliche Werke, Kritische Gesamtausgabe – Band 13: Messe e-Moll (Fassung 1882), Musikwissenschaftlicher Verlag, Robert Haas (Editor), Leipzig, 1940
- Anton Bruckner: Sämtliche Werke: Band XVII: Messe e-Moll (1866-1882), Musikwissenschaftlicher Verlag der Internationalen Bruckner-Gesellschaft, Leopold Nowak (Editor), Vienna
  - XVII/1: 1. Fassung 1866, 1977
  - XVII/1: 2. Fassung 1882, 1959
- Max Auer, Anton Bruckner als Kirchenmusiker, Gustav Bosse Verlag, Regensburg, 1927, p. 111,136
- Uwe Harten, Anton Bruckner. Ein Handbuch. Residenz Verlag, Salzburg, 1996. ISBN 3-7017-1030-9.
- Paul Hawkshaw, "Bruckner's large sacred compositions" The Cambridge Companion to Bruckner edited by John Williamson, Cambridge University Press, Cambridge, 2004
- Stephen Johnson, "Anton Bruckner, Masses Nos. 1–3" 1001 Classical Recordings You Must Hear Before You Die, Rye Matthew (editor), Universe, New York, 2008
- Lee T Lovallo, "Mass no. 2 in e minor" - Anton Bruckner: a Discography, Rowman & Littlefield, New York, 1991
- Nick Strimple, Choral music in the nineteenth century, Hal Leonard, New York, 2008
- Cornelis van Zwol, Anton Bruckner - Leven en Werken, Thot, Bussum (Netherlands), 2012. ISBN 90-686-8590-2
