= Johann Ernst Altenburg =

German composer, organist and trumpeter (1734–1801)

Johann Ernst Altenburg (15 June 1734 – 14 May 1801) was a German composer, organist and trumpeter. He is not to be confused with a similarly named composer in the 1620s who contributed to the collection Angst der Hellen und Friede der Seelen.

== Life ==
Altenburg was born in Weißenfels. His father, Johann Kaspar Altenburg (1688–1761), worked from 1709 as a field trumpeter under Johann Adolf II, Duke of Saxe-Weissenfels, and from 1711 as head trumpeter for the duke's brother, Duke Christian von Sachsen-Weissenfels at his residence, Castle Neu-Augustusburg in Weissenfels. Here, Johann Ernst Altenburg was born on 15 June 1734. By age 18 the young Altenburg had received a formal acquittal as trumpeter. He studied organ for at most two years with Johann Theodor Roemhildt and Johann Christoph Altnikol.

From Merseburg and Landsberg near Halle, where he worked for a brief time as an organist, he went to Bitterfeld in 1767 and received his lifetime post as an organist. He stayed at this post until his death on 14 May 1801, although the post was hardly sufficient.

== Work ==
Altenburg as a composer is most known for his six harpsichord sonatas. He achieved musicological importance through his publication Versuch einer Anleitung zur heroisch-musikalischen Trompeter- und Paukerkunst (An Essay on the Introduction to Heroic and Musical Trumpeters' and Kettledrummers' Art) (Halle, 1795). These can be considered the oldest printed German trumpet studies and are thus the most meaningful resource of old trumpet technique. At the time of the printing, the greater part of the text had been in development for about 25 years. An advertisement for the publication appears in Johann Adam Hiller's Musikalischen Nachrichten in 1770. The earliest known reference to the manuscript is found in a letter of Altenburg's from February 1767.

Altenburg drew together the entire "knowledge" of the art of the trumpet of his time—certainly a concern considering his embossed, interpretive ways. He uses at least 108 works from at least 104 notably well-known authors, as well as new, further, anonymous authors. However, the literature he quotes mainly covers topics in general history, law, and religion. Altenburg's work is associated with contemporary instrumental technique. The examples cover a broad scope of trumpet history, which emerge with thorough analysis as back projection of Altenburg's ideal picture of trumpet practice in his society. Altenburg constructs an unbroken tradition of trumpet practice from Old Testament times (Aron's son) to his own time and lifts from that the claim of an even higher societal reputation for the trumpeter.

In this work some small compositions of mostly unclear authorship are offered. For example, there is a tiny duet for two clarion, a bourée for two clarion, a trio in the form of a polonaise, and a chorale for three clarion, principal trumpet, and drum, among others. Furthermore, he offers an addendum containing a concerto for seven clarion with drums. A small fugue for two clarion lifted from a work by Heinrich Ignaz Franz Biber nearly a century earlier also appears.

== See also ==
- Baroque trumpet

== Recordings ==
- Giuseppe Galante - Johann Ernst Altenburg: Concerto in D Major for 7 Trumpets and Timpani: I. Allegro
- Giuseppe Galante - Johann Ernst Altenburg: Concerto in D Major for 7 Trumpets and Timpani: II. Andante
- Giuseppe Galante - Johann Ernst Altenburg: Concerto in D Major for 7 Trumpets and Timpani: III. Vivace
