= List of psalm settings by Anton Bruckner =

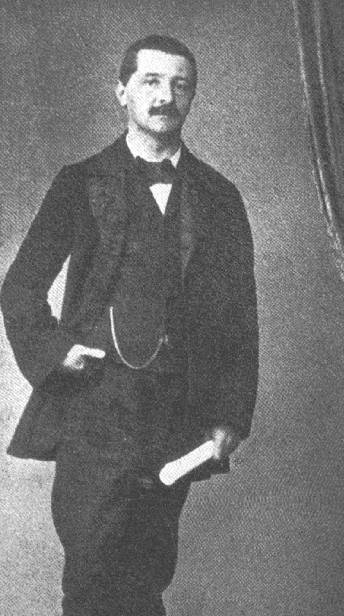
Anton Bruckner in 1854

Anton Bruckner composed five psalms settings during his life, the earliest Psalm 114 in 1852, the last, Psalm 150 in 1892.

== Sankt Florian ==
During his stay as organist in Sankt Florian, Bruckner composed the following two psalm settings:

- Psalm 114, WAB 36, is a setting in G major of verses 1 to 9 of a German version of Psalm 116 for five-part mixed choir and three trombones, composed in 1852 for the name day of Ignaz Assmayr.
- Psalm 22, WAB 34, is a setting in E♭ major of a German version of Psalm 23 for mixed choir, soloists and piano, composed in c. 1852.

== Linz ==
During his stay in Linz, Bruckner composed the following two psalm setting:

- Psalm 146, WAB 37, is a setting in A major of a German version of verses 1 to 11 of Psalm 147 for eight-part double mixed choir, four soloists and orchestra. The composition was presumably initiated during the Sankt Florian period (c. 1850) and completed during Sechter's tuition, in c. 1856.
- Psalm 112, WAB 35, is a setting in B♭ major of a German version of Psalm 113 for eight-part double mixed choir and full orchestra, composed in 1863 after the end of Kitzler's tuition.

== Vienna ==
About thirty years later, during his stay in Vienna, Bruckner composed a last psalm setting:

- Psalm 150, WAB 38, is a setting in C major of the German version of Psalm 150 for mixed chorus, soprano soloist and orchestra, composed in 1892 to celebrate the opening of the exposition Internationale Ausstellung für Musik und Theatherwesen in Vienna.

Bruckner's five psalm settings are put in Band XX of the Gesamtausgabe.

== Sources ==
- Anton Bruckner – Sämtliche Werke, Band XX: Psalmen und Magnificat (1852-1892), Musikwissenschaftlicher Verlag der Internationalen Bruckner-Gesellschaft, Paul Hawkshaw (Editor), Vienna, 1996
- Uwe Harten, Anton Bruckner. Ein Handbuch. Residenz Verlag, Salzburg, 1996. ISBN 3-7017-1030-9.
- Cornelis van Zwol, Anton Bruckner 1824-1896 - Leven en werken, uitg. Thoth, Bussum, Netherlands, 2012. ISBN 978-90-6868-590-9
