= Christus factus est, WAB 10 =

1873 motet composed by Anton Bruckner

Christus factus est
- Motet by Anton Bruckner
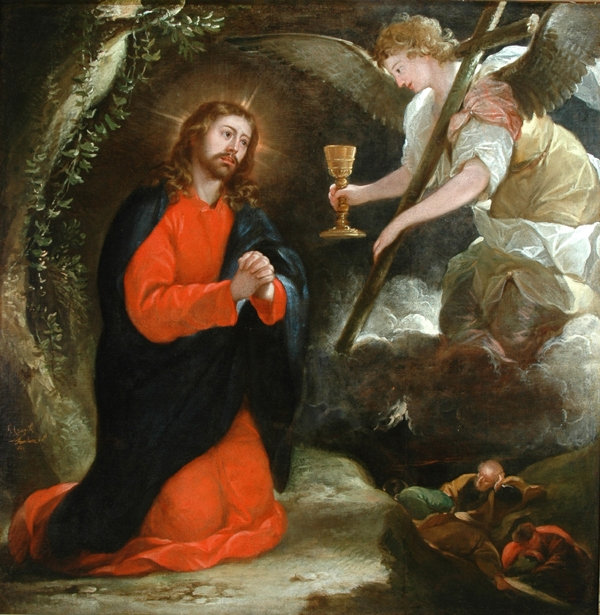
- Oración en el huerto de los Olivos, by José Antolínez
- Key: D minor
- Catalogue: WAB 10
- Form: Gradual
- Text: Christus factus est
- Language: Latin
- Performed: 8 December 1873: Vienna
- Published: 1934: Vienna
- Scoring: SSAATTBB choir
- Instrumental: 3 trombones; 2 violins; viola; cello; double bass

Christus factus est (Christ became obedient), WAB 10, is a sacred motet by Anton Bruckner, his second setting of the Latin gradual Christus factus est, written in 1873. Several decades earlier, in 1844, he had composed another piece on the same text as gradual for the Messe für den Gründonnerstag (WAB 9). In 1884, Bruckner composed a third, better known setting (WAB 11) for choir a cappella.

== History ==
Bruckner composed the motet in 1873, and it was first performed on 8 December 1873 in the Wiener Hofmusikkapelle for the celebration of Mariä Empfängnis (feast of the Immaculate Conception).

The manuscript, a copy of which is archived at the Austrian National Library, was destroyed in 1945. On his manuscript Bruckner wrote Besser ohne Violinen (better without violins). According to R. Luna, this "would mean that he conceived the work ideally for eight-part choir with brief interventions of the trombones and that he had written the strings colla parte to prevent any intonation problems.

The work was published first by Ludwig Berberich in Vienna in 1934 without string instruments (the violins being replaced by the alto voice during bars 1-14). The new edition (Nowak-Bauernfeind) is in accordance with the original manuscript.

== Music ==
The 61-bar work in D minor is scored for eight-part mixed choir, three trombones, two violins, and viola, cello and double bass.

The first section (bars 1–12), a Dorian mode melody sung by the soprano and alto voices in unison, which is accompanied by a counterpoint of the first and second violins, ends on "autem crucis".
The second section (bars 13–21), a fugato, modulates to B-flat major and ends on bars 20–21 in forte on "exaltavit illum".
The third section (bars 22–31), sustained by the strings and the trombones, ends in a climax in A♭ major on "dedit illi nomen".
The fourth section (bars 31 61) begins in pianissimo and in successive entries of the eight voices – from the lowest till the highest vocal parts – establishing a "pyramid" of sound based on an A♭ pedal tone, which leads the a further climax in C major. It is followed on bar 38 by a second "pyramid", which follows the same procedure and ends in D major.
The coda on "quod est super" begins on bar 45 with a third "pyramid", which is charged with a greater dramatic effect, and ends on bars 51-53 with an a cappella climax in D minor. The second part of the coda (bars 53–61), sung a cappella, which is a clear quotation of the coda of the Kyrie of the Mass in E minor, ends in pianissimo in D major.

"One has to value this composition as one of the most expressive and monumental works of Bruckner's sacred music…", was a comment by the musicologist Leopold Nowak on his impression of the work.

== Discography ==
There are only two recordings of this setting of Christus factus est:

- Jonathan Brown, Ealing Abbey Choir, Anton Bruckner: Sacred Motets – CD: Herald HAVPCD 213, 1997 (fully a cappella)
- Ricardo Luna, Hard-Chor Linz, Ensemble Wien-Linz, Bruckner unknown – CD: Preiser Records PR 91250, 2013 (following the original score) – can also be heard on YouTube: Christus factus est, Original Version, WAB10

== Sources ==
- Anton Bruckner – Sämtliche Werke, Band XXI: Kleine Kirchenmusikwerke, Musikwissenschaftlicher Verlag der Internationalen Bruckner-Gesellschaft, Hans Bauernfeind and Leopold Nowak (Editor), Vienna, 1984/2001
- Cornelis van Zwol, Anton Bruckner 1824–1896 – Leven en werken, uitg. Thoth, Bussum, Netherlands, 2012. ISBN 978-90-6868-590-9
- Uwe Harten, Anton Bruckner. Ein Handbuch. Residenz Verlag, Salzburg, 1996. ISBN 3-7017-1030-9.
