= Psalm 114 (Bruckner) =

- by Anton Bruckner
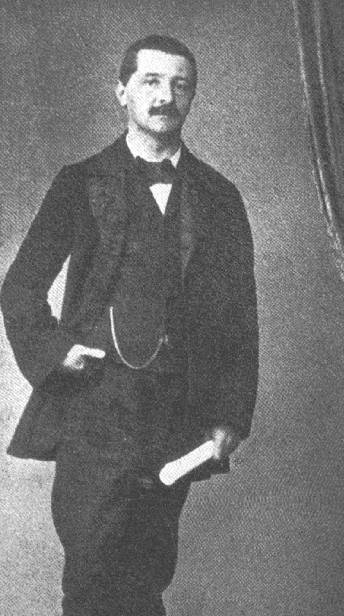
- The young Bruckner
- Key: G major
- Catalogue: WAB 36
- Form: Psalm setting
- Composed: 1852: St. Florian
- Dedication: Hofkapelmeister Ignaz Assmayr
- Performed: 1 April 1906 by August Göllerich
- Published: 1997
- Recorded: 1987 by Matthew Best
- Vocal: SAATB choir
- Instrumental: 3 trombones

Bruckner's Psalm 114, WAB 36, is a psalm setting of verses 1 to 9 of a German version of Psalm 116, which is Psalm 114 in the Vulgata.

== History ==
The work was composed in 1852 in St. Florian. Bruckner dedicated it to Hofkapelmeister Ignaz Assmayr for the celebration of his name-day. The work was rehearsed at that time, but it was not followed by a public performance. The original manuscript, which is somewhat incomplete in detail, is stored in the archive of the St. Florian Abbey.

The work was premiered by August Göllerich on 1 April 1906, using a copy of the manuscript. The work was first recorded by Matthew Best in 1987 and edited by Paul Hawkshaw in 1997 in Band XX/1 of the Gesamtausgabe, based on the dedicated Reinschrift, which had been retrieved in 1957 in a private collection in Vienna.

During a concert on 25 June 2017 with the Missa solemnis, Łukasz Borowicz with the RIAS Kammerchor and the Akademie für Alte Musik Berlin performed also Bruckner's Psalm 114. The later issued Accentus CD ACC 30429 of this concert did however not include this performance of Psalm 114. A recording of this performance of Psalm 114 is available in the Bruckner Archive.

== Text ==
Dank für Rettung aus großen Gefahren (Thanks for salvation from great perils)

1. Alleluja! Liebe erfüllt mich, weil der Herr die Stimme meines Flehens erhört hat,
2. Weil er sein Ohr zu mir neigte: mein Leben lang werd' ich ihn anrufen.
3. Es umgaben mich die Schmerzen des Todes, es trafen mich die Gefahren der Hölle, Trübsal und Schmerz fand ich:
4. Da rief ich den Namen des Herrn an: O Herr, erlöse meine Seele!
5. Barmherzig ist der Herr und gerecht: unser Gott ist barmherzig.
6. Der Herr bewahret die Kleinen: ich war gedemüthigt, und er half mir.
7. Kehre zurück, meine Seele, in deine Ruh: denn der Herr hat dir wohlgethan;
8. Denn er errettete meine Seele vom Tode, meine Augen von den Thränen, meine Füße vom Falle.
9. Ich will gefallen dem Herrn im Lande der Lebendigen.

== Setting ==
The 209-bar long work in G major is written for five-part mixed choir (SAATB) and three trombones.

"The music is at first of an impressive archaic austerity, bare in harmony, and strikingly simple in texture. E minor is the opening key, but G major ultimately dominates." The structure of the psalm, which is quite simple in concept, is grounded on liturgical practice. The composition begins with a four-phrase, homophonically constructed Alleluja, which serves as an antiphon to the psalm setting. The individual verses, with the exception of verses seven and eight, are clearly separated by strong cadences or a few beats of silence. "[Bruckner] relied to the trombones to reinforce contrasts delineated by the silences that would become so poignant in his later music." The trombones are so reinforcing the contrasts between "Es umgaben mich die Schmerzen des Todes" (shift to minor) and "Kehre zurück meine Seele" (return to major). The truly inspired work, which projects a profound understanding of the text, captivates the ear with interesting harmonies and varied timbres and textures. The final words of verse eight ("meine Füße vom Falle."), which are set in a two-voice canon over a dominant pedal, provide an effective bridge to the large-scale, five-voice double fugue, which ends with a powerful unison on "im Lande der Lebendigen."

Bruckner's Psalm 114 is an aurally pleasing and expressive composition that does not deserve the near oblivion to which it has been relegated. It represents another important step in his slow process toward a purely musical career.

== Discography ==
There are three recordings of Bruckner's Psalm 114:

- Matthew Best, Bruckner - Requiem, Psalms 112 & 114, Corydon Singers, English Chamber Orchestra, 1987 - CD Hyperion CDA66245
  This recording of Psalm 114 used a score made by Best-self, based on the Reinschrift-Partitur.
- Johannes Rühl, Anton Bruckner zum 175. Geburtstag, Capella Kreuzberg, members of the Berlin State Opera, 1999 - CD issued by the choir
- Mark Forkgen, Sing Praises, London Concert Choir, Alexander Mason (organ), 2002 - CD issued by the choir (with organ instead of trombones)

== Sources ==
- Cornelis van Zwol, Anton Bruckner – Leven en Werken, Thot, Bussum (Netherlands), 2012. ISBN 90-686-8590-2
- John Williamson, The Cambridge Companion to Bruckner, Cambridge University Press, 2004. ISBN 0-521-80404-3
- Keith William Kinder, The Wind and Wind-Chorus Music of Anton Bruckner, Greenwood Press, Westport CT, 2000. ISBN 0-313-30834-9.
- Uwe Harten, Anton Bruckner. Ein Handbuch. Residenz Verlag, Salzburg, 1996. ISBN 3-7017-1030-9.
- Anton Bruckner – Sämtliche Werke, Band XX/1: Psalm 114 (1852), Musikwissenschaftlicher Verlag der Internationalen Bruckner-Gesellschaft, Paul Hawkshaw (Editor), Vienna, 1997
