= Psalm 116 =

116th psalm of the book of psalms

- "I love the LORD, because he hath heard my voice"
- Egyptian Hallel psalm
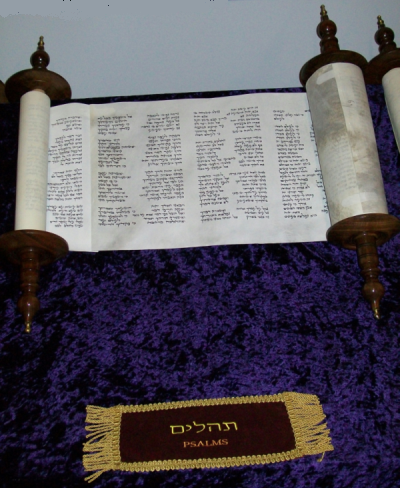
- Scroll of the Psalms
- Other name: Psalm 114; "Dilexi quoniam exaudiet Dominus"; Psalm 115; "Credidi propter quod locutus sum"
- Language: Hebrew (original)

Psalm 116
- ← Psalm 115 Psalm 117 →
- Book: Book of Psalms
- Hebrew Bible part: Ketuvim
- Order in the Hebrew part: 1
- Category: Sifrei Emet
- Christian Bible part: Old Testament
- Order in the Christian part: 19

Psalm 116 is the 116th psalm of the Book of Psalms, beginning in English in the King James Version: "I love the LORD, because he hath heard my voice and my supplications". It is part of the Egyptian Hallel sequence in the Book of Psalms.

In the slightly different numbering system in the Greek Septuagint and the Latin Vulgate version of the Bible, this psalm begins with Psalm 114, counted as verses 1–9 of Psalm 116, combined with Psalm 115 for the remaining verses. In Latin, Psalm 114 is known as "Dilexi quoniam exaudiet Dominus", and Psalm 115 is known as "Credidi propter quod locutus sum". Psalm 116 in Hebrew is the fourth psalm in the “Egyptian Hallel”. The Septuagint and Vulgate open with the word "Alleluia", whereas the Hebrew version has this word at the end of the preceding psalm.

Psalm 116 is used as a regular part of Jewish, Catholic, Lutheran, Anglican and other Protestant liturgies. It has often been set to music, including settings by Marc-Antoine Charpentier, Anton Bruckner and Franz Schreker.

== Language ==
Psalm 116 is without a title in the Hebrew. The psalm was translated into the Greek Septuagint (about 250BC) in Hellenistic Egypt. There is a presence of Aramaisms in the psalm which has been interpreted by some biblical commentators as evidence of a late date, although this is not definitive. The psalm draws heavily from other psalms, so much so that the German commentator Hermann Hupfeld called it a "patched-up psalm".

== Theme ==
It is a question of the praise of the Lord by all peoples. The second verse expresses the reason for the first verse: the goodness of the Lord has been experienced in the past, and his faithfulness will last forever. If we take into consideration the whole book of psalms, we see that this psalm seems to sum up and conclude all the psalms of the hallel, and even all the preceding psalms from Psalm 107 onwards, for they invite Israel and all nations to praise "Eternal".

== Authorship ==
Theodoret in the fifth century applied this psalm to the distresses of the Jews in the times of the Maccabees under Antiochus Epiphanes, while a small minority ascribe it to Hezekiah's sickness, recorded in Isaiah 38; Alexander Kirkpatrick notes a similarity in the wording. However, most commentators today ascribe it to King David. If David were the author, it is not certain whether it was composed upon any particular occasion, or "upon a general review of the many gracious deliverances God had wrought for him". The Syriac Church holds it was written on the occasion of Saul coming to the cave where David was hiding.

== Uses ==
=== New Testament ===
Verse 10 of the Psalm was quoted by Paul the Apostle in 2 Corinthians 4:13.

=== Judaism ===
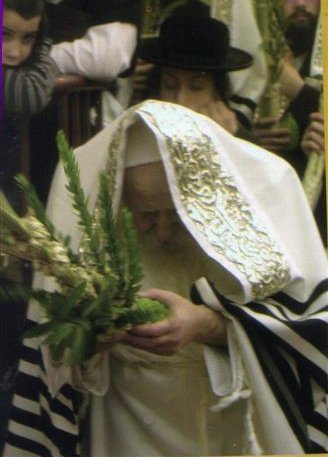
The Tosher Rebbe of Montreal, Quebec, Canada shaking the four species during Sukkot while praying Hallel.

- This psalm is one of six psalms (113-118) of which Hallel is composed. On all days when Hallel is recited, this psalm is recited in its entirety, except on Rosh Chodesh and the last six days of Passover, when only verses 1-11 are recited. The word hallel means "praise". Since ancient times, the Egyptian Hallel has been used in the celebration of Passover.
- Verse 13 is part of Havdalah.

=== Syriac Christianity ===
The Syriac Church applies it to converts coming into the church.

=== Coptic Orthodox Church ===
In the Agpeya, the Coptic Church's book of hours, this psalm is prayed (as two consecutive psalms) in the office of None. It is also in the prayer of the Veil, which is generally prayed only by monks.

=== Catholicism ===
The Psalm has been used as public prayer by Pope John Paul II, who called it a "Prayer of thanksgiving to the Lord". The Psalm is used in the Rule of St. Benedict. However, Psalm 117 is now read in the Liturgy of the Hours.

=== Protestant Christianity ===
Matthew Henry calls it a thanksgiving psalm, while Charles Spurgeon saw it as "A Psalm of Thanksgiving in the Person of Christ". David Dickson wrote, "This Psalm is a threefold engagement of the Psalmist unto thanksgiving unto God, for his mercy unto him, and in particular for some notable delivery of him from death, both bodily and spiritual."

On February 3, 1788 Anglican Minister, Reverend Richard Johnson delivered the first Christian church service ever on Australian soil to convicts of the First Fleet. The text of his sermon was Psalm 116:12-14.

=== City motto ===
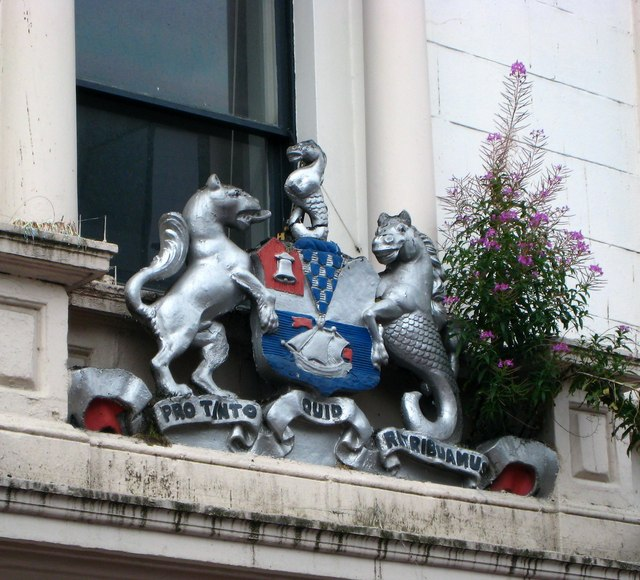
Pro Tanto Quid Retribuamus, Belfast city motto

The city of Belfast, Northern Ireland has as its motto Pro Tanto Quid Retribuamus, the Vulgate translation of Ps 116:12 ("what shall we give in return for so much?" or "What shall I return to the Lord for all his bounty to me?")

== Musical settings ==
Heinrich Schütz composed a metred paraphrase of Psalm 116 in German, "Meim Herzen ist's ein große Freud", SWV 214, for the Becker Psalter, published first in 1628.

A collection Angst der Hellen und Friede der Seelen ("Fear of Hell and Peace of the Soul") combines sixteen motet settings of Psalm 116 in German, "Das ist mir lieb" (That is dear to me). It was commissioned by the Jena merchant Burckhard Grossmann in 1616, and published in 1623. The composers are Heinrich Schütz, Michael Altenburg, Christoph Demantius, Nicolaus Erich, Andreas Finold, Melchior Franck, Abraham Gensreff, Johannes Groh, Johann Krause, Christian Michael, Daniel Michael, Rogier Michael, Tobias Michael, Michael Praetorius, Johann Hermann Schein and Caspar Trost.

Marc-Antoine Charpentier set Psalmus David 115 (in Vulgate numbering), Credidi propter quod locutus sum, H. 209 - H. 209a, for soloists, chorus and continuo in 1690. Anton Bruckner composed a setting of the first nine verses as Psalm 114 "Alleluja! Liebe erfüllt mich", WAB 36, in 1852. Franz Schreker composed a setting of Psalm 116 for three-part women's choir and orchestra as his Op. 6 in 1900.

== Text ==
The following table shows the Hebrew text of the Psalm with vowels, alongside the Koine Greek text in the Septuagint and the English translation from the King James Version. Note that the meaning can slightly differ between these versions, as the Septuagint and the Masoretic Text come from different textual traditions. (Note: A 1917 translation directly from Hebrew to English by the Jewish Publication Society can be found here or here, and an 1844 translation directly from the Septuagint by L. C. L. Brenton can be found here and here. Both translations are in the public domain.) In the Septuagint, verses 1–9 are counted as Psalm 114, and verses 10–19 are counted as Psalm 115.

#	Hebrew	English	Greek
1	אָ֭הַבְתִּי כִּי־יִשְׁמַ֥ע ׀ יְהֹוָ֑ה אֶת־ק֝וֹלִ֗י תַּחֲנוּנָֽי׃	I love the LORD, because he hath heard my voice and my supplications.	᾿Αλληλούϊα. - ΗΓΑΠΗΣΑ, ὅτι εἰσακούσεται Κύριος τῆς φωνῆς τῆς δεήσεώς μου,
2	כִּי־הִטָּ֣ה אׇזְנ֣וֹ לִ֑י וּבְיָמַ֥י אֶקְרָֽא׃	Because he hath inclined his ear unto me, therefore will I call upon him as long as I live.	ὅτι ἔκλινε τὸ οὖς αὐτοῦ ἐμοί, καὶ ἐν ταῖς ἡμέραις μου ἐπικαλέσομαι.
3	אֲפָפ֤וּנִי ׀ חֶבְלֵי־מָ֗וֶת וּמְצָרֵ֣י שְׁא֣וֹל מְצָא֑וּנִי צָרָ֖ה וְיָג֣וֹן אֶמְצָֽא׃	The sorrows of death compassed me, and the pains of hell gat hold upon me: I found trouble and sorrow.	περιέσχον με ὠδῖνες θανάτου, κίνδυνοι ᾅδου εὕροσάν με· θλῖψιν καὶ ὀδύνην εὗρον,
4	וּבְשֵֽׁם־יְהֹוָ֥ה אֶקְרָ֑א אָנָּ֥ה יְ֝הֹוָ֗ה מַלְּטָ֥ה נַפְשִֽׁי׃	Then called I upon the name of the LORD; O LORD, I beseech thee, deliver my soul.	καὶ τὸ ὄνομα Κυρίου ἐπεκαλεσάμην· ὦ Κύριε, ῥῦσαι τὴν ψυχήν μου.
5	חַנּ֣וּן יְהֹוָ֣ה וְצַדִּ֑יק וֵ֖אלֹהֵ֣ינוּ מְרַחֵֽם׃	Gracious is the LORD, and righteous; yea, our God is merciful.	ἐλεήμων ὁ Κύριος καὶ δίκαιος, καὶ ὁ Θεὸς ἡμῶν ἐλεεῖ.
6	שֹׁמֵ֣ר פְּתָאיִ֣ם יְהֹוָ֑ה דַּ֝לֹּתִ֗י וְלִ֣י יְהוֹשִֽׁיעַ׃	The LORD preserveth the simple: I was brought low, and he helped me.	φυλάσσων τὰ νήπια ὁ Κύριος· ἐταπεινώθην, καὶ ἔσωσέ με.
7	שׁוּבִ֣י נַ֭פְשִׁי לִמְנוּחָ֑יְכִי כִּֽי־יְ֝הֹוָ֗ה גָּמַ֥ל עָלָֽיְכִי׃	Return unto thy rest, O my soul; for the LORD hath dealt bountifully with thee.	ἐπίστρεψον, ψυχή μου, εἰς τὴν ἀνάπαυσίν σου, ὅτι Κύριος εὐηργέτησέ σε,
8	כִּ֤י חִלַּ֥צְתָּ נַפְשִׁ֗י מִ֫מָּ֥וֶת אֶת־עֵינִ֥י מִן־דִּמְעָ֑ה אֶת־רַגְלִ֥י מִדֶּֽחִי׃	For thou hast delivered my soul from death, mine eyes from tears, and my feet from falling.	ὅτι ἐξείλετο τὴν ψυχήν μου ἐκ θανάτου, τοὺς ὀφθαλμούς μου ἀπὸ δακρύων καὶ τοὺς πόδας μου ἀπὸ ὀλισθήματος.
9	אֶ֭תְהַלֵּךְ לִפְנֵ֣י יְהֹוָ֑ה בְּ֝אַרְצ֗וֹת הַחַיִּֽים׃	I will walk before the LORD in the land of the living.	εὐαρεστήσω ἐνώπιον Κυρίου, ἐν χώρᾳ ζώντων.
10	הֶ֭אֱמַנְתִּי כִּ֣י אֲדַבֵּ֑ר אֲ֝נִ֗י עָנִ֥יתִי מְאֹֽד׃	I believed, therefore have I spoken: I was greatly afflicted:	᾿Αλληλούϊα. - ΕΠΙΣΤΕΥΣΑ, διὸ ἐλάλησα· ἐγὼ δὲ ἐταπεινώθην σφόδρα.
11	אֲ֭נִי אָמַ֣רְתִּי בְחׇפְזִ֑י כׇּֽל־הָאָדָ֥ם כֹּזֵֽב׃	I said in my haste, All men are liars.	ἐγὼ δὲ εἶπα ἐν τῇ ἐκστάσει μου· πᾶς ἄνθρωπος ψεύστης.
12	מָה־אָשִׁ֥יב לַיהֹוָ֑ה כׇּֽל־תַּגְמוּל֥וֹהִי עָלָֽי׃	What shall I render unto the LORD for all his benefits toward me?	τί ἀνταποδώσω τῷ Κυρίῳ περὶ πάντων, ὧν ἀνταπέδωκέ μοι;
13	כּוֹס־יְשׁוּע֥וֹת אֶשָּׂ֑א וּבְשֵׁ֖ם יְהֹוָ֣ה אֶקְרָֽא׃	I will take the cup of salvation, and call upon the name of the LORD.	ποτήριον σωτηρίου λήψομαι καὶ τὸ ὄνομα Κυρίου ἐπικαλέσομαι.
14	נְ֭דָרַי לַיהֹוָ֣ה אֲשַׁלֵּ֑ם נֶגְדָה־נָּ֝֗א לְכׇל־עַמּֽוֹ׃	I will pay my vows unto the LORD now in the presence of all his people.	τὰς εὐχάς μου τῷ Κυρίῳ ἀποδώσω ἐναντίον παντὸς τοῦ λαοῦ αὐτοῦ.
15	יָ֭קָר בְּעֵינֵ֣י יְהֹוָ֑ה הַ֝מָּ֗וְתָה לַחֲסִידָֽיו׃	Precious in the sight of the LORD is the death of his saints.	τίμιος ἐναντίον Κυρίου ὁ θάνατος τῶν ὁσίων αὐτοῦ.
16	אָנָּ֣ה יְהֹוָה֮ כִּֽי־אֲנִ֢י עַ֫בְדֶּ֥ךָ אֲנִי־עַ֭בְדְּךָ בֶּן־אֲמָתֶ֑ךָ פִּ֝תַּ֗חְתָּ לְמֽוֹסֵרָֽי׃	O LORD, truly I am thy servant; I am thy servant, and the son of thine handmaid: thou hast loosed my bonds.	ὦ Κύριε, ἐγὼ δοῦλος σός, ἐγὼ δοῦλος σὸς καὶ υἱὸς τῆς παιδίσκης σου. διέρρηξας τοὺς δεσμούς μου,
17	לְֽךָ־אֶ֭זְבַּח זֶ֣בַח תּוֹדָ֑ה וּבְשֵׁ֖ם יְהֹוָ֣ה אֶקְרָֽא׃	I will offer to thee the sacrifice of thanksgiving, and will call upon the name of the LORD.	σοὶ θύσω θυσίαν αἰνέσεως καὶ ἐν ὀνόματι Κυρίου ἐπικαλέσομαι.
18	נְ֭דָרַי לַיהֹוָ֣ה אֲשַׁלֵּ֑ם נֶגְדָה־נָּ֝֗א לְכׇל־עַמּֽוֹ׃	I will pay my vows unto the LORD now in the presence of all his people.	τὰς εὐχάς μου τῷ Κυρίῳ ἀποδώσω ἐναντίον παντὸς τοῦ λαοῦ αὐτοῦ,
19	בְּחַצְר֤וֹת ׀ בֵּ֤ית יְהֹוָ֗ה בְּֽת֘וֹכֵ֤כִי יְֽרוּשָׁלָ֗͏ִם הַֽלְלוּ־יָֽהּ׃	In the courts of the LORD's house, in the midst of thee, O Jerusalem. Praise ye the LORD.	ἐν αὐλαῖς οἴκου Κυρίου ἐν μέσῳ σου, ῾Ιερουσαλήμ.

=== Notable verses ===
- Verse 11, In my haste I said all men are liars

This can be read as an early statement of the liar paradox. It has also been translated "I said in my fear, Every man is a liar." and "In an ecstasy of despair, I said, the whole race of man is a delusion." Some take the word חפז, (chaphaz) to denote haste or flight rather than fear. Samuel Horsley translates the verse as "an ecstasy of despair".

- Verse 17, I will sacrifice the sacrifices of praise
- Verse 13, The cup of salvation

This phrase has been used by Catholics as prophetic of the eucharist. While some see this as similar to the modern Jewish ceremony held every year in commemoration of the deliverance of their ancestors from the bondage of Egypt. Others see this portion as reference to morning drink offering in Solomon's Temple under Mosaic law (Numbers 28:7), inferring the writer is now making an offering of thanks for being delivered. Others think the verse may have inspired Jesus at the Last Supper, or Paul's "cup of blessing".
