= Mass No. 1 (Bruckner) =

Piece of music by Anton Bruckner

- by Anton Bruckner
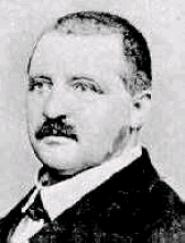
- The composer, c. 1860
- Key: D minor
- Catalogue: WAB 26
- Form: Mass
- Performed: 20 November 1864: old Linz Cathedral
- Published: 1892: Innsbruck
- Movements: 6
- Vocal: SATB choir and soloists
- Instrumental: orchestra and organ

The Mass No. 1 in D minor, WAB 26 by Anton Bruckner, is a setting of the Mass ordinary for soloists, mixed choir and orchestra, and organ.

== History ==
After he had ended his eight-year study period with Sechter and Kitzler and he had composed a few smaller works, such as the Festive Cantata (1862) and Psalm 112 (1863), Bruckner composed his first grand Mass, the Mass in D minor. He completed the work on 29 September 1864.

The premiere of the Mass in the old Linz Cathedral on 20 November 1864 was successful. A laudatory review in the Linzer Zeitung described Bruckner's potential as a symphonic composer and ranked the D minor Mass in the highest echelon of church music.
Four weeks later, the Mass was performed again during a "Concert spirituel" in the Linzer Redoutensaal. Because there was no organ available in the Redoutensaal, Bruckner composed an alternative with woodwinds (clarinets and bassoons) for the short organ intermezzo in the mid-section of the Credo (manuscript Mus.Hs. 3170). Bruckner's manuscript (Mus.Hs. 19423) and the organ score are archived in the Österreichische Nationalbibliothek.

Bruckner revised the work in 1876 and again in 1881–1882. The (small) differences between the versions concern mainly annotations about articulation and dynamics.

== Versions and editions ==
First version 1864, slightly revised in 1876 and 1881–82.

- First edition: Johann Groß, Innsbruck (1892)
- Nowak edition (1957, 1996)

== Setting ==
The work is set for SATB choir and soloists, and orchestra (2 flutes, 2 oboes, 2 clarinets in B♭, 2 bassoons, 2 horns in F, 2 trumpets in F, alto, tenor and bass trombones, timpani, and strings), and organ.

According to the Catholic practice – as also in Bruckner's previous Messe für den Gründonnerstag and Missa solemnis, and the following Mass No. 2 – the first verse of the Gloria and the Credo is not composed and has to be intoned by the priest in Gregorian mode before the choir goes on.

The work is divided into six parts:

1. Kyrie – Alla breve (mehr langsam), D minor
2. Gloria – Allegro, D major
3. Credo – Moderato, D major
4. Sanctus – Maestoso, D major
5. Benedictus – Moderato, G major
6. Agnus Dei- Andante quasi Allegretto, G minor veering to D major

Total duration: about 50 minutes

When compared to the previous Missa solemnis the work is more mature in conception with crescendos, which are so characteristic of Bruckner's later symphonies.

Wagner's influence is evident as the orchestra plays a major role setting the stage, developing material and intensifying the drama. ... [A] passage by way of illustrating [it] ... might be the death and resurrection section of the Credo ... The plaintive a cappella setting of 'passus et sepultus est' ... is reflected in pianissimo woodwind (or organ) and brass chorales before the strings propel a tremendous crescendo to a triumphant re-entry of the chorus at 'Et resurrexit'.

However, there is a continuity with previous works. Several passages, such as the Qui tollis of the Gloria, the central part of the Credo, and the devoutness of the word "Jesu Christe", the solemness of "cum gloria" and the dread of the word mortuorum, were already prefigured in the Missa solemnis. Moreover, the string pianissimo in the opening bars of the Kyrie was also foreshadowed in the opening bars of Psalm 146. The Qui cum Patre et Filio in the Credo is quoting the foregoing Afferentur regi.

The repeat structure already stubbed in Psalm 112 – a product of Kitzler's tutelage – is clearly present in the work: repeat of the starting theme of the Credo in "Et in spiritum", and that of "Et resurrexit" in "Et expecto"; repeat of the "Osanna" of the Sanctus at the end of the Benedictus; and that of the ascending scale of the Kyrie, of "Et vitam venturi" and of the fugue subject of the Gloria in the Dona nobis.

Bruckner used also this ascending scale (a reminiscence of the "Qua resurget ex favilla homo reus" from Mozart's Requiem), as a stairway to heaven in i.a. the Adagio of several symphonies and his Te Deum. Its inversion, which Bruckner had used already in the first part of his Psalm 146, will be later used in the Andante of the Fourth Symphony and is also prefiguring the "Farewell to Life" of the Adagio of the Ninth Symphony.

Bruckner used a citation of the "Miserere nobis" from the Gloria in the transition to the development of the first movement of his Third Symphony. At the end of his life he made again a citation of it, as a kind of supplication, before the climax of the Adagio of his Ninth Symphony. As Nowak wrote

Perhaps the best indication of the high regard in which Bruckner held this mass is his use of the miserere-motif from the Gloria in the Adagio of the Ninth Symphony. He could think of no more fitting music for his farewell to life itself than the humbly pleading six-four chord sequences of his days in Linz.

== Selected discography ==
The discography of Mass No. 1 is less abundant than that of the following Masses No. 2 and No. 3. Except for a partial recording (Gloria only) performed by Pius Kalt in around 1925, the first recording was taped by F. Charles Adler for his SPA label in 1954 and issued the following year. In this recording, which used Gross first edition, the "Miserere nobis" from the Gloria is sung by the bass soloist instead of by the choir. The intermezzo of the Credo is performed by the woodwind instruments.

About twenty years later, in 1972, Eugen Jochum recorded the Mass on LP (DG 2530 314). It was reissued in an LP-box together the two other Masses, Psalm 150 and several motets. The box has been later transferred to CD. According to Hans Roelofs this recording with organ intermezzo in the Credo remains the reference.

Among the about fifteen other recordings, of which one third was not brought to the commercial market, Matthew Best's and Froschauer's recordings with organ intermezzo, and Gardiner's, Matt's and Ortner's recordings with woodwind intermezzo are, according to Roelofs, also good performances.
Frieberger's live performance, recorded in the rood-screen of the Alter Dom of Linz during the Brucknerfest 2008, provides the listener with a whiff of authenticity. As Roelofs writes "(translated) The ambience of the premiere is offered here. ... a lively and transparent interpretation. The music gets here a huge shattering power due to the historical playing style, and the difference to recordings with the 'smoothly polished' modern instruments is striking."

In the recent years, there are more performances of the Mass in D minor by, e.g., Mattias Giesen in the Basilika St. Florian (13 August 2018), Gerd Schaller at the Ebrach Summer Music Festival (1 September 2019), Franz Welser-Möst at the anniversary concert of 950 years of the St. Florian Boys' Choir (11 June 2021), and Markus Landerer on Pentecost Sunday in the Stephansdom of Vienna (28 May 2023). In Gerd Schaller’s performance, the "Miserere nobis" from the Gloria is, as by Adler, sung the bass soloist. Only Giesen's performance has been commercially issued as yet.

Since then, the Mass has had a renewed interest in performances by Thomas Lloyd, Tonu Kaljuste, Łucasz Borowicz, Ingo Metzmacher (also on YouTube), Ezequiel Fautario, and Jeremy Thompson. A recording of these performances, none of which reached the commercial market, is available in the Bruckner Archive.

=== Records with organ intermezzo ===
- Eugen Jochum, Chor und Sinfonieorchester des Bayerischen Rundfunks, Elmar Schloter (organ). LP: DG 2530 314, 1972 – CD: DG 423 127-2 (box of 4 CDs)
- Matthew Best, Corydon Singers & Orchestra, James O'Donnell (organ). CD: Hyperion CDA66650, 1993 (with the Te Deum)
- Rupert Gottfried Frieberger, Hard-Chor Linz, Ars Antiqua Austria. CD: Fabian Records CD 5116, 2008
- Helmuth Froschauer, WDR Rundfunkchor and Rundfunkorchester, Cologne. CD: Crystal Classics N 67 085, 2010
- Matthias Giesen, Singakademie St Florian Chorus, Altomonte Orchestra St Florian - Brucknertage Music Festival 2018, 13 August 2018 – on CD Symphonic Choral Masterworks of Anton Bruckner, Bruckner Society BSA-006

=== Records with woodwind intermezzo ===
- F. Charles Adler, Choir of the Wiener Rundfunk and Wiener Symphoniker, LP: SPA 72, Lumen AMS 7, 1954 (Johann Gross edition).
  This historical recording has been remastered to CD: CRQ Editions CRQ CD 44, 2012.
- John Eliot Gardiner, live with the Monteverdi Choir and the Wiener Philharmoniker. CD: DG 459 674-2, 1996.
- Erwin Ortner, live with the Internationale Chorakademie Krems '96 and the Niederösterreichisches Kammerorchester. CD: da capo 68.24830, 1996
- Nicol Matt, Chamber Choir of Europe and Württembergische Philharmonie Reutlingen. CD: Brilliant SACD 92212, 2003.

== Sources ==
- Anton Bruckner: Sämtliche Werke: Band XVI: Messe d-Moll (1864), Musikwissenschaftlicher Verlag der Internationalen Bruckner-Gesellschaft, Leopold Nowak (editor), Vienna, 1975
- Max Auer, Anton Bruckner als Kirchenmusiker, Gustav Bosse Verlag, Regensburg, 1927, pp. 85–110
- Dika Newlin, A Gap is Filled - Bruckner's D Minor Mass in Disc Debut, Chord and Discord, Vol. 2, No. 8, 1958, P. 117.
- Paul-Gilbert Langevin, Bruckner, L'Âge d'Homme, Lausanne, 1977. ISBN 2-8251-0880-4
- Cornelis van Zwol, Anton Bruckner – Leven en Werken, Thot, Bussum (Netherlands), 2012. ISBN 90-686-8590-2
- John Williamson, The Cambridge Companion to Bruckner, Cambridge University Press, Cambridge, 2004. ISBN 0-521-80404-3
