= Missa solemnis (Bruckner) =

1854 solemn mass composed by Anton Bruckner

- Mass by Anton Bruckner
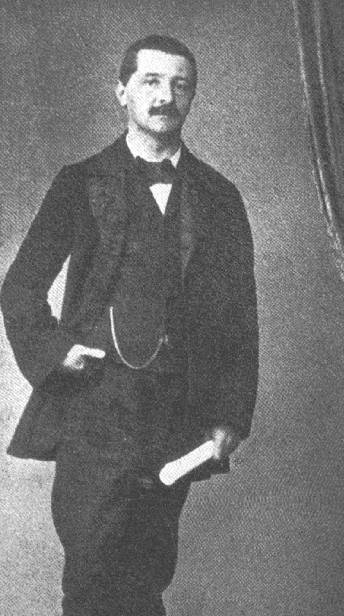
- The young Bruckner
- Key: B-flat minor
- Catalogue: WAB 29
- Dedication: Installation of Friedrich Mayer
- Performed: 1854: St. Florian Monastery
- Published: 1930
- Recorded: c. 1980
- Movements: 6
- Vocal: SATB choir and soloists
- Instrumental: Orchestra and organ

The Missa solemnis, WAB 29, is a solemn mass composed by Anton Bruckner in 1854 for the installation of Friedrich Mayer as abbot of St. Florian Monastery on 14 September 1854.

== History ==
Bruckner composed the Missa solemnis in 1854 for the installation of Friedrich Mayer as abbot of St. Florian Monastery. The Missa solemnis was performed during the installation of Friedrich Mayer on 14 September 1854. (Note: Mayer was appointed abbot following the death of Michael Arneth. On Friedrich Mayer see Rehberger, [Karl] [in German]. "Mayer, Friedrich (Theophil) (1793-1858), Propst". Österreichisches Biographisches Lexikon ab 1815 (online) (in German). Vol. 5. Austrian Academy of Sciences. p. 424.; Hawkshaw 2004, p. 45)

After Robert Führer saw the score, he suggested Bruckner study with Simon Sechter, and after seeing the mass, Sechter accepted Bruckner as a pupil. With the possible exception of Psalm 146, the Missa solemnis was the last major work Bruckner wrote before concluding his studies with Sechter, who did not allow his students to compose freely while studying with him.

A second performance of the Missa solemnis occurred two years after Bruckner's death, on 4 May 1898 (feast day of Saint Florian), in the St. Florian Abbey under the baton of choir director Berhard Deubler. On 29 March 1921, the Missa solemnis was performed again by August Göllerich during the seventh concert of the Linzer Bruckner-Stiftung.

== Setting ==
Bruckner composed the Missa solemnis, WAB 29, as a setting of the mass ordinary for vocal soloists (soprano, alto, tenor and bass), mixed choir, orchestra (2 oboes, 2 bassoons, 2 horns, 2 trumpets, alto, tenor and bass trombones, timpani, and strings) and organ.

According to Catholic practice – as in Bruckner's previous Messe für den Gründonnerstag and his later Mass No. 1 and Mass No. 2 – the first verse of the Gloria and the Credo is intoned by the priest in Gregorian mode before the choir continues. Unlike Bruckner's earlier Choral-Messen, the Gloria and the Credo of the Missa solemnis contain the larger text usually associated with these sections of the mass.

The setting is divided into six main parts:

1. Kyrie – Andante, B♭ minor
2. Gloria
  1. "Et in terra pax..." – Allegro, G minor veering to B♭ major
  2. "Qui tollis peccata mundi..." – Andante, G minor - bass soloist with solo oboe and choir
  3. "Quoniam tu solus sanctus..." – Allegro, B♭ major
3. Credo
  1. "Patrem omnipotentem..." – Allegro moderato, B♭ major
  2. "Et incarnatus est..." – Adagio, F major
  3. "Et ressurrexit tertia die..." – Allegro, moderato, B♭ major
  4. "Et vitam venturi saeculi..." – Allegro moderato, B♭ major
4. Sanctus – Moderato, B♭ major
5. Benedictus – Moderato, E♭ major
6. Agnus Dei
  1. "Agnus Dei..." – Adagio, B♭ major
  2. "Dona nobis pacem..." – Allegro, B♭ major

Total duration: about 31 minutes.

"Bruckner's Missa Solemnis is a musical summa of the first thirty years of his life." Stylistically the mass, in the line of Beethoven's orchestral masses, displays Bruckner's confrontation with tradition. In spite of many beautiful details, multiple influences afford the work some heterogeneity in which J. S. Bach's technique of the fugue is "amalgamated" with elements of the Viennese Classical and Preclassical periods, and of the early Romantic (Schubert).

The Quoniam quotes from Joseph Haydn's Missa Sancti Bernardi von Offida. As in Bruckner's later great masses, the setting of the words Et resurrexit is preceded by the "old-fashioned rhetorical gesture" of a "rising chromatic figure in stile agitato representing the trembling of the earth". This rising chromatic figure is repeated before the Et expecto resurrectionem mortuorum. Several passages of the Missa solemnis, particularly the Qui tollis of the Gloria and the central part of the Credo, prefigure Bruckner's next Mass No. 1 in D minor. Both the Gloria and the Credo conclude with a fugue.

Robert Simpson finds "nothing mediocre or tentative about this strong and clear work ... the music is often of excellent quality ... the work, though not perfect, is admirable."

== Editions ==
The edition by Robert Haas for the Gesamtausgabe was based on the copy given to Mayer. During the 1930s Ferdinand Habel changed the text of bars 28–38 of the Kyrie and bars 57–58 of the Gloria to make the work more usable for Eucharist celebration.

Leopold Nowak rejected these changes in his edition, which also introduced phrasing marks in some violin parts that had not been available to Haas.

On 25 June 2017 a new edition of the score by Benjamin-Gunnar Cohrs, prepared for the Anton Bruckner Urtext Gesamtausgabe, was premiered by Łukasz Borowicz with the RIAS Kammerchor and the Akademie für Alte Musik Berlin.

== Discography ==
There are five commercial recordings of the work. The three earlier recordings follow the Haas edition with Habel's text adaptations. Rickenbacker follows the Nowak edition.

According to Hans Roelofs, Hausmann's recording (1983) is a remarkable achievement for a non-professional choir. Rickenbacher delivers a recording with excellent sound, Jürgens always seems to be aware of the fact that he is performing a mass in which praise and humility complement each other − Both on a high musical level.

The recording by Borowicz is a performance of the Missa solemnis based on the new Urtext edition by Cohrs. Moreover, an attempt has been made to partially reconstruct the musical program of the Inauguration Mass for prelate Friedrich Theophil Mayer, which took place on 14 September 1854 in St. Florian.

- Hubert Gunther, Bruckner - Missa Solemnis in B, Rheinische Singgemeinschaft and BRT-Radio Symfonieorkest – LP: Garnet G 40 170, c. 1980
- Elmar Hausmann, Anton Bruckner – Missa solemnis in B, Motetten, Chorus and orchestra, Basilica of the Holy Apostles, Cologne – LP: Aulos AUL 53569, 1983
- Jürgen Jürgens, Anton Bruckner – Music of the St. Florian Period, Monteverdi-Chor and Israel Chamber Orchestra – LP: Jerusalem Records ATD 8503, 1984 (Bruckner Archive Production). Transferred to CD BSVD-0109, 2011
- Karl Anton Rickenbacher, Bruckner - Missa Solemnis, Psalm 112 & Psalm 150, Chorus and orchestra Bamberg Symphony – CD: Virgin Classics VC 7 91481, 1990
- Łukasz Borowicz, RIAS Kammerchor, Akademie für Alte Musik Berlin, Raphael Alpermann (Organ), Anton Bruckner – Missa solemnis – CD: Accentus ACC 30429, 2017 (Cohrs edition, 2017)
