= Angst der Hellen und Friede der Seelen =

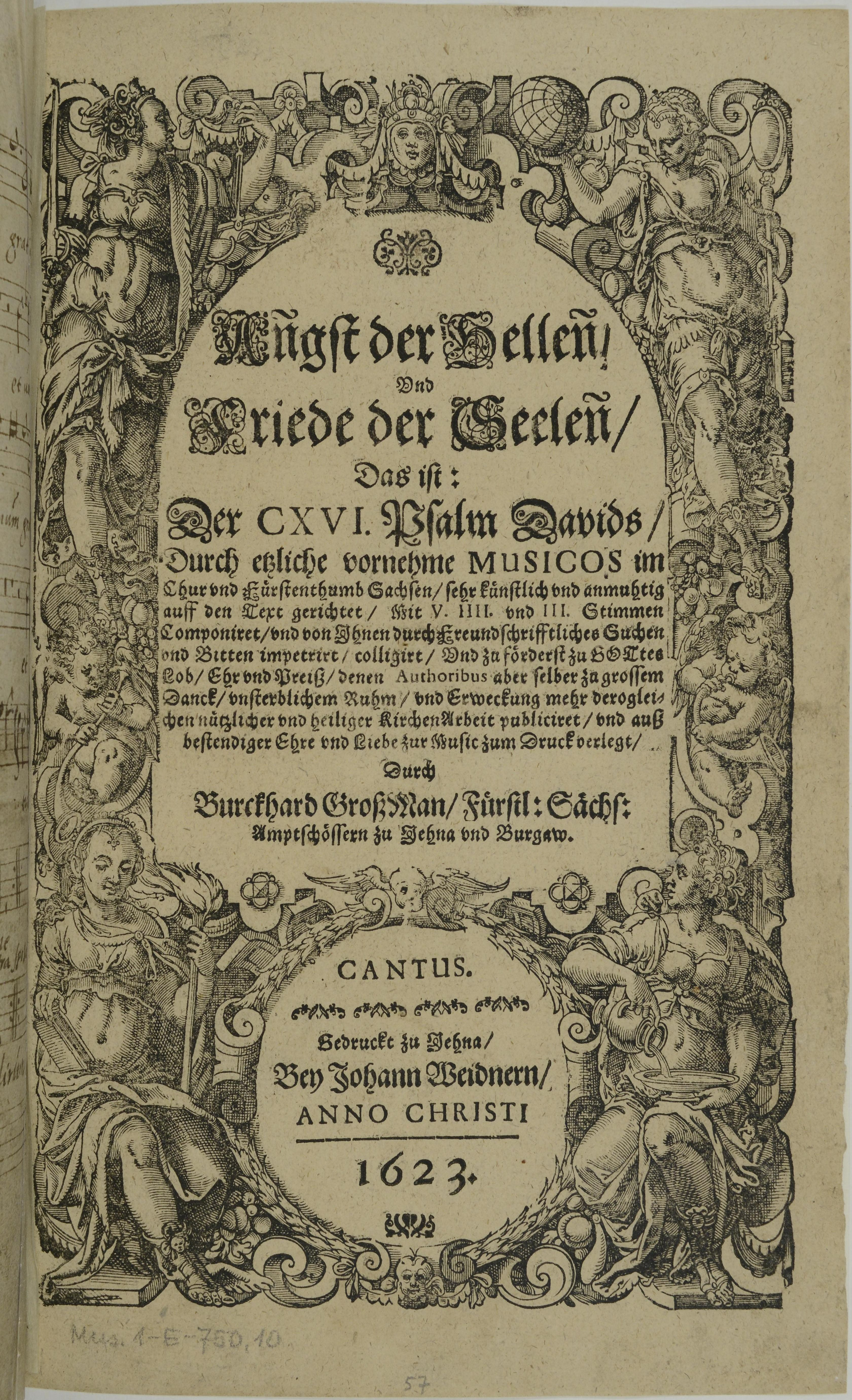
Title page

Angst der Hellen und Friede der Seelen ("Fear of Hell and Peace of the Soul") is a collection of sixteen settings of Psalm 116 in German, "Das ist mir lieb" (Psalms 116), commissioned by the Jena merchant Burckhard Grossmann in 1616 and eventually published in 1623. The composers are Heinrich Schütz, then in alphabetical order Michael Altenburg, Christoph Demantius, Nicolaus Erich, Andreas Finold, Melchior Franck, Abraham Gensreff, Johannes Groh, Johann Krause, Christian Michael, Daniel Michael, Rogier Michael, Tobias Michael, Michael Praetorius, Johann Hermann Schein and Caspar Trost. The settings range in complexity from that of Schütz, for 7 voices, down to settings for 3 or 2 voices. The setting of Schütz (SWV 51) has been recorded several times, the whole collection was recorded by the Alsfelder Vocal Ensemble and Musica Fiata Köln under Wolfgang Helbich in August 1994.
