= Wandrers Sturmlied =

- Choral work by Richard Strauss
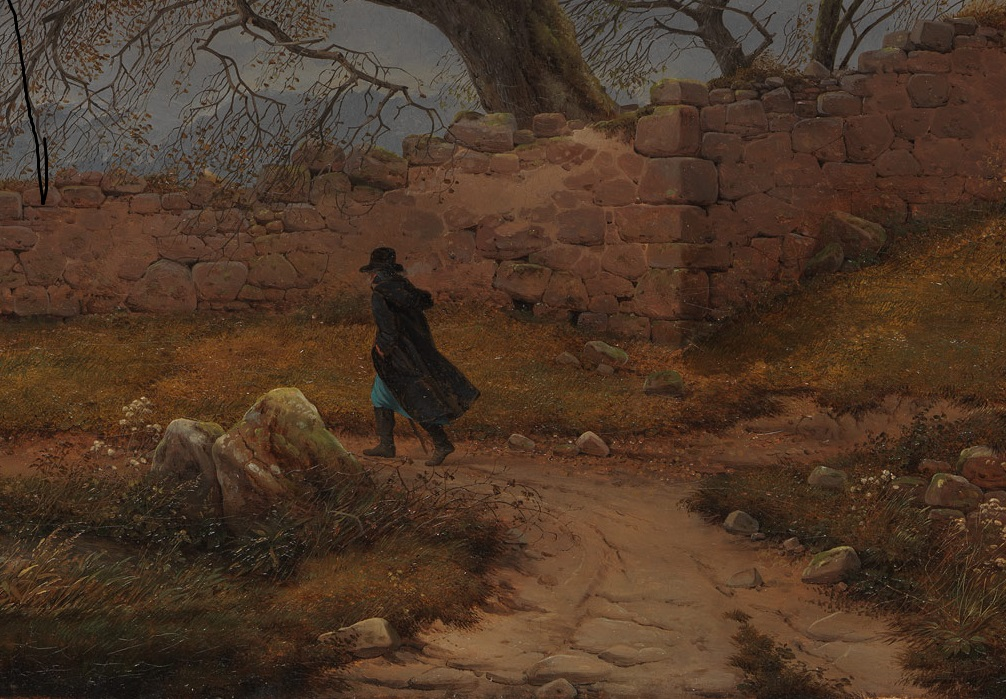
- Wanderer in the Storm (detail), painting by Julius von Leypold, 1835
- English: Wanderer's Storm Song
- Key: D minor, D major
- Catalogue: TrV 131
- Opus: 14
- Text: "Wandrers Sturmlied" by Johann Wolfgang von Goethe
- Language: German
- Composed: 1884
- Dedication: Franz Wüllner
- Scoring: Mixed choir SSATBB and orchestra

Wanderer's Storm Song (German: Wandrers Sturmlied), Op. 14, TrV 131, is a choral work for choir and orchestra written by Richard Strauss in 1884, based on a 1772 poem by Johann Wolfgang von Goethe of the same title.

== Composition history ==
The piece was written when Strauss had come under the influence of the music of Johannes Brahms. It was completed on 22 May 1884. The work was premiered in Cologne with Strauss conducting the city orchestra and choir on 8 March 1887. The choir is divided into six parts: two sopranos, alto, tenor and two bass. The work is dedicated to Franz Wüllner who had conducted the German premiere of Strauss' Symphony 2 in January 1885.

== Instrumentation ==
The orchestral arrangement calls for:

- One piccolo, two flutes, two oboes, two clarinets in B, two bassoons, one contrabassoon
- Four French horns in F, two trumpets in D, three trombones
- Timpani
- Strings

== Lyrics ==
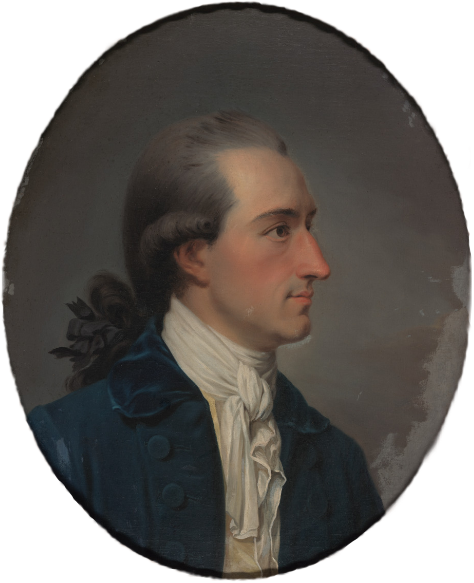
Johann Wolfgang von Goethe (portrait by Georg Oswald May, 1779

Strauss sets the first 38 lines of Goethe's 116 line poem.

Wandrers Sturmlied
Wen du nicht verlässest, Genius,
Nicht der Regen, nicht der Sturm
Haucht ihm Schauer übers Herz.
Wen du nicht verlässest, Genius,
Wird dem Regengewölk,
Wird dem Schloßensturm
Entgegensingen,
Wie die Lerche,
Du da droben.

Den du nicht verlässest, Genius,
Wirst ihn heben übern Schlammpfad
Mit den Feuerflügeln.
Wandeln wird er
Wie mit Blumenfüßen
Über Deukalions Flutschlamm,
Python tötend, leicht, groß,
Pythius Apollo.

Den du nicht verlässest, Genius,
Wirst die wollnen Flügel unterspreiten,
Wenn er auf dem Felsen schläft,
Wirst mit Hüterfittichen ihn decken
In des Haines Mitternacht.

Wen du nicht verlässest, Genius,
Wirst im Schneegestöber
Wärmumhüllen;
Nach der Wärme ziehn sich Musen,
Nach der Wärme Charitinnen.
Umschwebt mich, ihr Musen, ihr Charitinnen!
Das ist Wasser, das ist Erde,
Und der Sohn des Wassers und der Erde,
Über den ich wandle
Göttergleich.

Ihr seid rein, wie das Herz der Wasser,
Ihr seid rein, wie das Mark der Erde,
Ihr umschwebt mich, und ich schwebe
Über Wasser, über Erde,
Göttergleich.

The Wanderer's Storm Song
He whom thou ne'er leavest, Genius,
Feels no dread within his heart
At the tempest or the rain.
He whom thou ne'er leavest, Genius,
Will to the rain-clouds,
Will to the hailstorm,
Sing in reply
As the lark sings,
Oh thou on high!

Him whom thou ne'er leavest, Genius,
Thou wilt raise above the mud-track
With thy fiery pinions.
He will wander,
As, with flowery feet,
Over Deucalion's dark flood,
Python-slaying, light, glorious,
Pythius Apollo.

Him whom thou ne'er leavest, Genius,
Thou wilt place upon thy fleecy pinion
When he sleepeth on the rock,--
Thou wilt shelter with thy guardian wing
In the forest's midnight hour.

Him whom thou ne'er leavest, Genius,
Thou wilt wrap up warmly
In the snow-drift;
Tow'rd the warmth approach the Muses,
Tow'rd the warmth approach the Graces.
Ye Muses, hover round me! Ye Graces also!
That is water, that is earth,
And the son of water and of earth
Over which I wander,
Like the gods.

Ye are pure, like the heart of the water,
Ye are pure like the marrow of earth,
Hov'ring round me, while I hover
Over water, o'er the earth
Like the gods.
