= Christus factus est =

Gregorian chant

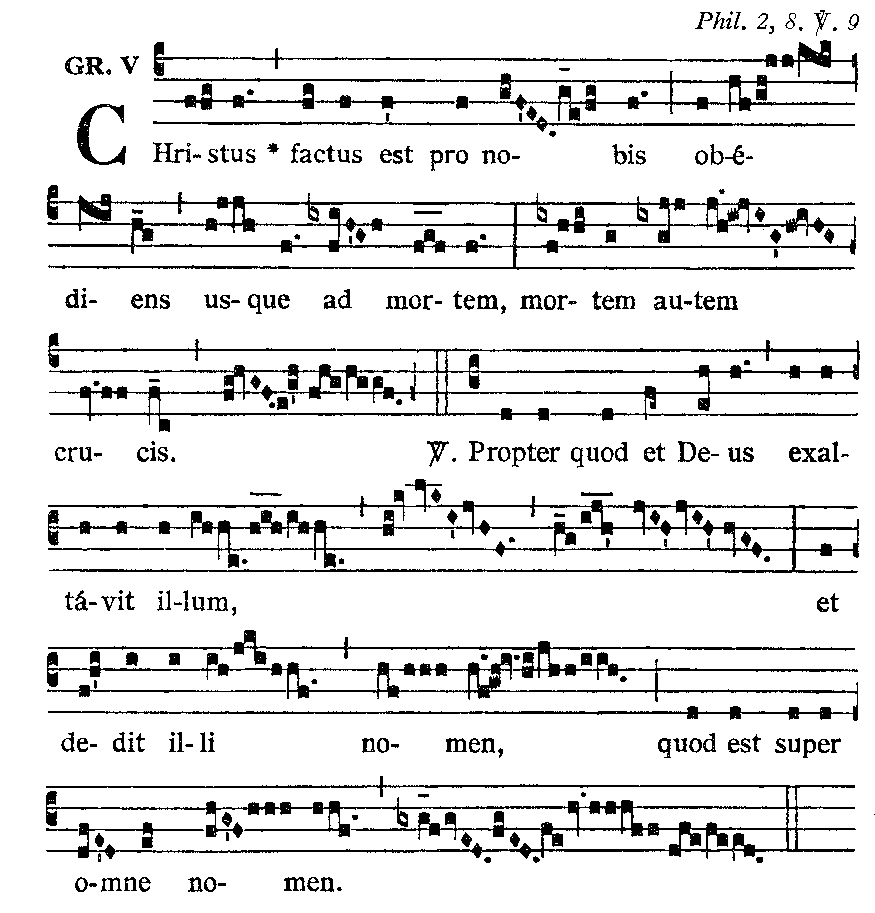

Christus factus est ("Christ became obedient") is taken from Saint Paul's Epistle to the Philippians. It is a gradual in the Catholic liturgy of the Mass. In pre-Vatican II Roman Rite practice, it was sung as the gradual at Mass on Maundy Thursday, however since the promulgation of the post-Vatican II Mass by Pope Paul VI in 1969 it has been employed instead as the gradual on Palm Sunday. Up until 1970, it was also sung daily at the conclusion of Tenebrae (Matins and Lauds) on the last days of Holy Week. It appeared first at Tenebrae of Maundy Thursday, but was recited only until "...usque ad mortem". The following day at Tenebrae of Good Friday, it was sung from the beginning until "...mortem autem crucis", then at Tenebrae of Holy Saturday when it was sung in full. Until the 1955 liturgical reforms of Pius XII, each Tenebrae service were sung in the late afternoon and evening of the previous day, and were well-attended by the laity. Thus, the Tenebrae of Maundy Thursday was sung in the evening of Spy Wednesday; Tenebrae of Good Friday in the evening Maundy Thursday, etc. For this reason, Christus factus est (along with the famous Tenebrae responsories) was set by many composers of liturgical music. From 1956 through 1969, and in the liturgical books of 1962 which are currently in use as the extraordinary form of the Roman Rite, the timing of these services have been moved to the early mornings of the last three days of Holy Week, with the effect that complex musical settings of this text are rarely heard in their intended liturgical context.

== Text ==
The text is derived from Philippians 2:8–9.

Christus factus est pro nobis obediens
usque ad mortem, mortem autem crucis.
Propter quod et Deus exaltavit illum et dedit illi nomen,
quod est super omne nomen.

Christ became obedient for us
even unto death, death on the cross.
Therefore God exalted Him and gave Him a name
which is above all names.

In the Roman Rite liturgy, it is used as the Gregorian gradual on Palm Sunday, Maundy Thursday and Good Friday. The melody is found in the Graduale Romanum, 1974, p. 148. Over the centuries, this text has been set to music by several composers.

Anton Bruckner set the text to music three times. He set it first in 1844 as the gradual of the Messe für den Gründonnerstag (WAB 9). The second setting Christus factus est, WAB 10 of 1873 is a motet in D minor for eight-voice mixed choir, 3 trombones, and double bass quintet ad libitum. The third setting Christus factus est, WAB 11 of 1884 is a motet for SATB choir a cappella in D minor. This third setting is, with Locus iste and Ave Maria, among Bruckner's most popular motets.

== See also ==
- Crotalus (instrument) – Christian liturgical instrument
- Stripping of the Altar – Religious ceremony

== Sources ==
- Anton Bruckner - Sämtliche Werke, Band 21: Kleine Kirchenmusikwerke, Musikwissenschaftlicher Verlag der Internationalen Bruckner-Gesellschaft, Hans Bauernfeind and Leopold Nowak (Eds.), Vienna, 1984
- Cornelis van Zwol, Anton Bruckner - Leven en Werken , Thoth, Bussum (Netherlands), 2012. ISBN 90-686-8590-2
