= Psalm 150 (Bruckner) =

Musical psalm setting by Anton Bruckner

- by Anton Bruckner
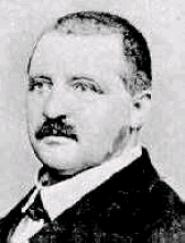
- The composer, c. 1860
- Key: C major
- Catalogue: WAB 38
- Form: Psalm setting from the Luther Bible
- Occasion: Opening of the Internationale Ausstellung für Musik und Theatherwesen
- Text: Psalms 150
- Language: German
- Performed: 13 November 1892: Musikvereinsaal, Vienna
- Recorded: c. 1950 by Henry Swoboda
- Vocal: SATB choir and soprano soloist
- Instrumental: Orchestra

Anton Bruckner's Psalm 150, WAB 38, is a setting of Psalm 150 for mixed chorus, soprano soloist and orchestra written in 1892.

== History ==
Richard Heuberger asked Bruckner for a festive hymn to celebrate the opening of the exposition Internationale Ausstellung für Musik und Theatherwesen on 7 May 1892, but Bruckner did not deliver the piece in time for Heuberger's purpose.

The work was premiered in the Musikvereinsaal in Vienna on 13 November 1892, with the Wiener Singverein and the soprano soloist Henriette Standthartner and Wilhelm Gericke conducting. The concert also included a Schubert overture and Liszt's Piano Concerto in E-flat major, followed by Richard Strauss' Wandrers Sturmlied and Mendelssohn's Loreley.

The manuscript, which was dedicated to Wilhelm Ritter von Hartel, is stored in the archive of the Austrian National Library. It was first issued in November 1892 with another dedication to Max von Oberleithner, by Musikverlag Doblinger, as well as a vocal and piano reduction score by Cyrill Hynais. The work is issued by Franz Grasberger in volume XX/6 of the Gesamtausgabe.

== Text ==
Vermahnung zum Lobe Gottes (Exhortation for praising God)

1. Halleluja. Lobet den Herrn in seinem Heiligthum; lobet ihn in der Feste seiner Macht
2. Lobet ihn in seinen Thaten; lobet ihn in seiner großen Herrlichkeit
3. Lobet ihn mit Posaunen; lobet ihn mit Psalter und Harfe
4. Lobet ihn mit Pauken und Reigen; lobet ihn mit Saiten und Pfeifen
5. Lobet ihn mit hellen Cymbeln; lobet ihn mit wohlklingenden Cymbeln
6. Alles, was Odem hat, lobe den Herrn, Halleluja

== Setting ==
Bruckner's Psalm 150 in C major is scored for SATB choir and soprano soloist, and orchestra (2 flutes, 2 oboes, 2 clarinets, 2 bassoons, 4 horns, 3 trumpets, 3 trombones (alto, tenor and bass), contrabass tuba, timpani, and strings).

Unlike the other psalm settings composed some 40 years earlier, for which he used a German-language Bible approved by the Catholic Church, Bruckner used this time the German-language Luther Bible for the text.

The 247-bar long piece starts out in C major, alla breve, with a tempo marking of Mehr langsam! Feierlich, kräftig (More slowly! Festive, strong) as the choir sings "Hallelujah" several times before moving on to the second line of the psalm. At rehearsal letter E, marked Bewegter (more moving), begins the listing of instruments with which to praise God. At J, Langsamer (More slowly) follows "Alles, Alles lobe den Herrn" At K, with a return to the initial tempo, Bruckner repeats the opening "Hallelujahs", but at L (bar 165) follows with "a complex fugue" starting with the words "Alles, was Odem hat" once again Langsam (Slowly). Another return to the initial tempo at R marks the beginning of the coda with the words "Alles, alles lobe den Herrn". The theme of the fugue is related to that of the fugue of Bruckner's fifth symphony and that of the Adagio of his ninth symphony.

The last time Bruckner improvised at the organ, he used melodies from this psalm setting. Psalm 150 "shares both the key and the triumphant mood of rapturous exaltation of the Te Deum."

== Selected discography ==
The first recording (c. 1950) was by Henry Swoboda with the Wiener Akademie Kammerchor and the Wiener Symphoniker, LP: Westminster WAL 201 (with Symphony No. 6 and Psalm 112). Swoboda's historical performances of Psalms 112 & 150 and Richard Strauss' Wandrers Sturmlied have been recently transferred to CD by Klassic Haus Restorations.

Among the ten other recordings, Hans Roelofs selects the following four recordings:

- Eugen Jochum, Chor der Deutschen Oper Berlin and Berliner Philharmoniker, 1965, LP: DG SLPM 139137/8 (with Symphony No. 7). This recording, which has been transferred to CD as part of the 4-CD box set DG 423 127-2, remains according to Hans Roelofs the reference.
- Daniel Barenboim, Chicago Symphony Orchestra & Chorus, 1979, LP: DG 2707 116. This recording has been transferred to CD: DG 437 250-2 (with Symphony No. 0 and Helgoland). It is more widely available as part of a ten-CD set DG 477 8903 containing Symphonies 0-9, the Te Deum, and Helgoland.
- Matthew Best, Corydon Singers & Orchestra, 1992, CD: Hyperion CDA66599 (with Mass No. 3)
- Helmuth Rilling, Gächinger Kantorei and Bach-Collegium Stuttgart, 1996, CD: Hänssler Classic 98.119 (with Mass No. 2 and the Te Deum)
