= Daniel Reuss =

Dutch conductor (born 1961)

Daniel Reuss (born 2 July 1961, in Leiden) is a Dutch German conductor, primarily known as a choral conductor.

== Biography ==
Daniel Reuss studied with Barend Schuurman at the Rotterdam Conservatory in the Netherlands.

In 1982, he founded the Oude Muziek Koor Arnhem, which attained a very high level of performance. It decided to expire in June 2007 after 25 years. From 1988 until 1998, Daniel Reuss also conducted vocal ensemble VENUS. This chamber choir consists of 26 advanced amateurs who perform twice a year with a combination of classical and modern choral repertoire and commissioned compositions.

From 1990 until 1997, he conducted the Dutch Student Chamber Choir, that focuses on bringing young talent together.

In 1990, he became director of Cappella Amsterdam, which he turned into a full-time professional ensemble that is now one of the most sought after in the Netherlands.

From 2003 until 2007 he was chief conductor of the RIAS Kammerchor in Berlin, with whom he recorded a number of successful CDs. In these years, his career began to take him all over Europe.

In the summer of 2006, at the invitation of Pierre Boulez, Daniel Reuss taught and conducted at the summer 2006 Lucerne Festival Academy.

In February 2007, Reuss made his debut at the English National Opera with Händel's Agrippina.

== Examples of works on CD ==
- Dutch Student Chamber Choir, Daniel Reuss, Rudolf Escher, Carlos Micháns, Lowell Dijkstra, and Ton de Leeuw. Time will say nothing. Rotterdam: Erasmus, 1995. OCLC 44163113
- Works by Martin and Messiaen (released by Harmonia Mundi) won both the "Diapason d'or de l'année 2004" and the "Preis der Deutschen Schallplattenkritik".
- Works by Stravinsky (Les Noces, Cantata and Mass) have also been critically acclaimed.
- Martin's Le Vin herbé (spring 2007).
- Händel's Solomon (autumn 2007).
- In Umbra Mortis (Wolfgang Rihm & Giaches de Wert) (Pentatone, 2021)
- David Lang The Writings (Pentatone, 2022)
- Igor Stravinsky - Late Works (PENTATONE, 2025), Cappella Amsterdam
