= Matthew Best (conductor) =

English bass singer and conductor (1957–2025)

- Born: Matthew Robert Best; 6 February 1957; Farnborough, Kent, England
- Died: 10 May 2025 (aged 68)
- Education: King's College, Cambridge
- Occupations: Operatic bass; composer; conductor; academic
- Organizations: Corydon Singers; Royal Northern College of Music
- Spouse: Rosalind Mayes (m. 1983)
- Children: 2

Matthew Robert Best (6 February 1957 – 10 May 2025) was an English bass singer, choral conductor, composer and academic. He had a long career as a singer at major opera houses of the United Kingdom including the Royal Opera House and the English National Opera, performing lead roles such as Wotan in Wagner's Der Ring des Nibelungen.

Best was recognised internationally as conductor of vocal music performed with his ensemble Corydon Singers which he founded at age 16; their recordings of works by Anton Bruckner have been regarded as excellent and earned awards. He taught voice at the Royal Northern College of Music from 2015 until 2024.

== Life and career ==
Best was born in Farnborough on 6 February 1957. the son of Peter Best and his wife Mary née Reid. He first learned to play the clarinet and became interested in singing and conducting as a teenager. He said in an interview that he was spellbound when he heard a Wagner opera on radio. He attended Sevenoaks School where his opera, Humbug, was performed. He founded the Corydon Singers vocal ensemble there in 1973, initially for a single concert. Best sang as a member of the Monteverdi Choir and was awarded a choral scholarship.

Best studied at King's College, Cambridge, from 1976 to 1979. He composed an operetta, Alice after Alice's Adventures in Wonderland, which was played at Cambridge, directed by Nicholas Hytner, in 1979. When it was performed at the Aldeburgh Festival, Peter Pears appeared as a guest. Best studied further at the National Opera Studio until 1980. He studied voice with Otakar Kraus, and later with Robert Lloyd and Patrick McGuigan. He appeared as Seneca in Monteverdi's L'incoronazione di Poppea in 1978 at the University.

=== Opera ===
Best made an early professional appearance as Snout in Britten's A Midsummer Night's Dream at the Aldeburgh Festival in 1980. He first performed at the Royal Opera House the same year in Verdi's Otello, with Jon Vickers in the title role. He appeared there until 1986 in roles including Colline in Puccini's La bohème. In 1982 he earned second prize, as runner-up to Anne Dawson, of the Kathleen Ferrier Awards. In 1989, he participated there in the premiere of Berio's Un re in ascolto. He appeared at the 1994 Edinburgh Festival as Pizarro in Beethoven's Fidelio. He performed the title role in Wagner's Der fliegende Holländer at the English National Opera in 1997, followed by Jochanaan in Salome by R. Strauss in 1999. He appeared as Wotan in Der Ring des Nibelungen in the Edinburgh International Festival's turn-of-the-century production.

His more than hundred roles also included Wagner's Heinrich in Lohengrin, both Kurwenal and Marke in Tristan und Isolde, and Amfortas in Parsifal, and Scarpia in Puccini's Tosca. He performed at major opera houses in the United Kingdom, noted for "vocal depth and dramatic versatility". Best performed as a guest internationally, in Hans Werner Henze's The English Cat at the Alte Oper in Frankfurt in 1986, and as Pizarro at the 1996 Lincoln Center Festival in New York City.

=== Choral conducting ===
Best founded the ensembles Corydon Singers in 1973 at age 16. They chose the name, referring to a rustic character, because it appeared in several of the madrigals from the 16th and 17th centuries that they sang in their early programs. They performed in concerts in London concert halls, but early on made recordings which achieved recognition, beginning with a collection of English choral music through the eras in 1981. Their first of many recordings with Hyperion was dedicated to Bruckner's motets. Their recording of Rachmaninoff's Vespers became part of the BBC Radio 3's Building a Library. They performed Duruflé's Requiem with the English Chamber Orchestra on tours in 1987.

Best founded the matching Corydon Orchestra in 1991. The groups performed until 2000. He was a guest conductor of many orchestras, including the English Chamber Orchestra. He was later also engaged as music director of the Academy Choir Wimbledon.

=== Teaching ===
Best was a principal study singing teacher at the Royal Northern College of Music from 2015 until 2024. He was awarded a fellowship of the Royal Northern College of Music in April 2025.

=== Personal life ===
Best married Rosalind Mayes in 1983; the couple had two children.

Best died of cancer on 10 May 2025, at the age of 68.

== Recordings ==
Best's recordings with the Corydon Singers, focused music by Bruckner, Brahms and Mendelssohn, received positive reviews. Their 1990 recording of Vaughan Williams' Serenade to Music and other works was selected as Record of the Year by both The Guardian and The Sunday Times, and was nominated for the Brit Awards. Their recording of Bruckner's Te Deum and Mass in D minor was selected as one of the top releases of 1993 by the BBC's Record Review.

Bruckner scholar Hans Roelofs described Best as a reference performer of Bruckner's religious music, for recordings of his Requiem, the Mass No. 2 (1882 version), Psalms 114 and 112; along with his motets, Mass No. 1, Mass No. 3, Two Aequali, Libera me (II), Te Deum and Psalm 150.

- Bruckner: Motets, Hyperion CDA66062, 1982 OCLC 15186237
- Bruckner: Mass in E minor, Libera me, Zwei Aequale, with English Chamber Orchestra wind ensemble, Hyperion CDA66177, 1985 OCLC 1425878509
- Bruckner: Requiem, Psalms 112 & 114, with English Chamber Orchestra, Hyperion CDA66245, 1987 OCLC 1101783883
- Bruckner: Mass in F minor, Psalm 150, with Corydon Orchestra, Hyperion CDA66599, 1992 OCLC 931107160
- Bruckner: Mass in D minor, Te Deum, with Corydon Orchestra, Hyperion CDA 66650, 1993 OCLC 1425260787
