= Carl Julius von Leypold =

German Romantic landscape painter (1806–1874)

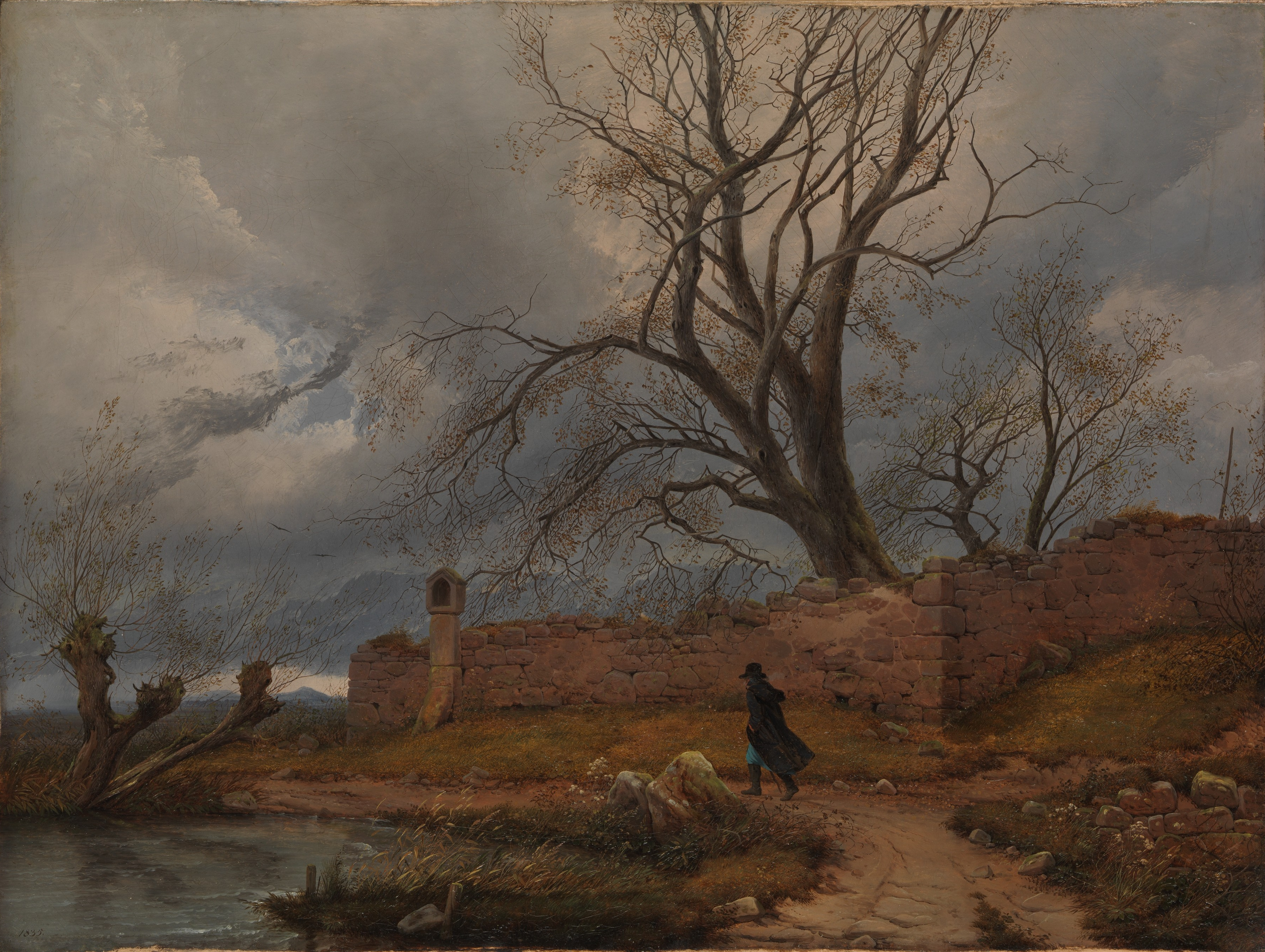
Wanderer in the Storm (1835)

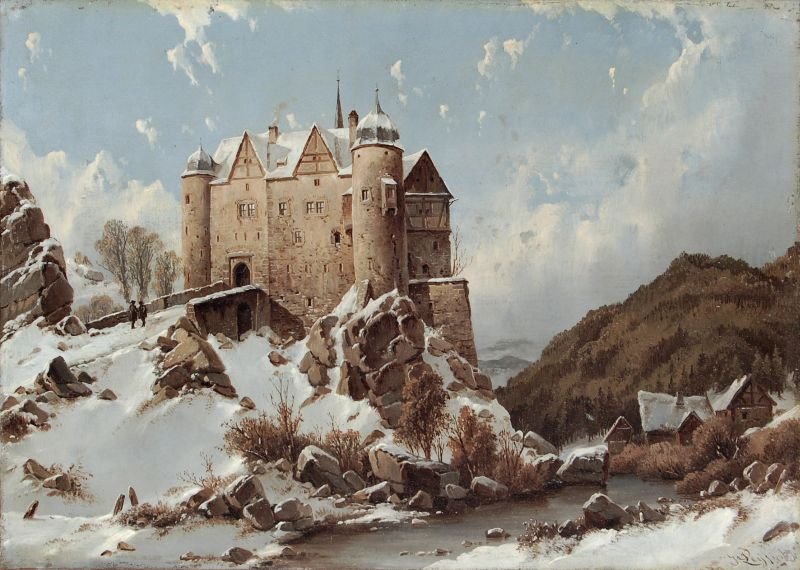
Castle Hill in Snow (1860)

Carl Julius von Leypold (1806–1874) was a German Romantic landscape painter known for his painting, "Wanderer in the Storm".

== Life ==
Von Leypold studied landscape painting with Johan Christian Dahl at the Dresden Academy of Fine Arts between 1820 and 1829 . From 1826 onwards, Caspar David Friedrich influenced his choice of subjects and painting style. His landscapes are characterized by "a painterly, but at the same time sharp-brushed style, in which high painting culture is combined with Biedermeier objectivity."

On March 5, 1857, he became an honorary member of the Dresden Art Academy.

== Works (selection) ==
- City Gate in Grossenhain
- City Wall of Halle
- The Albrechtsburg in Meissen
- The Castle Ruins in the Snow

Watercolors

- Ruin in Winter
- Ruins of a Castle

== Literature ==
- Leypold, Karl Julius von. In: Friedrich von Boetticher: Painter works of the 19th century. Contribution to art history. Volume 1/2, sheets 31–61: Heideck – Mayer, Louis. Ms. v. Boetticher's Verlag, Dresden 1895, pp. 860–861 ( Textarchiv - Internet Archive ).
- Leypold, Julius of . In: Hans Vollmer (Hrsg.): General lexicon of visual artists from antiquity to the present . Founded by Ulrich Thieme and Felix Becker . tape 23 : Leitenstorfer – Mander . EA Seemann, Leipzig 1929, p. 174 .
- Neidhardt: The painting of the romantic in Dresden. EA Seemann, Leipzig 1976.
