= Te Deum (Bruckner) =

Composition by Anton Bruckner

- by Anton Bruckner
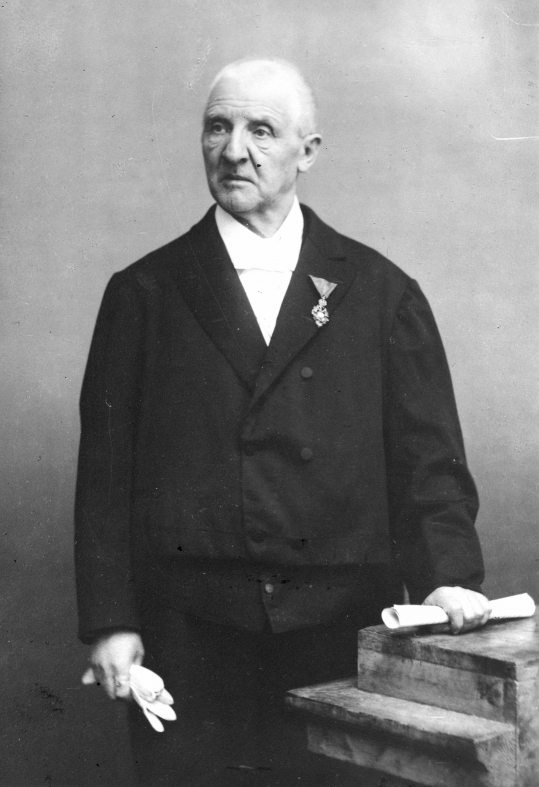
- The composer in 1886
- Key: C major
- Catalogue: WAB 45
- Text: Te Deum
- Composed: Draft version: 1881: Vienna; Final version: 1883: Vienna
- Dedication: Ad maiorem Dei gloriam
- Performed: 2 May 1885: Kleiner Musikvereinssaal, Vienna
- Published: 1885: Vienna
- Movements: 5
- Vocal: SATB choir and soloists
- Instrumental: Orchestra and organ ad lib.

The Te Deum in C major, WAB 45, is a setting of the Te Deum hymn, composed by Anton Bruckner for SATB choir and soloists, orchestra, and organ ad libitum.

== History ==
Bruckner started work on his Te Deum from 3 to 17 May 1881, when he was finalising his Symphony No. 6. After finishing his next Symphony No. 7, Bruckner resumed work on his Te Deum on 28 September 1883. The vocal and orchestral score was completed on 7 March 1884. The ad lib. organ part was added on a separate score on 16 March 1884. The composer dedicated the piece A.M.D.G. "in gratitude for having safely brought me through so much anguish in Vienna."

The Te Deum was premiered in the Kleiner Musikvereinssaal in Vienna on 2 May 1885, with soloists Frau Ulrich-Linde, Emilie Zips, Richard Exleben, and Heinrich Gassner, with the choir of the Wiener Akademischer Richard Wagner Verein, and Robert Erben and Joseph Schalk substituting for the orchestra on two pianos. Hans Richter conducted the first performance with full orchestra on 10 January 1886 in the Großer Musikvereinssaal in Vienna.

Thereafter, there were almost thirty more performances within Bruckner's lifetime. The last performance, which Bruckner attended, was conducted by Richard von Perger at the suggestion of Johannes Brahms. On his copy of the score, Gustav Mahler crossed out "für Chor, Soli und Orchester, Orgel ad libitum" (for choir, solos and orchestra, organ ad libitum) and wrote "für Engelzungen, Gottsucher, gequälte Herzen und im Feuer gereinigte Seelen!" (for the tongues of angels, seekers of God, chastened hearts, and souls purified in the fire!). The composer himself called the work "the pride of his life".

The first performance in the United States occurred at the Cincinnati May Festival on 26 May 1892. Theodore Thomas conducted the Chicago Symphony Orchestra, the Cincinnati May Festival Chorus and the soloists Corinne Moore-Lawson, Marie Ritter-Goetze, Edward Lloyd and George Ellsworth Holmes.

The draft version of 1881 and the first sketch of 1883 are stored in the archive of the Kremsmünster Abbey. The voice and orchestral score, and the ad lib. organ score of 1884 are stored in the archive of the Österreichische Nationalbibliothek.

== Versions and editions ==
- Draft version of 1881 (Ed. Franz Scheder)

The draft version of 1881, the manuscript of which is stored in the archive of the Kremsmünster Abbey, includes the vocal scores and some basic orchestration. It is shorter than the final version (357 bars versus 513 bars). In particular, the Aeterna fac is different and much shorter, and the final fugue is not yet composed.

- Final version of 1884: Rättig, Vienna (1885), Nowak (1962)

The Te Deum was first published in 1885 by Theodore Rättig, who paid Bruckner 50 florins, "the only money he ever earned as a composer in the whole of his life." Another important difference with Bruckner's other first publications is that there are few differences between it and the original manuscript. "The most important [difference] being the absence of the trombone and double-bass tuba chords at bars 275 and 283 of the "Salvum fac" section. At bar 26 the second clarinet has a different note, and in the first edition the clarinets are in B flat instead of in A as in the original manuscript." with no recomposition from the Schalk brothers.

== Setting ==
The work is set for SATB choir and soloists, orchestra (2 flutes, 2 oboes, 2 clarinets in A, 2 bassoons, 4 horns in F, 3 trumpets in F, alto, tenor and bass trombones, contrabass tuba, timpani in C and G, and strings), and organ ad libitum .

The setting in "arch form" is in five sections:

1. "Te Deum laudamus" – Allegro, Feierlich, mit Kraft, C major
2. "Te ergo quaesumus" – Moderato, F minor
3. "Aeterna fac" – Allegro, Feierlich, mit Kraft, D minor
4. "Salvum fac populum tuum" – Moderato, F minor
5. "In Te, Domine speravi" – Mäßig bewegt, C major

Total duration: about 24 minutes.

The first section opens in blazing C major by the choir in unison, propelled by a powerful open-fifth pedal point by the organ and open-fifths motive in the strings. Thereafter, the soloists and the choir enter as the music moves through distinctly Brucknerian processes and modulations. The second section in F minor ("Te ergo quaesumus") is serene and imploring in nature, featuring an expressive tenor solo and a solo violin. The third section ("Aeterna fac"), in Bruckner's favoured key of D minor, is almost apocalyptic in its fury. Propelled by a rhythmic device, it draws on the full resources of the choir and orchestra before coming to an abrupt unresolved cadence. The fourth section ("Salvum fac populum tuum"), which begins as a repeat of the second section, this time with women's voices accompanying the tenor, evolves, after a bass solo and a pedal point by the choir on "et rege eos, et extólle illos usque in aeternum", to the "Per singulos dies" sub-section, which recalls the fervour and energy of the opening. The final section in C major, which begins with the solo quartet, culminates in a joyous fugue, followed by an impassioned chorale on the words "non confundar in aeternum", which is same to the main theme of the Adagio of Symphony No. 7. The opening string figure returns, as the full ensemble carries the work to a powerful conclusion.

=== Note ===
In the 1890s Bruckner was aware that he might not live to finish his Symphony No. 9, and some commentators have suggested that the Te Deum could be used as a finale. However, Robert Simpson believed that not "even in the poor state of health and mind of his last few months of his life, [would Bruckner have] considered the use of the C major Te Deum as finale to a D minor symphony to be more than a makeshift solution," and that the link to the Te Deum was simply a matter of self-quotation more than anything else.

== Selected discography ==
=== Draft version of 1881 ===
There is a single issue of this draft version:

- Klaus Dieter Stolper, Ad hoc Chor with restored piano accompaniment by Annie Gicquel, Nuremberg, live 07-10-2003 – CD Noris Ton, private issue (with Symphony No. 7 by the Bayrisches Ärzteorchester).

=== Final version of 1884 ===
The first recording was by Felix Gatz with the Bruckner-Chor & the Staatskapelle Berlin in 1927: 78 rpm disc Decca 25159 (only part 1 and beginning of part 4). This historic recording can be heard on John Berky's website.
The first complete recording was by Bruno Walter with the Choir of the Wiener Staatsoper and the Vienna Philharmonic in 1937.

During the Nazi era, Bruckner's Te Deum and Psalm 150 were ignored, because their existence contradicted the Nazi myth that exposure to Richard Wagner's music had freed Bruckner from ties to the church. It was not until after the war that Eugen Jochum brought attention to Bruckner's Te Deum and other sacred music, conducting several concerts and recordings. Herbert von Karajan, Bruno Walter and Volkmar Andreae soon followed suit.

Some of these postwar recordings:

- Eugen Jochum, Chor und Sinfonieorchester des Bayerischen Rundfunks – 78 rpm disc Polydor 72020-1, 1950; transferred later to LP: DG 16002, and CD: Forgotten Records fr 227/8 (with Symphony No. 7)
- Herbert von Karajan, Singverein der Gesellschaft der Musikfreunde Wien and Vienna Symphonic Orchestra – LP: Melodram DSM B01, 1952; transferred to CD: Arkadia CDGI 705.2 (with Symphony No. 8)
- Bruno Walter, Westminster Choir, New York Philharmonic – LP: Columbia ML6EYE 4980, 1953; transferred later to CD: CD: Sony SMK 64 480 (with Mozart's Requiem)
- Volkmar Andreae, Singverein der Gesellschaft der Musikfreunde Wien, Vienna Symphonic Orchestra, 1953 – CD: Music & Arts 1227 (9 CDs, incl. Symphonies 1-9)

There are more than 100 recordings of Bruckner's Te Deum, mainly together with a symphony or another choral work. According to Hans Roelofs, Jochum's recording of 1965 still remains the reference. Other excellent recordings, according to Hans Roelofs, are i.a. those by Rögner, Barenboim, Best, Rilling and Luna.

- Eugen Jochum, Chor der Deutschen Oper Berlin, Berliner Philharmoniker, Wolfgang Meyer (organ) – LP: DG 139117/8, 1965 (with Symphony No. 9); transferred later to CD: DG 413 603.
- Herbert von Karajan, Singverein der Gesellschaft der Musikfreunde Wien, Berliner Philharmoniker, Rudolf Scholz (Organ) – LP: DG 2530 704, 1975 (with Mozart's Coronation Mass); transferred later to CD: DG 453 091-2 (with Verdi's Requiem)
- Daniel Barenboim, Chicago Symphony Orchestra and Chorus – LP: DG 2741 007 (with Symphony No. 8), 1981; transferred later to CD: DG 435 068 (with Symphony No. 1)
- Heinz Rögner, Rundfunkchor Berlin and RSO East-Berlin – CD: Ars Vivendi 2100 172, 1988 (with Mass No. 2)
- Matthew Best, Corydon Singers and Orchestra, James O'Donnell (organ) – CD Hyperion CDA66650, 1993 (with Mass No. 1)
- Helmuth Rilling, Gächinger Kantorei Stuttgart and Bach-Collegium Stuttgart – CD: Hänssler 98.119, 1996 (with Mass No. 2 and Psalm 150)
- Ricardo Luna, Wiener Madrigalchor, Chorvereinigung Schola Cantorum and Symphonic orchestra of the Vienna Volksoper, István Mátiás (organ) – CD issued by the Wiener Madrigalchor: WMCH 024, 2008 live (with Mass No. 3).

== Sources ==
- Max Auer, Anton Bruckner als Kirchenmusiker, {Gustav Bosse Verlag, Regensburg, 1927
- Anton Bruckner – Sämtliche Werke, Band XIX: Te Deum, Musikwissenschaftlicher Verlag der Internationalen Bruckner-Gesellschaft, Leopold Nowak (editor), Vienna, 1962
- Robert Simpson, The Essence of Bruckner: An essay towards the understanding of his music, Victor Gollancz, London, 1967
- Hans-Hubert Schönzeler, Bruckner, Marion Boyars, London, 1978
- Derek Watson, Bruckner, J. M. Dent & Sons, London, 1975
- Uwe Harten, Anton Bruckner. Ein Handbuch. Residenz Verlag, Salzburg, 1996. ISBN 3-7017-1030-9
- Bryan Gilliam, "The annexation of Anton Bruckner", Bruckner Studies, edited by Timothy L. Jackson and Paul Hawkshaw, Cambridge University Press, Cambridge, 1997
- Keith William Kinder, The Wind and Wind-Chorus Music of Anton Bruckner, Greenwood Press, Westport, Connecticut, 2000
- Cornelis van Zwol, Anton Bruckner – Leven en Werken, Thot, Bussum (Netherlands), 2012. ISBN 90-686-8590-2
