= Messe für den Gründonnerstag =

1844 missa brevis composed by Anton Bruckner

- Mass by Anton Bruckner
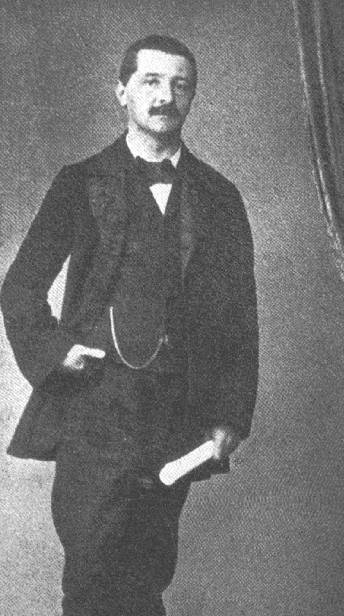
- The young Bruckner
- Key: F major
- Catalogue: WAB 9
- Form: Missa brevis
- Composed: 1844–1845: Kronstorf
- Dedication: Ad maiorem Dei gloriam
- Published: 1932: Regensburg
- Movements: 8 (2 lost)
- Vocal: SATB choir

The Messe für den Gründonnerstag (Mass for Maundy Thursday), WAB 9, is a missa brevis composed by Anton Bruckner in 1844.

== History ==
Bruckner composed the Messe für den Gründonnerstag, a Choral-Messe in F major (WAB 9) for mixed choir a cappella, in 1844 while he was a schoolteacher's assistant in Kronstorf. Bruckner dedicated the work to A.M.D.G.

The work, the manuscript of which is stored in the archive of Wels, was first published in band I, pp. 258–274 of the Göllerich/Auer biography. Thereafter, only the Gradual Christus factus est was issued by Anton Böhm & Sohn in 1931, so that the work was listed by Grasberger as Christus factus est, WAB 9.

The full setting of the mass is published in volume XXI/5 of the Gesamtausgabe.

== Setting ==
The work is divided into six parts:

1. Gradual Christus factus est, F major
2. Credo, C major
3. Offertory Dextera Domini, F major
4. Sanctus, E♭ major
5. Benedictus, G major
6. Agnus Dei, F major

Total duration: about 10 minutes.

On the front page of Bruckner's manuscript is written:

Vierstimmige Choral-Messe ohne Kyrie und Gloria für den Gründonnerstag
auch mit fug[iertem] Kyr[ie] und Glor[ia] [1]845 comp[oniert]
A.M.D.G. comp[oniert] [1]844, Anton Bruckner

In front of page 3 of the manuscript is written In coena Domini (At the Last Supper)

This Missa brevis exhibits as the previous Kronstorfer Messe relationships to Palestrina's style. It contained originally no Kyrie or Gloria, but included the Gradual Christus factus est and the Offertory Dextera Domini proper for the feast. Only the first part of the Credo is composed, until "descendit de caelis". The Sanctus is a slightly modified version of the Sanctus of the Kronstorfer Messe.

As also in the following Missa solemnis, Mass No. 1 and Mass No. 2 the first verse of the Credo is not composed and has to be intoned by the priest in Gregorian mode before the choir proceeds.

The extra fugated Kyrie and Gloria, which were composed in 1845, have been lost.

=== Text ===
The text of Dextera Domini is derived from Psalm 117 in the Vulgata (Psalms 118:16–17).

Dextera Domini fecit virtutem,
Dextera Domini exaltavit me.
Non moriar, sed vivam, et narrabo opera Domini.

The right hand of the Lord hath wrought strength;
The right hand of the Lord has exalted me.
I shall not die, but live, and declare the works of the Lord.

== Use in the modern liturgy ==
To make the Messe für den Gründonnerstag usable for Eucharist celebration

- Joseph Messner created in 1941 a Kyrie and a Gloria and completed the Credo, by using elements of the other parts of the Mass, and added an organ accompaniment ad libitum.
- Michael Stenov composed in 2018 a Kyrie and a Gloria, and completed the Credo fragment in Bruckner style. This completion was premiered in the Carmelite church of Linz during the Palm Sunday and Maundy Thursday celebrations.

== Discography ==
=== Original setting ===
There is a single recording of the entire original setting of the Mass:

- Rupert Gottfried Frieberger, Vokalensemble der Stiftsmusik Schlägl, Anton Bruckner – Kirchenmusikalische Werke – Fabian Records CD 5115, c. 2005

=== Messner's arrangement ===
- Joseph Pančik, Prager Kammerchor, Josef Kšica (organ), Anton Bruckner – Motetten / Choral-Messe – CD Orfeo C 327 951 A, 1993
- Ludo Claesen, Sint Maartenkoor Hasselt, Paul Steegmans (organ) – CD: Aurophon 31 4 81, end of 1990s (without Credo)

== Sources ==
- August Göllerich, Anton Bruckner. Ein Lebens- und Schaffens-Bild, c. 1922 – posthumous edited by Max Auer by G. Bosse, Regensburg, 1932
- Anton Bruckner – Sämtliche Werke, Band XXI: Kleine Kirchenmusikwerke, Musikwissenschaftlicher Verlag der Internationalen Bruckner-Gesellschaft, Hans Bauernfeind and Leopold Nowak (Editor), Vienna, 1984/2001
- Max Auer, Anton Bruckner. Sein Leben und Werk. Amalthea-Verlag, Vienna, c. 1950
- Robert Haas, Anton Bruckner, 2nd print (Reprint der Ausgabe Athenaion, Potsdam, 1934), Laaber Verlag, Regensburg, 1980. ISBN 3-9215-1841-5
- Uwe Harten, Anton Bruckner. Ein Handbuch. Residenz Verlag, Salzburg, 1996. ISBN 3-7017-1030-9.
- James Garrat, Palestrina and the German Romantic Imagination, Cambridge University Press, Cambridge, 2004. ISBN 0-521-80737-9
- John Williamson, The Cambridge Companion to Bruckner, Cambridge University Press, Cambridge, 2004. ISBN 0-521-80404-3
- Cornelis van Zwol, Anton Bruckner – Leven en Werken, Uit. Thot, Bussum, NL, 2012. ISBN 978-90-6868-590-9
