= Psalm 112 (Bruckner) =

- by Anton Bruckner
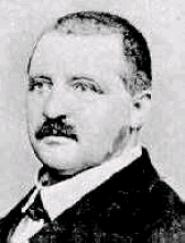
- The composer, c. 1860
- Key: B-flat major
- Catalogue: WAB 35
- Form: Psalm setting
- Composed: 1863: Linz
- Performed: Presumably 14 March 1926: Vöcklabruck
- Published: 1926
- Recorded: c. 1950 by Henry Swoboda
- Movements: 4
- Vocal: SSAATTBB choir
- Instrumental: Orchestra

Bruckner's Psalm 112, WAB 35, is a psalm setting for eight-part double mixed choir and full orchestra. It is a setting of a German version of Psalm 113, which is Psalm 112 in the Vulgata.

== History ==
Bruckner composed it in 1863 in Linz, after he had ended his studies under Sechter and Kitzler. In the same year he also composed his Study Symphony in F minor. "His next large choral work after this Psalm was to be the powerful Mass in D minor of the following year, the first of the three great masses."

The original manuscript is stored in the archive of the Österreichische Nationalbibliothek. In the manuscript, the recapitulation of the first part stops after the first five bars. It is unknown whether the work was performed during Bruckner's life. It has been first edited by Wöss in 1926. Presumably, it was performed at first on 14 March 1926 in Vöcklabruck by Max Auer.

The work has been critically re-edited by Paul Hawkshaw in 1996 in Band XX/5 of the Gesamtausgabe.

== Text ==
Den Demüthigen gibt Gott Gnade (God gives grace to the humble)

1. Alleluja! Lobet den Herrn, ihr Diener, lobet den Namen des Herrn!
2. Der Name des Herrn sey gebenedeit, von nun an bis in Ewigkeit!
3. Vom Aufgang der Sonne bis zum Untergange sey gelobet der Name des Herrn!
4. Hoch über alle Völker ist der Herr, und über die Himmel seine Herrlichkeit.
5. Wer ist wie der Herr, unser Gott? der in der Höhe wohnet,
6. Der auf das Niedrige schauet im Himmel und auf Erden,
7. Der den Geringen aufrichtet aus dem Staube, und aus dem Kothe erhöhet den Armen:
8. Daß er ihn setze neben die Fürsten, neben die Fürsten seines Volkes:
9. Der die Unfruchtbare wohnen läßt im Hause, als fröhliche Mutter von Kindern.

== Setting ==
Bruckner's Psalm 112 in B-flat major is a composition scored for SSAATTBB choir and orchestra (2 flutes, 2 oboes, 2 clarinets, 2 bassoons, 2 horns, 2 trumpets, 3 trombones, timpani and strings). The setting of the work is in four parts:

1. "Alleluja! Lobet den Herrn" - Bars 1-70
2. "Wer ist wie der Herr, unser Gott?" - Bars 71-142
3. Partial recapitulation (first two verses) followed by a fugue on "Alleluja" - Bars 143-202
4. Full-scale recapitulation of the first part

Psalm 112 with its clear repeat structure is a product of Kitzler's tutelage.

There is some rich and sonorous writing, and … the whole thing has an enthusiastic punch and an already mature skill in execution. ... [However,] the full-scale recapitulation [of the first part] creates some stiffness rather than satisfying symmetry.

== Discography ==
The first recording (c. 1950) was by Henry Swoboda with the Wiener Akademie Kammerchor and the Wiener Symphoniker, LP: Westminster WAL 201 (with Symphony No. 6 and Psalm 150). Swoboda's historical performances of Psalms 112 & 150 and Richard Strauss' Wanderers Sturmlied have been recently transferred to CD by Klassichaus Recordings: GSC052, 2015.

- Matthew Best, Bruckner - Requiem, Psalms 112 & 114, Corydon Singers, English Chamber Orchestra, Hyperion CDA66245, 1987
- Karl Anton Rickenbacher, Bruckner - Missa Solemnis, Psalm 112 & Psalm 150, Chor und Orchester der Bamberger Symphoniker, Virgin Classics VC 7 91481, 1990
- Wolfgang Sawallisch, Choir and orchestra of the Bavarian radio, 1992 live, in: Anton Bruckner - Geistliche Chorwerke - CD: Luna LU-1023
- Rolf Beuchert, Choir and orchestra of ASG and JKG Leonberg, Francis Poulenc, Anton Bruckner & Antonín Dvórak, 2000 live - CD: ASG-JKG 00719-00

== Sources ==
- Max Auer, Anton Bruckner als Kirchenmusiker, Gustav Bosse Verlag, Regensburg, 1927 - pp. 201–214
- Cornelis van Zwol, Anton Bruckner - Leven en Werken, Thot, Bussum (Netherlands), 2012 - ISBN 90-686-8590-2
- John Williamson, The Cambridge Companion to Bruckner, Cambridge University Press, 2004 - ISBN 0-521-80404-3
- Uwe Harten, Anton Bruckner. Ein Handbuch. Residenz Verlag, Salzburg, 1996. ISBN 3-7017-1030-9.
- Anton Bruckner – Sämtliche Werke, Band XX/5: Psalm 112 (1863), Musikwissenschaftlicher Verlag der Internationalen Bruckner-Gesellschaft, Paul Hawkshaw (Editor), Vienna, 1996
