= Tobias Michael =

German composer (1592–1657)

Tobias Michael (13 June 1592 in Dresden – 26 June 1657 in Leipzig) was a German composer and cantor of the Thomasschule in Leipzig from 1631 until his death. He updated Johann Hermann Schein's Cantional in 1645. He was son of the Flemish Rogier Michael (1552–1619).

== Works, editions and recordings ==
Little of his music has been preserved.

- Ich bin gewiss, dass Weder Tod noch Leben on Geistliche Werke von Thomaskantoren Thomanerchor Leipzig, dir. Hans-Joachim Rotzsch Capriccio 1989
- settings of Psalm 116 in Angst der Hellen und Friede der Seelen by Tobias and his father
