= Winfried Toll =

- Born: 1955 (age 70–71); Dorsten, Germany
- Occupations: Conductor; Singer; Composer; Academic teacher

Academic background
- Education: University of Münster; University of Freiburg; Hochschule für Musik Freiburg

Academic work
- Discipline: Music
- Institutions: Frankfurt University of Music and Performing Arts

Winfried Toll (born 1955) is a German conductor, singer, composer and academic teacher.

== Career ==
Born in Dorsten, Toll first studied theologie and philosophy at University of Münster and the University of Freiburg. He then studied composition, music theory and music pedagogy with Klaus Huber and Brian Ferneyhough at the Musikhochschule Freiburg. He took master classes in singing with Elisabeth Schwarzkopf, and in conducting with Helmuth Rilling.

From 1988, Toll has been conductor of the Camerata Vocale Freiburg, from 1994 to 2002 director of the choir Bach-Verein Köln, and from 1997 he has been the artistic director of the Frankfurter Kantorei. The same year he was appointed professor of the Hochschule für Musik und Darstellende Kunst Frankfurt am Main.
