= Rogier Michael =

Franco-Flemish composer and singer

Rogier Michael von Bergen (ca. 1553 probably in Bergen-op-Zoom – after middle 1623 in Dresden) was a Franco-Flemish composer, singer and Kapellmeister of the late Renaissance.

== Life and work ==
=== Early life ===
Michael came to Vienna as a child with his father Simon Michael († after 1566); his father was "probably the best mechanic and musician" during the reign of Emperor Ferdinand I (1556-1564) and was listed as a singer in the list of court chapels under Emperor Maximilian II from 1564 to 1566. Rogier presumably spent time as a choirboy in Vienna and in 1564 he joined the court chapel of Archduke Charles II in Graz as a choirboy.

Johannes de Cleve then Annibale Padovano were in charge of this chapel, with Padovano advising Rogier to go to Venice to study further under Andrea Gabrieli, which he did from 1569 to 1572. After his return to Germany, he took a position as a tenor singer in Ansbach at the court chapel of George Frederick, Margrave of Brandenburg-Ansbach in 1572, where he remained until 1574.

=== Dresden ===
On the recommendation of Emilie of Saxony, the sister of Elector August of Saxony, Michael became a singer and musician at the Dresden court orchestra on 1 February 1575. The Elector listened to him himself, and the old Kapellmeister Antonio Scandello also tested Michael's skills. The composer married in Dresden in 1578, and in the following years they had seven sons Rogier, Tobias, Simon, Samuel, Christian, Georg and Daniel. Samuel Michael, Daniel and Christian all studied under their father and four of the sons later became composers, particularly Tobias, who was kantor at the Thomaskirche in Leipzig from 1631 to 1657. In the 1580 list of "Cantorey" he is listed as a contralto with an annual salary of 144 gulden. He was also able to sing countertenor, and his voice was described by Friedrich Beurhaus in his writing Erotematum musicae (1591) as quite high and very noble.

Michael became court bandmaster of the Elector of Saxony under the regency of Christian I, Elector of Saxony on 12 December 1587 (a role previously held by Antonio Scandello, Giovanni Battista Pinello di Ghirardi (1544-1587) and Georg Forster). His sons Tobias, Simon and Samuel also became choir boys in Dresden. From 1599 to 1603 Michael's pupils were the later Leipzig Thomaskantor Johann Hermann Schein. His other pupils included the Freiberger Superintendent Abraham Gensreff. In 1611 Michael married his second wife Sarah Petermann, the daughter of the Dresden Kapellknabeninspektor Andreas Petermann.

=== Later life ===
When John Georg I of Saxony succeeded to the Electorate in 1611, most of the court orchestra was dismissed before it was then reconstructed without Michael's input. When Elector Johann Georg travelled to Frankfurt with his entourage in 1612 for the election and coronation of Emperor Matthias, Rogier's name was not on the list of fellow travellers.

This was because Michael had been largely relieved of his position as Kapellmeister from 1612 onwards, with a full annual salary of 300 gulden. His immediate successors were Michael Praetorius (1613 and 1614/15), and in 1615 Heinrich Schütz, though Rogier continued to be active at the Saxon court. His salary was temporarily supplemented by funds to support the choir boys who lived with him. There is also evidence of the quarterly payment of 75 gulden on Trinity Sunday 1621.

When Sarah, the composer's second wife, died and was buried in January 1623, the sermon did not mention Michael's death, and the author Burckhard Grossmann mentioned him as being alive in the preface to his publication "Angst der Hellen" (Fear of the Light Ones), published in 1623. In March 1624, however, he was no longer listed as a member of the chapel. From this the music-historical researchers conclude that the composer died after mid-1623.

== Works ==
Despite his many years of activity as a musician at the Dresden court (1575-1612), his complete musical oeuvre is not very extensive. In contrast to his predecessors Scandello and Pinello, known as composers, he cultivated the polyphonic stile antico in sacred music as well as the new Italian madrigal style, which was articulated in short quarter and eighth notes. This style was then largely adopted by his students.

The 53 hymns in the second part of the Dresden hymn book of 1593 are based on simple, homophonies wisely written. In Michael's Introit of 1603, only the antiphon is in five voices on motet tables. The antiphon is set to music in a wise manner, while the accompanying psalm texts appear in four parts in the simple Fauxbourdon movement, after which the antiphon is repeated.

In his two surviving narrative compositions for Immaculate Conception and Christmas, Michael consciously built upon Scandello's St John Passion and Resurrection Story. Michael also composed two passions of his own based on Matthew's Gospel and possibly Luke's Gospel, but both are now lost. In these narrative works, characters' words are set as solos or polyphony depending on their importance, whilst the frame and other inner movements are set polyphonically. In this way, Michael's narrative compositions form an important link between the narrative works of Scandello and of Heinrich Schütz. In an inventory of the Dresden Court Church from 1666, a "Handbuchlein von der Begnis, gebuhrt, Leiden und Auferstehung Jesu Christi in schwarzes Leder gebunden" is listed, which could have served Scandello, Michael and Schütz could all have used as a model for their works' libretti.

== Work ==
- Sacred works
  - Der Gebreuchlichsten und vornembsten Gesenge D. Mart. Luth., Dresden 1593
  - Visita quaesumus Domine for eight voices, 1596
  - Te Deum: Herr Gott, dich loben wir for six voices, 1595
  - 2 Passionen, before 1601, lost
  - teutsche Mess, before 1601, lost
  - Die Empfängnis and Die Geburt unsers Herren Jesu Christi from one to six voices, 1602
  - Hochzeitsmusik Drey schöne Stück for six voices, Dresden 1602
  - Introitus dominicorum dierum ac praecipuorum festorum for five voices, Leipzig 1603
  - Hochzeitsgesang Purpureum ver flores protulit for twelve voices, 1604
  - Hochzeitsgesang Freue dich des Weibes deiner Jugend for eight voices, Leipzig 1604
  - Hochzeitsmusik Illustri Rutae nobile ramum for eight voices, Leipzig 1607
  - Ich freue mich des, das mir geredt ist fot six voices (without year)
  - Speculum voluntatis Dei for six voices (without year)
  - Hochzeitsgesang zu sechs Stimmen, Dresden 1611, lost
  - Psalm 116 Das ist mir lieb for five voices, in Burckhard Grossmann's Angst der Hellen, Jena 1623
- Secular works
  - Fiamma d’amor for five voices in the anthology Di Alessandro Orologio il secondo libro de madrigali, Dresden 1589
  - Qualis uvidulis brasilica jugera, Gratulationsgedicht an Johann Georg I. zur Taufe des Kurprinzen Johann Georg II., Dresden 1613
