= Wiener Singakademie =

Choir in Vienna, Austria

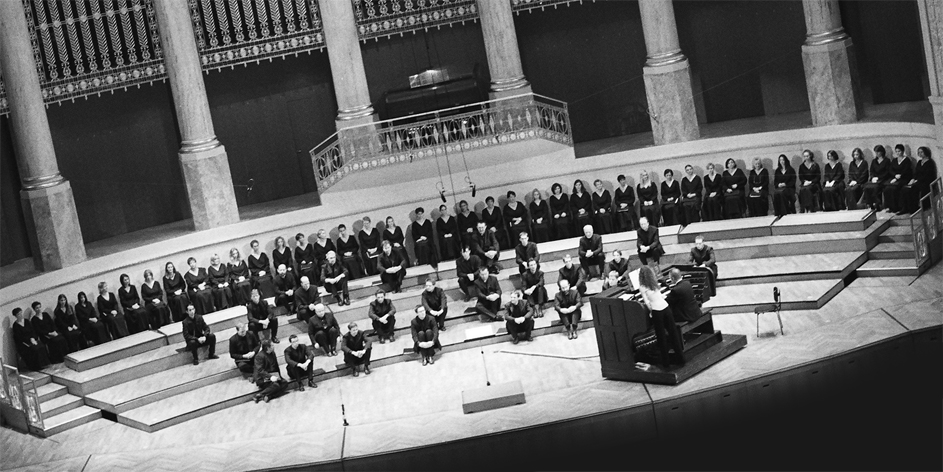
The Wiener Singakademie on the stage of Wiener Konzerthaus

The Wiener Singakademie is a choir in Vienna, Austria.

== History ==
As the first mixed choir in Vienna, the Wiener Singakademie was founded in 1858 to establish a "Singübungsanstalt" - an institution for the training of voices. It aims to promote the works of the traditional masters, and include contemporary works. In 1862, the young Johannes Brahms was invited to come to Vienna as the choir's director.

Conductors with whom the choir primarily worked included Gustav Mahler, Richard Strauss and Bruno Walter, the latter becoming the choir's director for a number of years. Composers who conducted premiere performances of their works with the Wiener Singakademie have included Edvard Grieg, Anton Rubinstein and Pietro Mascagni.

After 55 years as an independent choir, the Wiener Singakademie moved in 1913 to the newly opened Wiener Konzerthaus as part of the Wiener Konzerthausgesellschaft. In the 1950s and 1960s the choir was led by Hans Gillesberger. Wilhelm Furtwängler and Paul Hindemith, Karl Böhm and Hans Svarowsky, along with the young Lorin Maazel were jointly responsible for the choir's development at that time.

In 1983, Agnes Grossmann assumed the post of artistic director, as the first woman to head the Wiener Singakademie.

Alexander Pereira was Secretary General of the Wiener Konzerthausgesellschaft from the mid-1980s to the early 1990s, later succeeded by Herbert Böck. It has worked with artists including Georges Prêtre, Yehudi Menuhin, Claudio Abbado, Sir Roger Norrington, Sir John Eliot Gardiner, Sir Simon Rattle and Kent Nagano.

Since the beginning of the 1998–99 season, Heinz Ferlesch has led the choir, which features the routine training of singers, and integrates young soloists and ensembles into concert performances. The repertory of the choir has included performances of J.S. Bach's Johannespassion under Ton Koopman, Benjamin Britten's War Requiem under Simone Young, Verdi's Messa da Requiem under Franz Welser-Möst, and Scelsi's Konx-Om-Pax under Ingo Metzmacher. Heinz Ferlesch has led the choir in a cappella literature and baroque works for choir and orchestra. The fall 2006 performance of Händel's Judas Maccabaeus was recorded and produced as a CD in cooperation with the ORF (the Austrian Broadcasting Company). Currently, the Wiener Singakademie includes about 100 male and female singers.

In 2006 the Wiener Singakademie founded the Wiener Singakademie Kammerchor (chamber choir). The ensemble, made up of members of the Wiener Singakademie, primarily performs cappella music, as well as vocal works requiring a smaller ensemble. In July 2007 the Wiener Singakademie Kammerchor was awarded a second and a fourth place prize at the international choir competition at Spittal/Drau. For the jubilee season of 2008 Christian Mühlbacher was commissioned to compose a piece for the Ensemble.

On 8 March 2008, for the choir's 150th anniversary at the Wiener Konzerthaus, J.S. Bach's Matthäuspassion was performed at a jubilee concert in the Großer Saal of the Konzerthaus. Also in 2008, a soccer match was held against the Wiener Singverein, which was also celebrating its 150th anniversary that year.
