= RIAS Kammerchor =

German choir

- Choir
- Origin: Berlin, Germany
- Founded: 1948
- Genre: Professional mixed chamber choir
- Chief conductor: Justin Doyle
- Website: www.rias-kammerchor.de

The RIAS Kammerchor (RIAS Chamber Choir) is a German choir based in Berlin, Germany. It receives support from the Rundfunk Orchester und Chöre GmbH Berlin ("Berlin Radio Orchestra and Choirs"), a limited-liability company owned by the public broadcasters Deutschlandradio (40%) and RBB (5%), the German Federal Republic (35%), and the State of Berlin (20%).

== History ==
Founded in 1948, the choir was originally known as the Rundfunkchor des RIAS, after the US-run German-language radio station Rundfunk im amerikanischen Sektor ("Broadcasting in the American Sector"), or RIAS. Early in its history, between 1948 and 1952, the choir recorded works by Bach with Karl Ristenpart, 68 cantatas, the Christmas Oratorio, and the St John Passion. The choir first performed on 15 October 1948, and its first chief conductor was Herbert Froitzheim. Whilst founded as a regional radio station choir, the RIAS Kammerchor quickly established for itself a national and international reputation. Among its founders' aims was the promotion of contemporary musical composition, and besides performing the standard repertoire, the choir has premiered many works by contemporary composers, including a number specifically dedicated to the RIAS Kammerchor. The choir participated in the opening concert of the Berliner Philharmonie. The choir has premiered works by such contemporary composers as Paul Hindemith, Boris Blacher, Mauricio Kagel, Ernst Krenek, Pierre Boulez, Hans Werner Henze, and Aribert Reimann, works written for the RIAS Kammerchor.

During the tenure of Daniel Reuss (2003-2006), the choir's repertoire was extended to include early and Baroque music, in collaboration with such conductors as Philippe Herreweghe, René Jacobs, Nikolaus Harnoncourt, Frans Brüggen, and John Eliot Gardiner. The most recent chief conductor of the choir was Hans-Christoph Rademann, from 2007 to 2015. In April 2016, the choir announced the appointment of Justin Doyle as its next chief conductor and music director, effective with the 2017-2018 season. Doyle is currently contracted to the choir through July 2027. The current administrative director (Chordirektor) of the choir is Bernhard Hess (Heß), currently contracted through July 2026.

The choir has made commercial recordings for such labels as Deutsche Grammophon, harmonia mundi, both on its own and in works that feature orchestra and chorus.

== Chief conductors ==
- Herbert Froitzheim (1948–1954)
- Günther Arndt (1954–1972)
- Uwe Gronostay (1972–1986)
- Marcus Creed (1987–2003)
- Daniel Reuss (2003–2006)
- Hans-Christoph Rademann (2007–2015)
- Justin Doyle (2017–present)
