= Benjamin-Gunnar Cohrs =

German conductor, scholar and publicist on music (1965–2023)

Benjamin-Gunnar Cohrs (21 September 1965 – 21 November 2023) was a German conductor, music scholar (specialising in Bruckner), and publicist on music.

== Early career ==
Benjamin-Gunnar Cohrs made his early conducting debut in 1984 with the orchestra of the Youth Music School in Hameln, where he received his early musical education in 1972 (Flute, Theory, Aural Training, Piano). In the same year, he founded the Youth String Orchestra of Hameln, which performed with him numerous works of the string- and chamber orchestra repertoire until 1992. From 1986 to 1989 he studied conducting privately with the noted Italian composer and conductor Nicola Samale (Rome), and from 1989 to 1994 concert conducting (Hans-Joachim Kauffmann), voice (Hidenori Komatsu) and flute (Susanne Meier) at the Conservatory of Arts, Bremen. He also attended to rehearsals and projects of numerous well-known conductors and performed himself with several choirs and orchestras. His concert examination in 1994 included compositions by Felix Mendelssohn Bartholdy, Jean Sibelius and Frank Martin as well as the first Bremen performance of Ralph Vaughan Williams’ Symphony No. 5, recorded and broadcast by Radio Bremen. In 1996 he finished a Postgraduate Diploma in Musicology at the University of Adelaide for which he was granted a full scholarship of the DAAD (Deutscher Akademischer Austauschdienst). Since then, he had developed a career as a freelance concert conductor, editor, scholar and publicist on music. Cohrs finished his PhD in Musicology (University of Hamburg) in 2009.

== Conductor ==
Ben Cohrs made his international conducting debut in November 2000 in the Moscow Bolshoi Hall, when he introduced historically informed performing practice to the Russian National Orchestra. In March 2001 he participated in the farewell concert of the famous Philharmonia Hungarica, which was closed by the German Government and the Orchestral Union for political reasons. He appeared with orchestras such as the Royal Flanders Philharmonic (September 2001, Sumida Triphony Hall, Tokyo), Sarajevo Symphony Orchestra, and the Janacek Philharmonic; with the latter he gave the Austrian premiere of Bruckner’s completed Ninth Symphony in Gmunden. In September 2013 he conducted the first performance of his new completion of Wolfgang Amadeus Mozart´s Requiem in D minor in Germany (Bremen and Dortmund).

== Scholar and publicist on music ==
From 1996, Cohrs had contributed to international music magazines, presented pre-concert-talks as well as his own radio programmes (Radio Bremen, SWR, WDR, ORF), wrote programme notes, booklet notes, reports on musicological conferences and was a successful editor of music. From 1995 to 2012 he was a co-editor of the Bruckner-Gesamtausgabe (Bruckner complete edition, Vienna). He was a well-known Bruckner-scholar, in particular due to his studies and editions of Bruckner's Ninth Symphony. He was also a member of the editorial team of Nicola Samale which prepared the Completed Performing Version of the unfinished Finale of Bruckner's Ninth (1986–2012). He resigned from the team in 2021 after John A. Phillips had published his own revision without Cohrs' participation. For the Magazine Musik-Konzepte he compiled Vol. 120/121/122 on request of the earlier editors, Heinz-Klaus Metzger and Rainer Riehn (Bruckners Neunte im Fegefeuer der Rezeption, Munich 2003). He also edited new completed performing versions of Schubert’s Unfinished Symphony in b-minor, the Great Mass in C minor and the Requiem by Mozart, both based on original sources. Since 2012 he was Editor in Chief of the Anton Bruckner Edition Wien (Alexander Hermann publishing group, Vienna; distributed by Schott Music), in which all collected works by Anton Bruckner will appear in new, modern Urtext editions. As the first volume of the Anton Bruckner Urtext Gesamtausgabe (Patron: Nikolaus Harnoncourt - until his death -; from 2019: Simon Rattle), the Symphony No. 7 in E major appeared in Summer 2015 (First Performance: 2 May 2015, Milano/La Scala; 3 May 2015, Vienna/Musikverein; Berliner Philharmoniker, Simon Rattle). In 2016 the Symphony No. 6 in A major followed (First Performance: April 2016 in Paris, London, Brussels, Orchestra of the Age of Enlightenment, Simon Rattle), 2017 the Missa Solemnis in B flat (First Performance: 25 June 2017, Berlin/Konzerthaus, RIAS-Kammerchor, Akademie für Alte Musik Berlin, Lukasz Borowicz), 2018 the Symphony No. 5 in B-flat major (First Performance: Swedish Radio Symphony Orchestra, Daniel Harding, Stockholm/Berwaldhallen, 4 September 2018), 2018 the Requiem d minor (First Performance: 22 November 2018, Berlin/Philharmonie, RIAS-Kammerchor, Akademie für Alte Musik Berlin, Lukasz Borowicz), and 2021 the Symphony No. 4 in E-flat major (Version 1878–81, including - as appendices - the earlier Scherzo and Finale discarded in 1878; First Performance: 19 to 27 September 2021 in London, Luxembourg, Frankfurt, Dortmund and Cologne, London Symphony Orchestra, Simon Rattle).

Cohrs died from a heart attack on 21 November 2023, at the age of 58.

=== Editions of music ===
- Lili Boulanger: Théme et Variations for Piano(1915). First Edition. Tonger, Cologne, 2005 (ISMN-M-005-32611-3)
- Anton Bruckner: Symphony No. IX in d-minor (score and parts) New critical edition, Bruckner Complete Edition, Vienna 2000 (ISMN-M-50025-225-2)
- Anton Bruckner: Symphony No. IX, Finale (unfinished). Completed Performance Version (1986–92/rev. 1996); (with Nicola Samale, John A. Phillips, Giuseppe Mazzuca); Adelaide/Bremen 1992. Revised Edition (with Nicola Samale): 2005/rev. 2008/rev. 2012; Score : Repertoire Explorer Nr. 444 / Musikproduktion Hoeflich, Munich, 2012; Orchestral Parts: BGC Manuscript Edition, Bremen.
- Anton Bruckner: Scherzo und Trio / Ältere Trios mit Viola-Solo. Bruckner Complete Edition, Vienna 1998 (ISMN-M-50025-182-8)
- Anton Bruckner: Symphony No. IX, Two earlier, discarded Trios. Performance Version Doblinger, Vienna, 1998 (ISMN-M-012-18480-8).
- Frank Martin: Sonata da Chiesa for Flute and String Orchestra (1993–94; new arrangement on request of Maria Martin); First Edition, Universal-Edition, Vienna 1997 (UE 30 868).
- Wolfgang Amadeus Mozart: Great Mass in C minor, Credo & Agnus Dei, Completion from original sources. Score: Repertoire Explorer Nr. 1049, Musikproduktion Höflich, Munich, 2010; Performance Material: BGC Manuscript Edition, Bremen
- Wolfgang Amadeus Mozart: Requiem in D minor, new Completion. Score: Repertoire Explorer Nr. 1425, Musikproduktion Höflich, Munich, 2013; Performance Material: BGC Manuscript Edition, Bremen
- Erik Satie: Trois Gymnopédies, Arrangement for String Orchestra with Harp ad lib.; Score and Parts; First Edition, Doblinger, Vienna 2006 (ISMN-M-012-19299-2)
- Franz Schubert: Symphony in b minor D 759 (Unfinished), Scherzo D 759/3 (Completed Performance Edition by Nicola Samale & Benjamin-Gunnar Cohrs) / Orchestral Movement D 797/1 (Presumed Finale); Score: Repertoire Explorer Nr. 884 / Musikproduktion Hoeflich, Munich, 2008; Orchestral Parts: BGC Manuscript Edition, Bremen.

=== Selected writings in print ===
- Das Finale der IX. Sinfonie von Anton Bruckner. Geschichte - Dokumente - Werk - Präsentation des Fragments. (Dissertation) Wiener Bruckner Studien 3, Vienna 2012, ISBN 978-3-900270-94-0
- Bruckners Neunte im Fegefeuer der Rezeption. Musik-Konzepte 120/121/122, Munich 2003, ISBN 3-88377-738-2
- Anton Bruckner: IX. Symphonie d-moll (1. Satz–Scherzo & Trio–Adagio). Critical Report, Bruckner Complete Edition, Vienna 2001, ISBN 3-900270-53-8

=== Selected original compositions ===
- L´amour perdu (MS, 1993), Berceuse for piano op. 4 (dedicated to Ole Georg Graf). Also arranged for small orchestra (MS, 1999)
- Trois Pastorales (MS,1991) op. 3 for flute and clarinet (dedicated to Michael Donner)
- Jesu, Deine Passion EKG 67 (MS, 1987/91). Chorale prelude for organ op. 2 (in memoriam Sebastian Hedemann)
- Komm, Herr, segne uns (MS, 1980/4) op. 1, motet for mixed choir, flute and organ (dedicated to Daniela Scholz)
