= Philharmonia Hungarica =

German symphony orchestra

The Philharmonia Hungarica was a symphony orchestra, based in Marl, Germany, which existed from 1956 to 2001.

== History ==
The Philharmonia Hungarica was first established in Baden bei Wien near Vienna by Hungarian musicians who had fled their homeland after it was invaded by Soviet troops. This refugee ensemble gathered together some of Hungary's finest musical talent and was directed by Zoltán Rozsnyai, former conductor of the Hungarian National Philharmonic. After two years it moved to Marl with funding from the North Rhine-Westphalia government. Through the efforts of Rozsnyai and honorary president Antal Doráti, the Philharmonia Hungarica quickly matured into one of Europe's most distinguished orchestras.

Soon after its foundation Doráti recorded two Bartók LPs, Respighi, two Haydn symphonies, Tchaikovsky and Arensky on the Mercury label. An abridged Orphée aux Enfers (in German) with Adolf Dallapozza and Anneliese Rothenberger, conducted by Willy Mattes, and a Wiener Blut with Rothenberger, Nicolai Gedda and Renate Holm conducted by Willi Boskovsky were also set down. During the 1970s, Doráti and the orchestra, under contract with Decca Records, made a recording of the complete Joseph Haydn symphonies; only two other ensembles, the Austro-Hungarian Haydn Orchestra, conducted by Ádám Fischer, and the Stuttgart Chamber Orchestra, conducted by Dennis Russell Davies have since repeated this feat. Doráti's recording was widely reported as the first, although Ernst Märzendorfer had earlier recorded the complete Haydn symphonies with the Vienna Chamber Orchestra, although it was given a very limited release. Again using the St. Bonifatius Kirche as the recording venue, Doráti and the orchestra also recorded Kodály's orchestral music in 1973.

The orchestra made several concert tours, within Europe and in North America and appearing at music festivals. Premieres given by the orchestra included Hunyadi László (1982) by von Einem for the orchestra's 25th anniversary, Clarinet Concerto (1986) by Giselher Klebe, and the Piano Concerto (1992) by Krzysztof Meyer. In 1976 the Philharmonia Hungarica recorded Jon Lord's critically acclaimed 'Sarabande' album, an original collection of movements inspired by the baroque dance suites.

From the orchestra's inception, the West German government sought to harness its anti-Soviet propaganda potential. As a result, the government generously funded the orchestra throughout the Cold War and continued subsidies after the Iron Curtain fell in 1990. The withdrawal of state subsidies at the start of 2001, combined with the long-term decline in concert attendances, aggravated the financial problems that threatened the orchestra's survival.

After Rozsnyai, the chief conductors were Miltiades Caridis (1960–67), Alois Springer (1968–74), Reinhard Peters (1975–79), Uri Segal (1979–85), Gilbert Varga (1985–91) and finally George Alexander Albrecht.

The beleaguered Philharmonia Hungarica finally disbanded after giving a farewell concert in Düsseldorf on 22 April 2001, featuring a performance of Anton Bruckner's Symphony No. 9 including the finale (Ed. Nicola Samale, John A. Phillips, Benjamin-Gunnar Cohrs and Giuseppe Mazzuca) conducted by Robert Bachmann, as well as the first German performance of the finale fragment, edited by John A. Phillips, conducted and presented by Cohrs. The concert was attended by an estimated audience of 150 in a concert hall meant to hold 2000 (Tonhalle Düsseldorf), after members of the German Orchestral Union had falsely announced in public that the concert would be cancelled. Plans to rescue the orchestra failed, because there was no political interest any longer to keep it alive.
