= Da Ponte operas =

Three Mozart operas on libretti by Lorenzo da Ponte

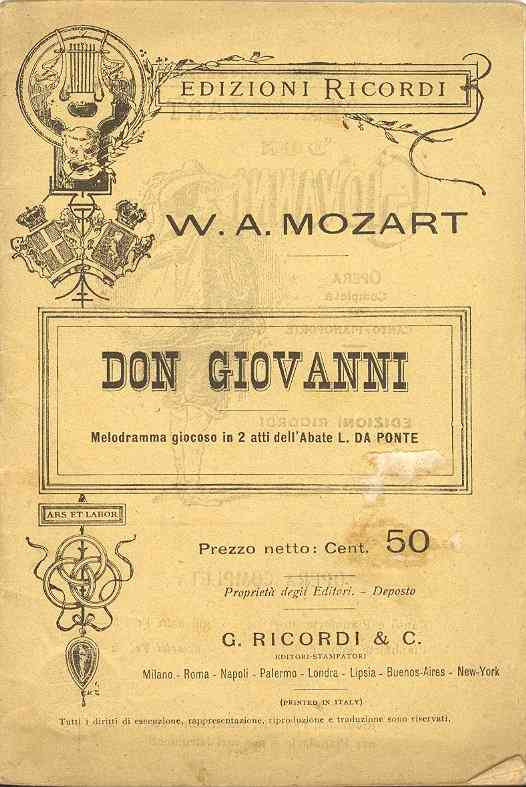
Libretto of Don Giovanni, melodrama by Da Ponte and Mozart

The Da Ponte operas, or Mozart–Da Ponte trilogy, are the three operas composed by Wolfgang Amadeus Mozart based on libretti by Lorenzo da Ponte:

- The Marriage of Figaro (1786);
- Don Giovanni (1787);
- Così fan tutte (1790).

All created for the Court Opera in Vienna, they are in Italian, the language considered most suitable for opera at the time, and are Mozart’s most popular operas apart from Die Entführung aus dem Serail and The Magic Flute, composed on German libretti in the Singspiel genre.

All three are in the genre of opera buffa, with the urgency of a story covering a single day. Despite the light and comic character implied by the genre, they express an aspiration to freedom inspired by the ideals of the Age of Enlightenment and deal with themes which were daring for their time, especially with regards to religion (Don Giovanni), politics (Marriage), and morality (Così). Other common topics include the search for love or for sexual pleasure, disguise (especially transvestism) and the ensuing mistaken identities, the harassment of women by men, and the conflicts between master and servant.

== Productions as a cycle ==
Although the three operas were designed by Mozart and Da Ponte as completely separate, some stage directors endeavoured to produce them as a single story, in order to stress the continuities and echoes between them:

- In 2015–2017, French director Ivan Alexandre produced the trilogy at the Drottningholm Palace Theatre and the Royal Opera of Versailles, with subsequent performances on tour. In his version, the lovelorn teenager Cherubino becomes the libertine Don Giovanni, who then ages as the disillusioned but scheming Don Alfonso; at the end of Così, he designates as his libertine successor Despina, sung by the same singer as Cherubino, hinting at a cyclical nature of the story. Figaro and Leporello, both servants, are performed by the same singer, as they had been by Francesco Benucci in 1786–1787. Musical quotations are added from the other operas, as Mozart himself had done when Don Giovanni’s house orchestra plays the popular tune of Figaro’s aria.
- In 2020, Jean-Philippe Clarac and Olivier Delœil produced a cycle commissioned by Peter de Caluwe at the Royal Theatre of La Monnaie, Brussels. The three works are performed in a single set, a three-level open and rotating building inspired by Georges Perec’s Life: A User's Manual, making it easier to interweave three libretti in a single twenty-four hour story. Twelve singers each played two of the twenty-five roles (for example Almaviva and Don Giovanni, the Countess and Donna Anna, or Cherubino and Dorabella), and some characters from one opera had short interventions in another, for which a few lines were redistributed to them. A colour scheme identified the elements from each opera: the blue of temperance and constancy for the Marriage, the red of blood, violence and sex for Don Giovanni, and the yellow of betrayal for Così.

== Literature ==
- Holden, Anthony (2006). The Man Who Wrote Mozart. London: Weidenfeld & Nicolson. ISBN 978-029785-080-9.
- Goertz, Harald (1985). Mozarts Dichter Lorenzo da Ponte: Genie und Abenteurer (in German). Vienna: Österreichischer Bundesverlag. ISBN 3-215-05646-1.
- Metzger, Heinz-Klaus; Riehn, Rainer, eds. (1991). Mozart: Die Da Ponte-Opern. Musik-Konzepte (Sonderband) (in German). Munich: edition text + kritik. ISBN 3-88377-397-2.
