= Bavarian State Orchestra =

Orchestra of the Bavarian State Opera

- Native name: Bayerisches Staatsorchester
- Founded: 1523
- Location: Munich, Bavaria, Germany
- Concert hall: National Theatre Munich
- Principal conductor: Vladimir Jurowski
- Website: www.staatsoper.de/en/staatsorchester

The Bavarian State Orchestra (German: Bayerisches Staatsorchester) is the orchestra of the Bavarian State Opera in Munich, Germany. It has given its own series of concerts, the Akademiekonzerte, since 1811.

== Profile ==
The origins of the ensemble date back to 1523 and the times of composer Ludwig Senfl, when sacred music was the focus of work. The musicians achieved renown across Europe, the more so after 1563 and the appointment of Belgian master polyphonist Orlande de Lassus as maestro di cappella.

In 1653, the first opera performances took place in Munich, adding to and greatly realigning the musicians' activities. In 1762 the ensemble was titled Hoforchester (orchestra to the Bavarian court), a position it already effectively held. Sixteen years later, just after Karl Theodor of Mannheim became Duke of Bavaria and shifted his court to Munich, 33 musicians of the famous Mannheim orchestra – the prototype of all modern symphony orchestras – followed their boss, injecting new levels of precision into the Hoforchester.

In 1781, Mozart conducted the musicians in the world premiere of his opera Idomeneo, written in Munich. The ensemble was formally founded in 1811 as the Music Academy of the Bavarian State Orchestra. During the 1860s the orchestra, by then an integral part of the Hofoper (Court Opera), gave the world premieres of the Wagner operas Die Meistersinger von Nürnberg, Tristan und Isolde, and Das Rheingold, followed in 1870 by Die Walküre. Hans von Bülow was active as conductor at that time. Upon the German Revolution of 1918–1919 the name changed again, to its present form, reflecting the demise of the Bavarian monarchy.

The Bavarian State Orchestra is today part of the Bavarian State Opera company, Germany's largest, which it serves as pit ensemble, based in Munich's National Theatre. Its main conductor has the title of Generalmusikdirektor (GMD) of the company. Richard Strauss, Bruno Walter, Hans Knappertsbusch, Clemens Krauss, Ferenc Fricsay, Joseph Keilberth, and Wolfgang Sawallisch have served in this position. The orchestra had a long and successful cooperation (1968–1997) with Carlos Kleiber, though he never served as GMD of the parent company or as the orchestra's chief conductor. Zubin Mehta held the post from 1998 to 2006. Kent Nagano and Kirill Petrenko followed as chief conductors. On 9 December 2011, this ensemble celebrated the 200th anniversary of its first concert as a full symphony orchestra. In 2021, Vladimir Jurowski became chief conductor. Jurowski's current contract with the orchestra is through 2028.

The orchestra is one of seven such professional bodies in the city of Munich, its neighbors being the orchestra of the Staatstheater am Gärtnerplatz, the Bavarian Radio Symphony Orchestra, the Munich Radio Orchestra (a second radio ensemble), the Munich Philharmonic (operated by the City at its Gasteig venue), the Munich Symphony Orchestra, and the smaller-scale Munich Chamber Orchestra (Münchener Kammerorchester, MKO).

== General music directors ==
- Franz Lachner (1836–1867)
- Hans von Bülow (1867–1869)
- Franz Wüllner (1870–1877)
- Hermann Levi (1872–1896)
- Richard Strauss (1894–1896)
- Hermann Zumpe (1901–1903)
- Felix Mottl (1904–1911)
- Bruno Walter (1913–1922)
- Hans Knappertsbusch (1922–1935)
- Clemens Krauss (1937–1944)
- Hans Knappertsbusch (1945)
- Georg Solti (1946–1952)
- Rudolf Kempe (1952–1954)
- Ferenc Fricsay (1956–1958)
- Joseph Keilberth (1959–1968)
- Wolfgang Sawallisch (1971–1992)
- Peter Schneider (interim, 1992–1998)
- Zubin Mehta (1998–2006)
- Kent Nagano (2006–2013)
- Kirill Petrenko (2013–2021)
- Vladimir Jurowski (2021–present)
- Petr Popelka (designated, effective from 2029)
