= Zumpe =

Zumpe is a surname. Notable people with the surname include:

- Günter Zumpe (born 1929), German university professor
- Johannes Zumpe (1726–1790), Anglo-German piano maker
- Hermann Zumpe (1850–1903), German conductor and composer
