= Symphony No. 9 (Bruckner) =

Symphony by Anton Bruckner

- by Anton Bruckner
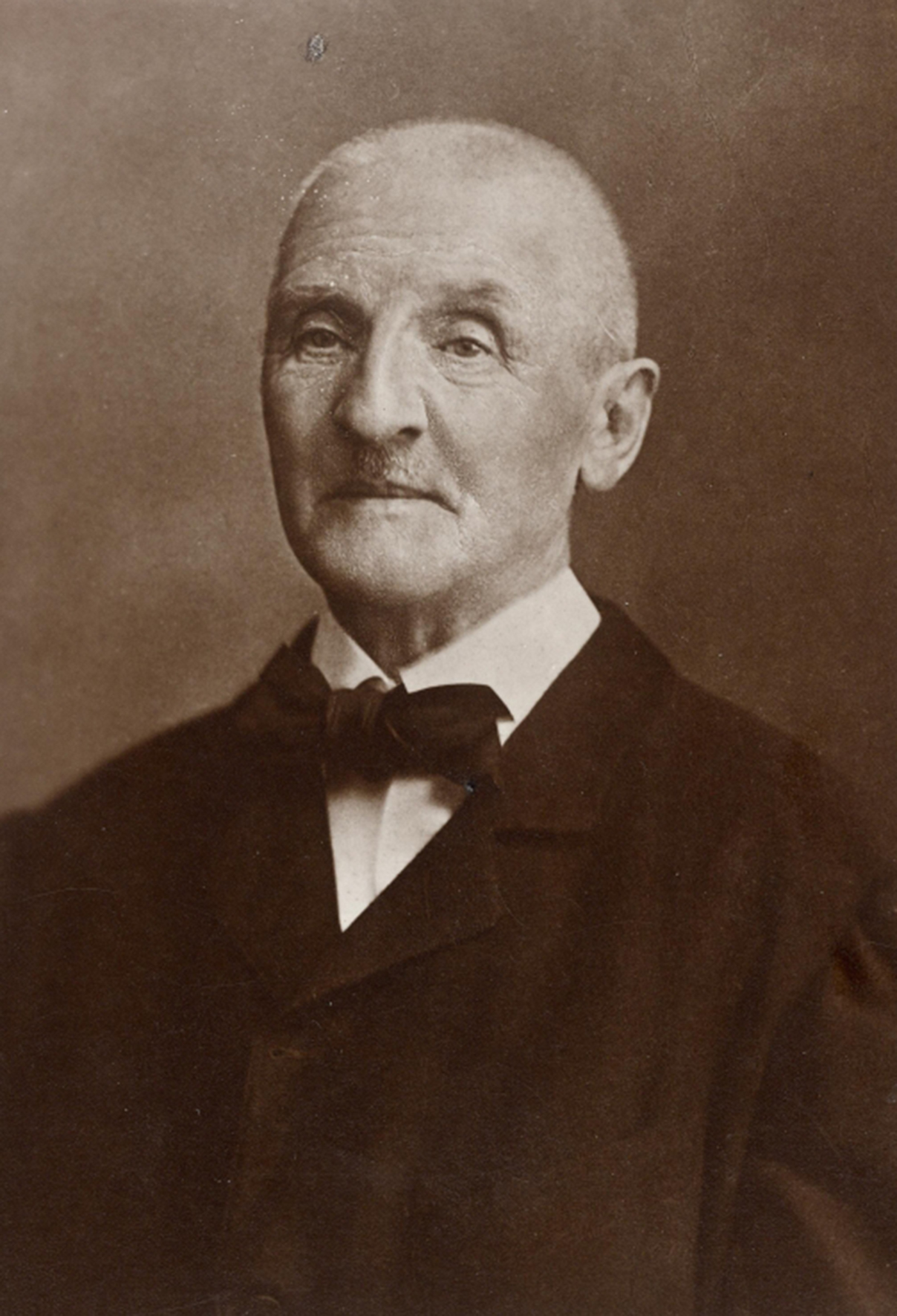
- Key: D minor
- Catalogue: WAB 109
- Composed: 1887–1896 (unfinished)
- Dedication: To "the beloved God"
- Movements: 4 started, 3 completed

The Symphony No. 9 in D minor, WAB 109, is the last symphony on which Anton Bruckner worked, leaving the last movement incomplete at the time of his death in 1896. Bruckner dedicated it "to the beloved God" (in German, dem lieben Gott). The symphony was premiered under Ferdinand Löwe in Vienna in 1903.

== Dedication ==
Bruckner is said to have dedicated his Ninth Symphony to "the beloved God". August Göllerich and Max Auer, in their biography of Bruckner, Ein Lebens- und Schaffensbild, claim he expressed to his doctor, Richard Heller, this dedication of his work saying:

You see, I have already dedicated two earthly majesty symphonies to poor King Ludwig as the royal patron of the arts [VII. Symphony, note d. Ed.] To our illustrious, dear Emperor as the highest earthly majesty, whom I acknowledge [VIII. Symphony, note d. Ed.] And now I dedicate my last work to the majesty of all the majesties, the beloved God, and hope that he will give me so much time to complete the same.

== Genesis ==
Immediately after completing the first version of his Eighth Symphony on 10 August 1887, Bruckner began work on his Ninth. First draft sketches, which are stored in the Jagiellońska Library, Kraków, are dated 12–18 August 1887. Additionally, the first score of the first movement is dated 21 September 1887.

Work on the first movement was soon interrupted. The conductor Hermann Levi, to whom Bruckner had just sent the score of his Eighth, found the orchestration impossible and the working-out of the themes "dubious", suggesting that Bruckner rework it. Bruckner set to revising it in 1888. During the revision of his Eighth, he also revised his Third Symphony from March 1888 to March 1889.

In the midst of revising his Eighth and Third, on 12 February 1889, Bruckner began to prepare his Second Symphony for publication. On 10 March 1890, he completed his Eighth before making further revisions of his First and Fourth Symphonies and his F minor Mass.

Bruckner announced in a letter dated 18 February 1891 to the reviewer Theodor Helm, "Loud secrets today. H. Doctor! [...] 3rd secret. The Ninth Symphony (D minor) has begun," concealing the fact that his first sketches of the Ninth had been written nearly four years earlier. Bruckner then composed two choral-symphonic works, a setting of the 150th Psalm (1892) and the male choral work Helgoland (1893).

On 23 December 1893, the first movement of the Ninth was completed after six years. The Scherzo (second movement), sketched as early as 1889, was completed on 15 February 1894. Bruckner composed three successive versions of the Trio:

- The first version (1889), in F major, in Ländler style with a viola solo, recalls some ideas from the Eighth Symphony. The quarter-note pizzicato accompaniment at the outset recalls the opening of the Te Deum, which was also repeated in the sketches of the Finale.
- The second version (1893), in the remote key of F♯ major, also in Ländler style with a viola solo, has a somewhat ethereal sound. The mid-part contains a reminiscence to the Hallelujah from Händel's Messiah.
- The final version (1894), also in F♯ major, is unusually fast in tempo for a trio. The slower mid-part contains, as in the previous version, a reminiscence of the Hallelujah from Händel's Messiah.

The Adagio (third movement) was completed on 30 November 1894. With regard to the final movement, the following entry can be found in Bruckner's calendar: "24. Mai [1]895 1.mal Finale neue Scitze" ("24th May 1895 first new sketch of finale"). Overall, the work on the Ninth stretched over the long period from 1887 to 1896 and had to be interrupted repeatedly due to revisions to other works and Bruckner's deteriorating health. Bruckner died during the work on the fourth movement, before completing the symphony.

The Ninth Symphony has only one version, consisting of three movements with extensive sketches of the finale. If Bruckner has lived to complete the finale, he would almost certainly have gone over the other movements and made adjustments. Thus what we have is a work in progress.

— Bruckner Red Book

== First performance ==
The first three movements of the Ninth were premiered in Vienna, in the Musikvereinssaal on 11 February 1903 by the Vienna Concertvereinsorchester, the precursor of the Vienna Symphony, under the conductor Ferdinand Löwe in his own arrangement. Löwe profoundly changed Bruckner's original score by adapting Bruckner's orchestration in the sense of a rapprochement with Wagner's ideal of sound, and made changes to Bruckner's harmony in certain passages (most notably in the climax of the Adagio). He published his altered version without comment, and this edition was long regarded as Bruckner's original. In 1931, the musicologist Robert Haas pointed out the differences between Löwe's edition and Bruckner's original manuscripts. The following year, conductor Siegmund von Hausegger performed both the Löwe-edited and the original Bruckner score, so that the actual premiere of the first three movements of Bruckner's Ninth Symphony took place on 2 April 1932 in Munich. The first recording (issued on LP in the 1950s) was made by Hausegger with the Munich Philharmonic in the original version (edited by Alfred Orel) in April 1938.

== Stylistic classification ==
Bruckner expanded the symphonic form extremely using the negative sound of silence, sequencing phases, widened peaks and decay processes. Bruckner was rooted in the music of Palestrina, Bach, Mozart, Beethoven, and Schubert and also an innovator of late 19th-century harmony (alongside Franz Liszt). Bruckner continues his symphonic path by adhering to the sonata form in the Ninth Symphony. He also expands the form, enhancing it to the monumental. This expansion of the orchestra apparatus is also an expression of this mass increase.

"If one looks at the overall apparatus that Bruckner uses, the most striking thing is the amount of sound that was hitherto unknown in absolute music... The orchestra of the IX, Bruckner's symphony is only the end point of Bruckner's aural development line with regard to the means used... The decisive factor, however, is not the mass of means of expression, but the way in which they are used... As in Strings of the group, woodwinds and brass instruments are soon to be juxtaposed, soon to be coupled again in the most diverse ways, and united to form an inseparable whole, as well as in individual sound the instruments of these groups. On the one hand the open work, on the other hand Bruckner's peculiarity to form his themes often out of short phrases, mean that an instrument seldom emerges solo for a long time without interruption."

— Anton Bruckner, Das Werk – Der Künstler – Die Zeit

According to Ekkehard Kreft, "the phases of improvement in the Ninth Symphony take on a new significance, as they serve to shape the processual [sic] character from the starting point of the thematic complex (first theme) to its final destination (main theme)." Both in the first sentence and in the final movement this is expressed in a hitherto unknown dimension. The entry of the main theme is preceded by a harmoniously complicated increase phase. The use of this increasingly complex harmony makes Bruckner the pioneer of later developments. The musicologist Albrecht von Mossow summarizes this with regard to the Ninth as follows: "To the material developments of modernity must be attributed to Bruckner as with other composers of the 19th century, the increasing emancipation of dissonance, the chromatisation of harmony, the weakening of tonality, the touch of the Triadic harmonics through the increased inclusion of four- and five-tone sounds, the formal breaks within his symphonic movements, and the revaluation of timbre to an almost independent parameter."

The Ninth Symphony has great waves of development, climax and decay, which music psychologist Ernst Kurth describes as a "contrast of sound-specific breadth and emptiness compared to the previous compression and summit position." Kurth compares this with Stockhausen's 1957 composition 'Gruppen', where structure is also shown in the dismemberment of the individual apparatus instead of the linear genesis, saying Bruckner transfers a wealth of sounds, colors, and characters, and not just spatial sound conceptions on instrumental apparatus.

The fugue is unusual because of its prominent position in the final movement of the Ninth Symphony, although the inclusion of a fugue in the symphonic context of Bruckner is not uncommon. As Rainer Bloss writes (as translated from German): "The main theme of the finale of the 9th Symphony has a peculiarity, because its form is changed, transformed in its last two bars ... Bruckner's 'unusual' two-bar extension demonstrates this modular regression exceptionally".

Bruckner increasingly refines his technique of citation in the Ninth Symphony. Paul Thissen sums it up in his analysis (translated from German): "Undoubtedly, the form of integration of quotations used by Bruckner in the Adagio of the Ninth Symphony shows the most differentiated appearance. It ranges from mere montage technique (as in Miserere) to the penetration of the sequence with transformations similar to Kyrie".

== Description ==
The symphony has four movements, although the finale is incomplete and fragmentary:

1. Feierlich, misterioso (D minor)
2. Scherzo: Bewegt, lebhaft (D minor); Trio. Schnell (F♯ major)
3. Adagio: Langsam, feierlich (E major)
4. Finale: Misterioso, nicht schnell (D minor, incomplete)

Much material for the finale in full score may have been lost very soon after the composer's death; some of the lost sections in full score survived only in two-to-four-stave sketch format. The placement of the Scherzo second, and the key, D minor, are only two of the elements this work has in common with Beethoven's Ninth Symphony.

The symphony is so often performed without any sort of finale that some authors describe "the form of this symphony [as] … a massive arch, two slow movements straddling an energetic Scherzo."

=== Scoring ===
The score calls for three flutes, three oboes, three clarinets in B♭ and A, three bassoons, three trumpets in F, three trombones, eight horns (5th to 8th doubling Wagner tubas), one contrabass tuba, timpani and strings.

==== Performing time ====
- Movements 1–3: ca. 55–65 min. (1: 535 bars, 2: 512 bars, 3: 243 bars)
- Movement 4 (completions by others):
  - William Carragan: ca. 22 minutes (717 bars)
  - Nors S. Josephson (1992): ca. 20 minutes (644 bars)
  - Sébastien Letocart (2008): ca. 24 minutes (717 / 725 bars)
  - Samale-Mazzuca-Phillips-Cohrs (1992, 2008, 2010, 2012): ca. 25 minutes (665 bars)
  - John A. Phillips (2021–2022, based on SPCM version): ca. 23 minutes (649 bars)
  - Gerd Schaller: ca. 25 minutes (736 bars)
- Free compositions incorporating material from the Finale sketches:
  - Ernst Märzendorfer (1969): ca. 25 minutes
  - P. J. Marthé (2006): ca. 30 minutes
- Replacement of the 4th movement by Bruckner's Te Deum: ca. 23 minutes

=== First movement ===
==== First and second parts ====
The first movement in D minor (alla breve) is a freely designed sonata movement with three thematic groups. At the beginning, the strings in the tremolo intone the root note D, which is solidified in the third bar by the woodwinds. A first thematic nucleus sounds in the horns as a "(fundamental) tone repetition in the triple-dotted rhythm, from which the interval of the third, then the fifth dissolves, fits into the underlying metric order structure by caesurating strokes of the timpani and trumpets. A symphony can hardly begin more primitive, elemental, archetypal." The typical phenomenon of sound splitting for Bruckner occurs in bar 19: the root note D is dissociated into its neighboring notes E♭ and D♭. A bold E♭ major upswing of the horns announces something auspicious. As a result, an extended development phase prepares the entry of the main theme. Bruckner's music is specific, and this underlies his principle of development and the exploration of sound. Bruckner's path to this theme creation is getting longer; it takes more and more time for the main idea to break out.

The powerful main theme in the first movement impresses as the D minor sound space is first confirmed by the rhythmically striking octave transposition of the notes D and A, with a sudden deviation of the sound to C♭ major, reinterpreted as a dominant to E minor. The theme follows a multiple cadence over C major and G minor to A major, and finally to D major, seeming to enter its decay phase, yet simultaneously transitioning to the lyrically cantabile side theme – the so-called singing period. This interval of falling in succession, which also plays a role in the unfinished fourth movement, forms an integral part of the lead motif of the singing period. Subsequently, Bruckner composes a pristine transitional phase, which is closely repeated between the second and third theme groups.

The second theme group shifts the music to A major and begins quietly. This section is played more slowly than the first and the violins carry the initial theme:

The third theme group returns to D minor and prominently features the horns.

At the end of the transition, there is a pause on the note F, implemented seamlessly. In terms of form, Bruckner extends his symphonic path by merging the development and the subsequent reprise, instead of separating them.

"These two parts [execution and recapitulation] have become the internal structure, by soldering the seam into a unified whole. The implementation consists of an extension of the main theme, but without changing the arrangement of the motif material in its tripartite division. Thus, the first part of the main theme experiences a repetition – not true to the original but the inner essence. The repetition, however, is combined with the motif material of the second part in the inversion as accompaniment. The second part is also extended and, as in the exposition, leads to the third part and climax with the same increase as in the exposition. [...] This climax is also extended by repeated, increasing sequencing. The sudden conclusion of the exposition is avoided; It is replaced by a short performance of the motif material of this climax with a new motive for independent accompaniment that determines the character of this passage."

— Anton Bruckner, Das Werk – Der Künstler – Die Zeit

==== Third part ====
Bruckner's tendency to telescope sonata form development and recapitulation finds its fullest realisation in this movement, the form of which Robert Simpson describes as "Statement, Counterstatement and Coda". An unusually large number of motifs are given in the first subject group, and these are substantially and richly developed on restatement and in the coda. The main theme of the movement, which is given by the full orchestra, contains an octave fall that is effectively in a quadruple-dotted rhythm (a whole note tied to triple-dotted half note).

Bruckner also cites material from his earlier works: at a point near the coda, Bruckner quotes a passage from the first movement of his Seventh Symphony. The concluding page of the movement, in addition to the usual tonic (I) and dominant (V) chords, given out in a blaze of open fifths, uses a Neapolitan flat (♭II; the rising E♭ figure from bar 19) in grinding dissonance with both I and V.

=== Second movement ===
The Scherzo in D minor (3/4) unusually begins with an empty bar. After this pause, the woodwinds intone a distinctive rhythmic dissonance chord with the sounds E, G♯, B♭ and C♯. This chord can be analyzed in several ways. The musicologist Wolfram Steineck gives the following explanation: "If undoubtedly the turn to C sharp minor can be heard, it is from the beginning also dominantly related to D minor, so at least ambiguous. [...] It is the dominant root A, which is split into its two surrounding halftones (and leading tones) and gives the sound its characteristic subdominant character, without taking away the dominant one from it." The phenomenon of tone splitting is thus significant here too. While the tone dissociation in the first movement concerns the root of the tonic and occurs relatively late, in the Scherzo the note A, located in the center of a dominant A major sixth chord, is split into its neighbor tones G♯ and B♭ at the beginning already. The frame interval of this chord is the sixth, which is thematically and structurally immanent to the Ninth Symphony. Bruckner wrote "E Fund[ament] Vorhalt auf Dom" in his sketch on 4 January 1889; thus, according to Steinbeck, the chord has also theoretically E as its root, but is a suspension on the dominant (the chord of A major) at a distance of a fifth. This characteristic chord may be however also heard as a diminished seventh chord on C♯, seventh degree of the harmonic minor scale, in first inversion and with G♯ as its raised fifth. In his overview of Bruckner's symphonies, Philip Barford described the general mood of the scherzo as "grim and tense".

Bruckner has composed three successive versions of the Trio:

- A first version of the Scherzo and Trio was already fully available on 4 January 1889. The first version of the trio in F major, with Ländler-allure and using a solo viola, recalls somewhat that of the Eighth. One notes the accompaniment in pizzicato with the motif of the Te Deum, that the composer will recall in the sketches of the Finale. Its look, key and date of composition suggest that it might have been conceived as alternative Trio for the Eighth.
- In early 1893 that Bruckner resumed his work and composed a new trio. In the second version (27 February 1893) in F♯ major, also with solo viola, the quiet Ländler tone is preserved. It looks somewhat ethereal and its central part, a reminiscence of the Hallelujah from Händel's Messiah, prefigures already that of the final version.
- The final three-part Trio (15 February 1894), also in F♯ major, and fast 3/8 bar, misleads the listener with its ambiguity and its metrically and rhythmically unexpected shifts. The repeated F♯ major triads are alienated by the lead tones F and C; overall, the Trio has a ghostly effect. While the two earlier Trio drafts of 1889 and 1893 are still more folksy in tone, the final F♯ major trio places the bizarre, the bold, and the fantastical in the foreground, which is why "not a few believe that the scherzo of the Ninth is the most ingenious thing that Bruckner ever wrote."

The discarded Trios 1 & 2 have been premiered by the Strub Quartet (1940). A recording of this performance is stored in the Deutsches Rundfunkarchiv. A symphonic version of Trios No. 1 and No. 2, in an edition by William Carragan, was performed by Hubert Soudant with the Hiversum Radio Philharmonic Orchestra and by Manfred Mayrhofer with the Bruckner Orchestra Linz. Recordings of these live performances are available in the Bruckner Archive The three versions of the Trio have been published by Cohrs. The edition by Cohrs was performed by Vasilly Sinaisky with the BBC Philharmonic Orchestra. A recording of this live performance is available in the Bruckner Archive. Mayrhofer's and Sinaisky's performances are also available on Bruckner Society CD BSVD-216. Ricardo Luna has also recorded the three successive versions of the trio in an own arrangement for chamber orchestra in 2013 and in 2022 in symphonic version with the Bolton Symphony Orchestra.

=== Third movement ===
==== First part ====
The three-part Adagio in E major (4/4) "has experienced innumerable interpretations seeking to describe its mood and will undoubtedly experience these in the future." For example, Göllerich and Auer see the beginning "in the bleak mood of the erring Parsifal (the prelude to Richard Wagner's Third Act of the Dedication Festival)". In terms of compositional analysis, the phenomenon of tone splitting plays an integral role in this movement's beginning.

Bruckner called this movement his "Farewell to Life". It begins in tonal ambiguity, and is the most troubled opening to any Bruckner Adagio, although it achieves lyrical serenity and awe. The main theme is a portent for the chromaticism of the movement, starting with an upward leap of a minor ninth and containing all 12 tones of the chromatic scale:

The initial tone B is split or differs in its two neighboring notes C and A♯, whereby the distinctive ninth interval jump gives the beginning of the movement an intensive sound charge. The subsequent chromatic downhill C, B, A♯ leads to a sudden crash of octaves, followed by diatonic upright phrases ending in a plaintive tone. Bruckner did not compose another Adagio that raised a unanimous melodic movement without any accompaniment. Bruckner's sketches and drafts show this beginning was unplanned.

The rest of the strings and the Wagner tubas set themselves in full tone on the third beat of the second bar. The latter are used here for the first time in the Ninth Symphony, a delayed method Bruckner has used in his Seventh Symphony. Here, at the beginning of his mourning song for the death of Wagner, Bruckner calls for these instruments to enter, with their round and dark sound, for the first time. The Adagio of the Seventh begins with a full chord accompaniment, unlike in the Ninth. While in the Seventh, the basic key of C♯ minor is set from the beginning, the basic key of E major in the Ninth is initially completely avoided, only called forth after a lengthy delay.

The striking, second part of the motif shows echoes of the so-called Dresden amen. As Clemens Brinkmann states in principle: "Under the influence of Mendelssohn and Wagner, Bruckner used the 'Dresden amen' in his church music and symphonic works". The third, brooding motif in pianissimo is marked by the "tired seconds of the double basses." In a lament, the first oboe swings up and becomes part of a sequencing phase that spirals steadily, eventually leading to the eruption of the fourth motif: a pentatonic trumpet call repeated in this key [E major] seven times [in each measure] without ever being modified " is presented on a tonally aimless chord face resulting from a multiple quintuplet. Michael Adensamer explains this in detail: "One could interpret at least four keys from this layering (E major, B major, C sharp minor and F sharp minor) and still pass the character of this sound. This character lies in the manifold usefulness of the sound. You could extend it up or down until it covered all twelve tones. In this sense it is unlimited, infinite and basically atonal..." On this sound surface, the characteristic trumpet fans are literally staged and counterpointed by a fatefully unfurling horn motif. This motif quotes the expressive beginning of the sentence through the use of the wide-stretched void. The sounds ebb and flow into a mourning chorale by the horns and the Wagner tubas, which Auer and Göllerich, named after Bruckner's "farewell to life". Ernst Décsey also highlights this mourning passage, stating: "Bruckner called this passage [rehearsal mark B] when he played it to the two Helms, returning in 1894 from Berlin."

Near the end of the first theme group, a slowly descending chorale appears. This chorale is cited by Anton Bruckner as the "Farewell to Life". Played by a horn and the Wagner tubas, it is in B♭ minor (a tritone above the movement's overall tonic of E):

The beginning of the second theme group presents a somewhat more melodic, lamenting theme on the violins:

Its second theme, a soft vocal melody, the structure of which is sometimes "compared to the themes of the late Beethoven", undergoes numerous modifications and variations as it progresses. Immediately before the reentry of the main theme, the solo flute descends in a C major triverse above the pale sound primer of an altered-fifth F♯ major seventh chord from the Wagner tubas, to remain on the sound F♯ after a final tritone fall.

==== Second part ====
After a silence, the second part of the Adagio (from bar 77) follows. This is largely based on the components of the main theme. The existing material presented is varied and further developed. The principle of tone splitting is also evident here, above all in the opposite voice of the flute, which as a new element forms a clear counterpoint to the main theme. Only now does the actual implementation work begin, in which the lead motif of the first theme is carried up by proudly walking basses. Afterwards, the milder tone of the varied lyrical theme dominates again. After a brooding intermediate phase, a renewed increasing wave rises, which leads to the climax of the implementation. Once again, trumpets are blaring their already familiar fanfare, which abruptly stop. This is followed by the middle part of the vocal theme, which also ends abruptly. Only the very last end of the phrase is taken up by the oboe and declared in the forte, stemming from the horn in the diminutive form and in the piano. After a general break, the movement quickly pushes open. The crescendo, which has been stretched over a long period, breaks off abruptly, followed by an almost shy-sounding pianissimo part from the woodwinds, which in turn leads to a chorale-like episode of strings and brass. In the opinion of Constantin Floros, there are two passages in the Adagio, each appearing only once and not to "recur in the further course of the composition. This applies once to the tuba [departure from life] at [rehearsal mark] B. [...] This applies to the other for the chorale-like episode, bars 155–162". This spherically-transfigured passage has its origin set structurally in the tubal chorale, decreasing with the chorale into the finale.

==== Third part ====
The third part of the slow movement (from bar 173) begins with a figuratively animated reproduction of the second theme. Floros emphasizes that the Adagio of the Ninth, as well as the finale, "must be viewed against an autobiographical background." Bruckner composed his Ninth Symphony in the awareness of his approaching death. Accordingly, the existing self-citations such as the Miserere from the D minor Mass (bar 181 onward) can also be understood in the sense of a religious connotation. In the third part, the two main themes are stacked atop each other and finally merge; all this takes place in the context of an enormous increase in sound. Bruckner creates a climax, "as if he sought their monumental, expressive power and intensity unparalleled in music history". The enormous accumulation of sound experiences a sharply dissonant discharge in the form of a figuratively extended thirteenth chord in bar 206. Then Bruckner, taking parts of the first theme and the Miserere, weaves a reconciling swan song. Finally, the Adagio of the Ninth ends, fading away; Kurth speaks of this as a "process of dissolution.": As the organ plays a sustained E note on the pedal, the Wagner tubas announce the secondary motif from the Adagio of the Eighth Symphony as the horns recall the beginning of the Seventh.

Throughout its course, the movement goes back to some of the troubled moods of the earlier movements. A call by the oboe – a quote of the Kyrie of Mass No. 3 – introduces the repeat of the first theme, which is underlined by dramatic trombone appeals. Shortly after, Bruckner also quotes, as a kind of supplication, the "Miserere nobis" from the Gloria of his Mass in D minor. The following final climax, given by the full orchestra, concludes on an extremely dissonant chord, a dominant thirteenth:

Thereafter, in the most serene coda yet, the music alludes to the coda of the Adagio of Symphony No. 8, and also hints at Symphony No. 7. These bars of music conclude most live performances and recordings of the symphony, although Bruckner had intended for them to be succeeded by a fourth movement.

== The incomplete fourth movement ==
Although Bruckner is supposed to have suggested using his Te Deum as the finale of the Ninth Symphony, there have been several attempts to complete the symphony with a fourth movement based on Bruckner's surviving manuscripts for the Finale. Indeed, Bruckner's suggestion has been used as a justification for completing the fourth movement, since, in addition to the existence of the fragments of the Finale, it shows (according to scholars such as John A. Phillips), that the composer did not want this work to end with the Adagio.

The materials of this 4th movement have preserved various stages of the composition: from simple profile sketches to more or less completely prepared score sheets, the so-called "bifolio". A bifolio (German: Bogen) consists of a double paper sheet (four pages). Sometimes, there are multiple bifolios, which document Bruckner's different compositional concepts. The largest part of Bruckner's manuscripts of the final movement can be found in the Austrian National Library in Vienna. Other works are located in the Vienna Library, in the library of the University of Music and Performing Arts Vienna, in the Historical Museum of the City of Vienna and in the Jagiellonska Library, Kraków.

Bruckner's estate administrator Theodor Reisch and the testament witnesses, Ferdinand Löwe and Joseph Schalk, according to the minutes of 18 October 1896 divided the estate; Joseph Schalk was commissioned to investigate the connection between the Finale Fragments. The material came into his brother Franz's possession in 1900; Ferdinand Löwe received further material. In 1911, Max Auer examined the surviving material of the final movement, which had been in the possession of Bruckner's former student Joseph Schalk. Referring to a sketch sheet, which is no longer available today, Auer states, "The sketches... reveal a main theme, a fugue theme, a chorale and the fifth theme of the Te Deum". In addition, Auer writes: "Once these themes even towered over one another as in the finale of the Eighth." It is not possible to identify which passage of the finale is actually meant.

While Bruckner's score designs and sketches can be arranged harmoniously, so that a logical musical sequence results, there are five gaps in this musical composition. For instance, the coda is missing. The original material was more extensive and some sheets were lost after Bruckner died. Bruckner's first biographer and secretary, August Göllerich (1859–1923), who was also the secretary of Franz Liszt, began a comprehensive Bruckner biography, which was completed after his death by the Bruckner researcher Max Auer (1880–1962). The authors criticized the disarray in which Bruckner's papers were kept after his death:

It was an unforgivable mistake that an inventory of the estate was not included and an exact list can not be determined. After Dr. Heller's [Bruckner's attending physician] report the sheet music of the Master were laying around and parts of it were taken by qualified and unbidden people. It was even therefore not possible to find the chorale, which the Master had specially composed for Dr. Heller.

The Australian musicologist John A. Phillips researched the different remaining fragments, compiling a selection of the fragments for the Musikwissenschaftlichen Verlag Vienna. In his opinion, the material he obtained is of Bruckner's carefully numbered "autograph score in the making". According to his research, in May 1896, the composition, in the primary stage of the score (strings added, sketches for wind instruments too) was written. In his opinion, half of the final bifolios have been lost to the score today. The course of most of the gaps can be restored from earlier versions and extensive Particell sketches. The surviving remains of the score break off shortly before the coda with the 32nd bifolio. According to Phillips, the sketches contain the progress of the coda to the last cadence. The corresponding sketch for the 36th bifolio still contains the first eight bars with a lying tone of D.

A facsimile edition of Bruckner's surviving final material has been published by Musikwissenschaftliche Verlag Vienna. The largest part of the fragments can now also be viewed in the works database "Bruckner online". Alfred Orel sequenced Bruckner's drafts and sketches of the Ninth Symphony in 1934, assuming that different versions still existed.

The movement, as left by Bruckner, features a "jagged" main theme with a double-dotted rhythm:

This insistent double-dotted rhythm pervades the movement. The second theme group begins with a variant of the main theme. The third theme group features a grand chorale, presented by the full brass. This chorale, a "resplendent resurrection" of the "Farewell to Life" of the Adagio, descends in its first half with a similar mood as the Farewell to Life. In the second half the chorale ascends triumphantly:

The opening motif of the Te Deum appears before the development begins, played by the flute. The brief development contains a bizarre passage with minor-ninth trumpet calls:

A "wild fugue" begins the recapitulation, using a variant of the main theme as a subject:

After the recapitulation of the chorale, a new "epilogue theme" is introduced. Harnoncourt suggested that it probably would have led to the coda. After this cuts off, the only remaining extant music in Bruckner's hand is the previously mentioned initial crescendo and approach to the final cadence.

== Realisations of the finale ==
=== Performances and recordings of the manuscripts of the Finale ===
In 1934, parts of the final composition fragments in the piano version were edited by Else Krüger and performed by her and Kurt Bohnen, in Munich.

In 1940, Fritz Oeser created an orchestral installation for the Finale's exposition. This was performed on 12 October 1940 at the Leipzig Bruckner Festival in a concert of the Great Orchestra of the Reichssenders Leipzig with the conductor Hans Weisbach and transmitted by the radio.

In 1974, Conductor Hans-Hubert Schönzeler played major parts of the Finale for BBC with the BBC Northern Symphony Orchestra.

In his essay, "Approaching a Torso" in 1976, the composer Peter Ruzicka published his research findings regarding the unfinished final movement of the Ninth Symphony. Previously, he recorded parts of the finale with the Berlin Radio Symphony Orchestra.

In 1986 Yoav Talmi with the Oslo Philharmonic Orchestra performed and recorded the whole symphony, including the finale fragments (Orel edition) as well as a movement completion by William Carragan using Bruckner's fragments. The set of 2 discs appeared on Chandos Records (CHAN 8468/9) and received the Grande Prix du Disque in Paris.

In 2002 Peter Hirsch recorded the finale fragments (Phillips edition) with the Rundfunk-Sinfonieorchester Berlin. In the same year during the Salzburger Festspiele, Nikolaus Harnoncourt made a workshop on the finale, during which he performed the retrieved fragments with the Vienna Philharmonic Orchestra.

In 2012, Sir Simon Rattle and the Berliner Philharmoniker published a recording of a four-movement version of the symphony, edited by a team led by Nicola Samale.

In 2025, Kahchun Wong and the Hallé orchestra published a recording of a four-movement version of the symphony, edited by a team led by John A. Phillips.

=== The Te Deum as the finale ===
Many (alleged) utterances by Bruckner concerning his Ninth Symphony have only survived indirectly. Bruckner, fearing that he would not be able to complete his composition, was supposed to have envisioned his Te Deum as the possible end of the symphony. When the conductor Hans Richter (1843–1916) visited Bruckner, he told him (translated from German):

He [Hans Richter] had scheduled Bruckner's Seventh for a concert of the Philharmonic in autumn and now came to the Belvedere [Bruckner's last apartment was in the so-called Kustodenstöckl of the Belvedere Palace in Vienna] to tell it Bruckner. When Bruckner also communicated to him about his misery over the unfinished 4th movement of the Ninth, Richter gave him, as Meissner [Bruckner's close confidant and secretary] reports, the advice to complete the symphony, instead of a fourth movement with the Te Deum. The Master was very grateful for this suggestion, but he looked at it only as a last resort. As soon as he felt reasonably better, he sat down at the piano to work on the finale. He now seemed to think of a transition to the Te Deum and promised, as Meissner relates, a tremendous effect on the far-reaching main theme, blasted out by the brass choir, and on the familiar and original introductory bars of the Te Deum, as well as on the singers appearing there. He wanted, as he told Meissner a few times during audition, to shake, as it were, to the gates of eternity'.

— Anton Bruckner, Ein Lebens- und Schaffens-Bild

Auer continued, about a possible transition to the Te Deum, in the biography (translated from German):

"The Master's student August Stradal and Altwirth assure that he had played for them a 'transition to the Tedeum', Stradal noted out of his memory. This transition music was to lead from E major to C major, the key of the Te Deum. Surrounded by the string figures of the Te Deum, there was a chorale that is not included in the Te Deum. Stradal's remark that the manuscript, that is in Schalk's hands, seems to indicate that it refers to the final bars of the finale score, which Bruckner has overwritten with 'Chorale 2nd Division'. [...] That Bruckner deliberately wanted to bring the Te Deum motif, proves the remark 'Te Deum thirteen bars before the entrance of the Te Deum figure'. As can be proved from the communication of the aforementioned informants, whose correctness can be proved by the hand of the manuscript, the master does not seem to have devised an independent transitional music from the Adagio to the Te Deum, but rather one from the point of reprise, where the coda begins."

— Anton Bruckner, Ein Lebens- und Schaffens-Bild

August Göllerich, Anton Meissner, August Stradal and Theodor Altwirth, who all knew Bruckner personally, reported in unison that Bruckner was no longer able to complete an instrumental finale: "Realizing that the completion of a purely instrumental final movement was impossible, he [Bruckner] attempted to establish an organic connection to the Te Deum, as proposed to him, to produce an emergency closure of the work, contrary to the tonal misgivings." Bruckner, therefore, certainly had tonal misgivings about ending the D minor symphony in C major. Nevertheless, he conceded to the variant with the Te Deum as a final replacement, at least according to the testimony of various eyewitnesses.

Biographer Göllerich knew Bruckner and his environment personally. Subsequent biographers drew on Göllerich's work, so later generations' explanations and assumptions are sometimes considered less accurate than contemporary statements. Contemporary biography suggests Bruckner improvised the end of the symphony at the piano, without fixing the coda in definitive form and in writing. According to the physician's report Bruckner was unwilling to write the symphony in the main thoughts, because he was weak. Bruckner died while working on an instrumental finale and powerful fugue. In the fugue the last almost completely orchestrated score pages are traceable. Subsequent pages are not fully instrumented.

=== Carragan's completion (1983; revised 2003, 2006, 2007, 2010, 2017) ===
The first attempt of a performing version of the Finale available on disc was by William Carragan, who has also done arguably important work editing Bruckner's Second Symphony.

According to Carragan, to create a completion of the Finale, one should have three goals in mind: a faithful presentation of the fragments, an appropriate filling-out both horizontally and vertically, and a positive and triumphant ending.

In his attempt Carragan made a completion in Bruckner's style of the lost bifolios between the retrieved fragments, as well as the often partial, or even barely sketched orchestration, with also insertion of a few metrical adjustments.
A repeat of the catastrophe, which followed the exposition of the Chorale, introduces a 117 measures long coda, which is divided in two parts of 58 and 59 measures. The first part is partly an own composition including the theme of the first-movement, and is partly based on a short-score sketch of the finale, which was not usable elsewhere. The second part, which begins with a fanfare, follows by the chorale with a triadic version of the Adagio theme as a countermelody. Thereafter the Te Deum reappears with its melody and an accompaniment with the theme of the first movement in major mode. Finally the Alleluia of the second theme soars above in triumph, supported by triadic versions of the themes of the other movements.

- The initial completion of 1983 has been premiered by Moshe Atzmon, conducting the American Symphony Orchestra at Carnegie Hall in January 1984. The European premiere by the Utrecht Symfonie Orkest conducted by Hubert Soudant (Utrecht, April 1985), has been the first to be recorded (on LP). Shortly afterwards, this version has been recorded for CD release by Yoav Talmi and the Oslo Philharmonic. Talmi's recording also included the retrieved fragments Bruckner left (Orel edition), so that the listener may determine for himself how much of the realisation was speculation by the editor.
- The revision of 2003 has been recorded by Jason Klein with the Saratoga Symphony Orchestra.
- The revision of 2006 has been recorded by Akira Naito with the Tokyo New City Orchestra. This recording included the Trio No. 2 of 1893 (Ed. Carragan, 2006).
- A variant of 2007 has been performed by Warren Cohen and the Musica Nova Orchestra in November 2009.
- The revision of 2010 has been recorded by Gerd Schaller and the Philharmonie Festiva.
- Carragan has made some additional adjustments in 2017. A recording by Mladen Tarbuk with Croatian Radio Symphony Orchestra can be heard on John Berky's site.

Indeed there can be no fully correct completion, just completions which avoid the most obvious errors, and there will always be debate on many points. But the finale, even as a fragmented and patched-together assemblage, still has a great deal to tell us about the authentic inspiration and lofty goals of Anton Bruckner, and it is a pity not to take every opportunity offered to become familiar with it and its profound meaning.

— William Carragan

In a critical review Richard Osborne reports that Carragan uses both earlier and later bifolios. He bridges the gaps more freely by using sound formations and harmonic connections that are less typical for Bruckner than for later musical history (Mahler). He extends the coda by remaining at a constant fortissimo level for long periods and incorporating a variety of themes and allusions, including the chorale theme and the Te Deum.

=== Samale–Mazzuca completion (1984; revised 1985/1988) ===
The team of Nicola Samale and Giuseppe Mazzuca put together a new realisation from 1983 to 1985. The 1984 completion was recorded in 1986 by Eliahu Inbal and fits in with Inbal's recordings of early versions of Bruckner's symphonies. It was also included by Gennadi Rozhdestvensky in his recording of the different versions of Bruckner's symphonies. The coda of this realisation has more in common with the corresponding passage of the Eighth Symphony than it does with the later Samale, Mazzuca, Phillips and Cohrs realisation.

Samale revised the 1985 completion in 1988 with Benjamin-Gunnar Cohrs and recorded it in the same year with the Katowice National Symphony Orchestra.

=== Samale–Mazzuca–Phillips–Cohrs completion (1992; revised 1996, 2001, 2005, 2007, 2012 and 2021) ===
After the 1988 revision of their completion, Samale and Mazzuca were joined by John A. Phillips and Benjamin-Gunnar Cohrs. A new completion (1992) proposed of one way to realise Bruckner's intention to combine themes from all four movements. This completion has been recorded by Kurt Eichhorn with the Bruckner Orchestra in Linz for the Camerata label. Phillips has also made a transition from the finale completion to the Te Deum. This transition, and its association with the finale and an example of the Te Deum are available the Bruckner Archive.

A 1996 revision of this completion has been recorded in 1998 by Johannes Wildner with the Neue Philharmonie Westfalen for Naxos Records.

An intermediate 2001 revision has been performed in Gmunden on 8 October 2002 by Benjamin-Gunnar Cohrs with the Janacek Philharmonic Orchestra.

A new, revised edition was published in 2005 by Nicola Samale and Benjamin-Gunnar Cohrs. Cohrs' latest research also made it possible to recover the musical content of one missing bifolio in the Fugue fully from the particello-sketch. This new edition, 665 bars long, makes use of 569 bars from Bruckner himself. This version has been recorded by Marcus Bosch with the Sinfonieorchester Aachen for the label Coviello Classics.

A revised reprint of this revision was performed by the Swedish Radio Symphony Orchestra under Daniel Harding, Stockholm, in November 2007. This revision was published in 2008 and was then recorded by conductor Friedemann Layer with the Musikalische Akademie des Nationaltheater-Orchesters, Mannheim. Richard Lehnert explains the changes made for this version.

A "final revision" was made in 2011, in particular including an entirely new conception of the coda. The world premiere of this new ending was given by the Dutch Brabants Orkest under the baton of Friedemann Layer in Breda (NL), 15 October 2011. It was performed in Berlin on 9 February 2012 by Simon Rattle and the Berlin Philharmonic and can be watched on the Internet. This version was released on EMI Classics on 22 May 2012. Rattle conducted the American premiere at Carnegie Hall on 24 February 2012. Simon Rattle conducted this version again with the Berlin Philharmonic on 26 May 2018.

In September–October 2021 – in commemoration of the 125th anniversary of the composer’s death, John A. Phillips undertook an additional revision to it, substantive changes being confined to fugue and coda. Cohrs, who had resigned from the Editorial Team in November 2021, was no more involved in this revision. On 30 November 2022 this latest revision of the Finale Completion was performed by Robin Ticciati and on 4 June 2024 by Eliahu Inbal.

Nicola Samale and Benjamin-Gunnar Cohrs compare in their preface to the study score of the completed performance version of Samale-Phillips-Cohrs-Mazzuca (2008) the reconstruction of a musical work with methods of reconstruction of plastic surgery, forensic pathology, aetiology and fine art:

For this purpose, techniques of reconstruction are required that are not only legitimate in the natural sciences, but vital if one wishes to demonstrate certain processes. Unfortunately, in other fields such reconstruction techniques are accepted far more than in music: In medicine, victims of accidents are more than grateful for the possibility of replacing lost parts of their body by plastic surgery. In forensic pathology, such reconstructions are of value. This was demonstrated very effectively in 1977, when in the eponymous TV series Dr. Quincy reconstructed from a single femur not only the general appearance of the deceased but also that of his murderer (The Thigh Bone's Connected to the Knee Bone by Lou Shaw, also available as a novel by Thom Racina).

Reconstructions are also well known in the fine arts and archaeology. Paintings, torsi of sculptures, mosaics and fresco, shipwrecks, castles, theatres (Venice), Churches (Dresden), and even entire ancient villages have been successfully reconstructed.

For the beginning of the final movement, the SMPC team of authors uses a bifolio in Bruckner's form in a shortened form. To fill in the gaps, the authors rely primarily on later bifolios and sketches of Bruckner, while earlier original material is sometimes disregarded. The authors believe that every gap has a certain number of bars. The gaps are added by the four editors according to the calculations they have made. For the coda, the authors use Bruckner's sequencing sketches, which are also processed by other authors, in a transposed form. The block effect of the final part is achieved mainly by the constant repetition of individual motifs. The authors also include various themes of the finale.

=== Josephson's completion (1992) ===
In his finale edition, Nors S. Josephson makes various cyclical connections to the first and third movement of the symphony. Above all, he refers to a method that Bruckner uses in his Symphony No. 8. Josephson also uses Bruckner's sketched sequencing, which is believed to be part of the coda. In the coda. He refers to the themes of the exposition and avoids further development of the material. Compared to the Adagio, the final movement gets less weight in his edition. Josephson's completion by John Gibbons with the Aarhus Symphony Orchestra has been issued by Danacord: CD DADOCD 754, 2014.

Nors S. Josephson also aims for a reconstruction and states in the preface to his score edition, which is titled as Finale-Reconstruction:

The present edition of the finale to Anton Bruckner's Ninth Symphony is the result of a ten-year-long project. The editor utilized the scetches and score sctetches to this movement that are found in the Oesterreichische Nationalbibliothek in Vienna, Austria, the Viennese Stadt- und Landbibliothek and the Viennese Hochschule für Musik und darstellende Kunst; all of these institutions kindly provided me with microfilms and photographic copies of these sources. In addition, Alfred Orel's 1934 edition of most of these sources as part of the Bruckner Complete Works was a particular value.

=== Letocart's completion (2008, rev. 2022) ===
In 2008 the Belgian organist and composer Sébastien Letocart realized a new completion of the Finale in 2007–08. In the Coda he included quotations of themes from the Fifth, Seventh and Eighth Symphonies, the mid-subject of the Trio as a final Halleluja, and at the end the combination of the four main themes from all four movements of the Ninth.

Letocart's completion, together with the first three parts of the symphony, was recorded in 2008 by the French conductor Nicolas Couton with the MAV Symphony Orchestra of Budapest. Sébastien Letocart states in the booklet text to the CD recording of his final version:

I want to make it quite clear that my completion of the finale of Bruckner's Ninth Symphony is based strictly on Bruckner's own material. This I have orchestrated as faithfully and discretely as possible. There are two main different aspects to understand the purpose of this completion... Firstly, besides having to fill in some of the orchestration of the existing parts, there are six gaps in the development/recapitulation that have to be speculatively reconstructed sometimes with the recreate of coherent links. My forthcoming thesis will give a bar-by-bar explanation of the musicological thinking and meaning behind my completion and additions as well as give details of the reconstruction phase. Secondly, my elaboration of the coda, however, shares neither the same task nor the same concern about the question "what would Bruckner have done" because it is quite simply impossible to know or to guess. We only have a few sketches of and some vague testimonies (Heller, Auer and Graf) about the Finale's continuation; we know nothing even about the precise number of bars, but all these hardly give any idea of the global structure Bruckner had in mind.

During the closing concert of the Bruckner Casco Festival (13 to 15 September 2024) at the Muziekgebouw of Amsterdam, the Camerata RCO featured Anton Bruckner's 9th Symphony in a reduction for 16 musicians arranged by Sébastien Letocart specifically for this occasion.

=== Schaller's completion (2015; revised 2018, 2020, 2024) ===
Gerd Schaller has composed his own completion of the Ninth, closely based on Bruckner's notes. He took into account all available draft materials as far back as the earliest sketches in order to close the remaining gaps in the score as much as possible. He used Bruckner's original manuscript documents, and ran the finale to 736 bars. Additionally, Schaller was able to supplement archival and manuscript material with missing elements in the score by drawing on his experience as a conductor, and applying Bruckner's compositional techniques to the recordings of the complete cycle of all the composer's eleven symphonies. The resulting composition, even the passages without continuous original material, are in a recognizably Brucknerian style. Schaller also creates the broad, dramatically designed reprise of the main theme from Bruckner's earlier sketches. In the coda he quotes the opening theme of the first movement, thereby bridging the beginning of the symphony, a technique of quoting that Bruckner himself used in his symphonies (Symphony No. 3 and Symphony No. 5) and originating back to Beethoven. In the final part of the coda, Schaller renounces the quotations from other works by Bruckner in his newly published revised edition of 2018.

Schaller first performed his version of the finale with the Philharmonie Festiva in the abbey church at Ebrach on 24 July 2016, as part of the Ebrach Summer Music Festival.

In March 2018 Schaller's revised version was published by Ries and Erler, Berlin, Score No 51487, ISMN M-013-51487-8. Schaller performed his revised version of the finale in the abbey church at Ebrach on 22 July 2018. This performance is issued on Profil CD PH18030.

In 2020, Schaller made an organ adaptation of his completion of the finale, which he performed in November 2020 on the Eisenbarth organ in Ebrach. A CD with this performance is published by Profile: CD Set PH 21010, 2021.

In 2024, Schaller made a further revision of his completion of the finale, which he performed in September of 2024 on the Ebrach Summer Music Festival.

Gerd Schaller explains a reconstruction in itself as an impossible undertaking:

Before work could begin on the completion, though, a number of conceptual questions needed to be addressed... It soon became apparent that a "reconstruction", as such, would logically be infeasible, quite simply because it is impossible to reconstruct something that previously never existed in a finished form. And in any case, which version of the score should be reconstructed?... It is known that Bruckner frequently revised and amended his works, and he undoubtedly would have subjected the supposedly finished pages of the Ninth to numerous thorough reviews. It follows that there is no complete version that can be taken as a basis for reconstruction. In short, it seemed impossible for me to reconstruct a hypothetical musical masterpiece by such a genius as Anton Bruckner, and so I made it my aim to pursue historical accuracy by drawing on all the available fragments and thus supplement and complete the finale in the most authentic way possible and in keeping with Bruckner's late style. My top priority in this endeavour was to use, or at least consider, as much of Bruckner's original material as possible and thus avoid speculation as far as possible. The previously seldom perused, early sketches were another important source of essential Brucknerian ideas.

=== Earlier attempts of finale completions ===
- Hein 's-Gravesande (1969): a simple juxtaposition of the retrieved fragments, like that in the Harnoncourt conference concert.
- Ernst Märzendorfer (1969). This first attempt at completion is a kind of rhapsody, which uses the fragments edited by Orel, completes their orchestration and intersperses them with other elements, and ends with a short conclusion in empty fifth like that of the first movement. This composition has been performed by the composer with the Rundfunk-Sinfonieorchester Leipzig in the Große Oper of Leipzig on 8 December 1970 − Recording on CD Deutsches Rundfunkarchiv DRA StMM577 (not publicly available).
- Marshall Fine (1979). The manuscript of this completion, which was considered lost, has been recently retrieved.

=== Other attempts of finale completions ===
- Jacques Roelands (2003, rev. 2014)
- Roberto Ferrazza (2017). This completion has been premiered by Alfonso Scarano with the Thailand Philharmonic Orchestra on 26 March 2022.
- Kimiaki Tanaka (2020, rev. 2024)
- Martin Bernhard (2022)
- Ishii Nozomu (2025)

=== Free compositions incorporating material from the finale sketches ===
Free compositions incorporating material from the finale sketches were made by Peter-Jan Marthé (2006), and a "Bruckner Dialog" by Gottfried von Einem (1971).

== Published editions (First three movements) ==
Bruckner did not make many revisions of his Ninth Symphony. Multiple editions of his work and attempted completions of the symphony's unfinished fourth movement have been published.

=== Löwe edition (1903) ===
This was the first published edition of the Ninth Symphony. It was also the version performed at the work's posthumous premiere, and the only version heard until 1932. Ferdinand Löwe made multiple unauthorized changes to the Symphony amounting to a wholesale re-composition of the work. In addition to second-guessing Bruckner's orchestration, phrasing and dynamics, Löwe also dialed back Bruckner's more adventurous harmonies, such as the complete dominant thirteenth chord in the Adagio.

=== Orel edition (1934) ===
This was the first edition to attempt to reproduce what Bruckner had actually written. It was first performed in 1932 by the Munich Philharmonic conducted by Siegmund von Hausegger, in the same program immediately following a performance of Löwe's edition. The edition was published, possibly with adjustments, two years later (1934) under the auspices of the Gesamtausgabe.

=== Nowak edition (1951) ===
It is a re-edition of the Orel edition of 1934. The Nowak edition is the most commonly performed one today.

=== Cohrs edition (2000) ===
A new edition of the complete three movements was recorded by Nikolaus Harnoncourt, Simon Rattle and Simone Young. It corrects several printing errors and includes extensive explanation of the editorial problems. The separate Critical Report of Cohrs contains numerous facsimiles from the first three movements. It includes an edition of the two earlier Trios for concert performance.

== Sheet music ==
- Anton Bruckner: Symphonie No. 9 D Moll, Eigentum der Universal-Edition, Vienna. Ernst Eulenburg, Leipzig (No. 67)
- Alfred Orel: Entwürfe und Skizzen zur Neunten Sinfonie. Sonderdruck zu Band 9 der Anton-Bruckner-Gesamtausgabe, 1934
- Leopold Nowak (ed.): Anton Bruckner, IX. Symphonie d-Moll. Musikwissenschaftlicher Verlag Vienna, 1951.
- Anton Bruckner: Symphony No. 9 in d (Original version 1894, ed. by Haas und Orel.). Luck's Music Library (#05148).
- Anton Bruckner: Symphonie Nr. 9 d-Moll, Robert Haas, Alfred Orel, Fassung 1894. "Die Klassiker" Vienna.
- Benjamin-Gunnar Cohrs (ed.): Anton Bruckner, IX. Symphonie d-moll (1. Satz – Scherzo & Trio – Adagio), kritische Neuausgabe unter Berücksichtigung der Arbeiten von Alfred Orel und Leopold Nowak, Partitur und Stimmen. Vienna 2000.
- Benjamin-Gunnar Cohrs (ed.): Anton Bruckner, IX. Symphonie d-moll (1. Satz – Scherzo & Trio – Adagio), kritischer Bericht zur Neuausgabe. Vienna 2001.
- Benjamin-Gunnar Cohrs (ed.): Anton Bruckner, IX. Symphonie d-moll, Scherzo & Trio, Studienband zum 2. Satz. Vienna 1998.
- Benjamin-Gunnar Cohrs (ed.): Anton Bruckner, 2 nachgelassene Trios zur IX. Symphonie d-moll, Aufführungsfassung, Partitur incl. kritischer Kommentar und Stimmen. Vienna 1998.
- Nors S. Josephson (editor): Anton Bruckner, Finale zur 9. Sinfonie, Ergänzungen von Nors S. Josephson, score (DIN A4), 162 pages, Carus-Verlag, Stuttgart, 2007, No 40.588/00.
- John A. Phillips (editor): Anton Bruckner, IX. Symphonie d-moll, Finale (unfinished), Rekonstruktion der Autograph-Partitur nach den erhaltenen Quellen. study score, Vienna 1994/99.
- John A. Phillips (editor): Anton Bruckner, IX. Symphonie d-moll, Finale (unfinished), Rekonstruktion der Autograph-Partitur nach den erhaltenen Quellen, Dokumentation des Fragments, Partitur einschl. Kommentar und Stimmen. Vienna 1999/2001.
- John A. Phillips (editor): Anton Bruckner, IX. Symphonie d-moll, Finale (unfinished), Faksimile-Ausgabe sämtlicher autographen Notenseiten. Vienna 1996.
- Nicola Samale, John A. Phillips, Giuseppe Mazzuca, Benjamin-Gunnar Cohrs (editor): Anton Bruckner: IX. Symphonie d-moll, Finale. Vervollständigte Aufführungsfassung Samale-Phillips-Cohrs-Mazzuca. Neuausgabe mit kritischem Kommentar, New edition with critical comment (dt./engl.) by Benjamin-Gunnar Cohrs. München 2005/Letztmalig revidierter Nachdruck 2012, Repertoire Explorer Study Score 444.
- Gerd Schaller (editor): Anton Bruckner, Neunte Symphonie d-Moll IV. Satz, Supplemented from original sources and completed by Gerd Schaller, revised edition with extensive analytical comments, text (in German and English) (87 pages), score (120 pages), ISMN M-013-51487-8, Ries & Erler, Berlin 2018, score No 51487.
- Anton Bruckner, Nona Sinfonia, Finale, integrazioni a cura di Roberto Ferrazza, Rome, BetMultimedia, 2017 (vol. I: versione filologica, con note in appendice; vol. II: versione esecutiva)

== Discography of the complete symphony ==
Recordings of the completions of the fourth movement are usually coupled with the Nowak or Cohrs edition for the first three movements.

A recording of the Orel or Nowak edition on average lasts about 65 minutes, though a fast conductor like Carl Schuricht can get it down to 56 minutes (ASD 493}.

The oldest complete performance (of the three completed movements) preserved on record is by Otto Klemperer with the New York Philharmonic from 1934.

The first commercial recording was made by Siegmund von Hausegger with the Munich Philharmonic in 1938 for His Master's Voice. Both recordings used the Orel edition.

The apocryphal Löwe version is available on CD remasterings of LPs by Hans Knappertsbusch and F. Charles Adler. These can be as short as 51 minutes.

The earliest recordings of the Orel edition were Oswald Kabasta's live performance with the Munich Philharmonic in 1943 for the Music and Arts label, and Wilhelm Furtwängler's studio performance with the Berlin Philharmonic in 1944 (multiple labels).

After Bruno Walter's studio recording with the Columbia Symphony Orchestra in 1959 for Sony/CBS, the Nowak edition was preferred.

The most recent Orel edition recording was Daniel Barenboim's live performance with the Berlin Philharmonic in 1991 for Teldec.

Nikolaus Harnoncourt and the Vienna Philharmonic recorded the Ninth (Cohrs edition) and the Finale fragment for BMG/RCA in 2003 – without the coda sketches.

In the CD "Bruckner unknown" (PR 91250, 2013) Ricardo Luna recorded the Scherzo, the three versions of the Trio (own edition) as well as the Finale fragment – with the coda sketches.

== See also ==
- Curse of the ninth
