= Miltiades Caridis =

German-Greek conductor

Miltiades Caridis (Greek: Μιλτιάδης Καρύδης; 9 May 1923 – 1 March 1998) was a German-Greek conductor.

== Biography ==
Caridis was born in the Free City of Danzig (Gdańsk). His mother was a Danziger of German ethnicity, his father was a Greek tobacco merchant. His family moved to Weimar Germany and he was raised in Dresden, but his family moved to Greece in 1938, sensing that war was imminent. According to the biography Caridis was thus the only member of his Dresden school class to survive World War II. After the war, he studied with Hans Swarowsky in Vienna. His career spanned opera in Cologne, Graz and Vienna. He has also conducted the Philharmonia Hungarica, the Oslo Philharmonic and the Tonkünstlerorchester. He was awarded the Béla Bartók medal in 1981 for his contribution in fomenting the appeal of the composer's work.

He died in Athens from a stroke he sustained while he was rehearsing with the Ellinikí Radiofonía Tileórasi Greek National Orchestra.
