= Symphony No. 8 (Schubert) =

1822 incomplete symphony by Franz Schubert

Symphony in B minor
- by Franz Schubert
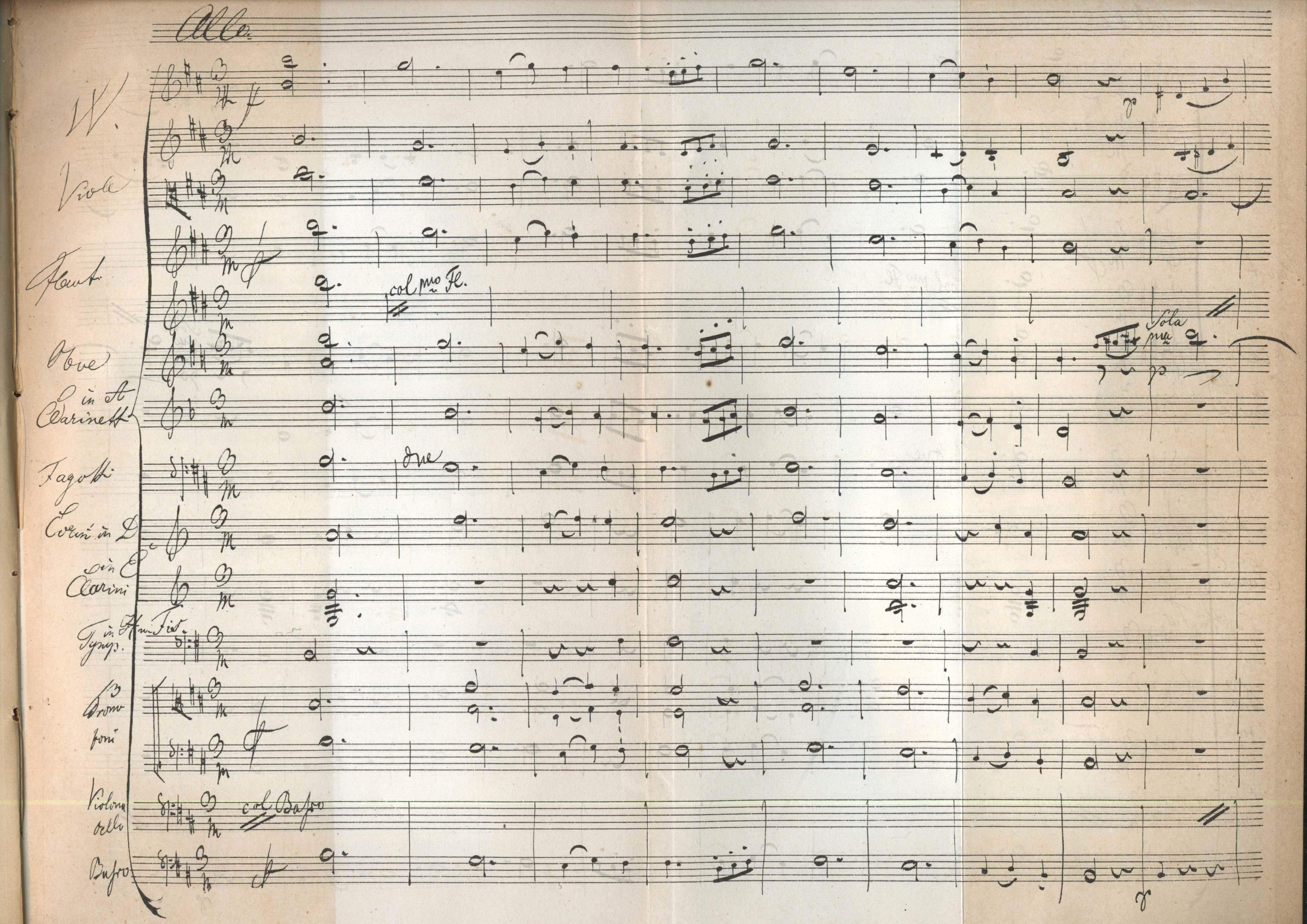
- Third movement, first page, facsimile, 1885, in J. R. von Herbeck's biography
- Other name: Unfinished Symphony
- Catalogue: D. 759
- Composed: 1822
- Movements: Two completed, fragments of two other movements
- Scoring: Orchestra

Premiere
- Date: 17 December 1865
- Location: Musikverein, Vienna
- Conductor: Johann von Herbeck
- Performers: Gesellschaft der Musikfreunde

Franz Schubert's Symphony in B minor, D. 759 (often numbered as Symphony No. 8, or 7 in accordance with the revised Deutsch catalogue and the Neue Schubert-Ausgabe), commonly known as the Unfinished Symphony (German: Unvollendete), is a musical composition that Schubert started in 1822 but left with only two movements—though he lived for another six years. A scherzo, nearly completed in piano score but with only two pages orchestrated, also survives.

It has been theorized by some musicologists, including Brian Newbould, that Schubert may have sketched a finale that instead became the big B minor entr'acte from his incidental music to Rosamunde, but all evidence for this is circumstantial. One possible reason for Schubert's leaving the symphony incomplete is the predominance of the same meter (triple meter). The first movement is in 3/4, the second in 3/8 and the third (an incomplete scherzo) again in 3/4. Three consecutive movements in basically the same meter rarely occur in classical symphonies, sonatas, or chamber works.

The symphony is sometimes called the first Romantic symphony (an attribution also given to Beethoven's Eroica Symphony which premiered seventeen years earlier), due to its emphasis on the lyrical impulse within the dramatic structure of Classical sonata form. Furthermore, its orchestration is not solely tailored for functionality, but specific combinations of instrumental timbre that are prophetic of the later Romantic movement, with wide vertical spacing occurring for example at the beginning of the development.

Musicologists disagree as to why Schubert abandoned the symphony. Some have speculated that he stopped work in the middle of the scherzo in the fall of 1822 because he associated it with his initial outbreak of syphilis—or that he was distracted by the inspiration for his Wanderer Fantasy for solo piano, which occupied his time and energy immediately afterward. It could have been a combination of both factors.

== Early history ==
In 1823, the Graz Music Society gave Schubert an honorary diploma. He felt obliged to dedicate a symphony to them in return, and sent his friend Anselm Hüttenbrenner, a leading member of the Society, an orchestral score he had written in 1822 consisting of the two completed movements of the Unfinished plus at least the first two pages of the start of a scherzo. This much is known.

What may never be known is how much of the symphony Schubert actually wrote, and how much of what he did write he gave to Hüttenbrenner. The following exists:

- The first two movements, complete in full score
- The first two pages of a scherzo in full score

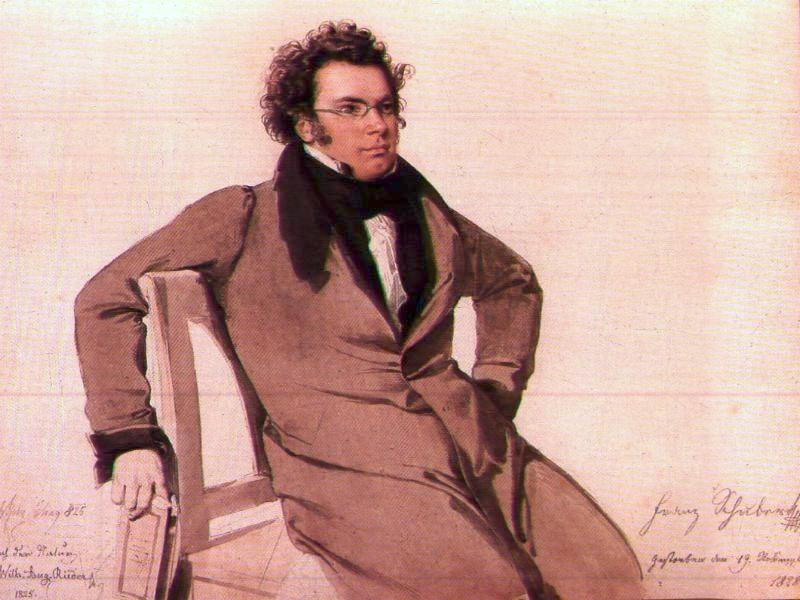
Watercolour of Franz Schubert by Wilhelm August Rieder (1825)

The rest of the scherzo (except for the missing second strain of the trio) exists in a separate manuscript in short score (not sent to Hüttenbrenner, but found among Schubert's copious manuscripts after his death and carefully preserved by his devoted schoolteacher brother Ferdinand), along with a complete short score of the second movement and the end of the first movement, but nothing of any fourth movement. A fourth movement finale in the home key (B minor) would have been the norm for any symphony written at that time, but there is no direct evidence that Schubert ever started work on it. It has, however, been surmised that the most extended entr'acte from Rosamunde (also in B minor, in the same style of the first movement and with the same instrumentation as the symphony) was indeed that fourth movement, which Schubert recycled by inserting it into his Rosamunde incidental music composed in early 1823 just after the Wanderer Fantasy.

The Schubert scholar Brian Newbould, who harmonized, orchestrated and conjecturally completed the piano sketch of the scherzo, believed this to be true; but not all scholars agree. Pages appear to have been torn out after the beginning of the scherzo in the full score sent to Hüttenbrenner, in any event. That Hüttenbrenner neither had the work performed, nor even let the society know he had the manuscript, is curious and has spawned various theories.

Old age and approaching death seem to have influenced Hüttenbrenner to reveal the work to an important and gracious visitor at long last (in 1865, when he was 71 and had only three more years to live). This was the conductor Johann von Herbeck, who premiered the extant two movements on 17 December 1865 in Vienna with the Gesellschaft der Musikfreunde, adding the busy but expressively lightweight perpetual-motion last movement of Schubert's 3rd Symphony in D major, as a finale. The performance was received with great enthusiasm by the audience. The score of those two movements was not published before 1867.

The Unfinished Symphony has been called No. 7 (recently, for example, in the New Schubert Edition) instead of No. 8 as it usually is in the traditional English system, since the other work, in E major, completed by Felix Weingartner, sometimes referred to as Schubert's 7th was also left incomplete but in a different way, with at least fragments of all four of its movements in Schubert's hand.

== The completed movements ==
The two complete movements (scored for 2 flutes, 2 oboes, 2 clarinets, 2 bassoons, 2 horns, 2 trumpets, 3 trombones, timpani and strings), which are all of the symphony as it is performed in the concert repertoire, are:

=== I. Allegro moderato ===
I. Allegro moderato
Performed by Fulda Symphonic Orchestra, recording in 2000

The first movement, in B minor, opens in sonata form, softly in the strings, followed by a theme shared by the solo oboe and clarinet. A typically laconic Schubertian transition consists of just four measures for the two horns, effectively modulating to G major (measures 38–41).

The second subject begins with a celebrated lyrical melody in that key, stated first by the cellos and then by the violins (sometimes drolly sung to Sigmund Spaeth's words as "This is ... the sym-phoneee ... that Schubert wrote but never fin-ished") to a gentle syncopated accompaniment. This is interrupted by a dramatic closing group alternating heavy tutti sforzandi interspersed with pauses and developmental variants of the G major melody, ending the exposition.

Opening melody (celli and basses)

First theme (oboe and clarinet)

Second theme (celli)

An important moment in the first movement occurs in measure 109 (and repeats in the recapitulation in measure 327). In these measures, Schubert holds a tonic B pedal in the second bassoon and first horn under the dominant F♯ chord, that evokes the end of the development in Beethoven's Eroica Symphony.

Unusually for sonata form, the development section begins with a quiet restatement of the opening melody in the subdominant (E minor), a tonality usually reserved for near the end of a sonata form movement somewhere in the recapitulation or coda, and rises to a prolonged climax in the same key, starting with a dramatic variant of the opening melody in prominent trombones over a full orchestra. The expected relative major (D) of the tonic minor first appears only at the end of that climax, and then again for the second subject of the recap (in place of the expected tonic B major)—instead of much earlier, in the second subject of the exposition, as customary. The flutes and oboes then resume their melodic role at the end of that dramatic outburst, transitioning to the recapitulation.

The recapitulation consists mostly of orthodox sonata-form restatement of the themes, except that Schubert modulates early in the recapitulation first to E minor then to F♯ minor, restates the second theme in the relative key of D major, and modulates back to the parallel mode of B major to close the recapitulation. The coda in the tonic B minor recalls the opening theme for still another, final, dramatic reworking to pave the way for the emphatic concluding chords.

=== II. Andante con moto ===
II. Andante con moto
Performed by Fulda Symphonic Orchestra, recording in 2000

First theme

The second movement, in E major, alternates two contrasting themes in sonatina form (sonata form without development), with a quietly dramatic, elegiac, extended coda that could be characterized as a concluding development section. The lyrical first theme is introduced by the horns, low strings, brass, and high strings playing in counterpoint. The plaintive second theme, in minor, after four simple unharmonized notes in transition spelling out the tonic chord of the relative C♯ minor quietly by the first violins, begins in the solo clarinet in C♯ minor and continues in the solo oboe in C♯ major in an example of the major–minor juxtapositions that are a hallmark of Schubert's harmonic language.

A dramatic closing theme in the full orchestra returns to C♯ minor, but ends in D♭ major (the enharmonic equivalent of C♯ major). A short transition back to the tonic E major ushers in the recapitulation—notable for how it restates the second theme in the subdominant A minor (instead of the expected tonic parallel E minor) begun by the oboe and continued by the clarinet (vice versa to their roles in the exposition).

The coda starts with a new theme that is simply an extension of the two-bar E major cadential figure that opens the movement. This gives way to the laconic triadic first-violin transition motto, which leads to a restatement of the first theme by the woodwinds in distant A♭ major followed by the motto again leading back to the tonic E major for a final extended transformation of the first theme, leading in turn to a final extended version of the opening cadential figure that reappears to close.

== Third and fourth movements ==
Scherzo theme

The fragment of the scherzo intended as the third movement returns to the tonic B minor, with a G major trio. The first 8 measures are preserved in full score, but the entire rest of the scherzo proper (both strains) only in short score. Only the first strain of the trio exists, and that as a mere unadorned, unharmonized single melodic line. The second strain is entirely absent. The sketches of the scherzo were performed by Takashi Asahina with the Osaka Philharmonic Orchestra in the Minoh Civic Hall on 17 January 1972.

After Hüttenbrenner's release of the two completed movements of the Unfinished to Herbeck, some music historians and scholars took much trouble to "prove" the composition complete even in the truncated two-movement form, and indeed that abbreviated structure alone has captivated the listening public to consider it as one of Schubert's most cherished compositions. The fact that classical tradition was unlikely to accept that a symphony could end in a different key from the one it began in (with the B minor first movement and the E major finale by default incomplete), and the even more undeniable fact that Schubert had begun a third movement in B minor (leaving precisely 8 bars of fully orchestrated scherzo and 112 succeeding bars in short score), stands against the view that the two completed movements can legitimately stand alone.

== Reception ==
Reviewing the premiere of the symphony in 1865, the music critic Eduard Hanslick stressed that the music is among Schubert's "most beautiful":

When ... clarinet and oboe in unison began their gentle cantilena above the calm murmur of the violins ... 'Schubert' was whispered in the audience. ... And when, after this nostalgic cantilena in the minor, there followed the contrasting G major theme of the violoncellos, a charming song of almost Ländler-like intimacy, every heart rejoiced, as if, after a long separation, the composer himself were among us in person. The whole movement is a melodic stream so crystal clear, despite its force and genius, that one can see every pebble on the bottom. And everywhere the same warmth, the same bright, life-giving sunshine!

The Andante develops more broadly. A few odd hints here and there of complaint or irritation are interwoven ... their effect is that of musical thunder clouds .... As if loath to leave his own gentle song, the composer puts off too long the end ....

The tonal beauty ... is fascinating. With a few horn figurations and ... a clarinet or oboe solo, Schubert achieves ... effects which no refinement of Wagnerian instrumentation can capture.

== Modern completions ==
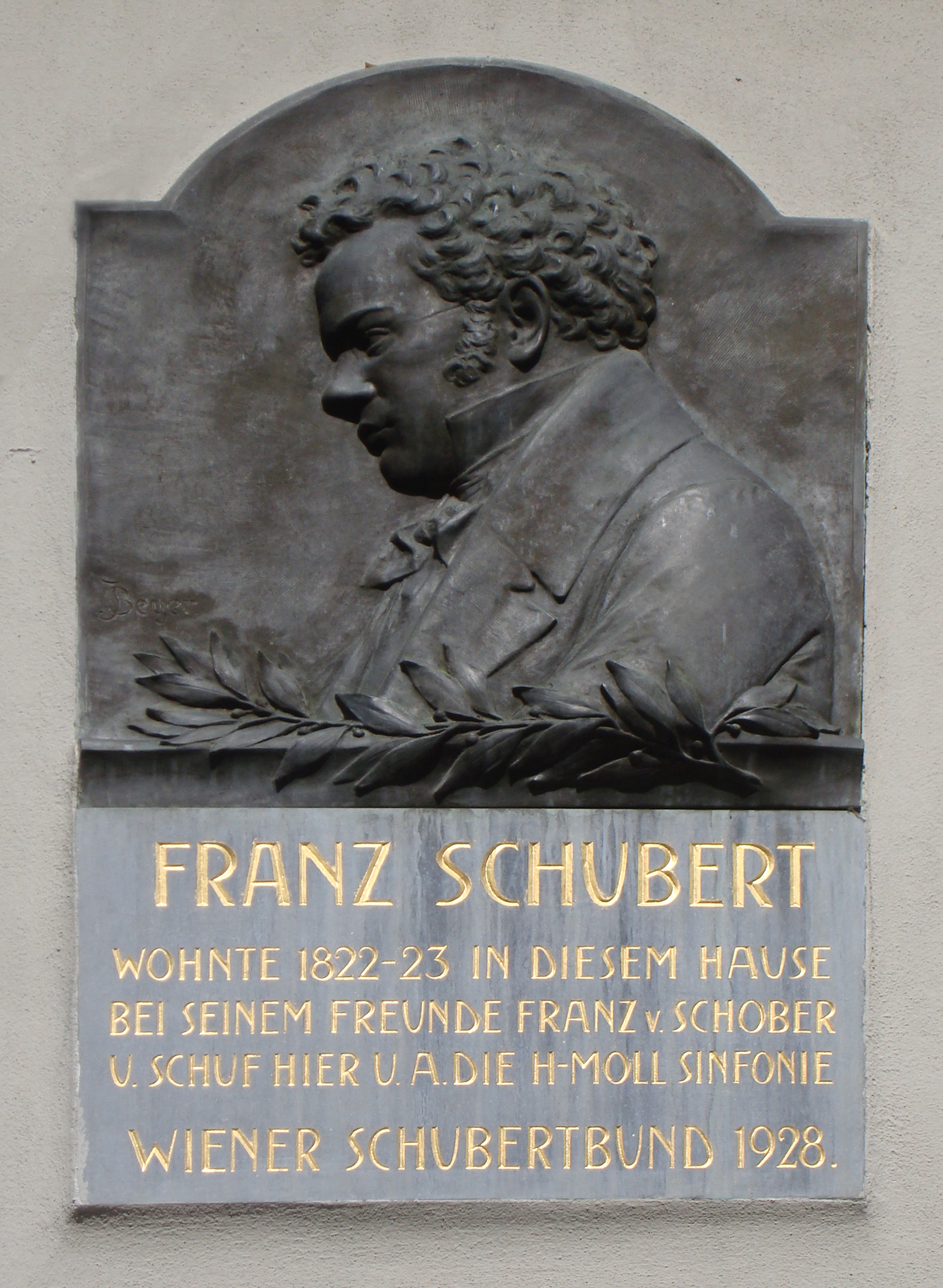
Franz Schubert Memorial in Vienna. Schubert lived here in 1822–23 with his friend Franz von Schober and wrote the Unfinished Symphony.

In 1927–28, Felix Weingartner composed his Sixth Symphony, La Tragica (in memory of 19 November 1828, the day Schubert died), as a tribute to Schubert on the centenary of his death. The second movement of Weingartner's symphony is a realization of Schubert's incomplete sketch of the scherzo (seventy years before Newbould's independent effort).

In 1928, the 100th anniversary of Schubert's death, Columbia Records held a worldwide competition for the best conjectural completion of the Unfinished. About 100 completions were submitted, but also a much larger number of original works. The pianist Frank Merrick won the "English Zone" of the competition; his scherzo and finale were later performed and recorded.

Only some of the completions—Merrick's is not one of them—used material from Schubert's scherzo sketch. The first movement of Joseph Holbrooke's Fourth Symphony, one of the British entries, is mostly a performing version of the sketch (the second strain of the trio of which, entirely missing from the sketch, had to be conjecturally completed), and a theme from the scherzo appears in his finale. Independent completions of the scherzo movement also were made by Geoffrey Bush in 1944 and conductor Denis Vaughan.

More recently, British musicologists Gerald Abraham and Brian Newbould have also offered completions of the symphony (scherzo and finale) using Schubert's scherzo sketch and the extended B minor first entr'acte from his incidental music to the play Rosamunde Schubert wrote a few months later, long suspected by some musicologists as originally intended as the Unfinished's finale. (In fact, it was even played as the finale as long ago as the British premiere of the symphony on 6 April 1867.) Its first movement, the scherzo sketch and the entr'acte are all in B minor, their instrumentation is the same, and the entr'acte (like the first movement) is in sonata form (as are all Schubert's symphonic finales) and in a very similar style and mood. If the entr'acte indeed started life as the finale of this symphony, then Schubert evidently recycled it (probably at that stage unorchestrated) from the symphony to the incidental music, presumably orchestrating it for the play and perhaps making compositional changes. The Brian Newbould’s completion has been recorded by Neville Marriner in 1983 and the Orchestra of the Age of Enlightenment in 1990.

British pianist and Schubert specialist Anthony Goldstone prepared a new 4-movement performing edition of the symphony for piano duet, using the transcription of the first two movements prepared by Hüttenbrenner, his own completion of Schubert's scherzo, and the Rosamunde entr'acte in a transcription by Friedrich Hermann, edited by Goldstone. The work in this completed version was given its first recording in 2015 by Goldstone and his wife/duet partner Caroline Clemmow as part of their 'Schubert: Unauthorised Piano Duos' series for Divine Art Records.

In 1988, the American musicologist William Carragan produced his own completion of the scherzo and finale also using Schubert's sketch of the scherzo and augmenting the Rosamunde B minor entr'acte for the finale, in particular adding a slow introduction based on the second Rosamunde entr'acte. This version was performed and recorded by Gerd Schaller with the Philharmonie Festiva for Profil Records. Another performance of Carragan's completion – with a few small changes – by the MusicaNova Orchestra is available on YouTube.

Another completion has been made and recorded by the conductor Mario Venzago, using the Ballet Music No.1 from Rosamunde as well as the entr'acte for the Trio.

A completion has also been made by Benjamin-Gunnar Cohrs and Nicola Samale. A first version (2004) has been performed on 24 September 2010 by Yoon Kuk Lee with the St. Gellert Academy Orchestra. In 2015, Cohrs published a new urtext edition of the Symphony, which contains the Scherzo as the third movement and uses the intermediate act music No. 1 of the incidental music for "Rosamunde" as the fourth movement. This edition was performed on 28 April 2018 by Stefan Gottfried] with the Concentus Musicus Wien at the Vienna Musikverein.

The Russian composer Anton Safronov completed the scherzo sketch and created a new finale for the symphony (some themes of the latter based on themes from several Schubert piano works), which he described as "an attempt to move into the mind of the composer". His completion was performed at the Royal Festival Hall in London on 6 November 2007 with the Orchestra of the Age of Enlightenment, and on 2 October 2007 with the Russian National Orchestra (followed by the American tour in the early 2008,) both performances conducted by Vladimir Jurowski. Due to his unusual use of material from Schubert keyboard works in the finale, Safronov's completion has been subject to criticism varying from definitely positive to ambivalent and negative.

Robin Holloway, Cambridge University professor of composition, has realized the Scherzo based on, but not bound to, the sketches; e.g., with two trios, the first from Schubert's sketch and the second entirely his own composition. It was premiered by the Cambridge University Musical Society on 18 June 2011.

In January 2019, Chinese technology company Huawei used artificial intelligence to create hypothetical melodies for the third and fourth movements, based on which Lucas Cantor then arranged an orchestral score. The composition was performed live at Cadogan Hall in London on 4 February 2019. However, many consider that the result is disappointing and far from Schubert's style. Goetz Richter writes, for instance: "The completed movements are trivial and achieve ultimately a loose and inauthentic family resemblance to Schubert".

== See also ==
- The composer and pianist Leopold Godowsky composed a Passacaglia with 44 Variations, cadenza and fugue on the opening theme of Schubert's Unfinished Symphony, for solo piano. Godowsky added a quarter-note F♯ to the beginning of Schubert's theme, as an anacrusis.
- The composer Gilad Hochman composed a contemporary homage to Schubert's Symphony titled Shedun Fini (metathesis of the word 'Unfinished') for a clarinet–cello–piano trio in form of Prelude and Allegro, using different quotations and stylistic influences.
