= Musik-Konzepte =

Quarterly series of German language texts on musicology

Musik-Konzepte is a quarterly series of German language musicology texts founded in 1977 by Heinz-Klaus Metzger and Rainer Riehn and dedicated to the avant-garde in music of all epochs. Since 2004 it has been edited by Ulrich Tadday.

== History ==
Musik-Konzepte has been published by edition text + kritik from its founding in 1977. It was edited by Heinz-Klaus Metzger and Rainer Riehn (volumes 1–122) until the contract was terminated by the publisher as of December 31, 2003. They now edit a similarly named series, querstand. musikalische konzepte

Since January 2004, the musicologist Ulrich Tadday has edited Musik-Konzepte. The first volume edited by him (# 123) deals with the composer Charles Ives. In 1983, the editors were awarded the Deutscher Kritikerpreis (German Critics' Award).

== Content ==
Based on Theodor W. Adorno's theory of the aesthetics of music, Musik-Konzepte has dedicated itself to composers not only considered to be progressive by the editors, in every era. The series combines musical tradition and innovation, historical and contemporary. Musik-Konzepte deals with either a composer and his work or a theme that is considered important from a musical, aesthetic, historical or sociologically perspective. For instance, volume 74 Musik und Traum (1991). The series is targeted to not only musicologists savvy, but also at a general readership of those with an interest in music.

== Publication ==
Musik-Konzepte is published quarterly, with volumes available either individually or by a discounted subscription which includes the additional annual special edition volume at a reduced price. Students are offered a discounted subscription.

== Volumes ==
- Riehn, Rainer; Metzger, Heinz-Klaus, eds. (January 2000). Musik-Konzepte 107: Perotinus Magnus (in German). Munich: edition text + kritik. ISBN 3-88377-629-7.
- Tadday, Ulrich, ed. (August 2018). Musik-Konzepte 182 : Rolf Riehm. Munich: edition text + kritik. ISBN 978-3-86916-710-7.
