= Siegmund von Hausegger =

Austrian composer and conductor

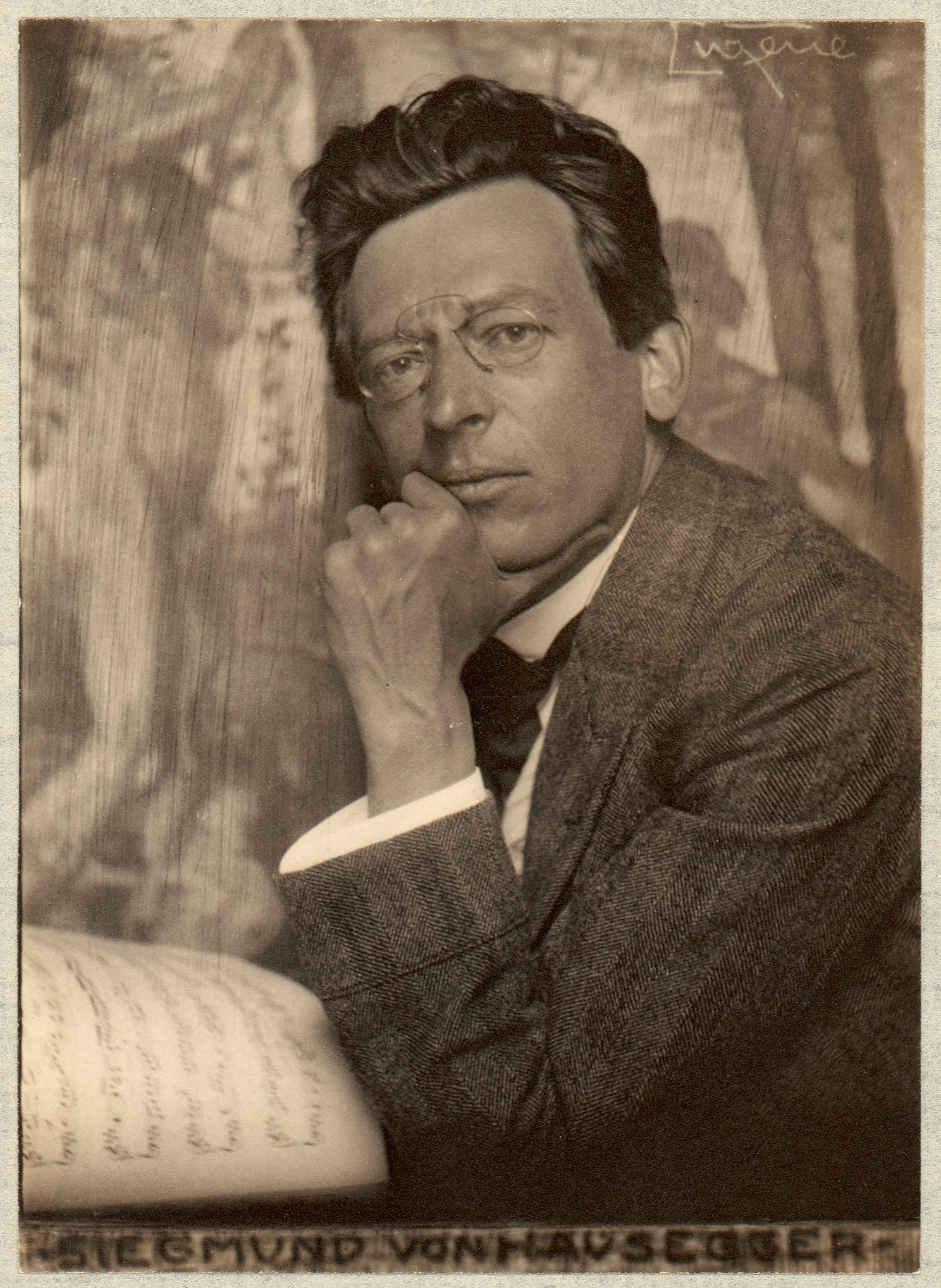
Siegmund von Hausegger

Siegmund von Hausegger (16 August 1872 – 10 October 1948) was an Austrian composer and conductor.

== Early life ==
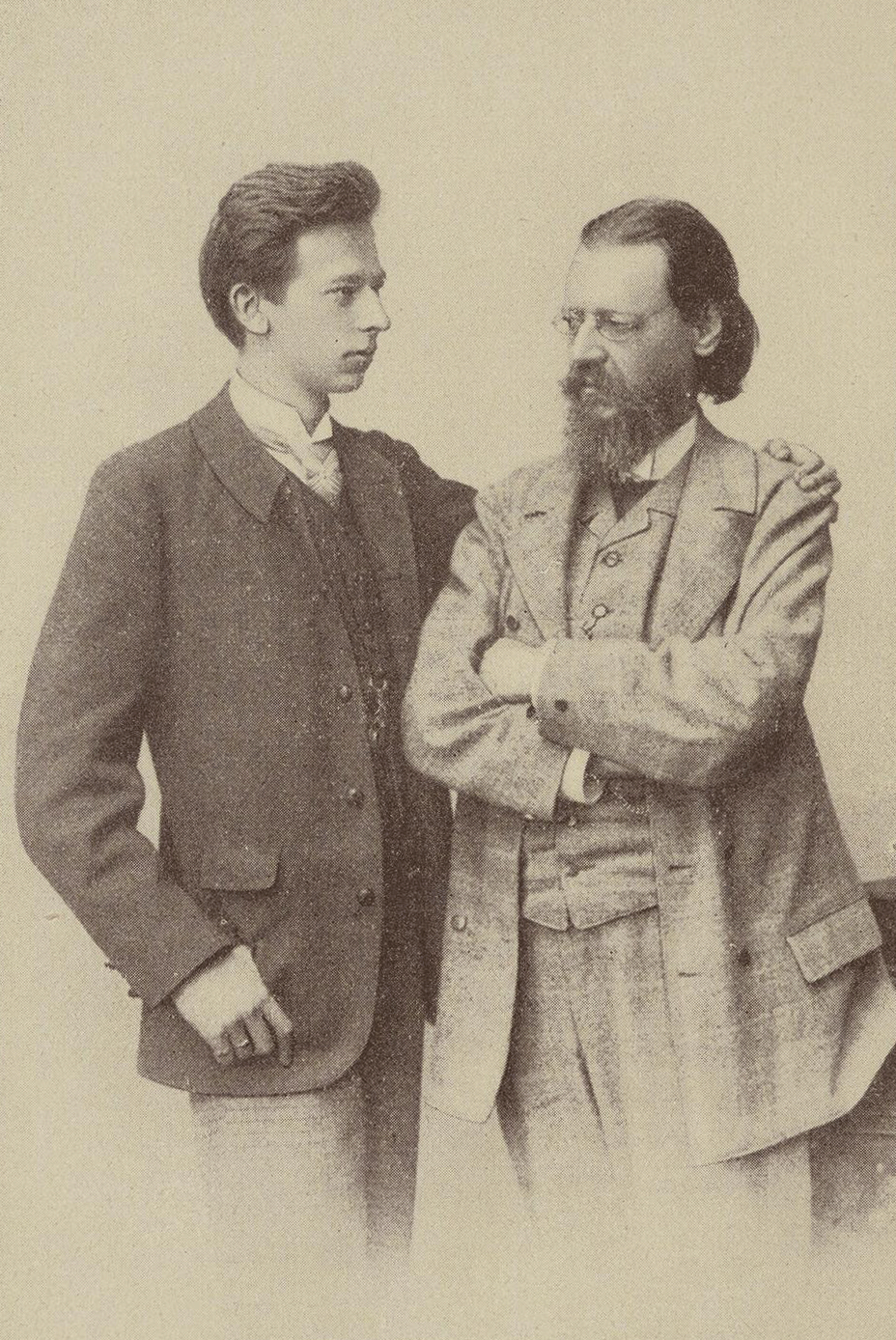
Siegmund von Hausegger with his father, Friedrich von Hausegger

Siegmund was born in Graz, the son of Friedrich von Hausegger (1837-1899), a lawyer and writer on music. According to Siegmund's own account, Friedrich was "one of the first in Austria to recognize the greatness of Richard Wagner and to exert himself to the utmost in propagating his music and his ideas". According to one account, the young von Hausegger may have been made the vehicle of his critic-father's ideals. Siegmund studied music initially under his father, and a strong Wagnerian tinge is found in his own compositions, which included masses, operas and symphonic poems as well as many choruses and songs.

At the age of nineteen, von Hausegger composed a Mass for chorus and orchestra that he described as "my first serious composition". Originally intended to be performed at his college, the work proved too challenging for his fellow-pupils. His father helped him arrange a private performance before an invited audience. This event marked von Hausegger's debut both as a conductor and as a composer.

== Reputation ==
He was talked of in Austria and Germany in the first years of the 20th century as one of the next great talents after Strauss and Mahler, but despite several successes before the First World War his music was forgotten when his full-blooded post-Wagnerian style went out of fashion. In 1922 the German critic Adolf Weissmann wrote:

The symphonic poetry of Siegmund von Hausegger is full of Wagner. His work originates in a resolute will to truth and honesty, but outworn theory cripples his imagination.

== Conducting career ==
Hausegger conducted orchestras in many German and Austrian cities including Graz; Munich, where he shared the conductorship of the Kaim Orchestra with Felix Weingartner; Frankfurt (1904-6); Berlin (Blüthner Orchestra, 1910–15); and Hamburg (1910-20). After the First World War he served as conductor of the Scottish Orchestra in Glasgow and Edinburgh before returning to Munich as conductor of the Munich Philharmonic and president of the Munich Academy of Music. In 1920 he succeeded Max von Schillings as president of the Allgemeiner Deutscher Musikverein.

He was the first conductor to perform Anton Bruckner's Symphony No. 9 in its original form. The symphony had been posthumously premiered in a version which had been substantially edited by Ferdinand Löwe. Löwe had attempted to make the music more acceptable to the public by softening its abrupt modulations and climaxes and altering the phrasing to be more in the style of Wagner, whose music was popular with audiences. On 2 April 1932, Hausegger presented a concert in which the symphony was performed twice by the Munich Philharmonic; first in Löwe's version then using Bruckner's original autograph. Today the symphony is almost always presented in Bruckner's original form. Hausegger assisted Robert Haas and Alfred Orel in preparing the edition of Symphony published as Volume 9 of Anton Bruckner: Sämtliche Werke and he also made the first commercial recording of the symphony with the Munich Philharmonic in 1938 for His Master's Voice, using that edition. He retired from conducting in the same year. He died in Munich.

== Personal life ==
Hausegger was twice married: first in 1902 to Hertha Ritter, daughter of Franziska Wagner (the niece of both Richard Wagner and Alexander Ritter, the librettist of Richard Strauss's opera Feuersnot) and, after her death in 1913, to Helene von Bronsart.

== Works (selected list) ==
- Helfrid, opera (1890)
- Dionysische Phantasie for orchestra (1896–1897)
- Zinnober, opera (1897–1898)
- Barbarossa, symphonic poem (1898–1899)
- Mass (1899)
- Drei Hymnen an die Nacht, song cycle (1902)
- Wieland der Schmied, symphonic poem (1903)
- Requiem (1907)
- Natursymphonie for large orchestra with final chorus to words from Goethe's poem Prooemium (1911)
- Aufklänge, variations for orchestra on a children's song (1917)
