= Ferdinand Löwe =

Austrian conductor (1865–1925)

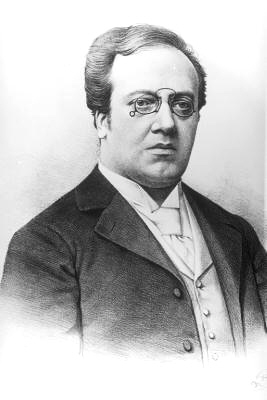

Ferdinand Löwe (19 February 1865 – 6 January 1925) was an Austrian conductor.

== Biography ==
Löwe was born in Vienna, Austrian Empire where along with Munich, Germany his career was primarily centered. From 1896 Löwe conducted the Kaim Orchestra, today's Munich Philharmonic, where he returned from 1908 to 1914. In 1900 Löwe founded and conducted the Wiener Concertvereinsorchester, today the Vienna Symphony. He taught at the Vienna Conservatoire from 1884. He was elected director in 1919 and served until 1922.

== Bruckner ==
A pupil of Anton Bruckner, Löwe was one of the main popularizers of Bruckner's symphonies. He would sometimes persuade the composer to rearrange his music in order to make it more palatable to the public. In the case of Bruckner's Symphony No. 9, Löwe himself made significant changes to the harmony, orchestration, phrasing and dynamics before the posthumous premiere. Bruckner's original conception of the symphony was not heard until 1932 when it was revived by Siegmund von Hausegger, Löwe's successor at Munich. The symphony is today performed without Löwe's changes.
