= Hans Winderstein =

German conductor and composer

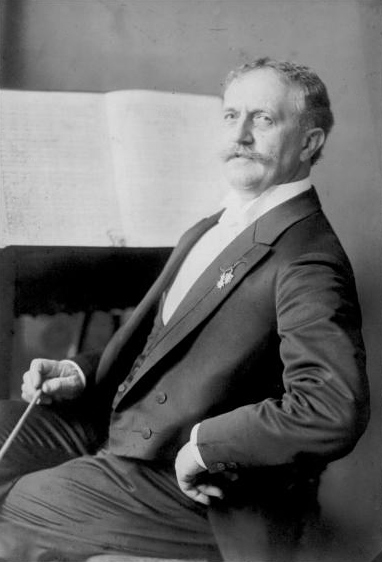
Winderstein portrayed by Nicola Perscheid

Hans Wilhelm Gustav Winderstein (29 October 1856 in Lüneburg, Hanover – 23 June 1925) was a German conductor and composer.

Winderstein studied from 1877 to 1880 at Leipzig Conservatoire, under Henry Schradieck and Fr. Hermann (violin), E. Fr. Richter and W. Rust (theory). He also played in the Leipzig Gewandhaus Orchestra. From 1880 to 1884, he led Baron von Derwies' private orchestra at Nice after which he was violin teacher at the Winterthur Conservatoire in Switzerland until 1887. He then conducted an orchestra at Nuremberg for three years. From 1890 to 1893 he conducted the concerts of the Philharmonic Societies of Nuremberg and Fürth. Between 1893 and 1896 Winderstein directed the newly established Kaim Orchestra. In Leipzig in 1896 he organized, the "Winderstein Orchestra." He conducted this group of 60 musicians continually until at least 1918.

Winderstein founded the philharmonic concerts at Leipzig and Halle, and made successful concert tours to other cities. From 1898 to 1899 he conducted the Leipzig "Singakademie."

His compositions for orchestra include Trauermarsch, Valse-Caprice, and Ständchen. Winderstein also wrote several works for violin and piano.
