= Fritz Rieger =

German conductor

Friedrich Edmund Rieger
- Fritz Rieger
- Born: June 28, 1910
- Died: September 30, 1978 (aged 68)
- Other names: Fritz

Friedrich Edmund "Fritz" Rieger (28 June 1910 – 30 September 1978) was a German conductor.

== Life ==
Rieger was born in Oberaltstadt, Karkonosze, Bohemia, Austria-Hungary. From 1931 to 1938 he worked in Prague. In August 1941 he became director of the Bremen Opera, and in August 1944 he took up the position of director of the Bremen Philharmonic Orchestra. Rieger was a member of the Nazi party.

In 1949 Rieger was announced as the chief conductor of the Munich Philharmonic Orchestra by the city government, replacing the modernist Hans Rosbaud who had been appointed by U.S. occupation authorities. According to author David Monod, the decision to release Rosbaud and replace him with the "young and relatively unknown but suitably conservative" Rieger was caused by a desire to attract larger audiences with more traditional programs, a necessity in the wake of currency reform in the western part of Germany. In 1952, Rieger announced that the orchestra would eliminate almost all modern music from its concerts. Rieger continued to lead the Munich orchestra until 1966.

Fritz Rieger was the chief conductor of the Melbourne Symphony Orchestra from 1968 to 1971.

He died in Bonn, Germany, on 30 September 1978.
