= Ulrich Tadday =

German musicologist

Ulrich Tadday (born 1963) is a German musicologist, a professor at the University of Bremen.

== Career ==
Born in Gelsenkirchen, Tadday studied musicology, music pedagogy, philosophy and German literature at the University of Dortmund and University of Bochum 1983 to 1988. He achieved a Ph.D in 1992 and completed his habilitation in 1998.

In 2002, Tadday was appointed professor of music history at the University of Bremen. He has been the sole editor of the quarterly Musik-Konzepte from 2004.

== Publications ==
Tadday's publications include:

- Die Anfänge des Musikfeuilletons: der kommunikative Gebrauchswert musikalischer Bildung in Deutschland um 1800. J. B. Metzler, Stuttgart 1993.
- Das schöne Unendliche. Ästhetik, Kritik, Geschichte der romantischen Musikanschauung. Metzler, Stuttgart/Weimar 1999, ISBN 978-3-476-01664-5.
- as editor: Schumann-Handbuch. Metzler / Bärenreiter, Stuttgart/Weimar/Kassel 2006, ISBN 978-3-476-01671-3.
