= Munich Philharmonic =

German symphony orchestra

- Orchestra
- Founded: 1893
- Concert hall: Isarphilharmonie
- Principal conductor: Lahav Shani
- Website: www.mphil.de

The Munich Philharmonic (German: Münchner Philharmoniker) is a German symphony orchestra located in the city of Munich. It is one of Munich's four principal orchestras, along with the Bavarian Radio Symphony Orchestra, the Munich Radio Orchestra and the Bavarian State Orchestra. Since 1985, the orchestra has been housed in the Gasteig culture centre.

== History ==
=== Foundation ===
The orchestra was founded in Munich in 1893 by Franz Kaim, son of a piano manufacturer, as the Kaim Orchestra. In 1895, it took up residence in the city's Tonhalle (concert hall). It soon attracted distinguished conductors: Gustav Mahler first directed the group in 1897 and premiered his Symphony No. 4 and Symphony No. 8 with the orchestra, while Bruno Walter directed the orchestra for the posthumous premiere of Mahler's Das Lied von der Erde. Felix Weingartner was music director from 1898 to 1905, and the young Wilhelm Furtwängler made his auspicious conducting debut there in 1906. Meanwhile, Anton Bruckner pupil Ferdinand Löwe established an enduring tradition of Bruckner performance which continues to this day.

=== The World Wars ===
Up until this time the orchestra, which by 1910 was known as the Munich Konzertverein Orchestra, was privately funded, but during World War I finances became tight and players were called for military service, forcing the orchestra to cease operation. After the war, the orchestra was taken over by the City of Munich and restarted under the leadership of composer Hans Pfitzner, soon replaced by Bruckner pioneer Siegmund von Hausegger. In 1928, the orchestra acquired its current name.

After the rise of the Nazi party in 1933, the orchestra had to mark its scores with swastikas and the words "The Orchestra of the capital of the Movement"(German: Orchester der Hauptstadt der Bewegung). In 1938, the pro-Nazi conductor Oswald Kabasta became chief conductor, raising its musical standards even as World War II began.

During the war, the Tonhalle was destroyed and the orchestra, without a permanent base, was suspended for a period. After the war, fortunes recovered under the music directors Hans Rosbaud and Rudolf Kempe. In 1979, Sergiu Celibidache took over, driving an increase in the orchestra's standards and public profile..

=== Recent history ===
After Celibidache's sudden death in 1996, James Levine was chief conductor of the orchestra from 1999 to 2004. Christian Thielemann became the orchestra's music director in September 2004, joined by Wouter Hoekstra as Intendant. However, in 2007, Hoekstra was dismissed from his post after reported disputes with Thielemann. In 2009, the orchestra announced the scheduled conclusion of Thielemann's tenure in 2011. Thielemann's demand to have a say over the choice of guest conductors was not approved.

In March 2010, Lorin Maazel was named the orchestra's next chief conductor, effective with the 2012–2013 season. Early in 2014, Maazel cancelled concert engagements as a result of ill health. Subsequently, in June 2014, he announced his resignation as music director of the Munich Philharmonic, with immediate effect.

In January 2013, the orchestra announced the appointment of Valery Gergiev as its next principal conductor as of 2015, with an initial contract through 2020. Gergiev was dismissed in 2022 after Gergiev declined to repudiate Putin's 2022 Russian invasion of Ukraine.

In March 2022, Lahav Shani first guest-conducted the orchestra, in a benefit concert for Ukraine. Shani returned in September 2022 for an additional guest-conducting appearance. In February 2023, the orchestra and the Munich City Council announced the appointment of Shani as its next chief conductor, with an initial contract of 5 years.

In September 2025, the Flanders Festival Ghent cancelled a planned concert by the Munich Philharmonic under conductor Lahav Shani, citing his role as music director of the Israel Philharmonic. Festival organizers stated that Shani had not clearly distanced himself from what they described as a "genocidal regime" in Israel and therefore chose not to collaborate with him. Commentators and politicians accused the festival of "naked antisemitism". The Belgian Prime Minister demanded the resignation of the Festivals Chairman and attended a concert by the Munich Philharmonic to express his solidarity with Lahav Shani. Subsequently, the German President, Frank-Walter Steinmeier, invited Shani to Berlin.

Over the course of its history, the Munich Philharmonic has performed premieres of Günter Bialas, Anton Bruckner, Harald Genzmer, Luigi Nono, Gustav Mahler and others.

== Chief conductors ==
- Hans Winderstein (1893–1895)
- Hermann Zumpe (1893–1895)
- Ferdinand Löwe (1897–1898)
- Felix Weingartner (1898–1905)
- Georg Schnéevoigt (1898–1905)
- Ferdinand Löwe (1908–1914)
- Hans Pfitzner (1919–1920)
- Siegmund von Hausegger (1920–1938)
- Oswald Kabasta (1938–1944)
- Hans Rosbaud (1945–1948)
- Fritz Rieger (1949–1966)
- Rudolf Kempe (1967–1976)
- Sergiu Celibidache (1979–1996)
- James Levine (1999–2004)
- Christian Thielemann (2004–2011)
- Lorin Maazel (2012–2014)
- Valery Gergiev (2015–2022)
- Lahav Shani (2026–present)

=== Honorary conductors ===
- Zubin Mehta (2004–present)

== See also ==
- Category:Music commissioned by the Munich Philharmonic (1)
