= Nicola Samale =

Italian composer (born 1941)

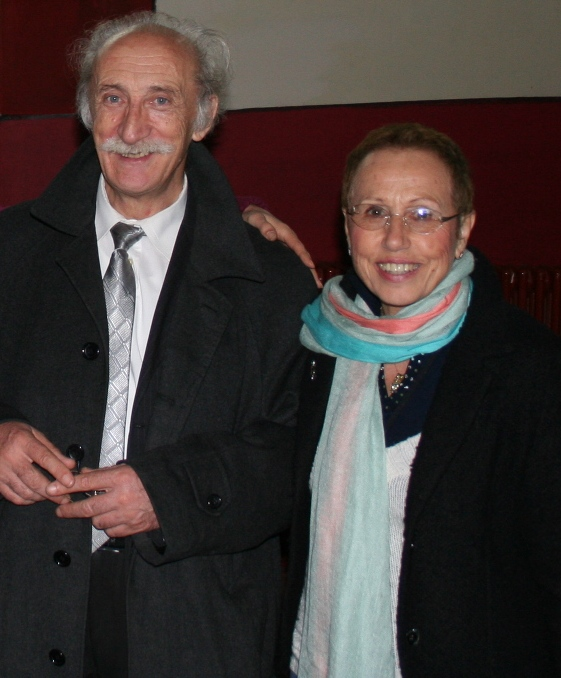
- Nicola Samale with Edda Dell'Orso in 2010
- Born: 14 September 1941 (age 83); Castelnuovo d'Istria, Italy (now Podgrad, Slovenia)
- Occupation(s): Composer, conductor

Nicola Samale (born 14 September 1941) is an Italian composer and conductor.

== Biography ==
Nicola Samale studied 1959–72 at the Conservatorio di Santa Cecilia, Rome, Flute (Diploma 1963) Conducting (with Franco Ferrara, Diploma 1970), Composition as well as Instrumentation (Diploma 1972). He refined his conducting in classes with John Barbirolli (1964) and Hermann Scherchen (1965). Still in his studies, he won several conducting competitions, in particular 1968 in Florence (1st prize), 1969 at La Scala, Milan (2nd prize), 1969 the Respighi Competition in Venice (1st prize) and 1970 the RAI Competition in Rome (1st prize). Samale works as a composer and conductor. He appeared with almost all Italian orchestras and at Italian opera houses, furthermore in Bucharest, Frankfurt, Grenoble, Johannesburg, Katowice, Ljubljana, London, Mannheim, Miami, Paris, Pretoria, and Stuttgart. Samale was Principal Guest Conductor of the Sinfonica Abruzzese (1984–88), Artistic Director and Chief Conductor of the Orchestra Sinfonica di Lecce (1993–94) and the Gran Orchestra Sinfonica di Montescaglioso in provincia di Matera (1997–2000) as well as Artistic Director of the Orchestra Sinfonica di Catanzaro (2003–04). From 1978 to 1993 he was also professor for conducting at the Conservatory of L'Aquila.

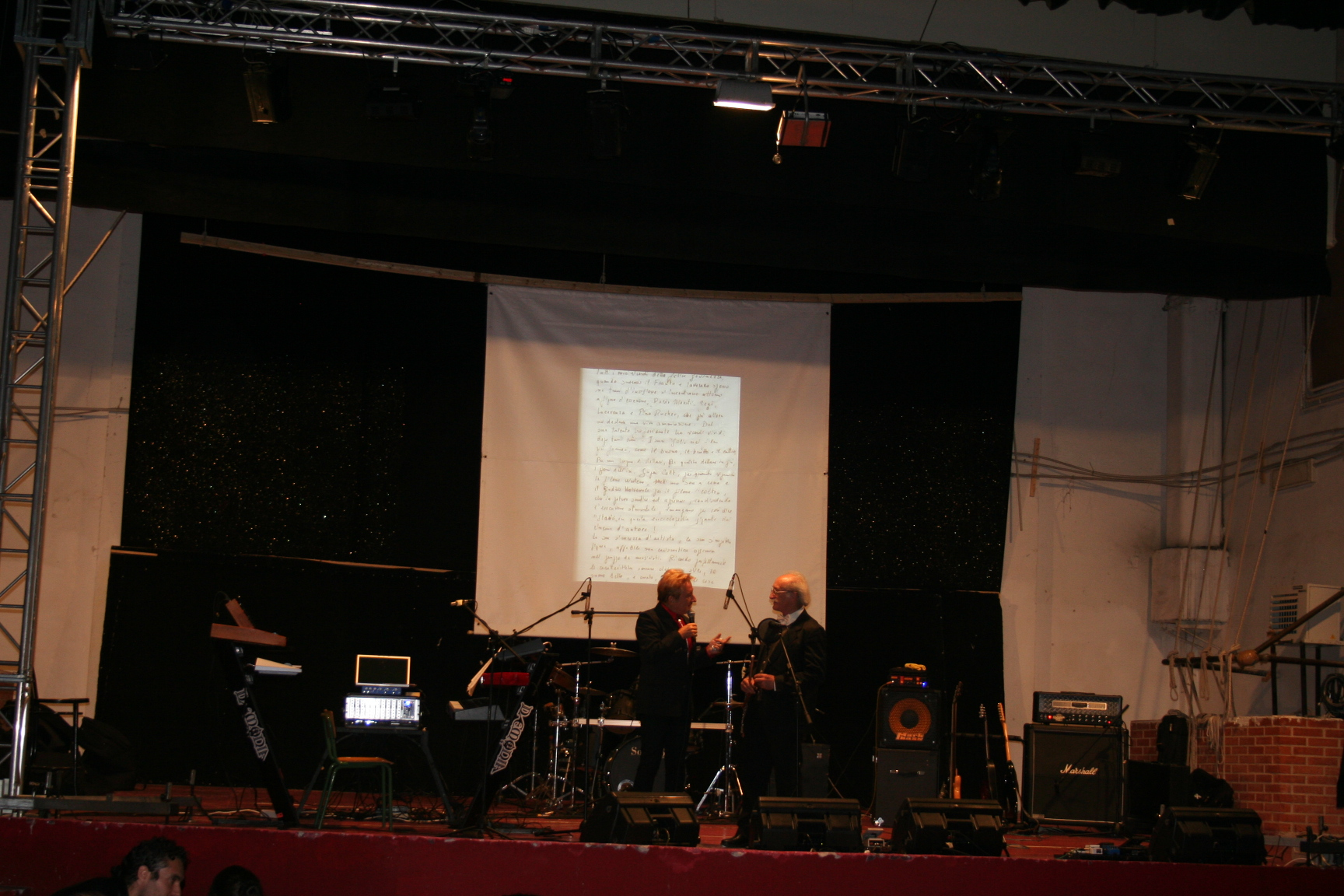
Soundtracks – A tribute to Pino Rucher. The music critic Dario Salvatori introduces composer and orchestra conductor Nicola Samale (flute soloist in The Good, the Bad and the Ugly).

On 16 October 2010 Nicola Samale took part in the event Soundtracks – A tribute to Pino Rucher. The event was sponsored by the Municipal Authorities of San Nicandro Garganico and Manfredonia.
Nicola Samale lives in Ailano.

== Works ==
Nicola Samale composed chamber, orchestral and vocal music as well as five operas. He worked both for pop music and classical music, for example he conducted the R.C.A Orchestra for the Italian singer Renato Zero in the LP No, mamma, no! in 1973. In collaboration with the composer Giuseppe Mazzuca he also wrote numerous works, including some film soundtracks, and in particular the first version of the Ricostruzione of the unfinished Finale of Bruckner's Ninth Symphony (First performance: Radio-Sinfonie-Orchester Berlin, Peter Gülke, 1986; first CD release: Radiosinfonieorchester Frankfurt, Eliahu Inbal, Teldec 1986). This Performing Version, further developed in collaboration with John A. Phillips and Benjamin-Gunnar Cohrs (1986–2011) made him known to a larger audience. Also of particular interest is his completion of an unfinished orchestral arrangement of Liszt's Hexaméron (Variations on the march from I Puritani of Vincenzo Bellini; first performance: 2001, Catania, Orchestra Teatro M. V. Bellini, Donato Renzetti), his completed performing version of Mahler's Tenth Symphony (with Giuseppe Mazzuca; first performance: 2001, Perugia, Vienna Symphony Orchestra, Martin Sieghart) as well as his completion of the Scherzo from the Unfinished Symphony by Schubert (1988; first performance: 1988, Bari, Orchestra Sinfonica di Bari, Nicola Samale; revised version 2004 with Benjamin-Gunnar Cohrs; first performance: 2004, Sarajevo, Sarajevo Symphony Orchestra, Benjamin-Gunnar Cohrs). His composition Miracolo a Milano recently played an important role in the German movie Drei by Tom Tykwer (Germany, 2010).

== Selected compositions ==
=== Opera ===
- 67 A.D. (1994–97)
- Il principe sognatore (1997–99)
- L' eroico Yi Sun Sin (2000)
- Il Castello – L'onore dei Morra (1999–2002)
- L'ultima messa (2004–06)
- Fichi d'India (2011)

=== Orchestral music ===
- Suite lirica No. 1
- Racconti Viennesi Caleidoscopio
- Poema Sinfonico Magica notte on Italian Christmas carols (2004)
- Capriccio (Clarinet and Orchestra)
- Ouverture sinfonica Gaia scienza (Band)
- Poema sinfonico Ionica (Band)
- Elegia e Finale (String Orchestra)

=== Vocal music ===
- Ave Maria (Soli, Choir and Orchestra)
- Inno a Padre Pio (Choir and Orchestra)
- 99 in memoriam (melologo) (Narrator and Chamber-Ensemble)
- Plenum (Choir and Chamber Orchestra)
- Unheimlich (unacc. Choir)
- Miracolo a Milano (unacc. Choir)

=== Chamber music ===
- Burlesca (Cembalo)
- Diorama (Wind Quintet)
- Divertimento (Wind Quintet)
- Hermes (Oboe, 4 Horns, Solo-Horn, Piano and Doublebass)
- Il futuro mancato (Narrator and Chamber-Ensemble)
- Libaeralia (Soprano, Narrator and Chamber-Ensemble)
- Pentalfa 14 (Flute, Alphorn and Percussion)
- Suite Lirica (No. 2), arranged from Italian arias (Wind Octet)

=== Arrangements / Orchestrations ===
- Anton Bruckner, Ninth Symphony, Finale, completed performing version (with Giuseppe Mazzuca, John A. Phillips and Benjamin-Gunnar Cohrs, 1985–2011)
- Pablo Casals, Inno alle Nazioni Unite, arrangement for orchestra (1996)
- Franz Liszt, Hexaméron, completed arrangement for orchestra (2001)
- Franz Liszt, Sonata in b minor, arrangement for orchestra (2007)
- Gustav Mahler, Tenth Symphony, completed performing version (with Giuseppe Mazzuca; 1st version: 2001)
- Franz Schubert, Scherzo from the Unfinished Symphony, completed performing version (1988; revised version 2004 with Cohrs; first performance: 2004, Sarajevo, Sarajevo Symphony Orchestra, Benjamin-Gunnar Cohrs)
