= Heinz-Klaus Metzger =

German music critic and theorist

Heinz-Klaus Metzger (6 February 1932 – 25 October 2009) was a German music critic and theorist.

Born in Konstanz, Metzger studied piano under Carl Seemann in Freiburg im Breisgau and composition under Max Deutsch in Paris. Later, he met Theodor W. Adorno, Edgard Varèse, Karlheinz Stockhausen and Luigi Nono at the Darmstadt International Summer Courses for New Music. Here he found his role as a notable theoretician and proponent of serialism in musical theory. He participated as a distinguished contributor to a series of important texts in the journal Die Reihe. Metzger was among the first critics to promote Stockhausen's music, but was soon a substantial critic of Stockhausen's compositional development.

In the 1960s, Metzger was one of the first European commentators on John Cage, and spokesman of "compositional anarchy", which resulted in the Kölner Manifest of 1960, and serving as a copy editor of the magazine Collage in Palermo. From 1965 until 1969 he worked as a music critic for the magazine Die Weltwoche in Zürich. In 1969, he founded, together with his partner, composer and conductor Rainer Riehn, the Ensemble Musica Negativa, where they embraced the performance of radical new music. In 1987, Metzger and Riehn became the chief dramatic advisors of the Oper Frankfurt under Gary Bertini. During their tenure, Oper Frankfurt commissioned and premiered John Cage's Europeras I and II.

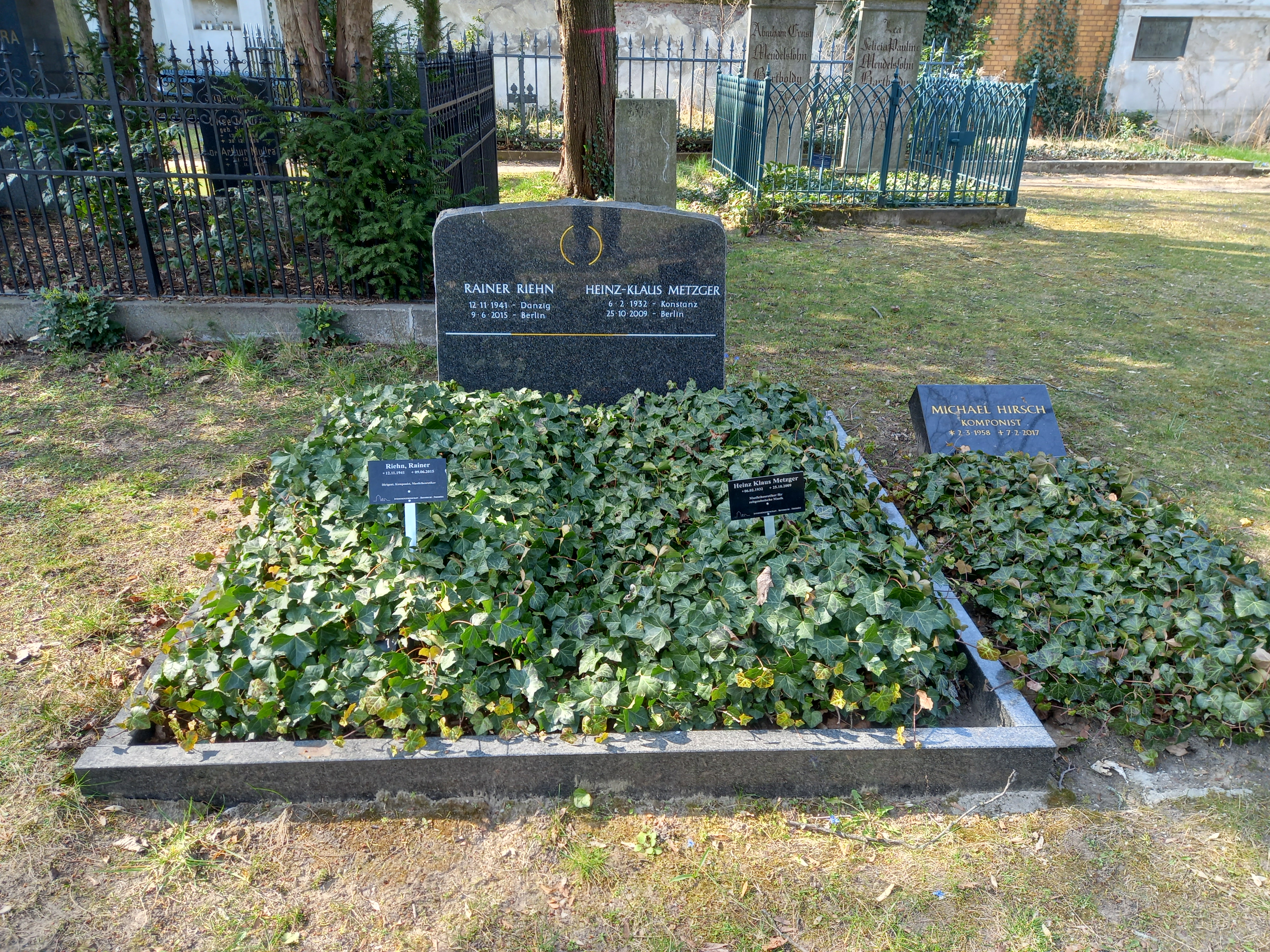
Grave of Riehn and Metzger, Berlin

From 1977 to 2002, Metzger and Riehn founded, edited, researched, and provided texts criticism for the musicology series Musik-Konzepte (Concepts of music); for this they received the Deutscher Kritikerpreis (German critics prize) in 1983. Also, they edited the two first volumes of the compositions of Adorno. Metzger has received honorary doctorates from the Berlin University of the Arts and from the University of Palermo.

Metzger died in Berlin in 2009 at the age of 77.

== Works ==
- Musik wozu. Literatur zu Noten, with Rainer Riehn, Frankfurt a.M.: Suhrkamp 1980
- Die freigelassene Musik. Schriften zu John Cage, Rainer Riehn and Florian Neuner (editors), Wien: Klever Verlag 2012
