= Rainer Riehn =

German composer and music conductor

Rainer Riehn (12 November 1941 – 9 June 2015) was a German composer and conductor, and a co-editor of music theory magazines.

Riehn was born in Danzig, Germany (modern Gdańsk, Poland) studied music theory in Mainz, Zürich, and Berlin and composition with Gottfried Michael Koenig in Utrecht. He met the music theorist Heinz-Klaus Metzger at the Darmstädter Ferienkurse in the summer of 1965. In 1968 he founded the Ensemble Musica Negativa, in 1977 the series Musik-Konzepte, which he published until 2003 (together with Heinz-Klaus Metzger). In 1984 Metzger and Riehn received the Deutscher Kritikerpreis as editors of the Musik-Konzepte. In 1987 he was chief dramaturge at the Oper Frankfurt together with Heinz-Klaus Metzger, and initiated the first commission for an opera composition for John Cage (Europeras 1 & 2).

== Works ==
- Les Chants de Maldoror, electronic composition, realized in Utrecht about a poetic novel Les Chants de Maldoror by the Comte de Lautréamont
- Das Lied von der Erde, a work of six songs by Gustav Mahler, arrangement for chamber ensemble by Arnold Schoenberg, finished by Rainer Riehn (premiere by Ensemble Musica Negativa, Toblach 1983)
- nichts – als das Kinderspiel eines Erwachsenen, string trio (premiere by trio recherche, Konstanz 2002)
