= Hermann Zumpe =

German conductor and composer

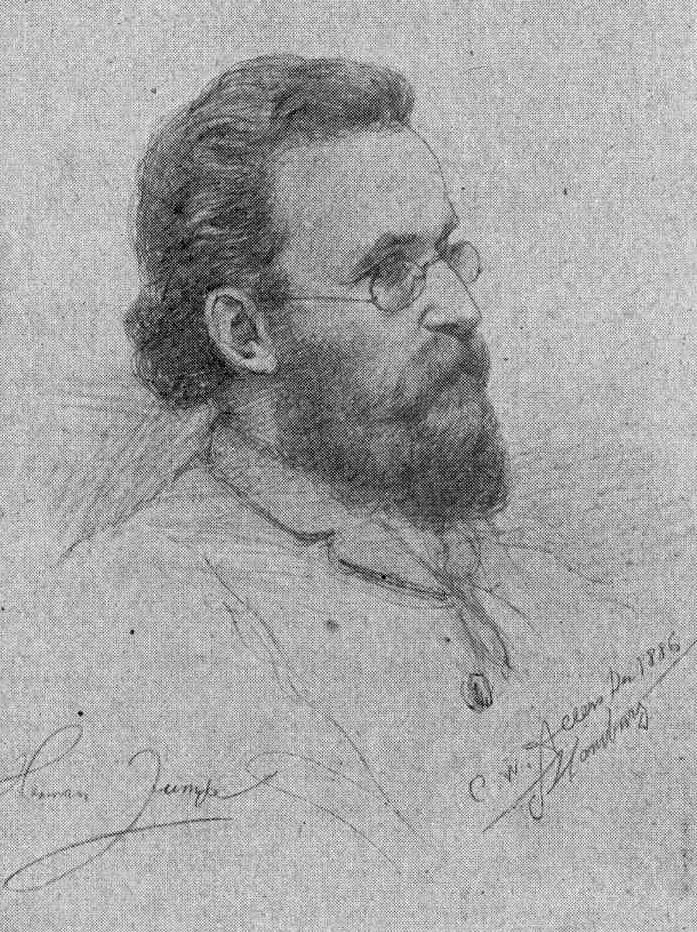
- Hermann Zumpe (1886), by Christian Wilhelm Allers

Background information
- Born: 9 April 1850; Oppach, Saxony, German Confederation
- Died: 4 September 1903 (aged 53) Munich, Bavaria, Germany
- Occupations: Conductor, composer

Hermann Zumpe (9 April 1850 – 4 September 1903) was a German conductor and composer.

== Biography ==
Born in Oppach, Saxony, Zumpe grew up in Taubenheim in Sohland an der Spree. He was educated at the teachers' seminary at Bautzen, was a schoolmaster at Weigsdorf in Cunewalde from 1870 to 1871, from thence going to Leipzig, and playing the triangle in the municipal theatre there. He was one of those who helped Richard Wagner in the preparation of the Ring cycle at the Bayreuth Festspielhaus in the years 1873 to 1875, and after this he conducted in the theatres of Salzburg, Würzburg, Magdeburg, Frankfurt, and Hamburg (1884 to 1886). In 1891 he went to Stuttgart as Hofkapellmeister, taking over the conductorship of the Society for Classical Church Music, in lieu of Immanuel Faisst, who was ill. In 1895 he became conductor of the Kaim Orchestra (the later Munich Philharmonic, and was made Hofkapellmeister in Schwerin in 1897. He visited London to conduct Wagner performances at the Royal Opera House, Covent Garden, in 1898. In 1900 he received the most important appointment of his career, that of Hofkapellmeister in Munich, directing what would later become the Bavarian State Opera. Here he was especially active in directing the famous Wagner performances at the Prinzregententheater up to 1903, in which year, on 4 September, he died suddenly, aged 53.

Among his compositions were: a fairy opera, Anhana (Berlin, 1880), Die verwunschene Prinzessin, operettas Farinelli (Hamburg, 1886), Karin (Hamburg, 1888), and Polnische Wirtschaft (Berlin, 1891). At his death the score of another opera, Sâwitri, der Königstochter, was found incomplete and was scored by Gustav von Rössler, and produced at Schwerin.
