= Deutscher Kritikerpreis =

Former German cultural prize

Deutscher Kritikerpreis was a cultural prize awarded annually by the Association of German Critics (Verband der Deutschen Kritiker e.V.) from 1951 to 2009.

This award was given for outstanding contributions in the fields of architecture, the fine arts, television, film, radio, literature, music, dance and theater. According to the guidelines of the Association, "the undiscovered, too little appreciated or a life's work" ("das noch Unentdeckte, zu wenig Gewürdigte oder ein Lebenswerk") had to be emphasized as far as possible. The award was discontinued with the dissolution of the Association in 2010.
