= Mass No. 3 (Bruckner) =

Piece of music by Anton Bruckner

- by Anton Bruckner
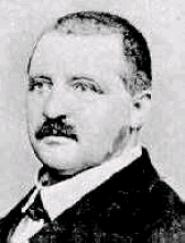
- The composer, c. 1860
- Key: F minor
- Catalogue: WAB 28
- Form: Mass
- Composed: 1867–1868: Linz
- Dedication: Anton Ritter von Imhof-Geißlinghof
- Performed: 16 June 1872: Augustinerkirche, Vienna
- Movements: 6
- Vocal: SATB choir and soloists
- Instrumental: orchestra and organ ad lib.

The Mass No. 3 in F minor, WAB 28, is a setting of the mass ordinary for vocal soloists, chorus and orchestra, and organ ad libitum, that Anton Bruckner composed in 1867–1868.

== History ==
After the 1867 success of his Mass No. 1 in D minor, Bruckner was commissioned "to write a new Mass for the Burgkapelle". Bruckner wrote the first version between Septembers 1867–1868 in Linz (just before his move to Vienna).

The first rehearsals, conducted by Johann Herbeck at the court church, the Augustinerkirche, took place in 1868 or 1869, but "were badly attended by orchestral players" and were "generally unsuccessful". Ultimately, Herbeck found the mass "too long and unsingable". After various delays, the mass was finally premiered on June 16, 1872, at the Augustinerkirche, with Bruckner himself conducting. Herbeck changed his opinion of the piece, claiming to know only two masses: this one and Beethoven's Missa solemnis. Franz Liszt and even Eduard Hanslick praised the piece. A second performance occurred in the Hofmusikkapelle on 8 December 1873. The manuscript is archived at the Austrian National Library.

After the third performance (30 July 1876), Bruckner made slight revisions on the "Kyrie" and the "Gloria", and in 1877 on the "Credo". He made a further revision on the "Credo" in 1881, in preparation for performances at the Hofkapelle, mainly to address "difficulties of execution", but also to take into account what he had learned from studying Mozart's Requiem, correcting some instances of parallel octaves if not justified by Mozart's example. In some later performances, Bruckner was in the organ loft rather than on the podium.

In a letter to Siegfried Ochs of 14 April 1895, the composer wrote:

Der Bruckner wird alt und möchte doch so gern noch die F-Moll '[Messe]' hören! Bitte, bitte! Das wäre der Höhepunkt meines Lebens. Aber dann manches anders als die Partitur! Bei Des-Dur im Credo: 'Deum vero de Deo' bitte 'Organo pleno'! Nicht Register sparen!
Translation: Bruckner is growing old and would very much like to live to hear the F minor [Mass]! Please, please! That would be the climax of my life. But then much is to be different from the score! In the D♭ major of the Credo: Deum verum de Deo, please, Organo Pleno! Spare not on the registers!.

In the 1890s Bruckner was still revising the work, but there were very few changes made to the vocal parts after 1868. At a November 1893 performance of this mass, Johannes Brahms "applauded ... so enthusiastically ... that Bruckner personally thanked him".

The composer dedicated the piece to Hofrat Anton Ritter von Imhof-Geißlinghof at "the last minute". Leopold Nowak, however, believed that the piece was actually dedicated to conductor Johann Herbeck.

== Versions and editions ==
Bruckner made successive revisions to the work, in 1876, 1877, 1881 and from 1890 to 1893.

- First edition (Doblinger, 1894), revised by Joseph Schalk; re-edition by Wöss (1924)
- Haas edition (1944, 1952)
- Nowak edition (1960)
- Hans Ferdinand Redlich (Eulenburg, 1967)
- Hawkshaw new edition (2005)

The first edition of 1894 contained "numerous spurious performance directions and articulations as well as massive reorchestration, particularly of the winds". Bruckner was angry when he saw it in print, and annotated instances of parallel octaves, which he had eliminated in his own revisions.

In 1944, Robert Haas put out an edition as part of the Gesamtausgabe, which was superseded by Leopold Nowak's edition of 1960, and again more recently by Paul Hawkshaw's of 2005. These three editors had access to various manuscripts and contemporary copies. Hans Ferdinand Redlich, on the other hand, did not for his Eulenburg edition, and complained of being denied access by Nowak.

In the current Gesamtausgabe by Paul Hawkshaw the two versions, which Bruckner considered to be the definitive ones, those of 1883 and 1893, are presented, so that the performers are provided with the opportunity to choose between the two versions.

== Setting ==
The work is set for SATB choir and soloists, and orchestra (2 flutes, 2 oboes, 2 clarinets in B♭, 2 bassoons, 2 horns in F, 2 horns in B♭, 2 trumpets in C, alto, tenor and bass trombones, timpani, and strings), and organ ad libitum.

The organ, present in the Wöss edition, is absent in the Haas edition, and put "ad libitum" in the current Gesamtausgabe. "The organ serves first of all to accentuate significant passages, in order to increase their sound brightness."

The work is divided into six parts:

1. Kyrie – Moderato, F minor
2. Gloria – Allegro, C major
3. Credo – Allegro, C major
4. Sanctus – Moderato, F major
5. Benedictus – Allegro moderato, A♭ major
6. Agnus Dei – Andante, F minor veering to F major

Total duration: about 62 minutes

The "Gloria" starts out with the words "Gloria in excelsis Deo" and the "Credo" with the words "Credo in unum Deum" sung by the whole choir, rather than intoned in Gregorian mode by a soloist, as in Bruckner's previous masses. The setting is more symphonic than that of the Mass No. 1, with a larger contribution of the soloists. Bruckner indicated bars 170–179 of the "Gloria" – a part of the last "Miserere nobis" – as optional. As yet, these ten bars were recorded by only a few conductors. Whereas the "Gloria" ends with a fugue in all Bruckner's masses, in Mass No. 3, as in his previous Missa solemnis, the "Credo" also ends with a fugue, a "classical feature". In this fugue the next voice entry is preceded by the acclamation "Credo, credo" sustained by the organ. The theme of the "Agnus Dei" has some reminiscence of that of the Missa solemnis. The "Dona nobis" resumes the theme of the "Kyrie" in major mode, and recalls the fugue subject of the "Gloria" and the last phrase of the "Credo".

The composition of the Mass in F minor may have been influenced by Schubert's late Mass No. 5 in A♭ major and Mass No. 6 in E♭ major.

=== Notes ===
- Bruckner's Symphony No. 2 quotes both the "Kyrie" in its finale, and the "Benedictus" in its Adagio.
- The Adagio of Symphony No. 9, bar 139, quotes also the "Kyrie" call by the oboe.

== Selected discography ==
At least 89 recordings of Mass No. 3 have been issued and are listed at the Roelofs Bruckner Discography after an exhaustive discussion.

The first complete recording of the mass was by Maurice Kessler with the Oberlin Musical Union and the Conservatory Orchestra of Cleveland in 1949. Of the other recordings from the LP era, Eugen Jochum's recording with the Bavarian Radio Symphony Orchestra and Choir on Deutsche Grammophon, and Karl Forster's with the Berliner Symphoniker and the Chorus of the St. Hedwigs-Kathedrale have been remastered to CD. According to Hans Roelofs, Jochum's and Forster's belong to the better recordings of the mass.

Matthew Best's more recent recording with the Corydon Singers has been critically acclaimed, particularly for Best's not toning down "the Wagnerian element in the gorgeous Benedictus". Franz Anton Krager's 2013 recording with the Houston Symphony Chorus is a good example of substantial pipe organ being used to reinforce the chorus and orchestra tutti sections of the Mass.

Other excellent recordings, according to Hans Roelofs, are that by i.a. Karl Richter (Schalk first edition), Lovro von Matačić, Colin Davis, Heinz Rögner and Franz Welser-Möst, and the more recent recordings by Ricardo Luna, Robin Ticciati and Gerd Schaller.
The recording under Davis (1988) is one of the best of the Third Mass. Interpretatively as well as sonically, this is a great recording in which care and emotion are balanced.
Luna's recording (2008) shows a different side of Bruckner's score. It is not a serene mind that is making music here, but someone who is overflowing with energy. An 'exciting' recording of the Third Mass.
The live recording under Ticciati (2013) breathes a different spirit: restraint is a salient feature here; moreover, the score is subtly implemented again and again. A nicely balanced performance.
Schaller's recording (2015) is sonically clear and present. A successful recording, in which the cliffs of church acoustics could be largely circumnavigated.

- Eugen Jochum, Bavarian Radio Symphony Orchestra and Choir, Anton Nowakowski (organ) – LP: DG 18829 – CD: DG 423 127-2 (Box set of 4 CDs), 1962 (Haas edition)
- Karl Forster, Berliner Symphoniker und Chor der St. Hedwigs-Kathedrale – LP: Electrola E/STE 80715 – CD: EMI 697-252 180-2 (Box of 3 CDs), 1962 (Haas edition)
- Karl Richter, Singverein der Gesellschaft der Musikfreunde and Tonkünstlerorchester, Vienna – CD: Kapellmeister KMS-064, 1974 (Schalk first edition, with the optional bars 170–179 of the "Gloria")
- Lovro von Matačić, Philharmonia Chorus and Orchestra – CD: Premiere Opera 4286, Live Royal Festival Hall London, 8 March 1981 – with Dvořák's Te Deum. NB: A curiosity about this recording is that the incipit of the Gloria and Credo is intoned by a soloist – as in Bruckner's earlier Masses – before the choir is going on.
- Colin Davis, Bavarian Radio Symphony Orchestra and Choir, Elmar Schloter (organ) – CD: Philips 422 358-2, 1988 (with the optional bars 170–179 of the "Gloria")
- Heinz Rögner, Rundfunkchor Berlin and RSO Berlin – CD: Ars Vivendi 2100 173, 1988
- Matthew Best, Corydon Singers and Orchestra – CD: Hyperion CDA 66599, 1992 (with Psalm 150).
- Franz Welser-Möst, London Philharmonic Orchestra and Linzer Mozart-Chor – CD: EMI CDC5 56168 2, 1995 (Nowak edition, with the optional bars 170–179 of the "Gloria")
- Ricardo Luna, Wiener Madrigalchor, Chorvereinigung Schola Cantorum and Symphonic orchestra of the Wiener Volksoper, István Mátiás (organ) – CD issued by the Wiener Madrigalchor: WMCH 024, 2008. Live premiere of the 1883 version, (Hawkshaw ed.) – with the Te Deum
- Robin Ticciati, Chor des Bayerischen Rundfunks and Bamberger Symphoniker – CD: Tudor 7193, 2013 (live)
- Franz Anton Krager & Michelle Perrin Blair, Houston Symphony Chorus, Moores School Orchestra and Sigurd Øgaard (organ), Anton Bruckner: Symphonisches Praeludium, Mass No. 3 in F minor, Postludium Organ Improvisation – CD/BD: abruckner.com BSVD 0116, 2013 (with the optional bars 170–179 of the "Gloria") – with Ave Maria, WAB 7 as offertorium
- Gerd Schaller, Bruckner – Mass 3, Psalm 146, Organ works, Philharmonischer Chor München and Philharmonie Festiva, CD: Profil Hänssler PH16034, 2016.
- Karsten Storck, Anton Bruckner – Messe f-Moll, Chöre am Hohen Dom zu Mainz, Mainzer Domorchester, Daniel Beckmann (organ) – CD: Rondeau ROP6161, 2018 (1893 version)
