= Psalm 146 (Bruckner) =

Psalm setting

- by Anton Bruckner
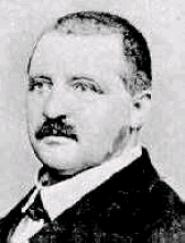
- The composer, c. 1860
- Key: A major
- Catalogue: WAB 37
- Form: Psalm setting
- Composed: c. 1850–c. 1856: St. Florian & Linz
- Performed: 28 November 1971: Nürnberg
- Published: 1996
- Recorded: May 1972
- Movements: 6
- Vocal: SSAATTBB choir and SATB soloists
- Instrumental: Orchestra

Psalm 146 in A major (WAB 37) by Anton Bruckner is a psalm setting for double mixed choir, soloists and orchestra. It is a setting of verses 1 to 11 of a German version of Psalm 147, which is Psalm 146 in the Vulgata.

== History ==
It is not known what occasion prompted Bruckner to compose this large-scale work or whether there was any performance in Bruckner's lifetime. The composition was presumably initiated during the St. Florian period (c. 1850) and completed in c. 1856 (at the latest 1858) in Linz, when Bruckner was studying with Simon Sechter.

When it was written, for whom, and why it was allowed to languish unperformed are all unanswered questions. Its cantata-like structure ... and stylistic affinity with the Missa solemnis place it in the late St. Florian years, though its enormous dimensions ... are difficult to reconcile with the resources of the monastery.

A sketch of the work is stored in the archive of Wels. An incomplete manuscript and a completed copy with annotations are stored in the archive of the Österreichische Nationalbibliothek. A critical edition was published by Paul Hawkshaw in 1996 in Band XX/4 of the Gesamtausgabe.

The first performance of Bruckner's Psalm 146 by Wolfgang Riedelbauch with the Hans-Sachs-Chor, the Lehrergesangverein Nürnberg and the Nürnberger Symphoniker occurred in the Meistersingerhalle of Nürnberg on 28 November 1971. Six months later another performance by the same ensembles was recorded in the Colosseum-Studio and put on LP. Other performances occurred in May 1975.

A second wave of performances occurred about twenty years later by Heinz Wallberg with the Niederösterreichiches Tonkünstler Orchester, the choir of the Wirtschaftsuniversität Wien and the Kammerchor der Musikhochschule Wien, first in Vienna on 8, 10 and 11 November 1991 and on 13 November in Baden near Vienna.
About three years later, the American premiere occurred on 13 January 1995 in the Alice Tully Hall by Leon Botstein with the American Symphony Orchestra and the Canticum Novum Singers. The American premiere used the score prepared by Hawkshaw for the Bruckner's Gesamtausgabe.

Twenty years later, during the 25th Ebrach Summer Music Festival, a next performance by Gerd Schaller with the Philharmonie Festiva orchestra and the Philharmonic Choir of Munich occurred on 6 September 2015. Schaller's live performance is put on CD by Profil Hänssler.

During the Brucknertage 2023 in St. Florian, Psalm 146 was performed on 18 and 19 August by Rémy Ballot with the Altomonte Orchester and the St. Florianer Chorakademie.
Celebrating Bruckner's bicentennial 2024, Psalm 146 was performed on 7 June 2024 by Franz Anton Krager conducting the Texas Music Festival Orchestra & Chorus in the Moores Opera House Houston TX.
Psalm 146 was also be performed by Christian Ciucă with the Summerchoir 2024 and organ accompaniment on 19 july 2024 in the Biserica Neagră of Brașov, and on 20 July 2024 in the Ateneul Român of Bucharest, Romania.

Recordings of Wallberg's, Botstein's and Ciucă's live performances are available in the Bruckner archive.

== Text ==
Lob Gottes wegen seiner Wohlthaten (Praise God for his well-doings)

1. Alleluja! Lobet den Herrn; denn lobsingen ist gut: liebliches und zierliches Lob sey unserm Gott!
2. Der Herr bauet Jerusalem, versammelt die Zerstreuten von Israel.
3. Er heilet, die geschlagenen Herzens sind, und verbindet ihre Wunden.
4. Er zählet die Menge der Sterne, und benennet sie Alle mit Namen.
5. Groß ist unser Herr, und groß seine Macht, und seiner Weisheit ist kein Maaß.
6. Der Herr nimmt auf die Sanften, und demüthigt die Sünder bis zur Erde.
7. Singet dem Herrn mit Danksagung: lobsinget unserm Gott mit der Harfe.
8. Er decket den Himmel mit Wolken, und bereitet Regen der Erde. Er läßt Gras wachsen auf den Bergen, und Kräuter zum Dienste der Menschen.
9. Er gibt dem Vieh seine Speise, und den jungen Raben, die zu ihm rufen.
10. Er hat nicht Lust an der Stärke des Rosses, noch Wohlgefallen an den Beinen des Mannes.
11. Der Herr hat Wohlgefallen an denen, die ihn fürchten, und an denen, die auf seine Barmherzigkeit hoffen.

== Setting ==
Psalm 146 is the largest of Bruckner's psalm settings. The 652-bar long work in A major is scored for SSAATTBB choir and SATB soloists and orchestra (1 flute, 2 oboes, 2 clarinets, 2 bassoons, 4 horns, 2 trumpets, 4 trombones, timpani and strings). The work (total duration about 30 minutes) is divided into six parts:

1. Introduction: "Alleluja! Lobet den Herrn". Langsam, A major – Choir with soprano soloist and solo horn
2. Recitative: F♯ minor veering to D major
  1. "Der Herr bauet Jerusalem". Kräftig – Bass soloist and trombones
  2. "Er heilet die geschlagenen Herzens sind". Weich – Soprano soloist and horns
  3. "Er zählet die Menge der Sterne". Frisch – Tenor soloist and woodwinds (oboes & bassoons)
3. Choir: "Groß ist unser Herr". Schnell, D minor veering to D major – Double choir in antiphony
4. Arioso with Choir:
  1. Arioso: "Der Herr nimmt auf die Sanften". Nicht zu langsam, B♭ major – Soprano, tenor and alto soloists, with solo oboe and violin
  2. Choir: "Singet dem Herrn mit Danksagung". Etwas bewegter, E♭ major
  3. Bridging arioso:
    1. "Er läßt Gras wachsen auf den Bergen" – Soprano soloist
    2. "Er gibt dem Vieh seine Speise" – Tenor soloist with solo clarinet
    3. "Er hat nicht Lust an der Stärke des Rosses" – Bass soloist with solo bassoon, veering to E minor
5. Arioso: "Der Herr hat Wohlgefallen an denen, die ihn fürchten". Nicht schnell, E major – Soprano soloist
6. Finale with Fugue: "Alleluja! Lobet den Herrn", A major
  1. Final choir: Etwas schnell
  2. Fugue: Nicht schnell – Choir with soloists at the end

As in the Missa solemnis there are clear influences of Haydn and Schubert, particularly in the ariosos. There are in the Finale two passages with brass instrument chords followed by an Alleluja, for which Bruckner drew his inspiration from the Hallelujah of Händel's Messiah, on which he often improvised on organ.

For the first time Bruckner is using a full orchestra, with yet some archaism such as the use of horns (part 4) and trombones (part 6) in homophony with the choir. "[The] closing Alleluja ... is Bruckner's most extended fugue prior to the Fifth Symphony." The five-minute long fugue is more mature than the quite formal fugues of Bruckner's previous works – a consequence of Sechter's tuition. Bruckner uses, e.g., in the development the theme against its inversion.

Psalm 146 is also remarkable as the first piece in which Bruckner experimented with organic thematic integration on a large scale ... [It] also deserves to be heard more often for the lovely string pianissimo in its opening bars that foreshadows the beginning of both the D minor and F minor Masses.

== Discography ==
There are three publicly available recordings:

- Wolfgang Riedelbauch, Anton Bruckner – Psalm 146 and Windhaager Messe, Hans Sachs-Chor, Lehrergesangverein Nürnberg (in double choir) and Nürnberger Symphoniker, LP-Colosseum SM 548, 1972.
  This historical recording, which used a score made by Riedelbauch-self, based on a copyist's manuscript, has been transferred to CD, together with that of the Requiem by Hans Michael Beuerle: Klassic Haus KHCD-2011-092, 2011.
- Gerd Schaller, Bruckner – Mass 3, Psalm 146, Organ works, Philharmonischer Chor München and Philharmonie Festiva, CD: Profil Hänssler PH16034, 2015.
  The sound by Schaller is wider and also more detailed ... There is only one downer: The double choir of the third movement is only clearly audible and unfolds its effect by Riedelbauch. By Schaller it can at best be guessed.
- Franz Anton Krager, Texas Music Festival Orchestra, Texas Music Festival Chorus - Texas Music Festival Houston, 8 June 2024 – on CD Symphonic Choral Masterworks of Anton Bruckner, Bruckner Society BSA-006 – with double choir.

== Sources ==
- Cornelis van Zwol, Anton Bruckner – Leven en Werken, Thot, Bussum (Netherlands), 2012. ISBN 90-686-8590-2
- John Williamson, The Cambridge Companion to Bruckner, Cambridge University Press, 2004. ISBN 0-521-80404-3
- Uwe Harten, Anton Bruckner. Ein Handbuch. Residenz Verlag, Salzburg, 1996. ISBN 3-7017-1030-9.
- Anton Bruckner – Sämtliche Werke, Band XX/4: Psalm 146 (1856–1858), Musikwissenschaftlicher Verlag der Internationalen Bruckner-Gesellschaft, Paul Hawkshaw (Editor), Vienna, 1996
