= Summer music festival =

A summer music festival is a musical festival held during the summer. Specific events include:

- Caramoor Summer Music Festival
- Ebrach Summer Music Festival
- Lake District Summer Music
- New Brunswick Summer Music Festival
- New York Summer Music Festival
- The Summer Music Festival at Roseberry
- Sitka Summer Music Festival
- Stratford Summer Music Festival
- Toronto Summer Music Festival

== See also ==
- Summer music (disambiguation)
- Music festival
