= Regentenbau (Bad Kissingen) =

German concert hall

Coordinates: 50.1981°N 10.0746°E

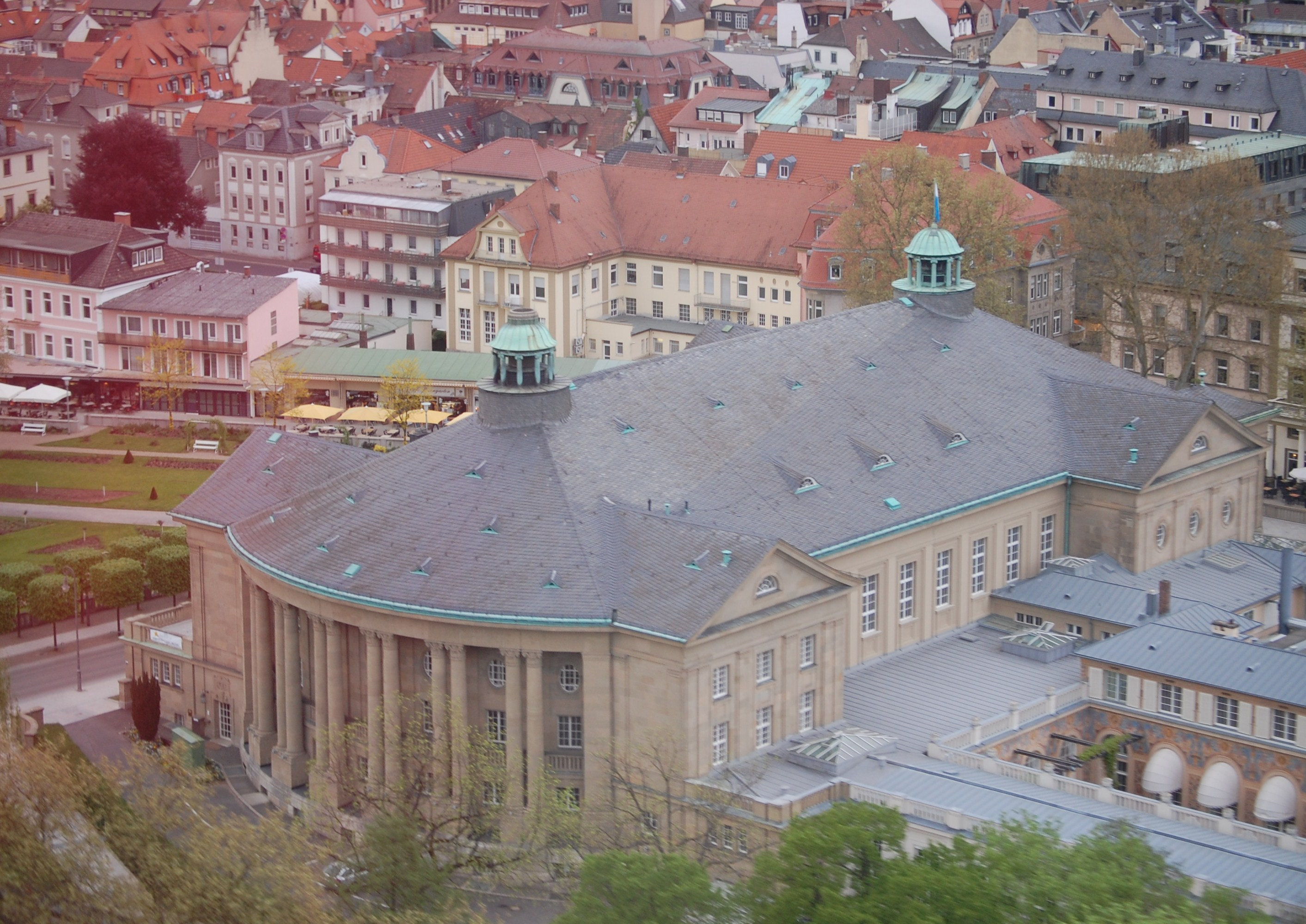
Regentenbau

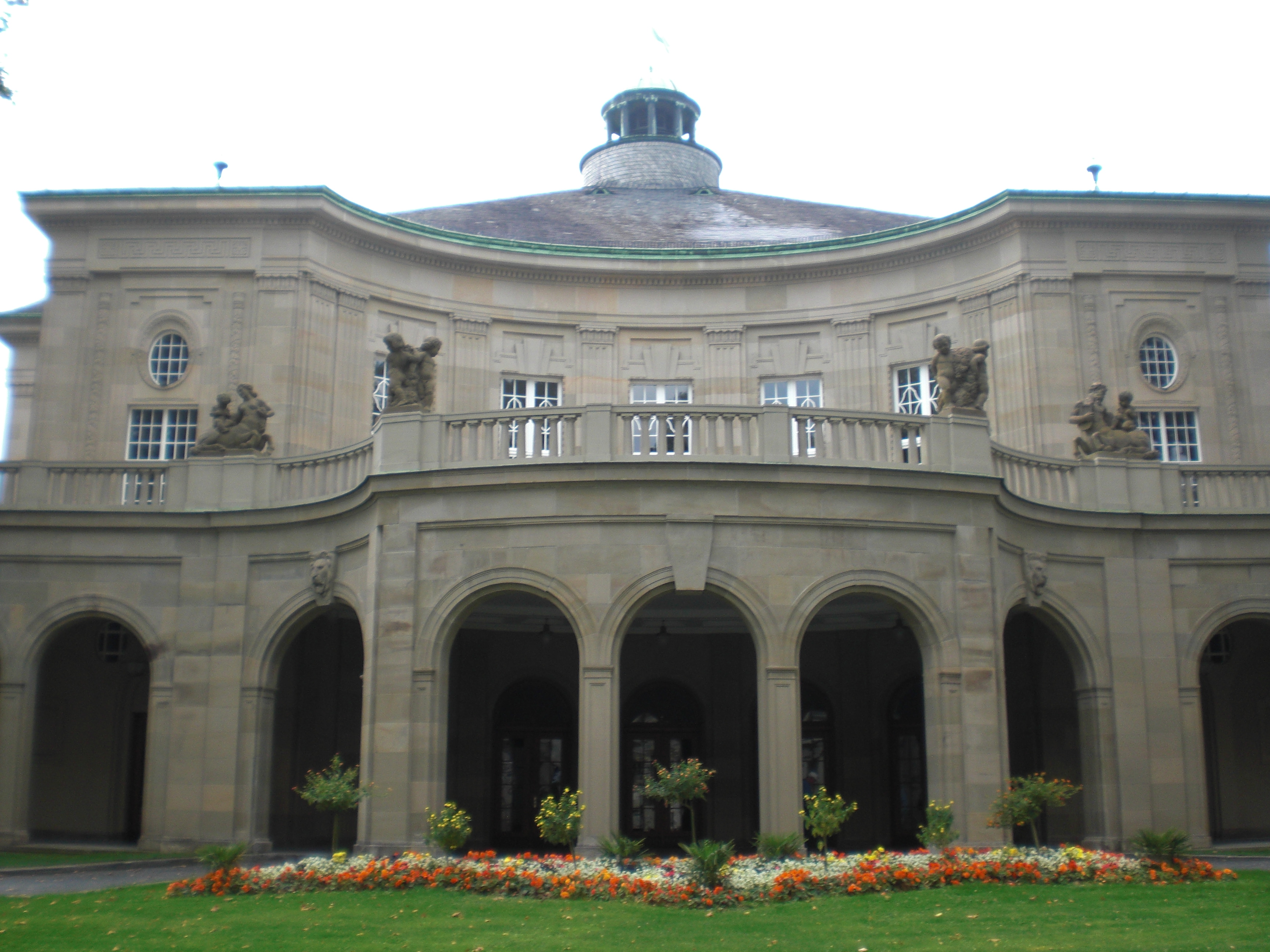
Entrance of the Regentenbau

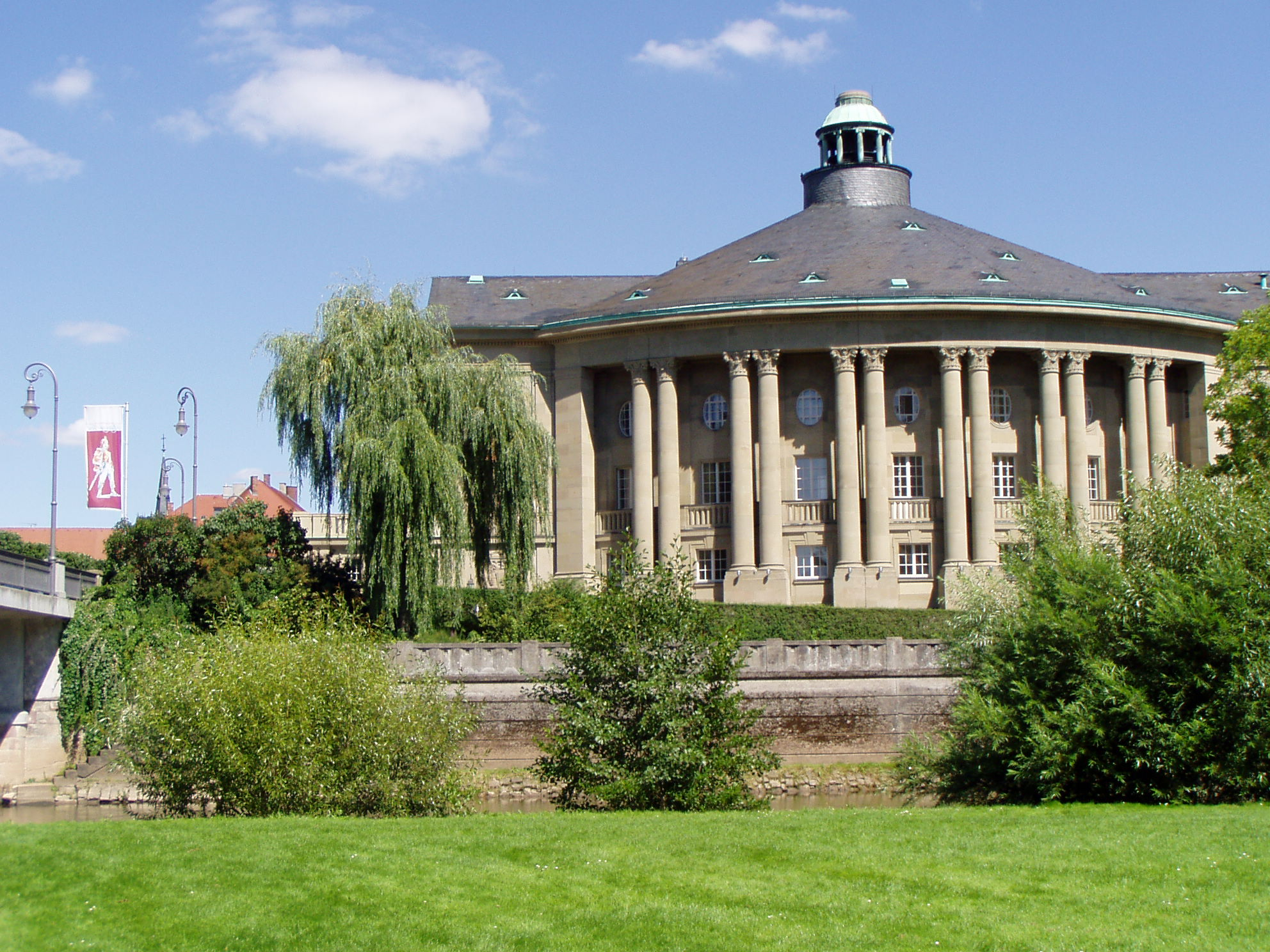
Backfront of the Regentenbau

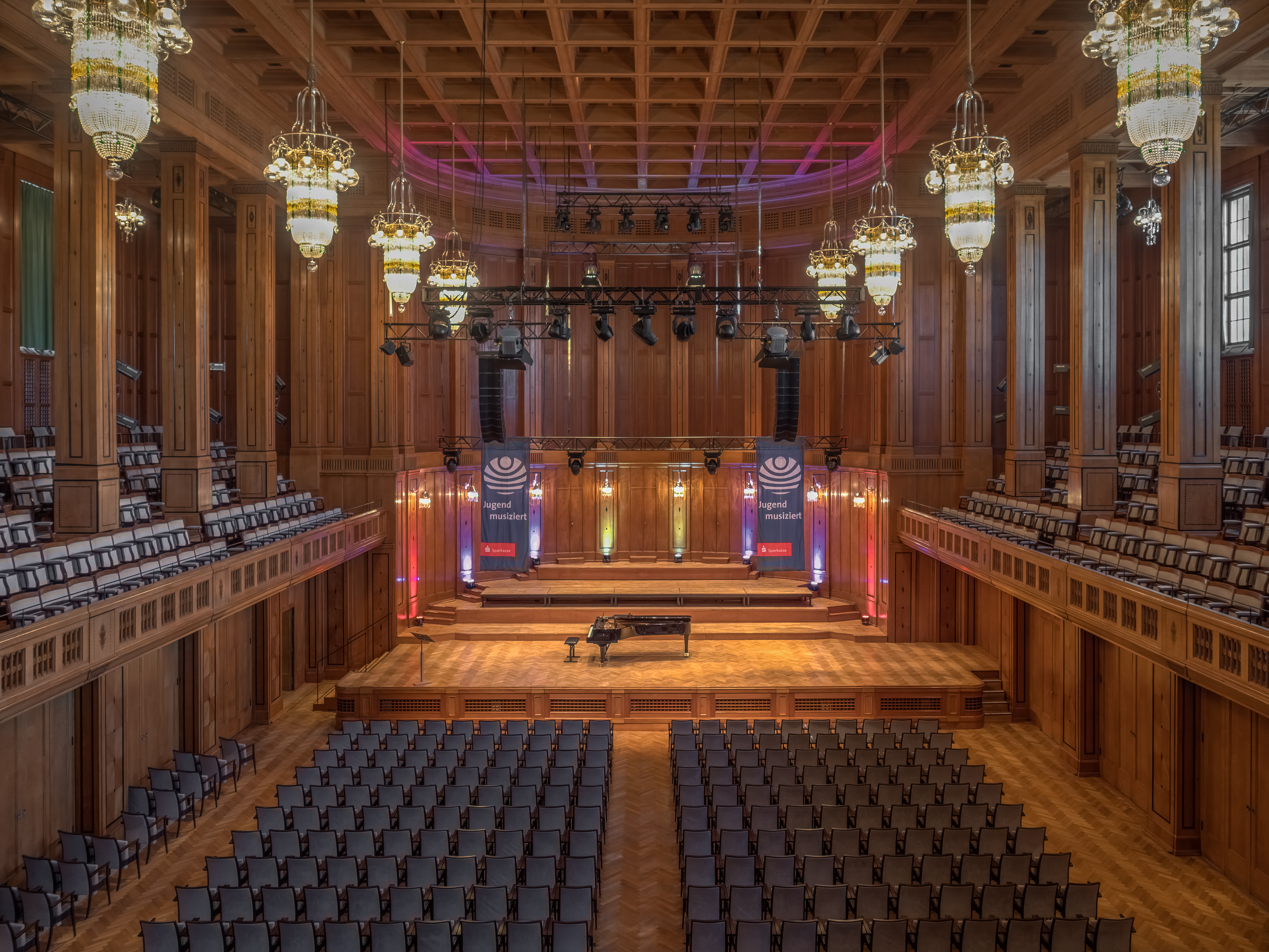
Max Littmann Hall (Great Hall)

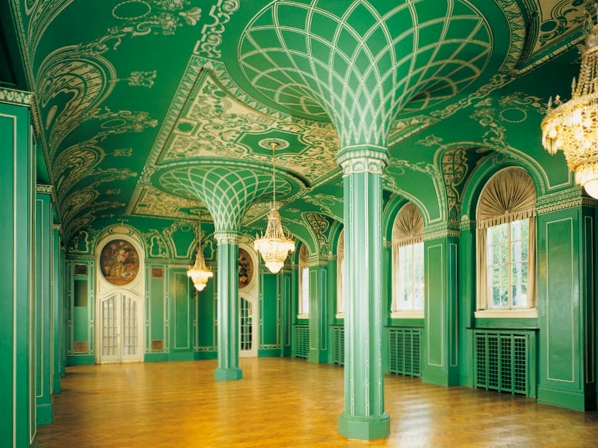
Grüner Saal (Green Hall) of the Regentenbau

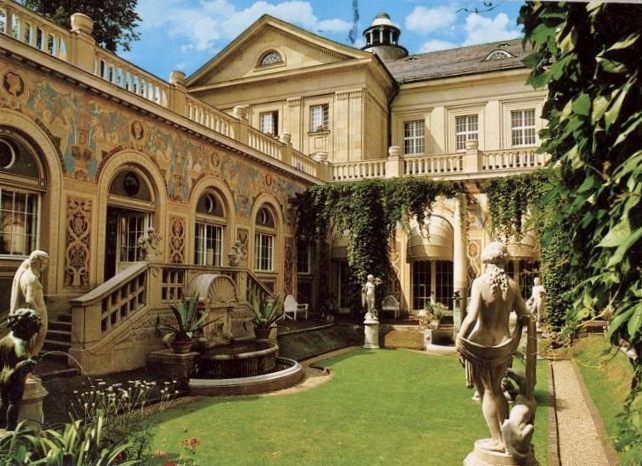
Courtyard of the Regentenbau

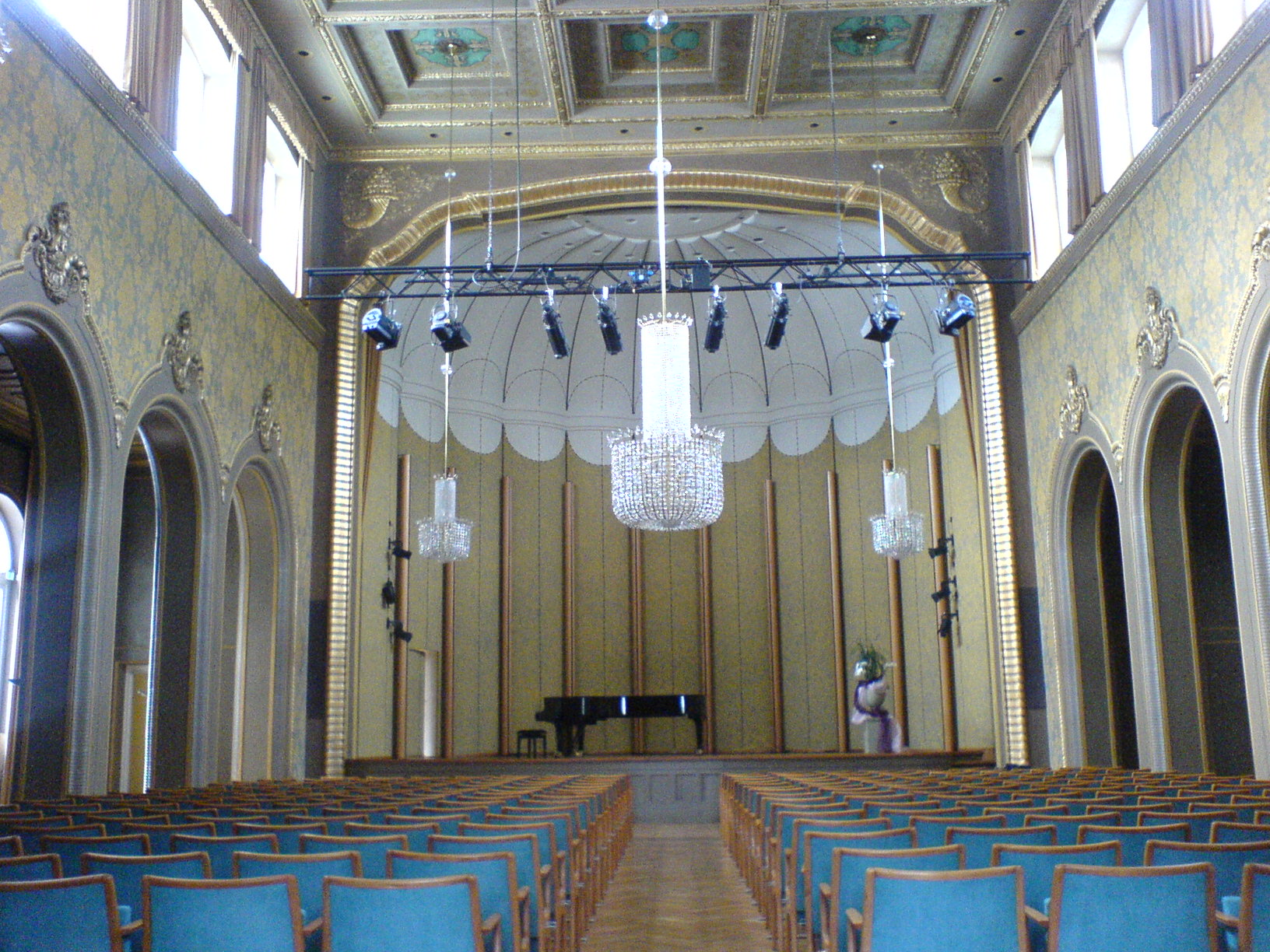
Rossini-Saal (Rossini Hall), 1911 transformed by Max Littmann

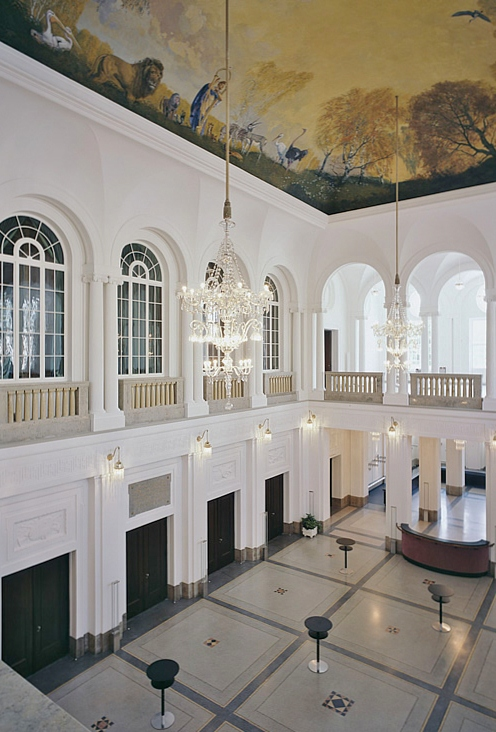
Foyer of the Regentenbau

The Regentenbau (German for "regent's building") is a German concert hall in the town Bad Kissingen in Bavaria.

== History ==
The concert hall was built from 1911 to 1913 in a neo-baroque style according to the plans of the architect Max Littmann. Prince regent Luitpold of Bavaria commissioned the construction of the Regentenbau. The building was inauguratet by his son and successor Ludwig III of Bavaria on 15 and 16 May 1913. The owner is the state of Bavaria. The Regentenbau is under monument protection and is registered under the number D-6-72-114-38.

Situated between the Kurgarten (spa garden) and the river Fränkische Saale, the Regentenbau completed the spa area of Bad Kissingen. It was the conclusion of the comprehensive building contract in the royal spa, which Luitpold of Bavaria had given in 1905 to Max Littmann as "special commissioner for the state's new buildings in the royal spa garden". This order, for which the Bavarian government released funding in 1910, included also the construction of the Wandelhalle (promenade hall) and the renovation and structural integration of the older Arkadenbau of Friedrich von Gärtner, a 200-meter-long arcade building from 1838 with its hall Conversationssaal (today Rossini-Saal), to the Regentenbau.

From the opening until 1918 the Vienna Symphony as the saisonal spa orchestra performed its evening concerts at the Regentenbau. The Munich Philharmonic followed from 1919 to 1942. Then musical life ended because of the Second World War. After the war the Regentenbau was occupied by the American troops for two years. Musical life started again in 1950 with the Hofer Symphoniker (until 1979). Since 1986 the Regentenbau is the main location of the festival Kissinger Sommer.

From 2003 to 2005 the Regentenbau was completely renovated.

== The halls ==
=== Max-Littmann-Saal (Max Littmann Hall) ===
The Max-Littmann-Saal was originally called Großer Saal (Great Hall). After the end of renovation in 2005 it was officially renamed after the architect Max Littmann. The hall of about 455 square meters is 36 meters long, 16 meters high and is surrounded by a large U-shaped gallery. In the case of row seating, the hall accommodates a maximum of 1,160 guests, in the parquet about 660 and on the gallery about 500 seats. It is used for concerts, but also for conferences. Experts count it to the best concert halls of the world. The paneling of cherry-wood gives the hall, which is of the “shoebox type”, a much acclaimed acoustics. Behind the panelling a gap of five to ten centimeters to the wall acts as resonance space. Measurements during the renovation of 2005 brought reverberation times of 1.1 to 1.8 seconds. These acoustics are similar to the Boston Symphony Hall or the Usher Hall in Edinburgh. So the Max-Littmann-Saal often was used for recordings of classical music. In the recent past the Philharmonie Festiva and the conductor Gerd Schaller produced CD recordings of symphonic works of Anton Bruckner, Johannes Brahms, and Franz Schubert, as well as the first recordings of the opera Merlin by Carl Goldmark and the Great Mass by Johann Ritter von Herbeck. Many concerts of the Kissinger Sommer are recorded in the Max-Littmann-Saal by the public broadcasting company Bayerischer Rundfunk. The hall is connected to the neighbouring halls Grüner Saal and Weißer Saal by big foldable doors, which make it possible to enlarge the capacity of the Max-Littmann-Saal.

=== Grüner Saal (Green Hall) ===
The hall in art nouveau style was thought to be a room for chamber music. It is 21 meters long and 8,5 meters wide and has 120 seats.

=== Weißer Saal (White Hall) ===
The hall in rokoko style of about 150 square meters and a capacity 100 places is also used for small concerts. On one side it is connected to the Littmann-Saal with three-meters-high mirror doors, while glass doors lead to the Schmuckhof on the other side.

=== Schmuckhof (Courtyard) ===
The Schmuckhof, built in the neo-baroque style, is a small inner courtyard between the White Hall, the 150 square meter Salon am Schmuckhof (110 people in rows) and the adjacent reading rooms. It leads to foyer of the Rossini-Saal.

=== Rossini-Saal (Rossini-Hall) ===
Littmann transformed the old Conversationssaal (Conversation Hall) of Friedrich von Gärtner and created an additional stage. It is also used for smaller concerts. 280 people can sit in the hall with its 330 square meters. After the general renovation around the year 2000 the hall was renamed Rossini-Saal after the composer Gioachino Rossini, who has visited Bad Kissingen as a spa guest in 1856.

== Bibliography ==
- Max Littmann: Die neuen staatlichen Bauten in Bad Kissingen. In Deutsche Bauzeitung, 47. year of issue 1913, No. 39 (vom 14. Mai 1913), pp. 349f. (and following numbers)
- Das neue Kurhaus in Kissingen. Architekt Geh. Hofrat Prof. Max Littmann in München. In Zentralblatt der Bauverwaltung, 33. year of issue 1913, No. 45 (of 7. Juni 1913), p. 293f.
- Rolf Bothe (Hrsg.): Kurstädte in Deutschland. Zur Geschichte einer Baugattung. Frölich & Kaufmann, Berlin 1984, ISBN 3-88725-002-8, S. 93f.
- Cornelia Oelwein: "Max Littmann (1862-1931). Architekt, Baukünstler, Unternehmer". Sonderpublikation des Stadtarchivs Bad Kissingen, Band 7. Michael Imhof Verlag, 2013, ISBN 978-3-86568-923-8
