= List of organ compositions by Anton Bruckner =

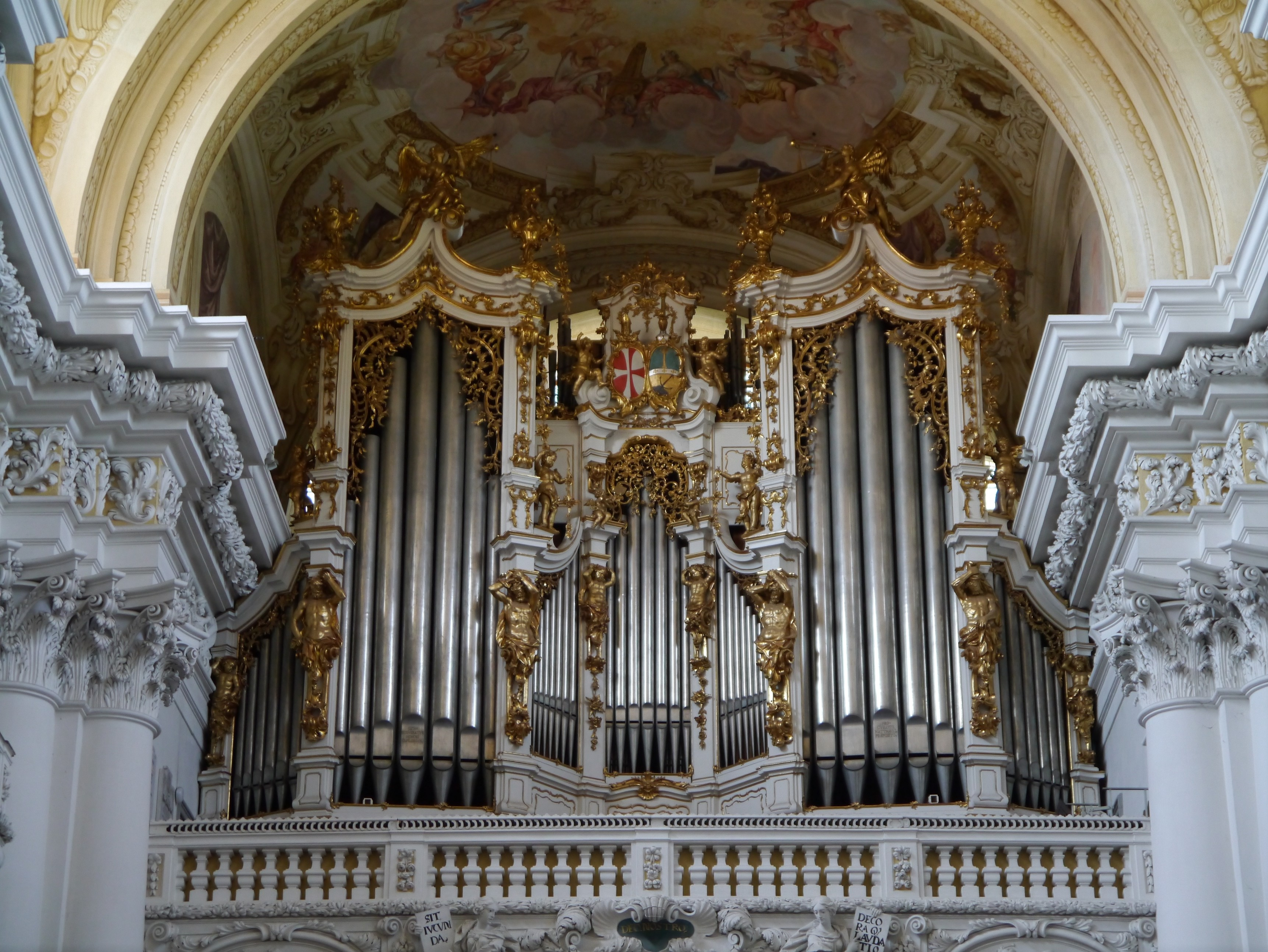
The Bruckner-Orgel, St. Florian Abbey

Although he was a proficient organist, Anton Bruckner left few compositions for the organ.

Bruckner has mainly made his name because of his organ playing during his journeys to Nancy, Paris, London and the states of imperial Austria. His celebrity as organist was mainly based on his improvisation skill. The compositions Bruckner left for the organ are of secondary significance in his portfolio. With the exception of the later Perger Präludium with its romantic chromaticism, the few organ works date from his earlier lifetime and are mainly based on the baroque tradition.

== Compositions ==
Only five pieces and two sketches are indubitably autograph compositions:

- Nachspiel in D minor, WAB 126/1 – a postlude composed in c. 1846. The manuscript with this and the following work is stored in the archive of the St. Florian Abbey – Gesamtausgabe, Band XII/6, No. 1
- Andante in D minor, WAB 126/2 – a prelude composed also in c. 1846 – Gesamtausgabe, Band XII/6, No. 2
- Vorspiel und Fuge in C minor, WAB 131 – a prelude and fugue composed on 15 March 1847. The incomplete manuscript, which is stored in the archive of the Seitenstetten Abbey, was first published in Band II/2, pp. 78–82 of the Göllerich/Auer biography. The incomplete score was completed by Franz Philipp in 1929 – Gesamtausgabe, Band XII/6 No. 3
- Fuge in D minor, WAB 125 – a fugue composed by Bruckner on 7 November 1861 for an examination, which he wanted to have in Vienna on 19 November 1861. The sketch is stored in the Österreichische Nationalbibliothek. The final score is found in the Sechter-Studienbuch (library of the Diocese of Münster). – Gesamtausgabe, Band XII/6, No. 4.
- Präludium (Perger Präludium) in C major, WAB 129 – a prelude composed in 1884. A sketch is stored in the archive of the Kremsmünster Abbey. The final score, which was given to Bruckner's pupil Otto Loidol, is put in the Gesamtausgabe, Band XII/6, No. 5.
- Improvisationskizze Ischl 1890, WAB add 240 – themes for improvisation sketched by Bruckner in July 1890 for organ playing during the wedding of Archduchess Marie Valerie of Austria with Archduke Franz Salvator in Bad Ischl on 30 July 1890. The sketch, which is stored in the Österreichische Nationalbibliothek, is put in the Gesamtausgabe, Band XII/9, No. 6. The sketch combines two themes from the finale of Symphony No. 1, which Bruckner was reviewing at that time, the fugato from Händel's Hallelujah and the Kaiserhymne.
  In 1990 Erwin Horn made an improvisation based on the two themes from the finale of Symphony No. 1 as Improvisationskizze Bad Ischl and issued a score of his improvisation. This improvisation was later recorded again by Klaus Sonnleitner, Siegfried Petri (2009) and Gerd Schaller (2015).
  In 2007 Horn made a second improvisation based on the four themes of the sketch as Kaiserliche Festmusik.
- Konzertskizze in C minor, WAB add 241 – Three themes for an organ improvisation on 28 August 1884 in Kremsmünster.

In addition:

- Adagio für Orgel (Adagio for organ) – a sketch in B major, which was found in 1953 in a catalog of the Musikautographen-Sammlung of Louis Koch. It is a first draft for the main theme of the Adagio of the Symphony No. 9 – Gesamtausgabe, Band XII/6, No. 7
- Seven short organ preludes, WAB 127 & 128, written in c. 1835. Doubts have been cast on their authenticity. They are presumably copies of compositions by Johan Baptist Weiß or other organists – Gesamtausgabe, Band XII/6, No. 8 (Addendum).
- Präludienbuch, WAB add 334 – a 58 pages manuscript with 159 short organ pieces, which are presumably transcriptions of works of other composers. Twenty-two of these pieces were issued by Louis Dité in his Vademecum für Organisten, Weinberger Verlag, 1947, and Festliche Präludien, Weinberger Verlag 1948.

== Selected discography ==
A few "complete editions" of the organ works have been released. Even if one includes the "apocryphal" preludes WAB 127 and 128, the playing time only slightly exceeds half an hour: 33 minutes for Horn, 26 minutes for Schaller, who does not include these preludes.
In addition to the seven preludes WAB 127 and WAB 128, there are other short organ works, that are assigned to Bruckner in obscure collections. Franz Haselböck has recorded some of them on harmonium – very interesting as a curiosity, but unfortunately they were not released on CD. With all the necessary critical restraint, a collection of such curiosities would be desired.

- Franz Haselböck, Brucknerorgel der Piaristenkirche Wien, 19th-Century Austrian Organ Music: Anton Bruckner Complete Works for Organ / Simon Sechter Selected Organ Works – LP: Musical Heritage Society MHS 1972
- Augustinus Franz Kropfreiter, Bruckner-Orgel (St. Florian Monastery), Verein der Freunde der Oberösterreichischen Stiftskonzerte – LP: ORF/Lesborne L 2955, c. 1973. A digitalisation of the LP can be heard on John Berky's website: Organ works by Augustinus Franz Kropfreiter (items 5 to 9)
- Heinz Lohmann, Klais-Orgel of the Jesuit Church, Mannheim - LP: RBM 3004, 1974; reissued as CD: Klassic Haus KHCD 2012–008, 2011
- Erwin Horn, Klais-Orgel of the Frauenkirche, Nuremberg, Bruckner Orgelwerke – CD: Novalis 150 071–2, 1990 - with the Improvisationskizze Bad Ischl (improvisation on the finale of Symphony No. 1)
- Erwin Horn, Bruckner-Orgel (Sankt Florian), Was mir die Liebe erzählt - CD: MOT 13551, 2007 - with the Kaiserliche Festmusik (improvisation on the four themes of the sketch)
- Klaus Sonnleitner, Kaleidoskop - Die Brucknerorgel in St. Florian - CD: Spektral SRL4-12107, 2011 (except the preludes WAB 127 & 128)
- Gerd Schaller, Eisenbarth-organ of the Church of the Ebrach Abbey, Bruckner – Mass 3, Psalm 146, Organ works – CD: Profil Hänssler PH16034, 2015 (except the preludes WAB 127 & 128)

A recording by AMuSicScoRe of the 22 issued pieces from the Bruckner Präludienbuch can be heard on YouTube:

- Cadence in D major, WAB add 334/1 - Cadence in D major, WAB add 334/2 - Moderato in D major, WAB add 334/3
- Lento in E♭ major, WAB add 334/4 - Con moto in E♭ major, WAB add 334/5 - Cadence in E major, WAB add 334/6
- Langsam in E minor, WAB add 334/7 - Cadence in F major, WAB add 334/8 - Moderato in F major, WAB add 334/9
- Andante in F major, WAB add 334/10 - Cadence in G-Dur, WAB add 334/11 - Allegro in G major, WAB add 334/12
- Cadence in G minor, WAB add 334/13 - Cadence in G minor, WAB add 334/14 - Verse in G minor, WAB add 334/15
- Mit starken Stimmen in A♭ major, WAB add 334/16 - Cadences in A♭ major, WAB add 334/17 & 334/18 - Andante in A major, WAB add 333/19
- Sine nomine in A major, WAB add 334/20 - Moderato in B♭ major, WAB add 334/21 - Andante in B♭ major, WAB add 334/22

Note: a transcription in D♭ major of the Andante in F major, WAB add 334/10, is a popular piece by horn quartets.

A few other not issued pieces from the Bruckner Präludienbuch by AMuSicScoRe can be heard on YouTube:

- A-Wn PhA 1459, Orgelbuch aus dem Besitz Anton Bruckners

A few pieces from Bruckner's Kurze-General-Baß-Regeln, WAB add 258 can by AMuSicScoRe can be heard on YouTube:

- Kurze Generalbass Regeln, WAB add 258

== Sources ==
- August Göllerich, Anton Bruckner. Ein Lebens- und Schaffens-Bild, c. 1922 – posthumous edited by Max Auer by G. Bosse, Regensburg, 1932
- Uwe Harten, Anton Bruckner. Ein Handbuch. Residenz Verlag, Salzburg, 1996. ISBN 3-7017-1030-9.
- Anton Bruckner – Sämtliche Werke, Band XII/6: Organ works (1846–1890), Musikwissenschaftlicher Verlag der Internationalen Bruckner-Gesellschaft, Erwin Horn (Editor), Vienna, 1998
- Cornelis van Zwol, Anton Bruckner 1824–1896 – Leven en werken, uitg. Thoth, Bussum, Netherlands, 2012. ISBN 978-90-6868-590-9
- Crawford Howie, Anton Bruckner - A documentary biography, online revised edition
