= Philharmonie Festiva =

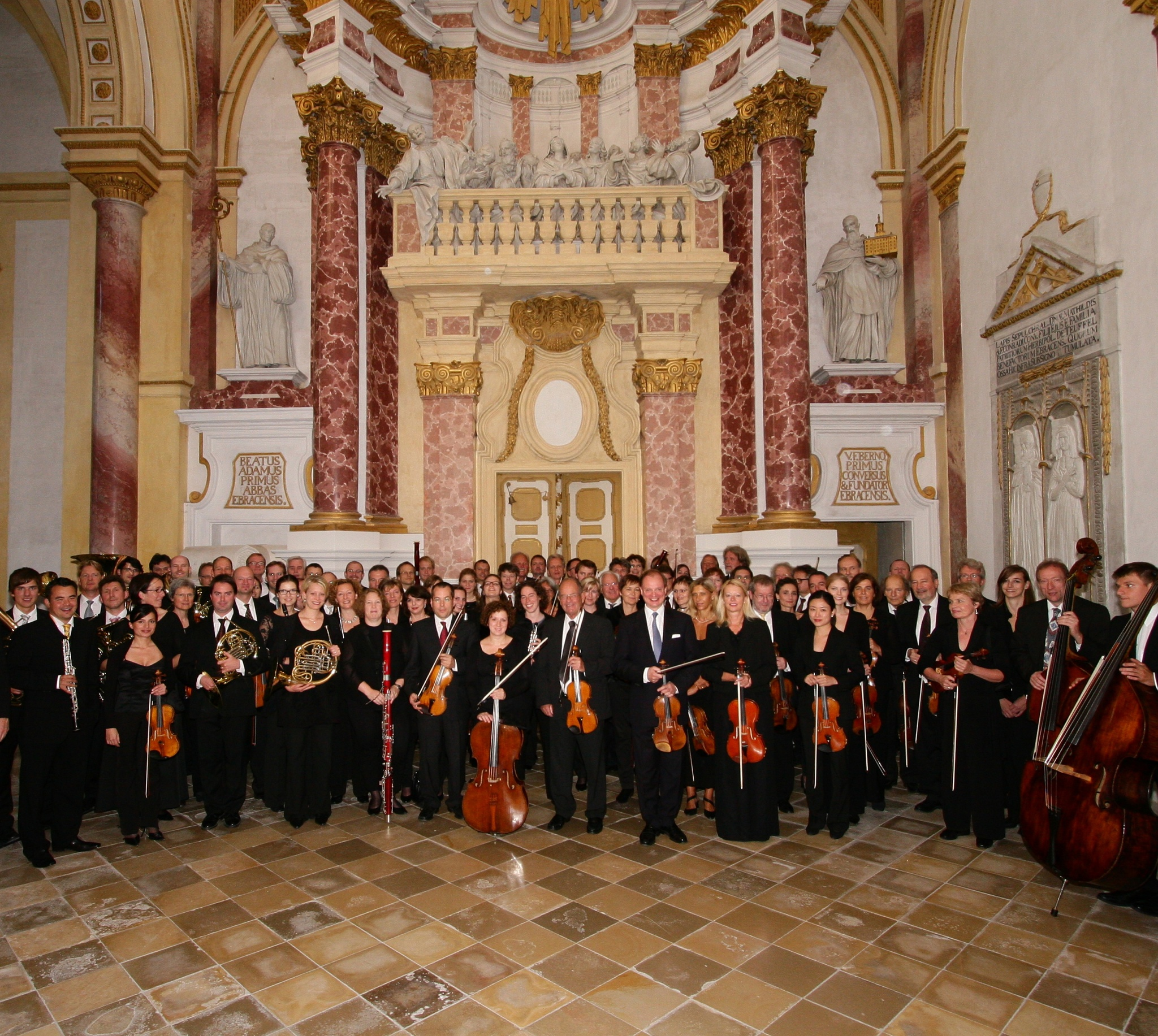
Philharmonie Festiva

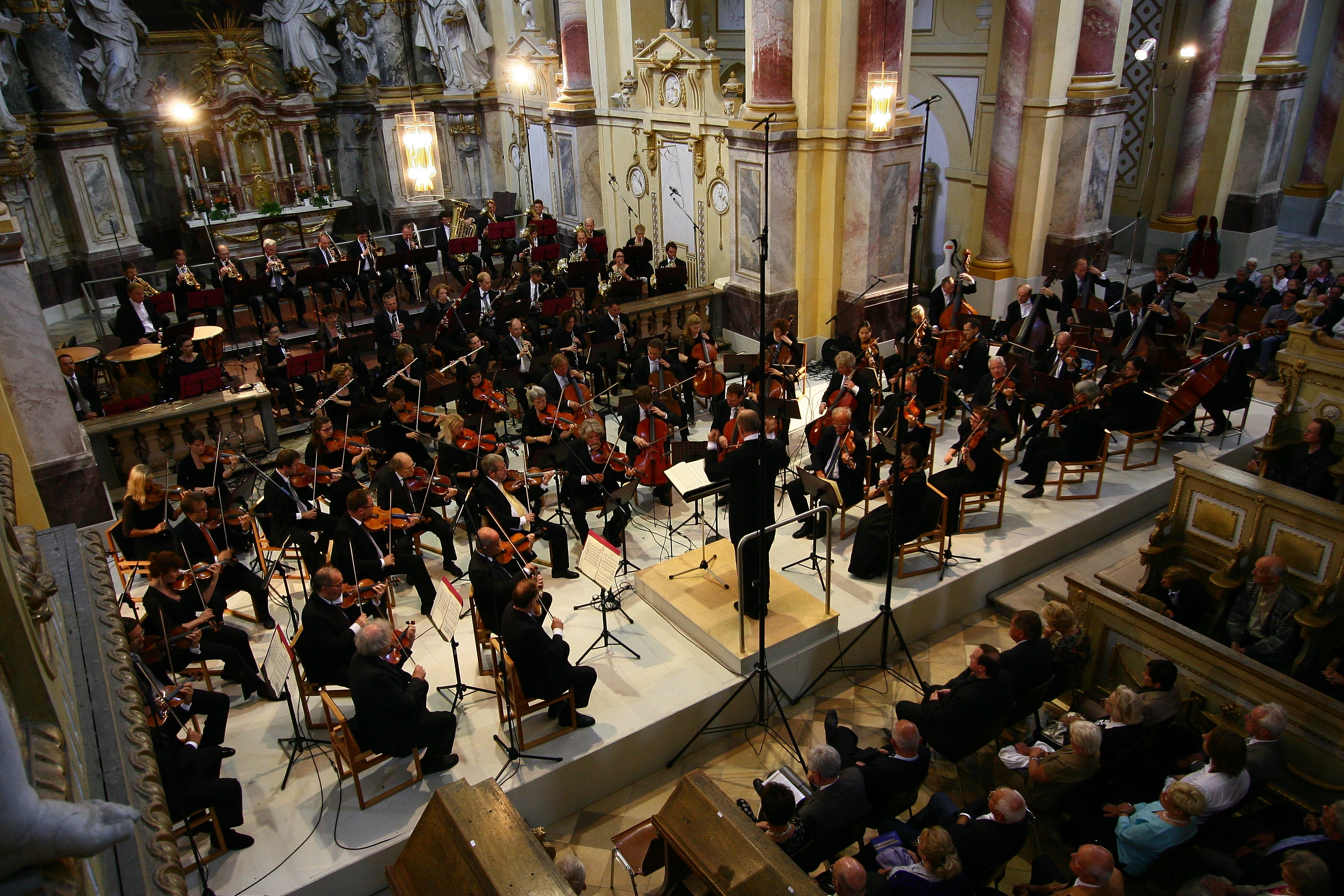
Philharmonie Festiva, concert, Anton Bruckner: Symphony no. 8

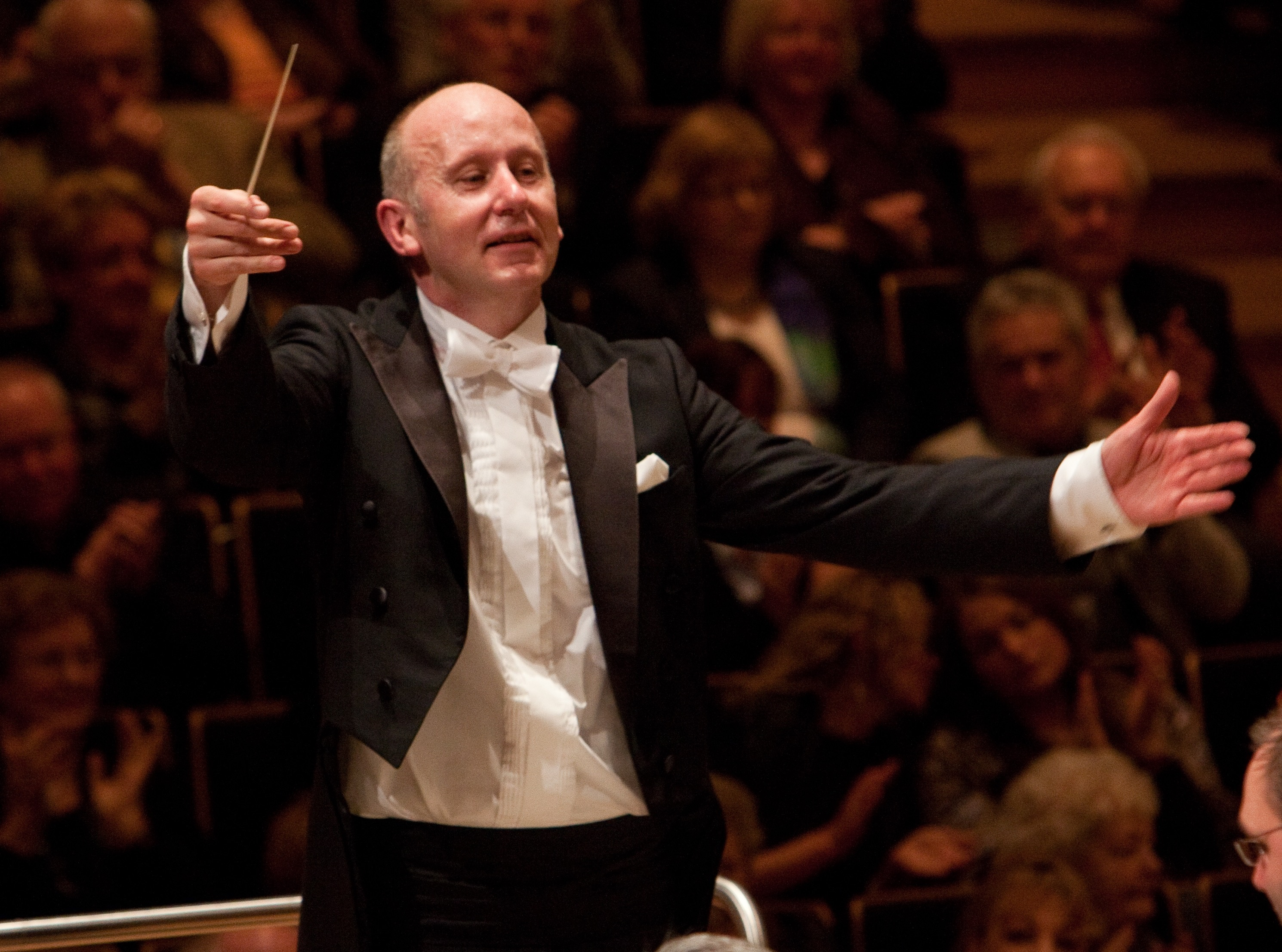
Gerd Schaller

The Philharmonie Festiva is a festival orchestra founded by the conductor Gerd Schaller and became internationally recognized for its Bruckner recordings.

== Description ==
The musicians of the Philharmonie Festiva, which was founded in 2008, come from renowned orchestras in Germany and neighboring countries. According to Gerd Schaller, "the orchestra is not a short-term, active project orchestra, but the intention was to build and develop a top-class orchestra, a festival orchestra, in the long term, to undertake his own ambitious projects at the Ebrach Summer Music Festival; certainly synonymous with something elitist claim."

One focus of the orchestra are the concerts and recordings of Anton Bruckner's symphonies in the BRUCKNER2024 project. In the meantime, 20 CDs with works by Bruckner have already been published, which received international attention.

Allain Steffen writes on Pizzicato: "With this recording of the 5th Symphony, Gerd Schaller and the Philharmonie Festiva have finally become the first group of the best Bruckner interpreters of the present. [...] First class is the Philharmonie Festiva, which does not need to shun the comparison with top European orchestras. [...] A recording that without hesitation can be counted among the best of the discography!”

Ralph Moore reviews the recording of the 3rd Symphony in the music magazine MusicWeb International: "I have noted before the excellence of the Philharmonie Festiva, [...] whose golden sonority suffuses the score with nobility. The “Gesangsperiode” passages are delicate and lyrical, and the tutti climaxes weighty, underpinned by glorious brass [...]“

Also on MusicWeb International stated Brian Reinhard regarding the recording of the 6th Symphony: "I’m not totally sure what the Philharmonie Festiva even is, but they are really excellent, and have a fuller, more richly developed Bruckner sound [...]. They rise to every challenge. [...] Gerd Schaller’s Sixth is outstanding, one of the best recordings of the symphony in years. Not what you expected, is it? Me neither.“

Regarding the recording of the F minor Mass by Anton Bruckner, Christian Hoskins notes at Gramophone: "[...] The performance by Gerd Schaller is quite exceptional, making a superb pendant to his recently completed cycle of the symphonies [...] The recording is as excellent as the performance."

Bruckner's 9th Symphony was recorded three times by the Philharmonie Festiva under the baton of Gerd Schaller: 2010 with the addition of the final part by William Carragan, 2016 with the completion of Gerd Schaller himself and 2018 in Schaller's revised version.

The CD recordings of the Philharmonie Festiva took place predominantly in the abbey church of the former Cistercian monastery Ebrach and in the Max Littmann hall of the regent building in Bad Kissingen. They are part of the long-term planned Bruckner cycle as part of the Ebracher Summer Music Festival. The CD recordings were supported by a cooperation with the Bavarian Broadcasting Studio Franken and broadcast on BR-Klassik. All recordings have been released by the label Profil Edition Günter Hänssler.

In addition to the standard repertoire with a focus on the works of Bruckner dedicated to the orchestra and rare musical works and rediscoveries (Carl Goldmark: Symphony No. 1) Franz Schubert: unfinished - "completed" in the four-movement version of William Carragan), as well as the Requiems by Franz von Suppé and the Great Mass by Johann Ritter von Herbeck, recorded together with the Philharmonischer Chor München. The American magazine Forbes has named the co-production of the Bavarian Broadcasting Corporation - Studio Franken with the label Edition Günter Hänssler of the Great Mass in E Minor by Johann Ritter von Herbeck to one of the ten best CD new releases of the year 2015.

Already with his first project, the world premiere recording of the opera Merlin by Carl Goldmark, the orchestra attracted attention by being awarded an ECHO Klassik Music Prize in 2010 for the "Opera Recording of the Year (19th century)".

== Recordings ==
=== Recordings of Anton Bruckner's symphonies ===
- Symphony in F minor of 1863 (2016)
- First Symphony - Linz version of 1866 (Carragan edition) - PH12022 (2012)
- Symphony in D minor of 1869 - PH15035 (2015)
- Second Symphony - version of 1872 (Carragan edition) - PH12022 (2012)
- Third Symphony - version of 1874 (Carragan edition), premiere recording - PH12022 (2012)
- Third Symphony - version of 1890 (Edition Schalk) – PH 18002 (2017)
- Fourth Symphony - version of 1874 (Edition Schaller) – PH 22010 (2021)
- Fourth Symphony - version of 1878/80 - PH11028 (2011)
- Fourth Symphony - version of 1878 with final movement entitled Volksfest (traditional fair) - PH13049 (2013)
- Fifth Symphony - PH14020 (2014)
- Sixth Symphony - PH14021 (2014)
- Seventh Symphony - PH11028 (2011)
- Eighth Symphony - intermediate variant of 1888 (Carragan edition), premiere recording - PH13027 (2013)
- Ninth Symphony - with final movement completed by William Carragan in the 2010 revision - PH11028 (2011)
- Ninth Symphony - supplemented from original sources and completed by Gerd Schaller – PH16089 (2016)
- Funeral music "To the memory of Anton Bruckner" by Otto Kitzler orchestrated by Gerd Schaller, premiere recording - PH13027 (2013)

=== Recordings with the Munich Philharmonic Choir ===
- Karl Goldmark: Merlin, premiere recording - PH09044 (2009)
- Franz von Suppé: Requiem - PH12061 (2012)
- Johann Ritter von Herbeck: Great Mass, premiere recording - PH15003 (2015)
- Anton Bruckner: Messe Nr. 3 f-Moll – PH16034 (2016)
- Anton Bruckner: Psalm 146 A-Dur – PH16034 (2016)

=== Other recordings ===
- Ludwig van Beethoven: Symphony no. 3 - PH15030 (2015)
- Ludwig van Beethoven: Symphony no. 4 - PH15030 (2015)
- Ludwig van Beethoven: Symphony no. 5 - PH15030 (2015)
- Karl Goldmark: Symphony no. 1 "Rustic Wedding" - PH10048 (2011)
- Franz Schubert: "Unfinished" Symphony in B minor D759 in the four-movement version of William Carragan, premiere recording - PH12062 (2012)
- Franz Schubert: "Great" Symphony in C major D944 - PH12062 (2012)
