= Roxy Coss =

American jazz saxophonist and composer

- Origin: Seattle, Washington, U.S.
- Occupation: Musician
- Instrument: Saxophone
- Website: roxycoss.com

Roxy Coss is a saxophonist, activist and composer based in New York. She is the winner of the ASCAP Herb Alpert Young Jazz Composer Award and has attracted attention from major music magazines and organizations.

== Background ==
Originally from Seattle, Coss is one of only a few female band leaders in the Jazz field. By the age of six or seven, she was taking piano lessons and composing music. At the age of nine she took up saxophone in her elementary school's band and by the age of eleven she was listening to jazz and playing in the jazz band at school. Also, at that time she entered into the city-wide "Reflections" composition contest and came in third.

In 2015, she served as a faculty member at the New York Summer Music Festival. 2016 marked the third year in a row that DownBeat 'Critics' Polls placed her on the "Rising Star" list as a Soprano Saxophonist.

== Career ==
Coss played with Clark Terry's Titans at a venue in 2005.

In November 2015, she was playing in the Jeremy Pelt Quintet for a weekend engagement at the Smoke at 2751 Broadway, at 106th Street. In 2016, her album Restless Idealism was released. The album which featured 10 original tracks featured Alex Wintz on guitar, Chris Pattishall on piano, Dezron Douglas on bass, and Willie Jones III on drums.

In October 2016 at the Lake George Jazz Festival, she was the featured soloist on the song "Nuthin'" which was performed by the DIVA Jazz Orchestra. Also that year she won the 2016 ASCAP Herb Alpert Young Jazz Composer Award. Her 2016 album, Restless Idealism got to #7 on Jazzweek, the US Nationwide Jazz Chart.

Along with The James Mustafa Jazz Orchestra, she was booked to appear at the Melbourne Big Band Festival in Victoria, Australia on February 12, 2017.

On March 31, 2017, her album Chasing The Unicorn which was released on Posi-Tone Records went on sale. It featured the tracks, "Chasing the Unicorn", "A Shade of Jade", "You're There", "Free to Be", "Oh! Darling", "Never Enough", "Virgo", "Unwavering Optimism", "Benny's Tune", "Endless Cycle", and "Crazy". In addition to Coss on tenor and soprano saxophones and clarinet, it featured Alex Wintz on guitar, Glenn Zaleski on piano, Rick Rosato on bass, and Jimmy Macbride on drums.

Roxy Coss started WIJO (Women in Jazz organization) in 2017. Coss is currently on faculty at the Juilliard School teaching Jazz Ensembles.

She released another album, "Disparate Parts" in 2022.

== Discography ==
Albums
| Title | Release info | Year | Notes |
|---|---|---|---|
| Roxy Coss | Self released | 2010 | |
| Restless Idealism | Origin | 2016 | |
| Chasing the Unicorn | Posi-Tone | 2017 | |
| The Future is Female | Posi-Tone | 2018 | |
| Roxy Coss Quintet | Outside In Music | 2019 | |
| Disparate Parts | Outside In Music | 2022 | |

== About ==
Roxy Coss has performed at major festivals and venues such as the: Newport Jazz Festival, Melbourne Big Band Festival, Earshot Jazz Festival, and several others. Her band, the Roxy Coss Quintet, has held residencies at New York City clubs, including SMOKE Jazz Club and Club Bonafide.

Coss has performed as a side musician with jazz greats including Clark Terry, Louis Hayes, Rufus Reid, Billy Kaye and Claudio Roditi. She was a member of trumpeter Jeremy Pelt’s group from 2012 through 2014, and toured with the MACKTET, co-led by Pelt and drummer Willie Jones III. She has been a member of The Diva Jazz Orchestra since 2010 and was a member of the Off-Broadway hit, Maurice Hines is Tappin’ Thru Life, and others.

Coss first started playing the piano at the age of five, where she learned the basics of music theory, composition, and ear training through the Robert Pace method. She picked up the saxophone at age nine, and fell in love with Jazz by eleven, playing in her middle school jazz band under the tutelage of Robert Knatt. Roxy graduated in 2004 from Garfield High School, where she toured and performed internationally with the world-renowned GHS Jazz Ensemble, led by Clarence Acox. Roxy went on to attend William Paterson University, where she graduated on a full scholarship Magna Cum Laude in 2008, with a Bachelor of Music in Jazz Studies/Performance. Roxy has also studied Saxophone privately with Rich Perry, Gary Smulyan, Donny McCaslin, and Mark Taylor. Several other people helped Coss study the saxophone as well.

As a composer, Coss has collaborated with her mother, Mary Coss, to create the soundtrack entitled Eternal, for an exhibition at METHOD Gallery. Coss was also commissioned by the Daniel Gwirtzman Dance Company to write the score for Breaking, a one-man dance piece in 2009.

Coss has served as an adjudicator for both the Northern Arizona University and Bellevue High School Jazz Festivals, and for the 2018 Vandoren Emerging Artist Competition. She regularly performs with teaching programs such as Jazz For Young People at JALC, Let Freedom Swing! at JALC, Jazz and Business Leadership Workshops at JALC, JazzReach led by Hans Shuman, and Generation Vandoren. She has also held faculty positions including Adjunct Woodwind Teacher at Ramapo High School in NJ, Director of Jazz Ensemble at Beacon High School in NYC, William Paterson University Summer Jazz Workshop, and New York Summer Music Festival. Roxy has appeared as a guest teacher at Queens College, “JazzGirls Day” at JALC, Seattle JazzEd’s “Girls Jazz Sleepover”, and at The Jazz Academy of Music. She has done guest lecture spots at universities such as Berklee College of Music, The New School (Jazz School), University of North Texas (Jazz Dept), Georgetown University, and University of Manitoba (Jazz Dept).

She is the Founder of Women In Jazz Organization (WIJO), and serves on the Board of Directors of Jazz Education Network (JEN). Coss is also on Jazz Faculty at The Juilliard School, The New School, and the Borough of Manhattan Community College (a CUNY School).

== Founding of WIJO ==
Roxy is the Founder of Women In Jazz Organization, a collective of over 300 professional jazz musicians who identify as women or non-binary. WIJO intends to help level the playing field, so that women and non-binary people have equal opportunity to participate in and contribute to the jazz community, leading to an improved and more rich, diverse, and successful art form. The organization is committed to honoring Black Americans as the creators of jazz. WIJO is largely a New York-based organization, with connections to other individuals and groups nationally and internationally. The organization aims to empower the individuals within, as well as come together to empower the larger community of jazz musicians who identify as women or non-binary as a whole. Members of the organization work to address inequalities in jazz culture to change the landscape of the current jazz scene. The organization also works to improve the perceptions and treatment of women and non-binary people in jazz from outside the jazz community.
