= BRUCKNER2024 =

BRUCKNER2024 is a musical project by the conductor Gerd Schaller, the Philharmonie Festiva, the Bayerischer Rundfunk – Studio Franken, the CD label Profil Edition Günter Hänssler and the Ebrach Summer Music Festival with the aim of performing and releasing all versions of the symphonies of Anton Bruckner on CD by the 200th birthday of the composer Anton Bruckner, including the seldom intermediate variants.

== Background of the version problem ==
Anton Bruckner has composed eleven symphonies, of which there are several versions or intermediate variants, which is primarily due to the composer's constant urge to change and to improve. Bruckner kept refining his compositions and looking for their ideal form. In addition, he often took the advice of friends and musically high-ranking personalities. The rejection of some of his symphonies meant that he kept doubts and made improvements. That is why many of his symphonic works have come down to us today in different, sometimes independent versions or as intermediate variants.

== Project goal ==
Dealing with the different versions and especially with the intermediate variants provide interesting insights into Anton Bruckner's composer workshop. This was decisive for the conductor Gerd Schaller to tackle a project in which all these versions as well as the essential intermediate stages are performed with just one orchestra and recorded on sound carriers. This should enable the listeners to directly compare the individual versions. This eliminates the differences in interpretation that are caused by the different views of different conductors and orchestras.

Since 2007, Gerd Schaller has continuously built up his Bruckner cycle, basis on which BRUCKNER2024 is based.
