= Ebrach Summer Music Festival =

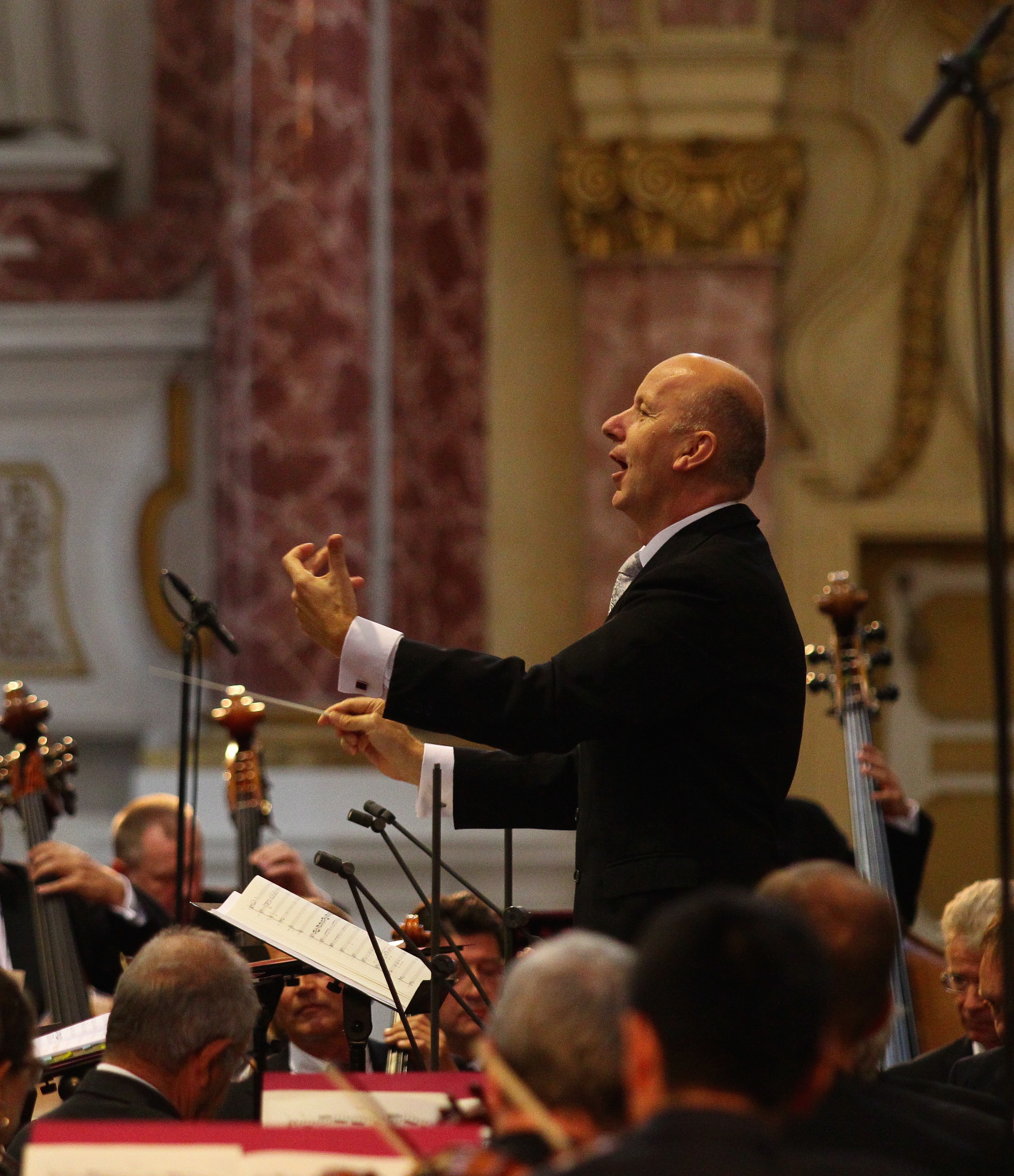
Gerd Schaller, Philharmonie Festiva

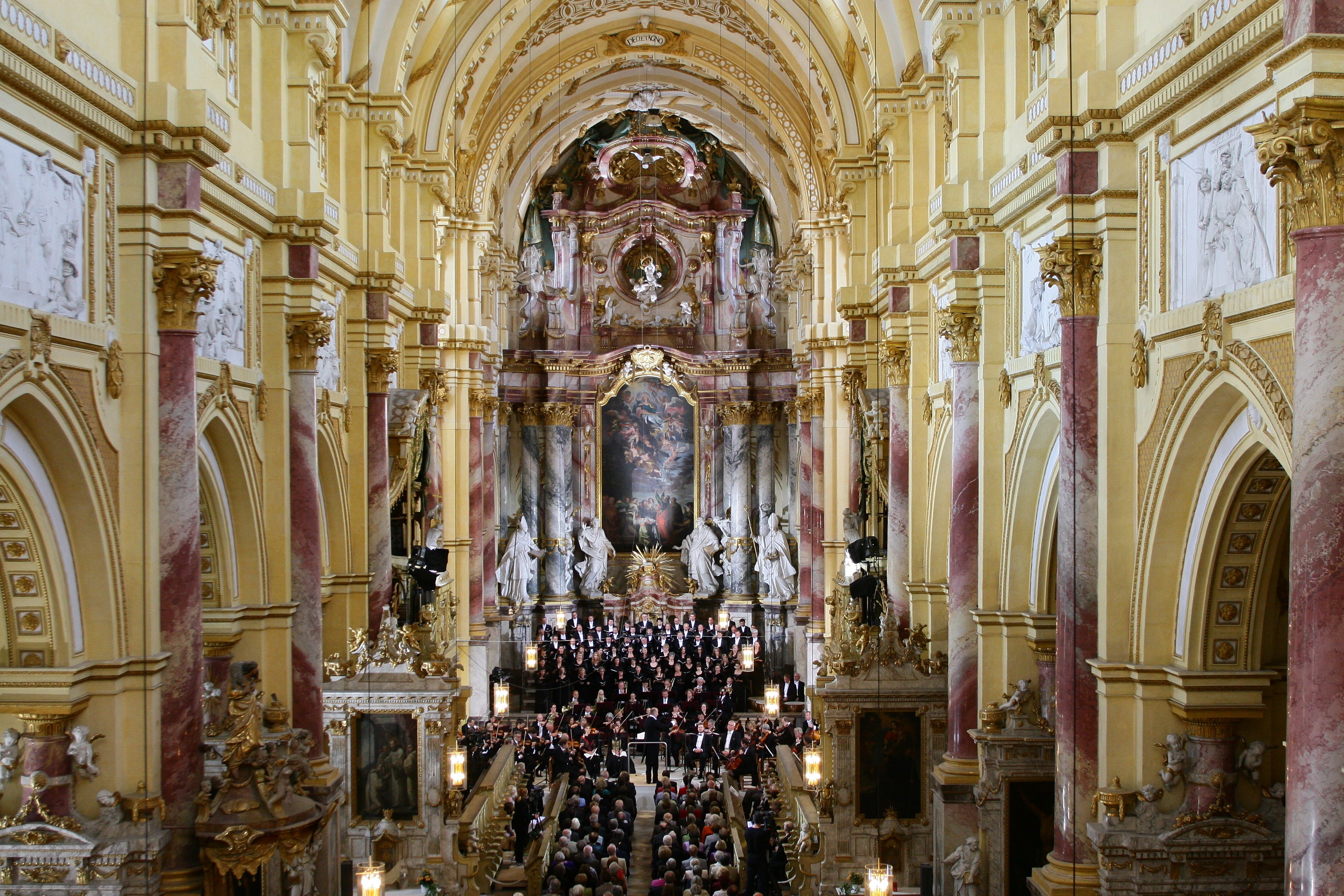
Abbey Church of Ebrach

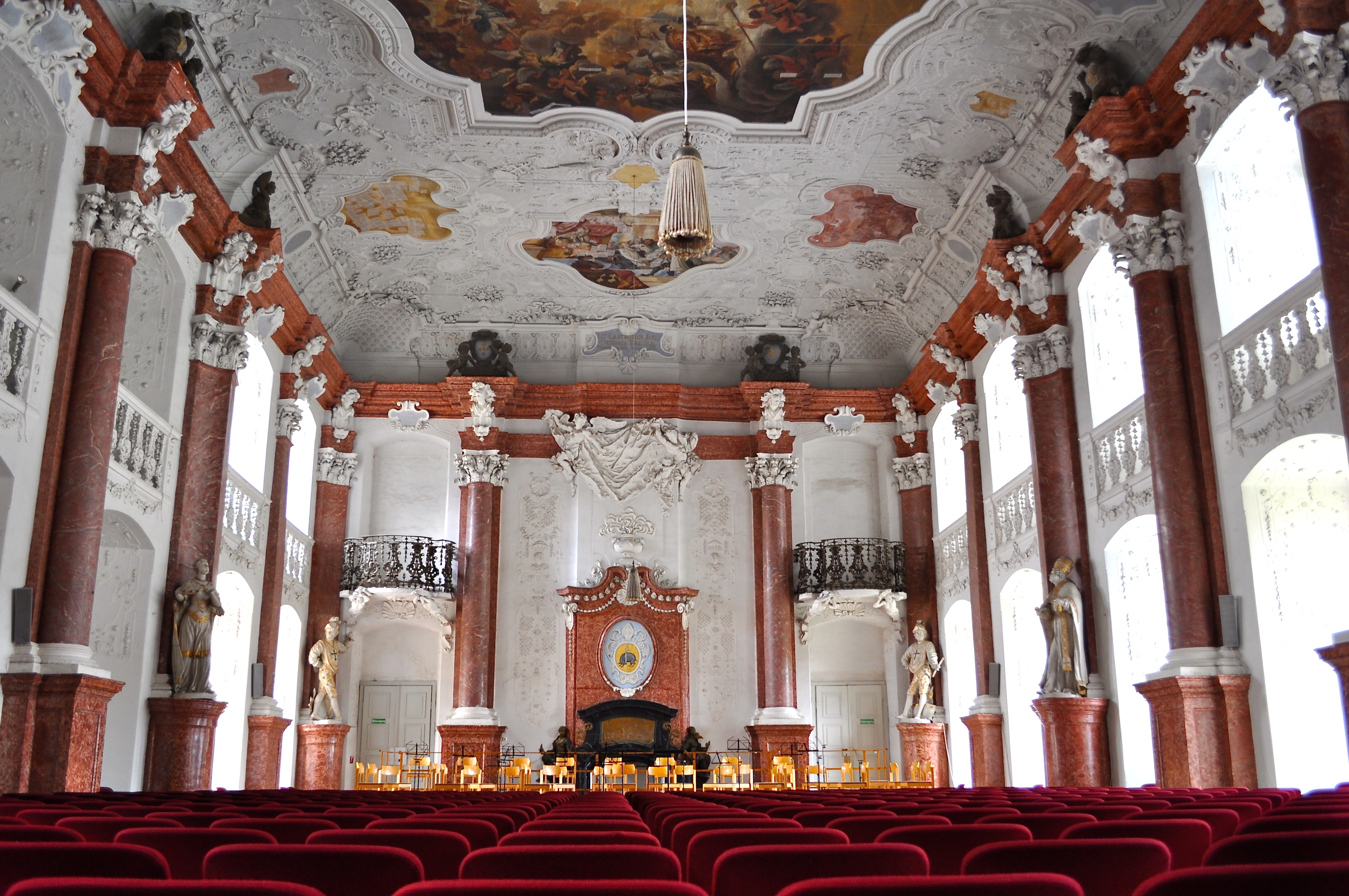
Kaisersaal Ebrach

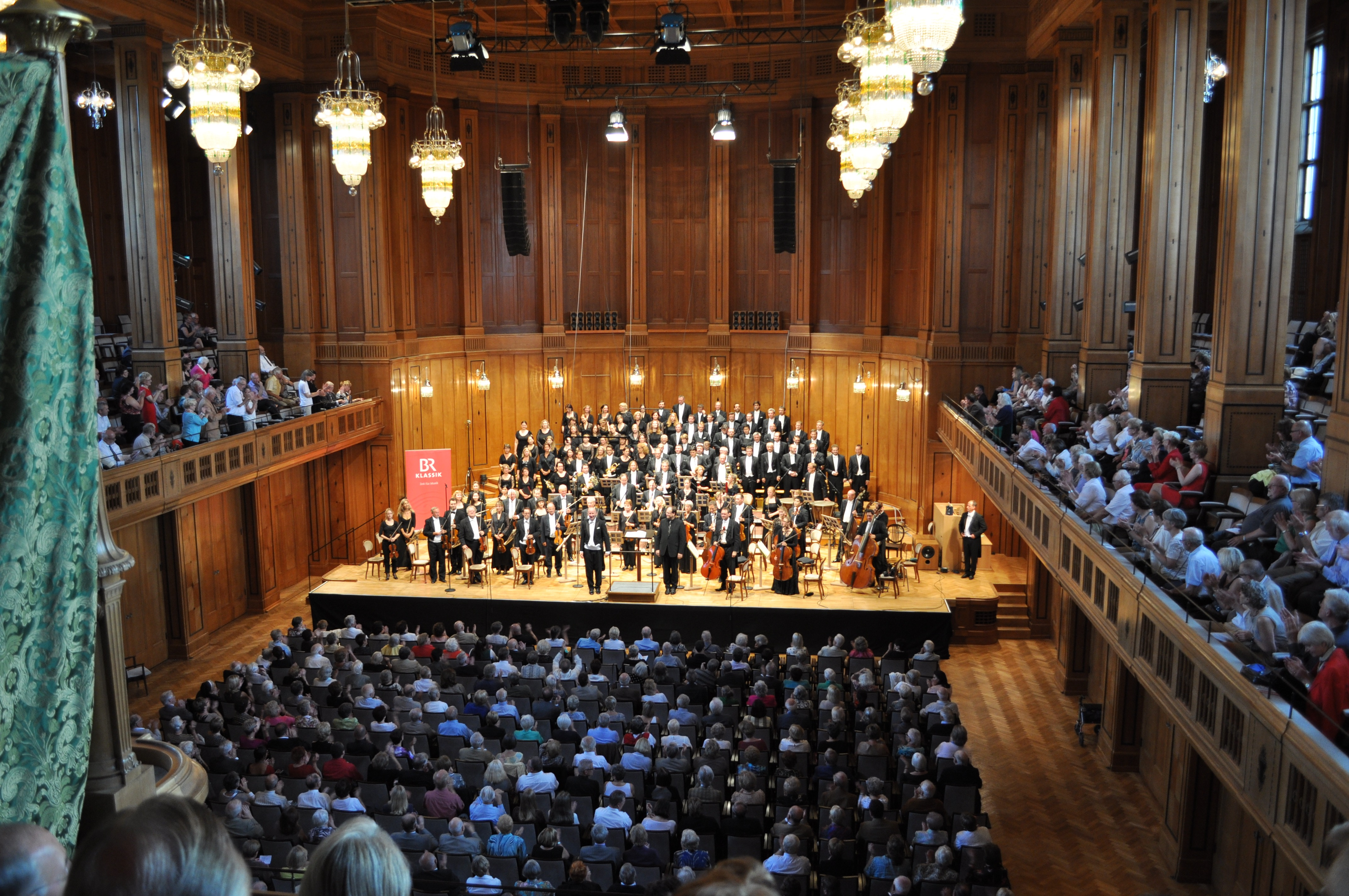
Regentenbau Bad Kissingen

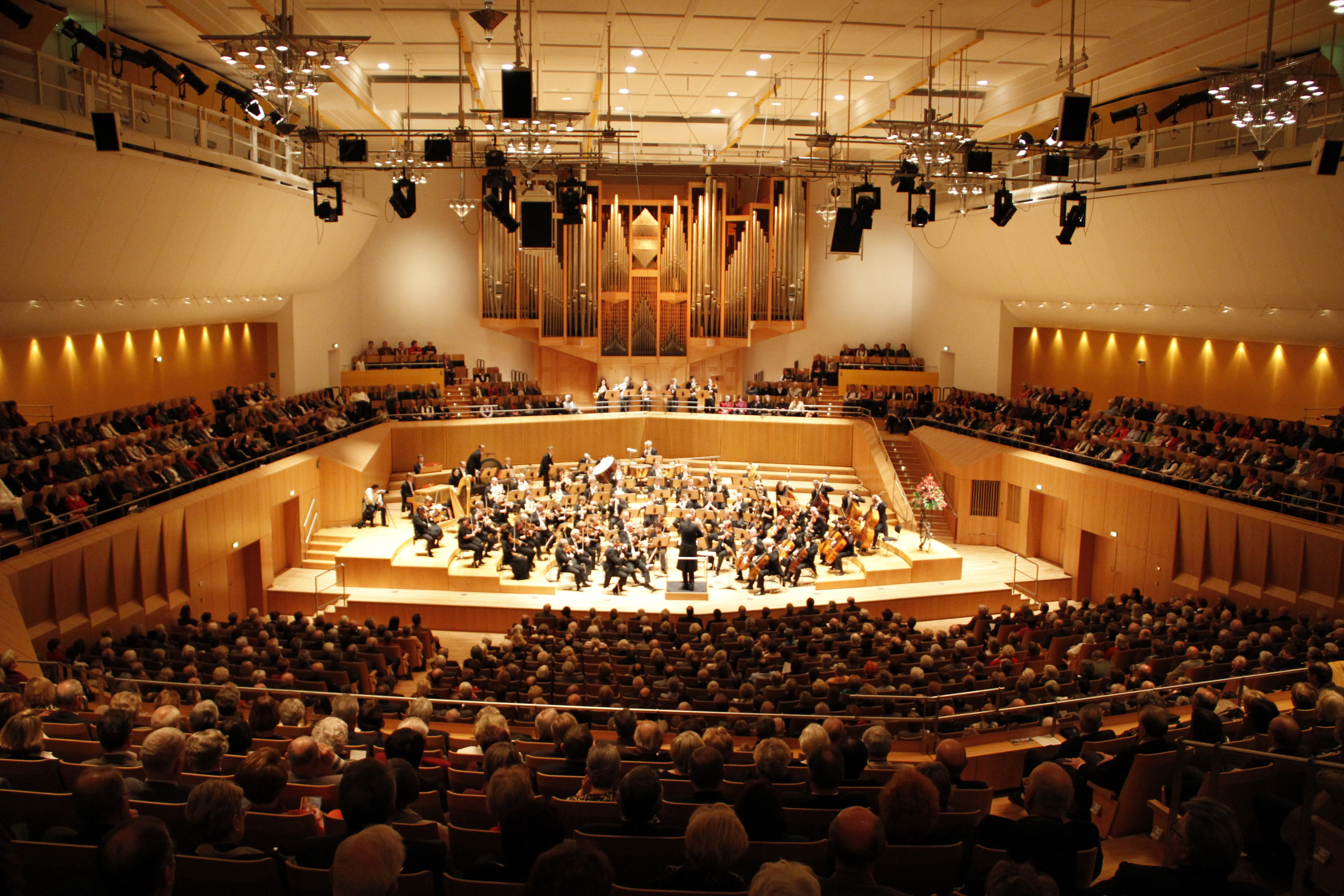
Konzerthalle Bamberg

The Summer Music Festival at Ebrach in Franconia) was established in 1990 by Gerd Schaller, who conducts it and is its artistic director.

The concerts take place in the Baroque Kaisersaal of the Cistercian Abbey of Ebrach and in the early Gothic abbey church. Performance venues outside of Ebrach include the Max Littmann Hall of the Regentenbau complex in Bad Kissingen and the Joseph Keilberth Hall of the Bamberg Konzerthalle.

The Ebrach Summer Music Festival gained international repute above all through the performance and complete recording of all Anton Bruckner's Symphonies with the Philharmonie Festiva conducted by Gerd Schaller and the BRUCKNER2024 project. In 2011, in collaboration with the Anton Bruckner Institute of Linz, the Ebrach Summer Music Festival organized a Bruckner Festival featuring the early Symphonies nos. 1, 2 and 3 and an academic symposium on the theme "Bruckner on his travels".

The festival also focuses on the performance and recording of musical rarities. Bayerisches Fernsehen, television channel of Bayerischer Rundfunk (BR), filmed the abbey church performance of Franz von Suppé's Requiem with the Munich Philharmonic Choir and the Philharmonie Festiva (broadcast by 3sat and other TV stations outside Bavaria).

Revivals of Karl Goldmark's opera Merlin and Johann Ritter von Herbeck's Great Mass in E minor took place in the Bad Kissingen Regentenbau. The concert recordings were made in collaboration with BR's Studio Franken and released on the Profil label of Edition Günter Hänssler.

The concerts held in the historical Kaisersaal focus above all on Baroque and Viennese Classical works. Most of the concerts are performed by the Philharmonie Festiva, the orchestra of the Ebrach Festival. Additionally, there are guest performances by prestigious ensembles and orchestras like the Munich Radio Orchestra, the Symphony Orchestra of the Prague National Theatre and the Radio Symphony Orchestra of Prague, a chamber orchestra of Leipzig Gewandhaus musicians, the Soloists of the Dresden Staatskapelle, the Nürnberg Symphony, the Munich Bach Soloists, the Braunschweig Staatsorchester and the Meiningen Hofkapelle. The Ebrach Summer Music Festival also provides a platform for young, auspiciously talented new artists.

The Ebrach Summer Music Festival is promoted by the municipality of Markt Ebrach.
