= Gerd Schaller =

German conductor (born 1965)

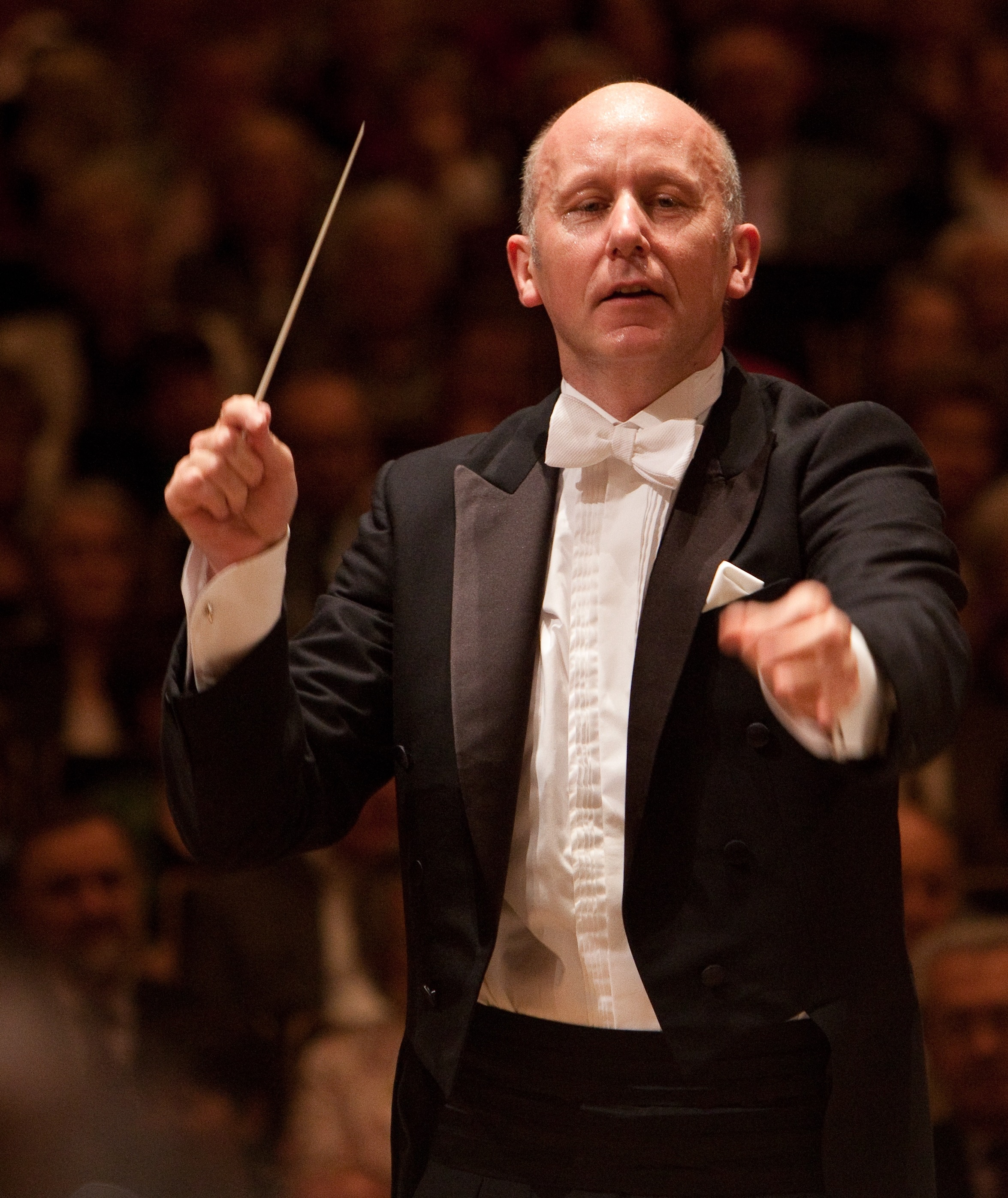
- Born: 1965 (age 60–61); Bamberg, Bavaria, West Germany
- Education: Würzburg College of Music,
- Occupation: Conductor of classical music
- Years active: 1993–present
- Known for: Complete Bruckner symphonies; first recordings of rare works
- Relatives: Rainer Schaller (brother)
- Website: gerd-schaller.de

Gerd Schaller (born 1965) is a German conductor, best known for his performing and recording rare works, including the first full recordings of Bruckner's output.

== Career ==
Schaller studied music at the Würzburg College of Music, and medicine at the Friedrich Alexander University of Erlangen-Nürnberg. He took up his first post at the Hanover Staatsoper in 1993. In 1998 he became principal conductor at the Braunschweig Staatstheater, and was general music director at the Magdeburg Opera from 2003 to 2006. Since 2006, he has worked freelance as a guest conductor with numerous orchestras, primarily in Germany, but also in the Czech Republic, Poland and Romania. Schaller's repertoire includes conducting German and Italian works, including those of Richard Wagner, Richard Strauss, and Giuseppe Verdi.

In 1990, Schaller established the Ebrach Summer Music Festival in Franconia, and he remains its artistic director. The event is staged in collaboration with BR's Studio Franken.

In 2008, Schaller founded the Philharmonie Festiva. Its core of Munich Bach Soloists has been expanded with musicians from across Germany.

In 2016, Gerd Schaller was unanimously selected by the Bruckner Society of America as the recipient of its Julio Kilenyi Medal of Honor.

== Bruckner recordings ==
=== Bruckner's Symphonies ===
Schaller is noted for his recordings of all of Anton Bruckner's symphonies, including versions never recorded before, for the Profil label of Edition Günter Hänssler. The recordings have been praised by Ken Ward, editor of The Bruckner Journal, as "a little musical miracle." Music critic David Hurwitz asserts Schaller "really is an excellent Bruckner conductor", and in reviewing Schaller's recording of Bruckner's Fifth Symphony, he states that Schaller, "doesn't put a foot wrong." AllMusic, reviewing a recording of Bruckner's Fourth, Seventh and Ninth Symphonies, notes, "The live performances of all three symphonies by Gerd Schaller and the Philharmonie Festiva are first-rate, with great attention to detail and controlled pacing that give the music propulsive movement and coherence." The same recording of the Fourth, Seventh and Ninth Symphonies was selected by Stereophile magazine in November 2011 as its "Recording of the Month".

==== BRUCKNER2024 ====
BRUCKNER2024 aims to perform all symphonies in all versions, including the rare intermediate versions, and to record them on CD by the 200th birthday of the composer Anton Bruckner. It is a co-production project between Gerd Schaller, the Philharmonie Festiva, the Bayerischer Rundfunk - Studio Franken, the CD label Profil Edition Günter Hänssler and the Ebracher Musiksommer. The basis of the project is the Bruckner cycle recorded by Gerd Schaller and the Philharmonie Festiva, primarily in the abbey church of the former Cistercian monastery in Ebrach since 2007, which is gradually being supplemented by recordings of other versions and on September 4, 2024, for the 200th birthday of the composer Anton Bruckner should be finished.

=== Schaller’s completion of Bruckner's Ninth (2016) ===
With the final movement of Bruckner's Ninth being a notable unfinished work, Schaller has composed his own completion of the symphony, closely based on Bruckner's notes, taking into account all available draft materials as far back as the earliest sketches, to close the remaining gaps in the score as much as possible, using original manuscript documents of Bruckner's, and running to 736 bars. Additionally, Schaller was able to supplement archival and manuscript material with missing elements in the score by drawing on his experience as a conductor, and of applying Bruckner's compositional techniques to the recordings of the complete cycle of all the composer's eleven symphonies; so that even passages without continuous original material are in a recognisably Brucknerian style. Schaller first performed his version of the finale with the Philharmonie Festiva in the abbey church at Ebrach on July 24, 2016, as part of the Ebrach Summer Music Festival. Reviewing the double-CD recording of the performance, Ralph Moore writes that the performance was an, "account to vie with the very best, immeasurably enhanced by an extraordinarily rich and complex arrangement and “elaboration” of the accumulated mass of sketches and sections of score which Bruckner left behind. Even without the finale, this would have been a monumental event; the addition of Schaller's completion made it one of those musical memories to treasure", and concludes that, "Schaller certainly makes musical sense of the remnants of Bruckner’s score and the memory of my encounter with the final ten minutes of this performance remains for me one of the most thrilling musical experiences of my life." Bruckner Insiders described it as "one of the bests sounds and interpretations", and continued,

"Previous attempts to complete the 4th movement ended fully out of style, [...]. Not so Schaller's version. He matches first time the dimension of the symphony and manages to set a point on top for a fulminate final. And even better, this new version even has a "Reprise", that none of the others tried, although in can be found in Bruckner's sketches. Schaller created an excellent coda with a full dramatic development before it. He made like a retrospective of other Bruckner's symphony themes but citing them in an indirect and modified way. Bruckner's doctor noted that Bruckner had played for him the version of the finale on piano, where he overlapped the themes of the last symphonies. Exactly this was done by Gerd Schaller, giving the coda as much authenticity as possible from the currently available material and information."

Ken Ward writes in The Bruckner Journal of Schaller's aims in embarking on his completion:

"It was the overall shape and significance of the finale, as Schaller understands it, that was the guiding consideration with respect to how to make Bruckner’s fragments and sketches performable. In conversation he was anxious to point out that this was just his view, his aim wasn’t to produce a work with pretensions to being a definitive reconstruction, and certainly not drily academic, but to use what Bruckner had written in a way that made best musical and spiritual sense to him."

The fugue of the final movement is particularly central to Schaller's completion - the heightened contrapuntal tension concentrated into this fugue is used in the finale as a lead to the climax to the thematic material at the start of the symphony, transposed to the major key, and as a polythematic review of all movements as in the Eighth Symphony. Ward writes of it, "The fugue worked very well, with tension maintained and intensifying strongly. The recapitulation of the triplet horn theme, where Bruckner’s completed bifolios cease, continues and builds and then falls quiet." In his completion of the coda of the final movement, Schaller draws on themes and motives from across Bruckner's works in the form of a compositional retrospective with building-blocks from earlier symphonies, choral symphonic works and thematic references to other movements of the Ninth.

==== Technical details for the Schaller Completion of Bruckner's Ninth ====
Instruments: Triple woodwind (flutes, oboes, B flat clarinets, bassoons); brass: 8 horns in F (7th/8th also in B flat; horns 4-8 alternate with Wagner tubas: 2 tenor tubas in B flat and 2 bass tubas in F), 3 trumpets in F, alto, tenor and bass trombones, contrabass tuba; timpani; strings (violin I / II, viola, cello, double-bass).

Timings of the four movements are as follows:

Feierlich, Misterioso: 25:54 (567 bars)
Scherzo. Bewegt, lebhaft - Trio. Schnell: 10:58 (250/264 bars)
Adagio. Langsam, feierlich: 23:00 (243 bars)
Finale. (Bewegt, doch nicht zu schnell): 24:40 (736 bars)

=== Schaller's completion of Bruckner's Ninth (revised 2018) ===
2018 Gerd Schaller revised his version of the final movement of Bruckner's Ninth from the experience of the first performance. He has attached particular importance to more clarity and clarity of the structures. As far as the orchestration is concerned, he has thinned out some passages and orchestrated others more richly. But there are also compositional changes, for example in the apotheosis of the coda. In 2019 the double-cd with the revised final movement has been released bei Profil Hänssler. 2018 the score has been published by Ries & Erler, Berlin.

=== Schaller's organ transcription of Bruckner's Ninth including the version of the Finale (revised 2020) ===
In 2020 he arranged Anton Bruckner's 9th Symphony, including the final movement that he completed, for organ and played it himself on the main organ of the former Cistercian abbey church in Ebrach. The Bayerischer Rundfunk (Studio Franken) produced the recording, the CD was released in 2021 by Profil Edition Günter Hänssler. Gerd Schallers work was guided by 19th-century French organ composers Alexandre Guilmant, Louis Vierne and Charles Marie Widor, all of whom wrote organ sonatas and symphonies for the instrument. In The Bruckner Journal Ken Ward writes: "But what Schaller has created from Bruckner’s 9th is an ‘organ symphony’ – not as a poor substitute for the real thing, but as a work to be considered in parallel to the original."

=== Orchestral Version of Bruckner's Quintet ===
2018 Gerd Schaller has prepared an orchestral version of Bruckner's string quintet, the first for full orchestra. The original chamber polyphony of the five solo string players is retained in his strategy of arrangement, but at the same time much symphonic material is incorporated. It's a Classical-Romantic arrangement with doubled woodwinds, four horns, two trumpets, three trombones and timpani to preserve the structures of the original composition and at the same time reinforce the symphonic content.

== Rare works ==
Schaller's recording career has had a strong emphasis on lesser-known operas and concert rarities, including the first recordings of numerous pieces. His recordings of lesser-known operas have included Karl Goldmark's The Queen of Sheba, and Goldmark's Merlin; as well as the first recording of Johann Simon Mayr's Fedra in co-operation with North German Radio. His first recordings of other pieces include Johann von Herbeck's Great Mass.

Schaller's recording of Merlin won the ECHO Klassik Prize in 2010 in the "Opera Recording of the Year (19th century)" category. In addition to a CD release, his performance of Franz von Suppé's Requiem has been broadcast on German television and radio.

In addition to his opera recordings, his live performances have included Alban Berg's Wozzeck, Jules Massenet's Hérodiade, Erich Wolfgang Korngold's Die tote Stadt (The Dead City), Alexander von Zemlinsky`s The Dwarf, Francesco Cilea`s Adriana Lecouvreur, and Leoš Janáček's The Makropulos Affair.

== Orchestra conducting ==
Schaller has conducted the following orchestras:

- Bachsolisten, Munich.
- Chamber Philharmonic of Bamberg.
- Braunschweig Staatstheater.
- George Enescu Philharmonic, Bucharest.
- Hanover Opera.
- Kapellsolisten (soloists) of the Dresden Staatskapelle.
- Lower Saxony State Orchestra, Hannover.
- Magdeburg Philharmonic.
- Meiningen Hofkapelle.
- Munich Bach Soloists.
- Munich Radio Orchestra.
- National Radio Orchestra of Romania.
- NDR Radio Philharmonic.
- Nürnberg Symphony.
- Radio Symphony Orchestra of Prague.
- Symphony Orchestra of the Prague National Theatre.
- Teatr Wielki Orchestra of Warsaw.

== List of recordings ==
=== Recordings of Anton Bruckner's symphonies ===
- Symphonies 00–9, Mass 3, Psalm 146, Organ works (supplemented boxset 2022) – PH 22007
- Symphony in F minor of 1863 – PH 15004 (2016)
- First Symphony – Vienna Version of 1891 – PH19084 (2019)
- First Symphony – Linz version of 1866 (Carragan edition) – PH12022 (2012)
- Symphony in D minor of 1869 – PH15035 (2015)
- Second Symphony – version of 1872 (Carragan edition) – PH12022 (2012)
- Third Symphony – version of 1874 (Carragan edition), premiere recording – PH12022 (2012)
- Third Symphony – version of 1877 (Nowak edition), PH24040 (2025)
- Third Symphony – version of 1890 (Schalk edition), PH18002 (2018)
- Fourth Symphony – version of 1874 – (Edition Schaller) – PH 22010 (2021)
- Fourth Symphony – version of 1878/80 – PH11028 (2011)
- Fourth Symphony – version of 1878/80 with final movement entitled Volksfest (traditional fair) – PH13049 (2013)
- Fifth Symphony – PH14020 (2014)
- Sixth Symphony – PH14021 (2014)
- Seventh Symphony – PH11028 (2011)
- Eighth Symphony – intermediate variant of 1888 (Carragan edition), premiere recording – PH13027 (2013)
- Ninth Symphony – with final movement completed by William Carragan in the 2010 revision – PH11028 (2011)
- Ninth Symphony – completed version; with final movement completed by Schaller (2016), premiere recording; double CD – PH16089 (2016)
- Ninth Symphony – completed version; with final movement completed by Schaller (rev. 2018), double CD – PH18030 (2019)
- Ninth Symphony – completed version; arranged for organ by Gerd Schaller; with final movement completed by Schaller (rev. 2020), double CD – PH21010 (2021)
- Funeral music "To the memory of Anton Bruckner" by Otto Kitzler orchestrated by Schaller, premiere recording – PH13027 (2013)

=== Recordings with the Munich Philharmonic Choir ===
- Karl Goldmark: Merlin, premiere recording – PH09044 (2009)
- Franz von Suppé: Requiem – PH12061 (2012)
- Johann Ritter von Herbeck: Great Mass, premiere recording – PH15003 (2015)
- Anton Bruckner: Mass 3, Psalm 146, Organ works – PH16034 (2016)

=== Other recordings ===
- Ludwig van Beethoven: Symphony no. 3 – PH15030 (2015)
- Ludwig van Beethoven: Symphony no. 4 – PH15030 (2015)
- Ludwig van Beethoven: Symphony no. 7 – PH15030 (2015)
- Karl Goldmark: Symphony no. 1 "Rustic Wedding" - PH10048 (2011)
- Franz Schubert: "Unfinished" Symphony in B minor D759 in the four-movement version of William Carragan, premiere recording – PH12062 (2012)
- Franz Schubert: "Great" Symphony in C major D944 – PH12062 (2012)
