= New York Summer Music Festival =

Coordinates: 42.469°N 75.065°W

The New York Summer Music Festival (NYSMF) was a summer program for young musicians held at SUNY Oneonta that operated from 2006 to 2015. The camp offered workshops with accomplished musicians and attendees performed in dozens of free public concerts during each of the program's two-week sessions. At the end of its 2015 season, the program's Executive Director, Jungeun Kim, announced the NYSMF board's decision not to reopen the camp in 2016.

== Background ==
The festival has provided venues for young musicians in both classical and jazz genres, which has helped to advance studies. Described by the Warwick Advertiser as one of the world's most prestigious youth music programs, it was attended by Caroline Moore, a trained vocalist in the classical and jazz genres. Among the people involved with the festival was well-known Penn State opera singer Blythe Walker. She was the director of vocal studies for the festival. Dr. Nathan Warner who as of August 2014 is a professor of music at Lee University had spent eight years as a constructor of classical trumpet and jazz studies at the festival. Former Nashville Symphony chorus director was serving on the festivals conducting faculty in 2013. Other people who have served on the festivals faculty include New York City-based Saxophonist Roxy Coss, who by 2015 was considered a rising star, the front-woman of the Roxy Coss Quintet.
