= Heinz Lohmann =

German organist and composer (1934–2001)

Heinz Lohmann (8 November 1934 in Gevelsberg – 11 March 2001 in Berlin) was a German organist, editor and composer.

Lohmann studied in Detmold and Paris. He worked as Kirchenmusikdirektor at the church Zum Heilsbronnen in Berlin. He gave concerts at home and abroad. His interpretations have been documented by radio and television recordings. He has composed works for choir, organ, chamber music and Lieder.

== Recordings ==
- Max Reger: Orgelwerke T. 7; Kirche zum Heilsbronnen (1980)
- Max Reger: Orgelwerke T. 8; Kirche zum Heilsbronnen (1980)
- Max Reger: Orgelwerke T. 11; Jesuitenkirche zu Mannheim (1973 / 1979)
- Max Reger: Orgelwerke T. 12; Jesuitenkirche zu Mannheim (1973 / 1978)
- Max Reger: Orgelwerke T. 13; Marktkirche zu Wiesbaden (1974 / 1978)
- Kostbarkeiten barocker Meister; (EMI-Electrola 1979 / 1980)
- Johann Sebastian Bach 1; Steinkirchen (1979)
- Johann Sebastian Bach 2; Altenbruch (1980)
- Johann Sebastian Bach 3; Martinikirche zu Minden (1983)
- Johann Sebastian Bach 4; Martinikirche zu Minden (1983)
- Lotte Backes: Orgelwerke (1977)
- Joseph Rheinberger: Orgelsonaten (1978)
- Organ concert from the island church St. Nikolai on Helgoland (1978)

== Writings ==
- Handbuch der Orgelliteratur. (Breitkopf und Härtel, 1975/ 1980)

== Editions ==
- Gesamtausgabe der Orgelwerke von Johann Sebastian Bach
