= The Summer Music Festival at Roseberry =

Music festival in Idaho, U.S.

The Summer Music Festival at Roseberry Idaho is a music festival, oriented to (but not limited to) folk music, held annually in rural Idaho north of Boise.

The festival was originated by a small group of talented musical, visual and theatrical artists who settled in McCall in the mid-1970s. Drawn to the area because of its sheer natural beauty and, at that time, cheap rent. With the efforts of this unique blend of Raggle-Taggle-Hippies who loved music and family-type gatherings, the free-form nature of this event lent it a special charm that persists to this day. Calling themselves “The Music Circus”. Original members flaunted colorful names such as “Mr. Crow”, “Jazmo”, “Pretty Peggy”, “Beeboo”, “TeePee Nancy”, “Sweet Sue” and “Big Bear” to name a few. This unique congregation was the nucleus of a cultural movement at that time. A movement that was maybe in contrast to, but generally accepted by the numerous loggers and long time ranchers already established in Long Valley.

It all started with a chance meeting between Dan Halkyard (then manager of the Alpine Playhouse) and Pat Harren (a local musician). After some chit-chat, they started into a conversation about maybe putting together a summer music event in McCall. With that small notion, they started looking for others to help make their notion a reality. Employing the work of local artist Kathy Golden to draw up an inspiring first festival poster, then booking the highly regarded “Mores Creek String Band” from Boise to be the main act. And just like that, the first Summer Music Festival was under way!

Originally called The McCall Folk Festival, because Folk Music was the interest of most of the founders, the name has been changed many times throughout the long history of the festival such as: “McCall Folk Music Festival”, “McCall Summer Folk Festival”, “The McCall Music Festival” along with several other variations. The now named “Summer Music Festival at Roseberry” expanded to include all music genres. After quickly outgrowing The Alpine Playhouse, the festival moved first to the McCall-Donnelly High School music room, then to the University of Idaho field campus for many years (known today as M.O.S.S), and finally to its current location in beautiful Historic Roseberry Townsite. With plenty of open space, Roseberry has become an integral part of the event.

While most present day festival venues are tightly controlled, the Summer Music Festival's family-friendly atmosphere encourages personal freedom and responsibility. The festival is a gathering of returning old-timers, locals, and newcomers who harmonize with each other and the music coming from the stage.
