= Elmar Schloter =

German conductor and organist

Elmar Schloter (6 March 1936 – 23 May 2011) was a German organist and conductor.
