= Johann von Herbeck =

Austrian conductor and composer (1831–1877)

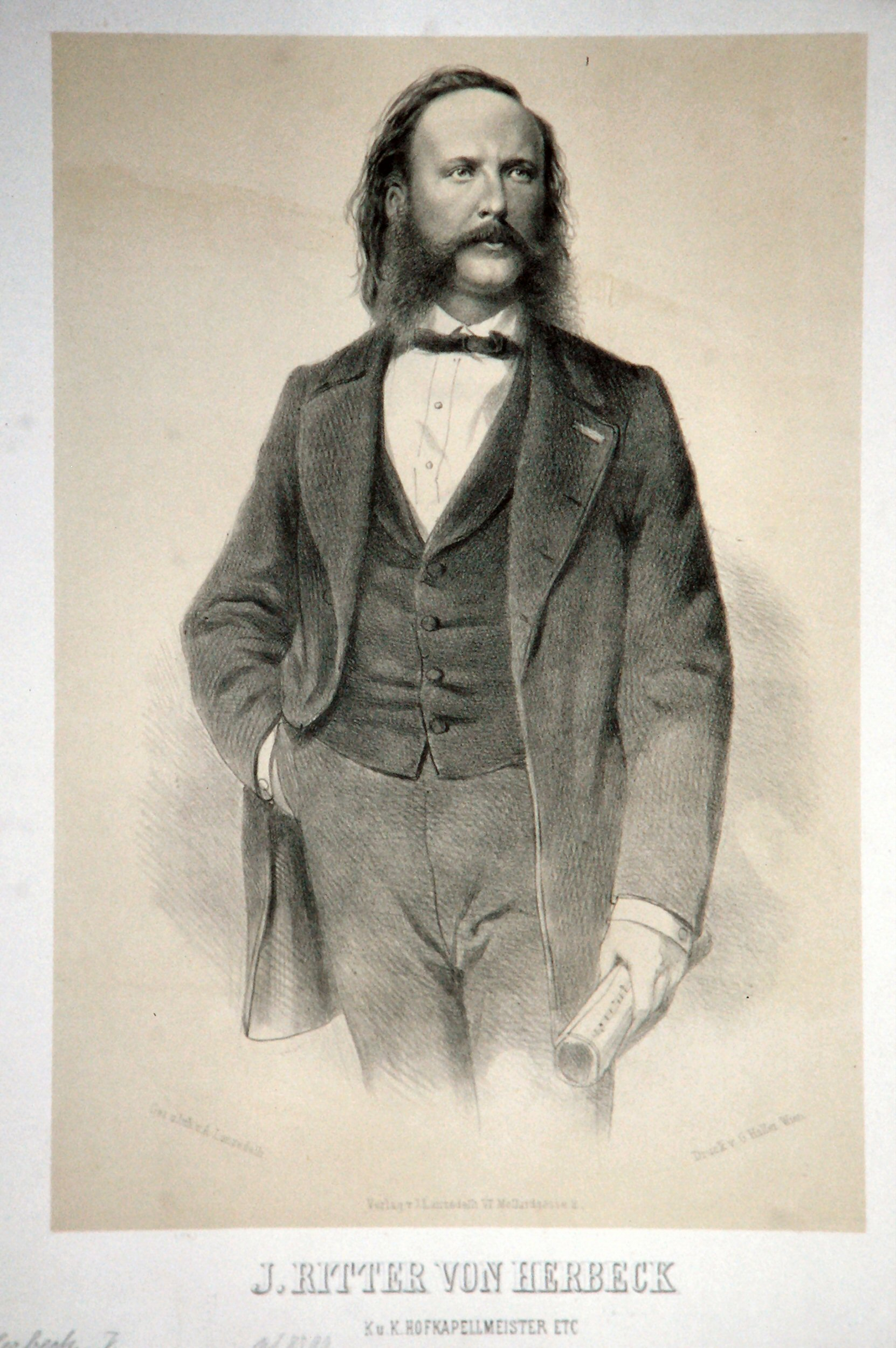
Herbeck in c. 1850

Johann Ritter von Herbeck (25 December 1831 – 28 October 1877) was an Austrian conductor and composer, best known for leading the premiere of Franz Schubert's "Unfinished" Symphony.

== Life and career ==
He was practically a self-educated musician, but by hard work rose rapidly from the position of chorister to that of professor in the Vienna Conservatory. From 1859 to 1870 and again from 1873 to 1877 he conducted the concerts of the Gesellschaft der Musikfreunde, which under his energetic leadership became events of prime importance. In 1866 he was made chief court Kapellmeister and from 1871 to 1875 he was director of the Imperial Opera, resigning over intrigues and annoyances he could not tolerate.

He was a great supporter of the music of Franz Schubert, and conducted the premiere of his "Unfinished" Symphony in 1865. In 1867 he conducted the first three movements of Brahms's A German Requiem. He also conducted the Viennese premiere of Wagner's Die Meistersinger von Nürnberg. He was fairly influential in local musical life for much of his career. He was responsible for Anton Bruckner's appointment in Vienna and was one of his most ardent supporters. Hector Berlioz described him as a first-rate conductor.

He wrote many excellent part-songs and some instrumental music. His orchestral music included Tanzmomente (which Franz Liszt arranged for solo piano, S. 492), Künstlerfahrt, Symphonic Variations and several symphonies, among them a Symphony in D minor with organ (No. 4, his opus 20, published in 1878 posthumously in arrangement ). He also wrote a String Quartet in F, Op. 9, and various other works remain in manuscript. One of his best-loved works is Pueri Concinite, a Christmas motet for boys' choir and solo voice. 1866 he wrote the Great Mass for chorus, organ and orchestra, recorded by the Philharmonic Choir Munich and the Philharmonie Festiva conducted by Gerd Schaller.

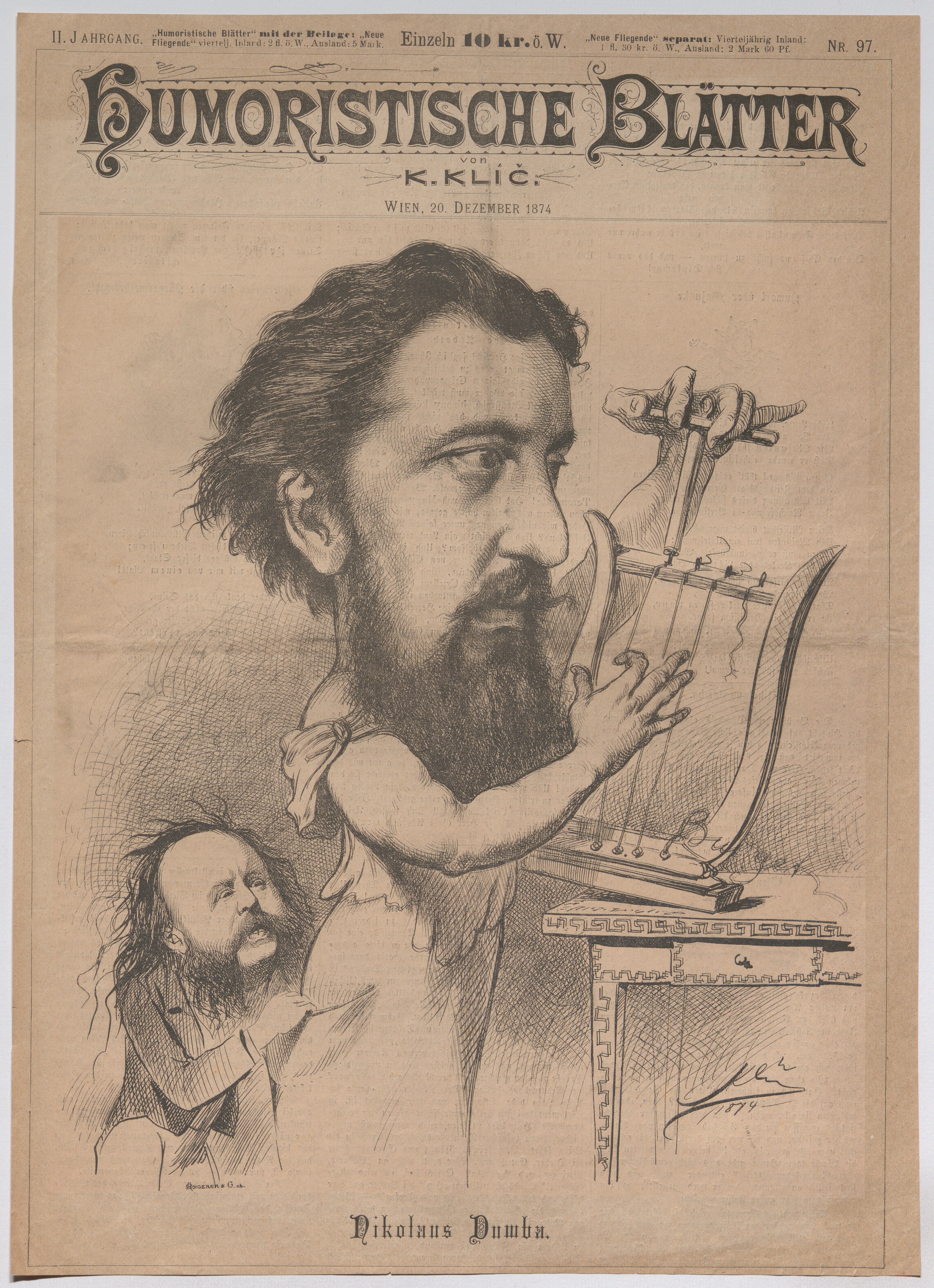
Caricatures of Johann von Herbeck and Nikolaus Dumba in Humoristische Blätter

In 1874, three years before his death, Herbeck was appointed to the third rank of the Iron Crown, which raised him to knighthood, and he was henceforth "Johann Ritter von Herbeck". His son Ludwig wrote a memoir of his father in 1885.
