= Merlin (Goldmark) =

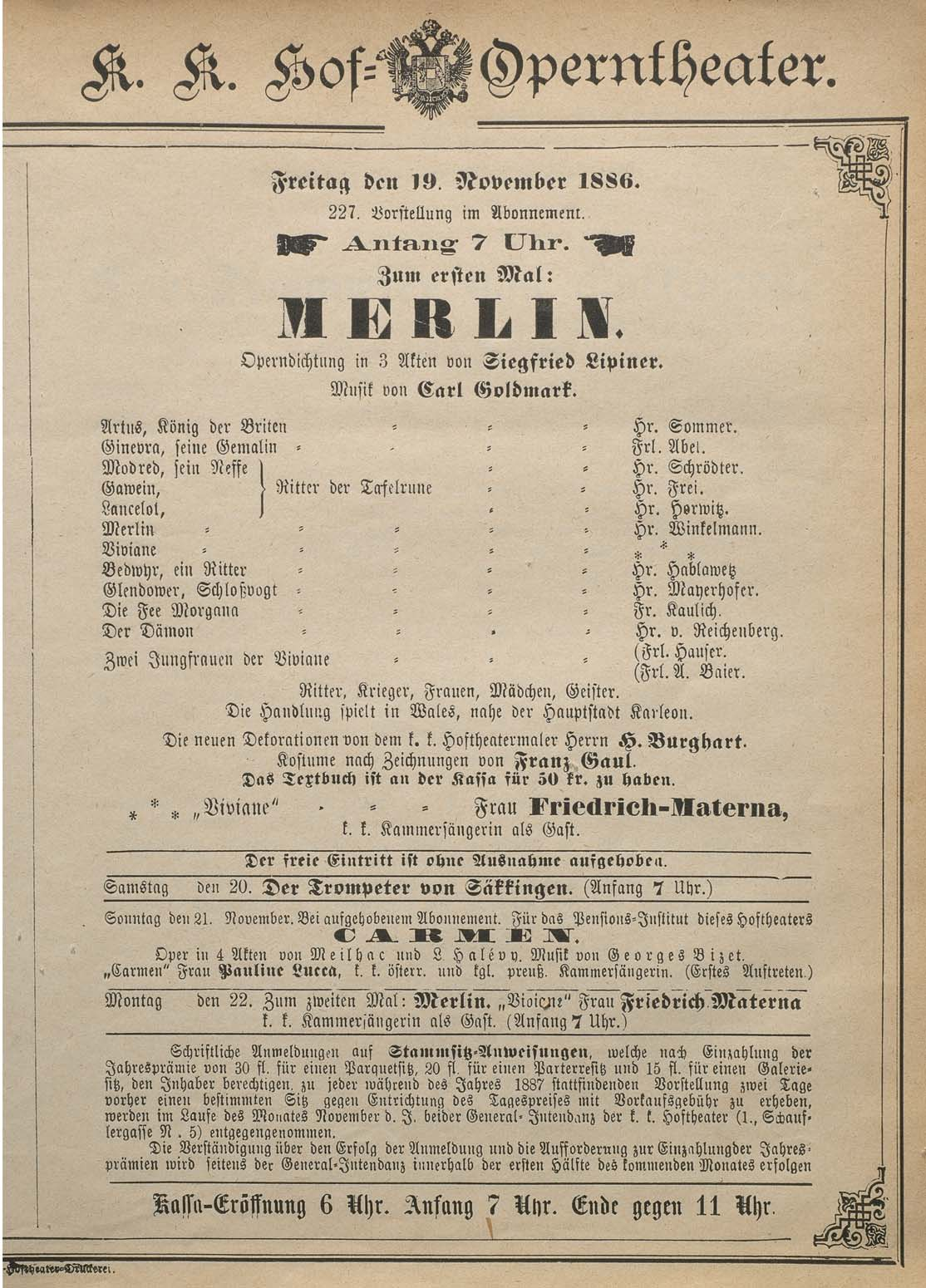
Programme for the 1886 Premiere Production

Merlin is a German-language opera by Karl Goldmark to a libretto by Siegfried Lipiner. It had its premiere at the Wiener Hofoper on November 19, 1886. The Metropolitan Opera gave the American premiere with Lilli Lehmann under Walter Damrosch on January 3, 1887.
