= Philharmonischer Chor München =

The Philharmonischer Chor München (Munich Philharmonic Choir), is a choir founded in 1895 by Franz Kaim in the German city of Munich. Conducted since 1996 by Andreas Herrmann, its repertoire spans a range from the Baroque to operas in concert and large choral works of the 20th century, including major works and also many less known works of sacred and secular concert literature. The choir collaborates with the orchestra Münchner Philharmoniker, and has been conducted by prominent conductors such as Gustav Mahler, Hans Pfitzner, Krzysztof Penderecki, Rudolf Kempe, Herbert von Karajan, Sergiu Celibidache, Carlo Maria Giulini, Seiji Ozawa, Zubin Mehta, Lorin Maazel, Mariss Jansons, James Levine. and Christian Thielemann.
