= Der 100. Psalm =

Music composition by Max Reger

- Choral composition by Max Reger
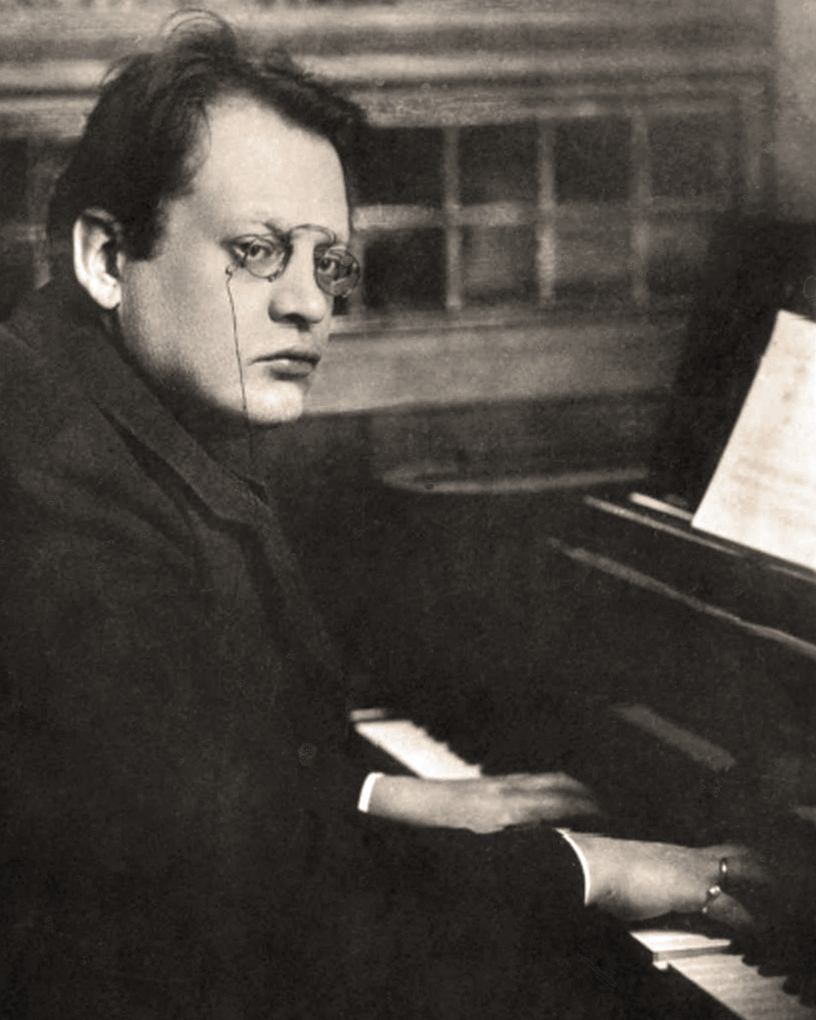
- The composer at the piano, c. 1910
- English: The 100th Psalm
- Key: D major
- Opus: 106
- Occasion: 350th anniversary of the Jena University
- Text: Psalm 100
- Language: German
- Composed: 1908–09
- Dedication: Philosophical Faculty of the Jena University
- Performed: 31 July 1908: Leipzig (Part I); 23 February 1910: Chemnitz; 23 February 1910: Breslau
- Published: 1909: Leipzig by Peters
- Movements: 4
- Scoring: chorus; orchestra; organ

Der 100. Psalm (The 100th Psalm), Op. 106, is a composition in four movements by Max Reger in D major for mixed choir and orchestra, a late Romantic setting of Psalm 100. Reger began composing the work in 1908 for the 350th anniversary of Jena University. The occasion was celebrated that year with the premiere of Part I, conducted by Fritz Stein on 31 July. Reger completed the composition in 1909. It was published that year and premiered simultaneously on 23 February 1910 in Chemnitz, conducted by the composer, and in Breslau, conducted by Georg Dohrn.

Reger structured the text in four movements, as a choral symphony. He scored it for a four-part choir with often divided voices, a large symphony orchestra, and organ. He requested additional brass players for the climax in the last movement when four trumpets and four trombones play the melody of Luther's chorale "Ein feste Burg ist unser Gott". Reger used both late-Romantic features of harmony and dynamics, and polyphony in the Baroque tradition, culminating in the final movement, a double fugue with the added instrumental cantus firmus.

In 1922, the biographer Eugen Segnitz noted that this work, of intense expression, was unique in the sacred music of its period, with its convincing musical interpretation of the biblical text and manifold shades of emotion. Paul Hindemith wrote a trimmed adaption which probably helped to keep the work in the repertory, and François Callebout wrote an organ version, making the work accessible for smaller choirs. The organ version was first performed in 2003, in Wiesbaden where the composer studied. The celebration of the Reger Year 2016, reflecting the centenary of the composer's death, led to several performances of Der 100. Psalm.

== Background ==
Born in Bavaria in 1873, Reger studied at the Wiesbaden Conservatory and worked as a concert pianist and composer. His work focused first on chamber music, Lied, and choral music. In 1898, after he completed his studies, he returned to his parental home and focused on works for organ, continuing the tradition of Johann Sebastian Bach. Though raised as a Catholic, he was inspired by Lutheran hymns, writing chorale fantasias such as Zwei Choralphantasien, Op. 40, in 1899. He moved to Munich in 1901. In 1902 he married Elsa von Bercken, a divorced Protestant. In 1907 Reger was appointed professor at the Royal Conservatory in Leipzig. A year later he began the setting of Psalm 100 with the first movement.

== History ==
Reger wrote the first part of the work for the 350th anniversary of Jena University. He based the composition on Martin Luther's translation of the psalm. Reger composed the first movement in Leipzig, beginning on 24 April 1908 and working on it until early July. He dedicated it "Der hohen Philosophischen Fakultät der Universität Jena zum 350jährigen Jubiläum der Universität Jena" (To the High Faculty of Philosophy of the University of Jena for the 350th anniversary of the university). Part I was first performed on 31 July 1908 at the ceremony marking the 350th anniversary. Fritz Stein conducted the Akademischer Chor Jena and the Sängerschaft zu St. Pauli, the band of the Erfurt Infantry Regiment 71, members of the Weimar court orchestra (Weimarer Hofkapelle) and organist Kurt Gorn. After the first performance, Reger received an honorary doctorate from Jena University. Reger demanded many rehearsals of the conductor and wrote to him:

"Die Hörer des Psalms müssen nachher als 'Relief‘ an der Wand kleben; ich will, dass der Psalm eine niederschmetternde Wirkung bekommt! Also sei so gut und besorge das!" After it’s over the listeners must be stuck to the wall like a relief; I want the psalm to be earth-shaking in its impact! So please be so kind and make it happen!

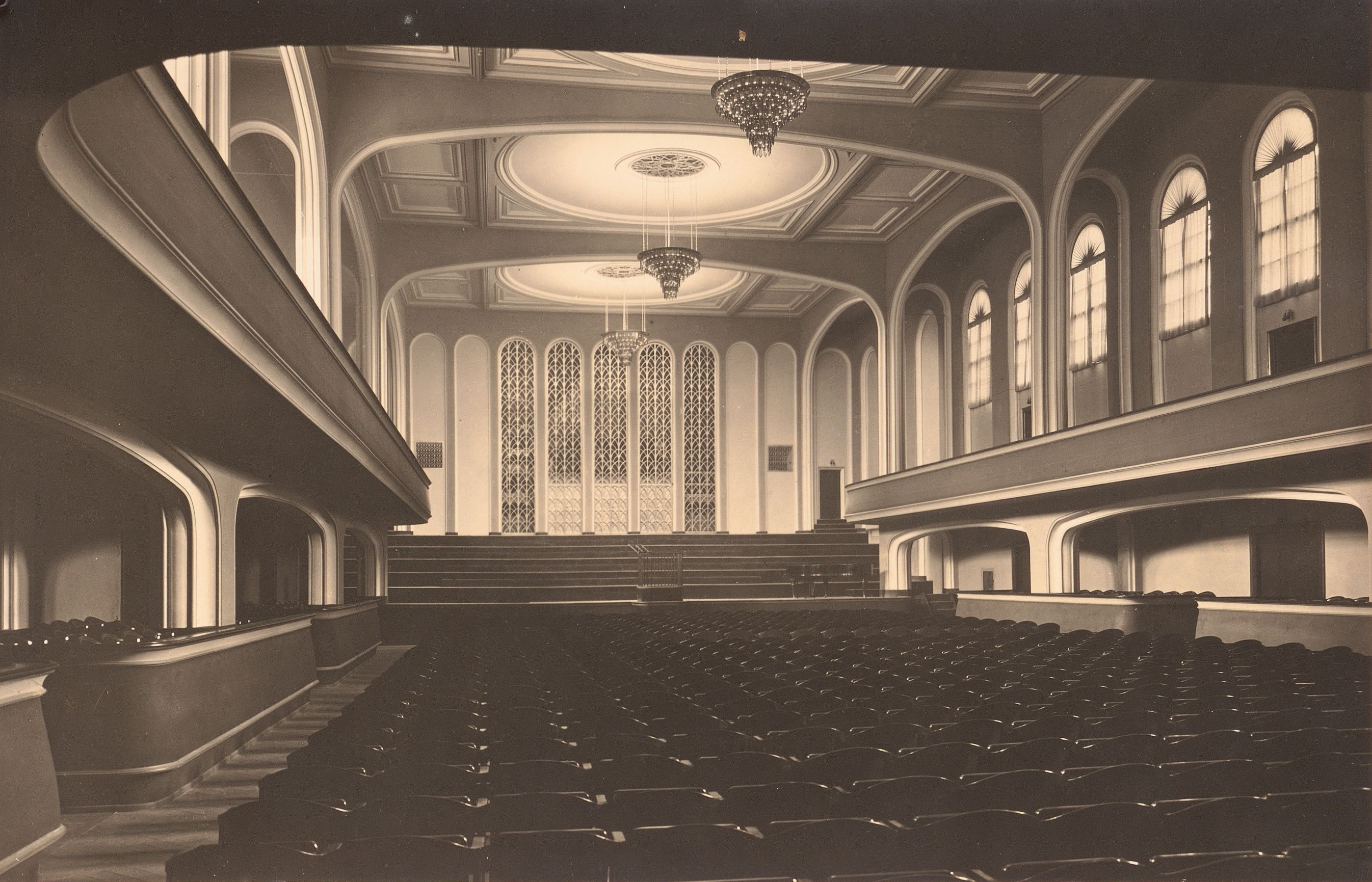
Konzerthaus Breslau, c. 1925

Reger completed the composition of the psalm by adding three more movements from May to August 1909. Edition Peters in Leipzig published the work, beginning in September 1909 with the vocal score, for which Reger prepared the piano reduction. The full score and the parts appeared in December that year. The complete work was premiered simultaneously on 23 February 1910 in Chemnitz and Breslau. In Chemnitz, Reger conducted at the church of St. Lukas the church choir and the municipal orchestra (Städtische Kapelle), with Georg Stolz at the organ. In Breslau, Georg Dohrn conducted the Sing-Akademie and the Orchester-Verein, with organist Max Ansorge. A reviewer wrote in the trade paper Neue Musik-Zeitung:

"Noch unter dem Eindruck des Gehörten, des Miterlebten stehend, ist es mir unsagbar schwer, all das Tiefempfundene, das Erhabene und Göttliche jener Stunde hier zum Ausdruck zu bringen. Man war tief erschüttert, als die gewaltige Doppelfuge verklungen war, hatte etwas Unvergessliches erlebt." Still under the impression of what we heard and experienced, it is unspeakably difficult for me to express here all the deeply experienced, the sublime and divine of that hour. One was deeply shaken, when the gigantic double fugue ended, knowing that one had experienced something unforgettable.

== Psalm 100 and settings ==
The text is Psalm 100, also known as the Jubilate Deo, in the translation by Martin Luther. The rather short psalm calls one to rejoice in the Lord, serve him with gladness, come before his countenance with joy, realize that he made us, and go enter his gates, because he is friendly (Psalm 100).

Luther

Jauchzet dem Herrn alle Welt.
Dienet dem Herrn mit Freuden.
Kommt vor sein Angesicht mit Frohlocken.

Erkennet, dass der Herre Gott ist.
Er hat uns gemacht, und nicht wir selbst,
zu seinem Volk und zu Schafen seiner Weide.

Gehet zu seinen Toren ein mit Danken,
zu seinen Vorhöfen mit Loben.
Danket ihm, lobet seinen Namen,

denn der Herr ist freundlich
und seine Gnade währet ewig
und seine Wahrheit für und für.

Literal translation

Rejoice to the Lord, all world.
Serve the Lord with gladness,
Come before his countenance with joy.

Realize that the Lord is God.
He has made us, and not we ourselves,
as his people and the sheep of his pasture.

Go enter his gates with thanksgiving,
To his courts with praise.
Thank him, praise his name.

For the Lord is friendly;
And his mercy lasts forever,
And his truth for ever and ever.

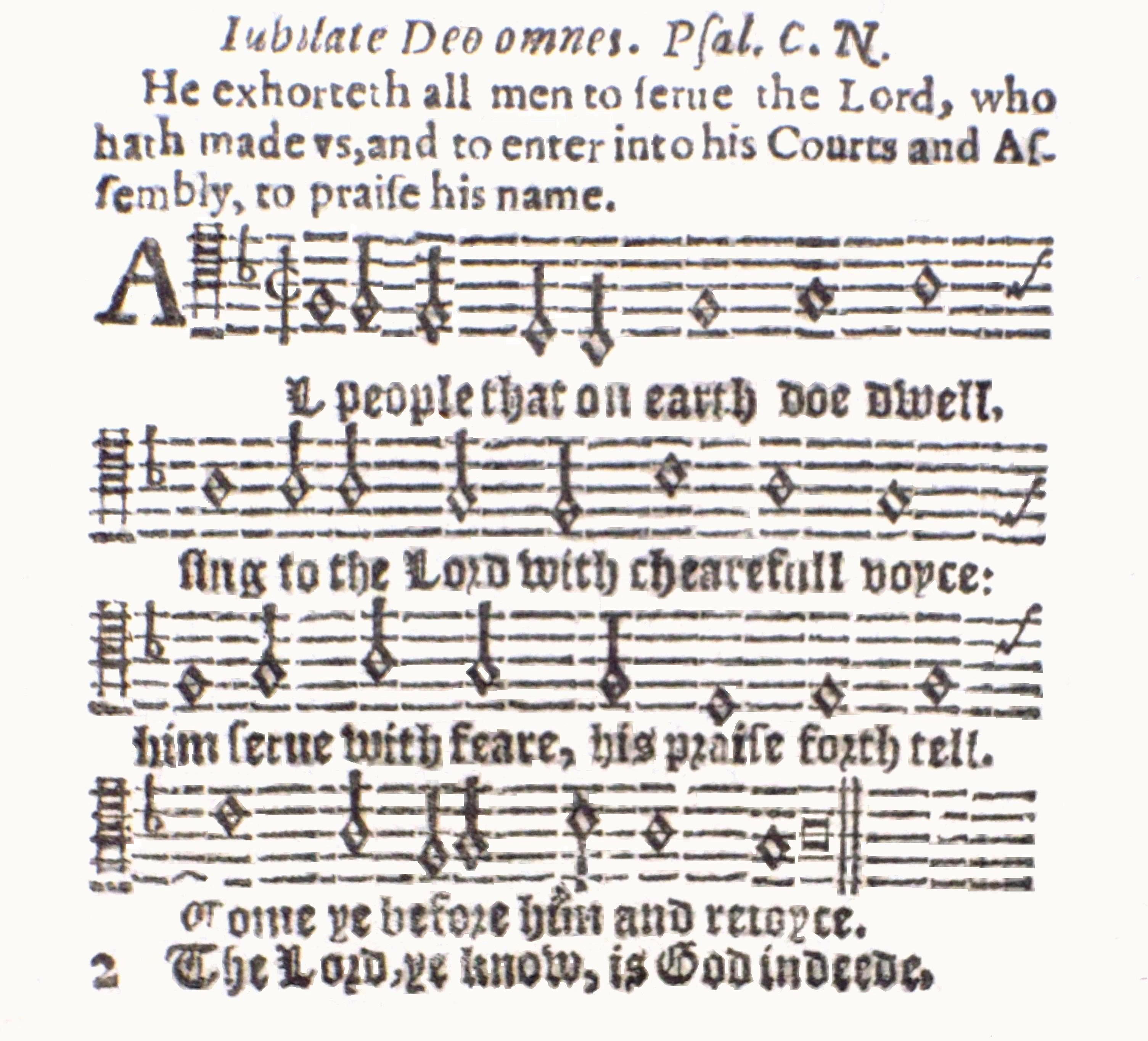
Old Hundredth, Psalm 100, the beginning of a traditional tune in a 1628 print

The call to rejoice leads to music that is especially suitable for festive occasions. The psalm has been set to music many times, mostly for liturgical use, for example by Palestrina (1575) and Lully, who composed a motet, LWV77/16, in honor of the marriage of Louis XIV and peace with Spain in 1660. In England, the Jubilate was traditionally combined with the Te Deum, such as Henry Purcell's Te Deum and Jubilate, and Handel's Utrecht Te Deum and Jubilate. In German, Heinrich Schütz included a setting of Psalm 100, along with an extended setting of Psalm 119 and a Magnificat, in his final collection, known as Opus ultimum or Schwanengesang (Swan song). A pasticcio motet Jauchzet dem Herrn alle Welt includes music by Georg Philipp Telemann and J. S. Bach. The themes of the first psalm verses are paraphrased in the opening movement of Bach's 1734 Christmas Oratorio, Jauchzet, frohlocket!, with a later contrasting section Dienet dem Höchsten mit herrlichen Chören (Serve the Highest with splendid choirs).

Ralph Vaughan Williams, who in 1928 had written an arrangement of the traditional tune associated with the psalm, Old 100th ("All people that on earth do dwell"), arranged it for congregation, organ, and orchestra for the coronation of Elizabeth II in 1953; it became ubiquitous at festive occasions in the Anglophone world. Reger's setting had not been intended for church use; it was written initially for a secular occasion and then for the concert hall.

== Structure and scoring ==
Reger structured the text of the psalm in four movements as a choral symphony, in the typical structure of a symphony: first movement in sonata form (Hauptsatz), slow movement, scherzo, and finale. The following table is based on the choral score and shows the movement number, incipit, the verse(s) of Psalm 100, voices (SATB chorus, at times divided further), marking, key (beginning and ending in D major) and time, using the symbol for common time.

Structure of Reger's Der 100. Psalm
No.	Text	Verse	Vocal	Marking	Key	Time
1	Jauchzet	1,2	SATB	Maestoso (animato)	D major	common time
2	Erkennet	3	SSAATTBB	Andante sostenuto		common time
3	Gehet zu seinen Toren ein	4	SSAATTBB	Allegretto con grazia	F-sharp major – C major	3/4
4	Denn der Herr ist freundlich	5	SATB	Maestoso	D major	common time

The work is scored for a four-part choir, with often divided voices, and an orchestra of two flutes, two oboes, two clarinets, two bassoons, four horns, two trumpets, three trombones, tuba, three timpani and more percussion, organ, and strings. In the final movement, an additional brass ensemble of four trumpets and four trombones plays the cantus firmus of Luther's chorale "Ein feste Burg ist unser Gott". Reger used Lutheran hymns often in his work, in the tradition of Johann Sebastian Bach. He had already written a chorale fantasia on the hymn, Ein' feste Burg ist unser Gott, Op. 27 in 1898. Reger's harmonies are advanced and at times close to atonality, but he claimed that he did nothing that Bach had not done before: harmonies as the result of the polyphonic individual lines (Stimmführung).

All movements are written in D major, but Reger often modulates. The movements follow each other without a break. A short instrumental introduction, marked andante sostenuto, leads into the fourth movement. Reger achieves a unity of form by including material (both text and music) from the first movement in the later ones.

=== 1. Jauchzet ===
The first movement corresponds to the opening movement of a symphony, which is often in sonata form. The movement sets the first two verses of the psalm, which call for three actions: "jauchzet" (rejoice), "dienet" (serve), and "kommt" (come). The three topics match two contrasting themes of the exposition of the sonata form, and its development. They are followed by a recapitulation of the two themes.

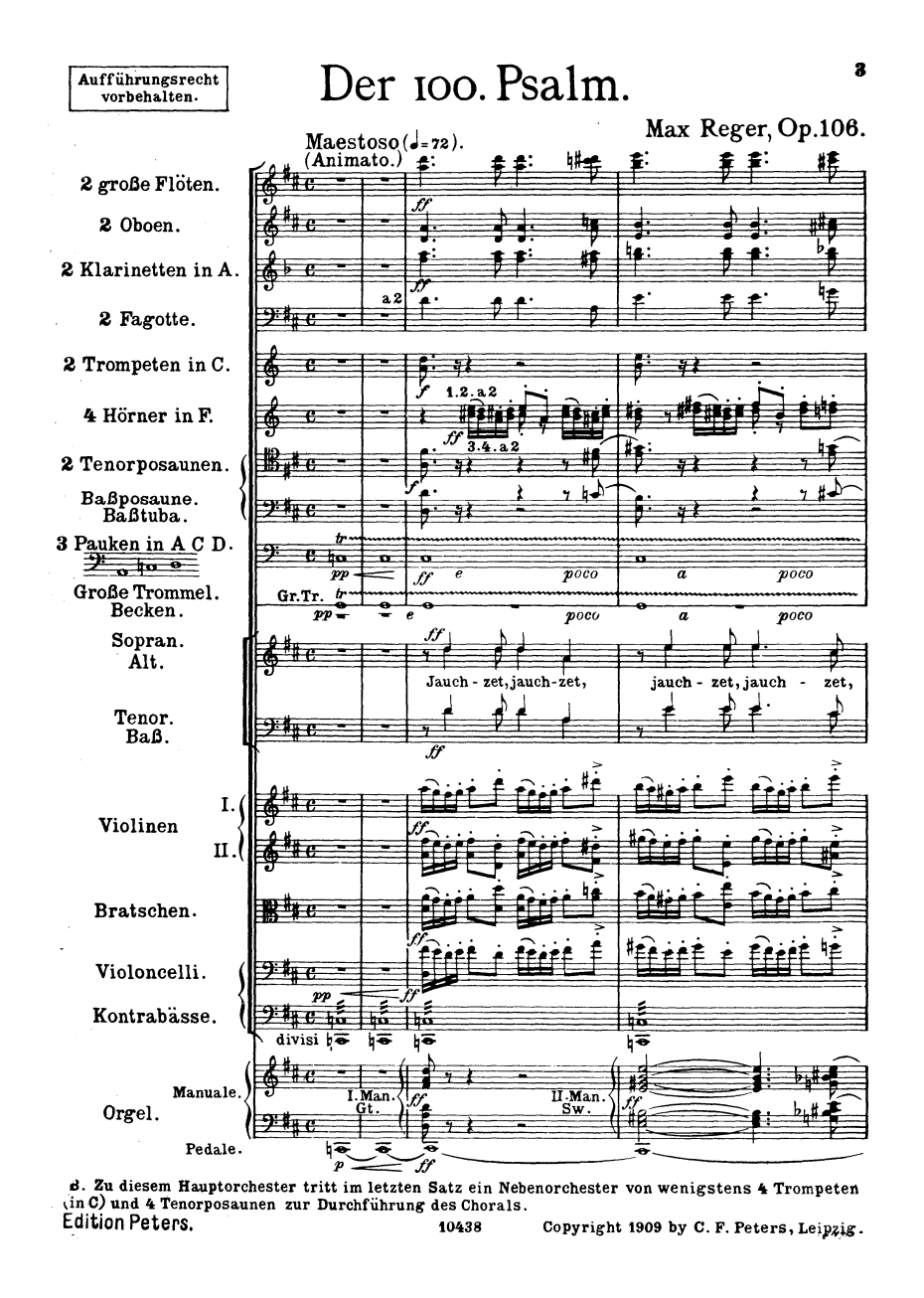
First page of the score in the first edition, 1909

A timpani roll on C of two measures leads to an orchestral D major chord in the third measure, marked ff (fortissimo), and a syncopated entry of the choir one beat later, pronouncing in unison "Jauchzet, jauchzet" (Rejoice, rejoice), the first topic. The choir first sings a motif a fourth downwards, while the strings add a turn motif (Doppelschlag-Motiv) which gets repeated throughout the piece and finally opens a theme of the double fugue in Part 4. The short motifs are treated to upward sequences, then continued in upward scales in triplets, again in sequences, then another upward line in dotted rhythm, but no melody, rendering only the repeated word "jauchzet" with different expression. Fred Kirshnit, who introduced the piece for a performance of the American Symphony Orchestra, regarded the treatment as an "orchestral explosion". The text is continued in measure 16 by "dem Herrn alle Welt" (to the Lord, [of] the whole world).

The following verse begins with "Dienet" (Serve), the second topic. It is quiet, marked sostenuto and pp (pianissimo). It has been compared to the second theme of the sonata form. From the lowest voice to the highest, the material is expanded in imitation, with all voices divided. The phrase "Dienet dem Herrn" is first sung by the alto, and then imitated by the other voices. "Dienet dem Herrn mit Freuden" appears first in the lower voices while the sopranos expand the theme one measure later, marked espressivo and crescendo. Joyful groups of sixteenths appear, first in single voices, then in denser texture, leading to the first topic, "Jauchzet". In measure 111 the third topic appears, "Kommt". This word is repeated many times before the phrase is continued, "vor sein Angesicht" (before his face), later also "mit Frohlocken" (with shouts of joy). In measure 130, a reprise of the first section leads to a close of the movement in a unison "alle Welt", with a fermata on every syllable.

=== 2. Erkennet ===
The second movement begins with a soft instrumental introduction of thirteen measures. Horns and trombones play the same note three times in unison, which is later sung with the word "Erkennet" ("Realize" or Recognize"). Kirshnit writes that the movement begins "mysteriously, almost spectrally". The rhythm dominates the introduction. The choir picks up, singing it first on a unison C, marked ppp (extremely soft). After several repetitions the phrase is continued in measure 26: "dass der Herr Gott ist" (that the Lord is God) with a rapid crescendo from Lord to God. The Swiss musicologist Michael Eidenbenz, writing for the Zürcher Bach Chor, describes the section as mystical and reflective ("mystisch-reflektierend"). In a middle section the divided voices express, mostly in homophony, and gradually more intensely: "Er hat uns gemacht und nicht wir selbst zu seinem Volk" (He has made us, and not we ourselves, his people). The continuation "und zu Schafen seiner Weide" (and the sheep of his pasture) is presented with expression by the lower voices, then repeated by pure triads in A major and B major, first by three soprano parts, then three alto parts, and finally three male voices, with a solo violin.

As a first link to the first movements, the line "He has made us, and not we ourselves, his people" is repeated with the music used for "Dienet dem Herrn mit Freuden", connecting both the musical form and the content of being created God's people and serving him with gladness. The movement closes with a reprise of the first topic, this time ending pianissimo.

=== 3. Gehet zu seinen Toren ein ===
The key of F♯ minor and a triple meter are introduced by the orchestra. The divided female voices express in homophony and "dolcissimo": "Gehet zu seinen Toren ein" (Go enter his gates), with the measure most often divided in a halfnote and a quarter. The male voices answer "Gehet" (Go), and then the female voices repeat their line in a new version. The play is repeated, this time beginning with the male voices. The subsequent text appears in growing density and intensity, modulating constantly, ending in C major.

=== 4. Denn der Herr ist freundlich ===
A short instrumental prelude reprises the orchestral motifs of the beginning of movement 1. Simultaneously, soprano and tenor sing the two themes of a double fugue on the text "Denn der Herr ist freundlich" (For the Lord is friendly). Both themes are lively, but have their fastest movement at different times. The melody of the soprano begins with the turn-motiv from the first movement, while the tenors sing mostly a rising broken D major chord, with fast motion in the second measure. The alto takes the tenor melody, and the bass the soprano melody in their following entry. After an instrumental interlude from measure 77, the themes appear in measure 91 in bass and soprano, while the melody of Luther's "Ein feste Burg ist unser Gott" is played by brass in unison. The work ends, slowing down majestically, with the text "und seine Wahrheit für und für" (and his truth forever and ever).

=== Evaluation ===
The biographer Eugen Segnitz wrote in 1922 that the work was not only unique in the composer's work, but in the sacred music of its period, with a rare intense power of expression ("intensive Ausdruckskraft") and a convincing musical exegesis of the biblical text, as well as its turns and manifold shades of emotion ("überzeugende musikalische Auslegung des biblischen Textes, wie auch seiner Wendungen und mannigfaltigen Gefühlsschattierungen").

A reviewer of a recording noted the work's "quasi-symphonic sequence" and its "balanced overall shape which brings musical satisfaction even though the choral-orchestral presentation is at times somewhat unrelenting". Eidenbenz noted that Reger achieved a direct expressivity of the smallest entities of material ("unmittelbare Expressivität kleinster Materialteile"), and saw in this "atomization" and relentless modulation a modern radicality ("moderne Radikalität"). He then wrote:

Expressivität statt Verstehbarkeit, die Intention einer 'Druckwelle', die das Publikum zum Relief macht, die unaufhörliche Modulation, die äusserliche Opulenz und die innere kalkulierte Logik, die naive und unhinterfragte Selbstverständlichkeit seiner Musik, Expressivity instead of understandability, the intention of a shock wave making the audience a relief, relentless modulation, external opulence and inner calculated logic, the naïve and unquestioned naturalness of his music ..."

Eidenbenz noted how these elements also characterize Reger's life.

== Versions ==
In 1955, Paul Hindemith revised the work to achieve more clarity. According to Wolfgang Rathert, Hindemith "sought to moderate Reger's 'uncontrolled invention'", while Kirshnit described Reger's original scoring as "gloriously polychromatic". Hindemith "thinned" the orchestra, especially the horns. In Reger's scoring, the organ reinforced the voices throughout the piece, resulting in a lack of clarity for the polyphonic passages. Hindemith used the organ only for climaxes. In the double fugue, he assigned one theme to a voice, but the other simultaneous theme to the orchestra. Hindemith's approach, which enables more analytical listening, seems justified by Reger's own scoring of later compositions which were more refined and focused. It is probably due to his version that Der 100. Psalm enjoyed continuous presence in concert halls, while other works by Reger were neglected.

François Callebout wrote an organ version that was published in 2004 by Dr. J. Butz. Gabriel Dessauer explains in the preface that Reger's work was conceived for oratorio choirs of up to 500 singers at the beginning of the 20th century. The organ version enables smaller choirs to perform the music. This version was premiered in 2003 by the Reger-Chor in St. Bonifatius, Wiesbaden, the parish to which the composer belonged during his studies in Wiesbaden. The organ was played by Ignace Michiels, organist at the St. Salvator Cathedral in Bruges.

Hanns-Friedrich Kaiser, KMD (director of church music) in Weiden, where Reger grew up, wrote a version for choir and organ, which he conducted at the opening of the festival Reger-Tage at the church St. Michael on 16 September 2012, with organist Michael Schöch.

== Reger Year ==
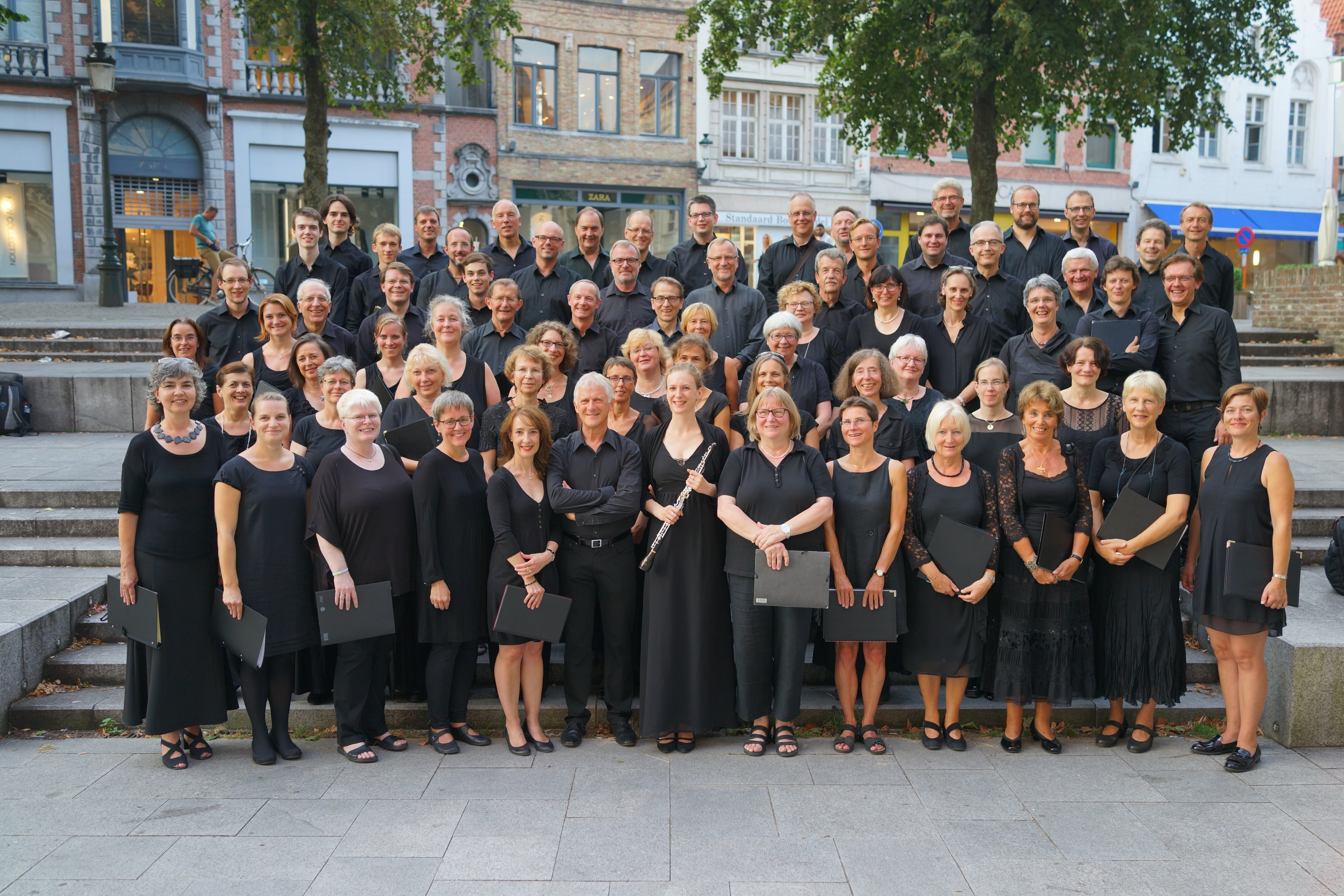
Reger-Chor, August 2016 in Bruges before a performance of the organ version, with the organist in the first row

In 2016, a Reger Year reflecting the centenary of Reger's death, the work was performed at the Thomaskirche in Leipzig on 11 May, on his day of death in the town where he died. The Thomanerchor, the Leipziger Universitätschor and the MDR Sinfonieorchester were conducted by David Timm. The concert was repeated on 26 May at the same location for the Katholikentag.

On 13 May, the MDR aired a live concert recording from 1984 at the Kreuzkirche in Dresden, performed by the Dresdner Kreuzchor, the Philharmonischer Chor Dresden, the Rundfunkchor Berlin, organist Michael-Christfried Winkler, and the Dresdner Philharmonie, conducted by Martin Flämig. In June, the Kaiser conducted again his organ version in St. Michael in Weiden, with the Kantorei Weiden and organist Ute Steck. The Reger-Chor performed the organ version by Callebout in Bruges and Wiesbaden in August, again with Dessauer and Michiels.

== Recordings ==
Recordings of Der 100. Psalm (Reger)
Title	Conductor / Choir / Orchestra	Soloists	Label	Year
Max Reger – Der 100. Psalm (Präludium und Fuge, Op. 85/4 Te Deum, Op. 59)	Wolfram Röhrig Gemischter Chor des Nürnberger Lehrergesangvereins / Rolf Beck Nürnberger Symphoniker	Werner Jacob (organ)	SABA	1967
Die Weihe der Nacht, Op. 119 / Der 100. Psalm / Weihegesang	Horst Stein Chor der Bamberger Symphoniker Bamberger Symphoniker	Fritz Walter-Lingquist (organ)	Koch Schwann	1995
Max Reger: Der 100. Psalm; Der Einsiedler; Requiem (Hebbel)	Klaus Uwe Ludwig Bachchor Wiesbaden Bachorchester Wiesbaden	Wolf Kalipp	Melisma (recorded live in the Lutherkirche, Wiesbaden)	2000
Reger: Psalm 100, etc. (Hindemith arrangement)	Valeri Polyansky State Symphony Capella of Russia State Symphony Orchestra of Russia		Chandos	2002
Der 100. Psalm (organ version)	Gabriel Dessauer Reger-Chor	Ignace Michiels (organ)	live recording of the premiere	2003
Reger - Timm: 100th Psalm - Jazzmesse	Georg Christoph Biller Leipzig University Choir Gewandhausorchester		Querstand	2014

== Sources ==
=== Scores ===
- Psalm 100, Op.106 (Reger, Max): Scores at the International Music Score Library Project
- 100. Psalm: op. 106 : für SATB und Orgel (in German). Bonn: Dr. J. Butz. 2004.
- Reger, Max (1992). Der 100. Psalm: für gemischten Chor, Orchester und Orgel; opus 106 (in German). Edition Peters.
- Reger, Max; Dessauer, Gabriel (2004). Max Reger / 1873–1916 / Der 100. Psalm (vocal score) (in German). Bonn: Dr. J. Butz.

=== Max-Reger-Institut ===
- "Curriculum vitae". Max-Reger-Institute. Archived from the original on 28 September 2015.
- "Der 100. Psalm Op. 106" (in German). Max-Reger-Institute.

=== Books ===
- Dürr, Alfred; Jones, Richard D. P. (2005). The Cantatas of J. S. Bach: With Their Librettos in German-English Parallel Text. Oxford University Press. p. 102. ISBN 978-0-19-816707-5.
- Luttmann, Stephen (2013). Paul Hindemith: A Research and Information Guide (2, revised, annotated ed.). Routledge. ISBN 978-1-13-584841-5.
- Melamed, Daniel R. (1995). J. S. Bach and the German Motet. Cambridge University Press. pp. 89–97. ISBN 978-0-52-141864-5.
- Rathey, Markus (2016). "Dichotomy (Part I)". Johann Sebastian Bach's Christmas Oratorio: Music, Theology, Culture. Oxford University Press. pp. 144–147. ISBN 978-0-19-027526-6.
- Schaarwächter, Jürgen (2014). Reger, Max / Der 100. Psalm Op. 106, Original version for chorus, orchestra and organ (Vocal Score / German & English text). repertoire-explorer.musikmph.de. pp. preface.
- Segnitz, Eugen (2013) [1922]. Max Reger (in German). Berlin: Europäischer Literaturverlag. p. 101. ISBN 978-3-86-267670-5.
- Spitta, Philipp (2014) [1880]. "Weihnachts-Oratorium". Johann Sebastian Bach. Eine Biografie in zwei Bänden (in German). Vol. 2. Severus. pp. 403–405. ISBN 978-3-86-347906-0.
- Stein, Fritz (1927). Zur Entstehungsgeschichte des 100. Psalms von Max Reger: Persönl. Erinnergn (in German). Böhme.

=== Journals ===
- "Max Reger Choral Works". Gramophone. 1996.
- "Reger Psalm 100, Op 106; Variations on a Theme of Mozart / A fine introduction to Reger's unjustly neglected works for choir and orchestra". Gramophone. 2002.
- "Music for the Coronation". The Musical Times. 94 (1325). Bach Digital: 305–307. 1953. doi:10.2307/933633. JSTOR 933633.

=== Newspapers ===
- "'Niederschmetternd' / Eine Reger-Uraufführung in St. Bonifatius" (in German). Wiesbadener Kurier. 8 September 2003.
- Wenda, Manuel (5 September 2016). "Mit epischer, druckvoller Wucht – Regerchor-International singt in St.Bonifatius zum 100. Todesjahr von Max Reger" (in German). Wiesbadener Tagblatt. Archived from the original on 6 September 2016.

=== Online sources ===
- Barfoot, Terry (2009). "Max Reger (1873–1916) / Four Tone Poems after Böcklin, Op. 128". musicweb-international.com.
- Eidenbenz, Michael Eidenbenz. "M. Reger: / 100. Psalm" (PDF). Zürcher Bach Chor (in German). pp. 42–47. Archived from the original (PDF) on 17 October 2016.
- Kirshnit, Fred (2006). "Max Reger, Psalm 100, Op. 106". American Symphony Orchestra. Archived from the original on 4 June 2016.
- Range, Matthias (2007). "Schütz – the "Final Work"". Mundoclasico. Archived from the original on 2014-02-03.
- "Jauchzet dem Herrn alle Welt BWV Anh. 160; TWV 8:10; 1:1066; BC C 7; BNB II/T/7 / Motet". Bach Digital. 2016.
- "Leipziger Universitätschor gedenkt Max Regers mit Festkonzert". Leipzig (in German). 4 May 2016.
- "Max Reger: Der 100. Psalm op.106 / Aufzeichnung aus der Kreuzkirche Dresden 1984". MDR (in German). Archived from the original on 16 June 2016.
- "Die Weihe der Nacht, Op. 119 / Der 100. Psalm / Nachtgesang". archive.org. 1995.
- "Max Reger in Leipzig". leipzig-lese.de (in German). 2016.
- "Leipziger Universitätschor gedenkt Max Regers mit Festkonzert". Leipziger Universitätschor (in German). 3 May 2016.
- "Reger: The 100th Psalm, Der Einsieder, Requiem / Ludwig, Etc". arkivmusic.com. 2000. Archived from the original on 16 September 2016.
- Jubilate Deo . LWV 77/16 / motet (in French). 1660 – via French National Library.
- "Discography". Ignace Michiels. 2016.
- "Don Fernando de Las Infantas, teólogo y músico. Estudio crítico biobibliográfico". archive.org (in Spanish).
- "Reger: Psalm 100". prestoclassical.co.
- "Festkonzert zum 100. Todestag von Max Reger". reger-in-leipzig.de. 2016. Archived from the original on 16 July 2016.
- "Max Reger – Der 100. Psalm". discogs.com. 1967.
- "Max Reger – Der 100. Psalm". searchworks.stanford.edu. 2016.
- "Eröffnungskonzert". maxregertage.de (in German). 16 September 2012. Archived from the original on 18 November 2017.
- "Max-Reger-Jahr 2016". www.dekanat-weiden-evangelisch.de (in German). 3 June 2016. Archived from the original on 2017-11-18.
