= Die Weihe der Nacht =

- Choral composition by Max Reger
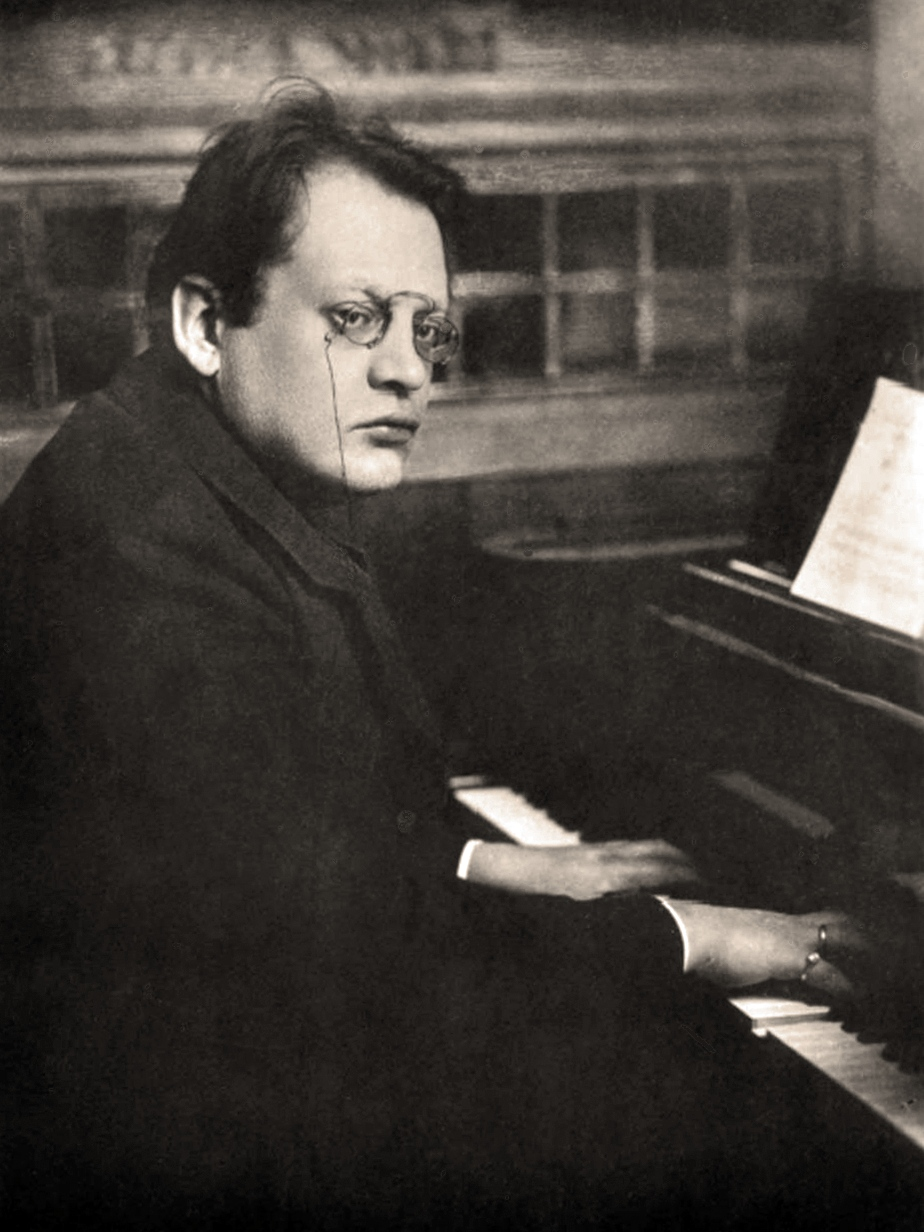
- The composer in 1910
- Opus: 119
- Language: German
- Composed: 1911
- Dedication: Gertrud Fischer-Maretzki
- Published: 1911: Berlin
- Scoring: alto; men's choir; orchestra

Die Weihe der Nacht (The Consecration of the Night), Op. 119, is a choral composition for alto, men's choir and orchestra by Max Reger, setting a poem by Friedrich Hebbel. He composed it in Leipzig in 1911 and dedicated it to Gertrud Fischer-Maretzki, the soloist in the first performance. It was published by Ed. Bote & G. Bock in Berlin the same year.

== History ==
Reger composed the work in Leipzig in 1911, where he worked as a professor at the conservatory. During this period he also composed Eine Lustspielouvertüre, Op. 120, the String Quartet in F-sharp minor, Op. 121, and the Violin Sonata, Op. 122, among others. It was published the same year by Ed. Bote & G. Bock in Berlin, the vocal score in July, the parts in September. The work was first performed in Berlin on 12 October 1911 by Gertrud Fischer-Maretzki, members of the Domchor Berlin and the Berliner Philharmonisches Orchester, conducted by Leonid Kreutzer.

Gertrud Fischer-Maretzki (1886–1929) was among the contraltos who inspired Reger, along with Anna Erler-Schnaudt. He met her first in 1905, and wrote about her in 1910: "Die Dame hat [...] stets durch ihre prachtvolle Stimme u. tiefdurchdachten, echt musikalischen Vortrag die vollste Anerkennung bei Publikum u. Kritik gefunden." (The lady always found complete recognition of audience and critics by her magnificent voice and her deeply reasoned and genuinely musical performance.)

Reger set another poem by Hebbel, "Requiem", which he had considered in 1910 already, in 1912 for men's choir a cappella, in 1915 for soloist, mixed choir and orchestra, the Hebbel Requiem. The poem "Die Weihe der Nacht" was also set by composers such as Harald Genzmer, Walter Rein and Hilding Rosenberg.

== Music ==
Reger scored the composition for an (alto soloist, a men's choir (TTBB), and an orchestra of two flutes, two oboes, two clarinets, two bassoons, four horns, two trumpets, trombone, three timpani and strings, a scoring similar to that chosen by Brahms for his Alto Rhapsody. The poem begins with the lines "Nächtliche Stille! Heilige Fülle" (Nocturnal silence! Holy fulness). The composition is initially marked Adagio and opens with a slow orchestral passage. Reger uses in his setting chromaticism, ambiguous harmonies, and word painting. The rendering of daybreak has been compared to that in the Alpine Symphony by Richard Strauss. Die Weihe der Nacht thus foreshadows Reger's program music such as Vier Tondichtungen nach A. Böcklin, Op. 128.

The work was recorded in 1995 by the Bamberger Symphoniker and their choir, conducted by Horst Stein and with Lioba Braun as the soloist and Fritz Walter-Lingquist as the organist, along with Reger's Der 100. Psalm and Weihegesang.

== Bibliography ==
- Eckle, Georg-Albrecht (2016). "Aus dem Reich der Toten / Max Reger und "sein" Requiem" (in German). Bayerischer Rundfunk.
- Grim, William (2004). "Die Weihe der Nacht für Altsolo, Männerchor und Orchester, Op. 119 / (The Consecration of the Night for Alto Solo, Male Choir and Orchestra, Op. 119) / Preface" (in German). repertoire-explorer.musikmph.de.
- "Max Reger / Die Weihe Der Nacht / Psalm 100 / Weihegesang". Koch Classics. 1995.
- "Max Reger Curriculum vitae". Max-Reger-Institute. Archived from the original on 28 September 2015.
- "Reger, Max: Die Weihe der Nacht op. 119 16' / for alto, male chorus and orchestra". Boosey & Hawkes.
- "Reger und die Altstimme" (PDF). Mitteilungen No. 7 (in German). Internationale Max Reger Gesellschaft. 2003.
- "An die Hoffnung Op. 124 / für Alt, 2 Fl, 2 Ob, 2 Kl, 2 Fg, 4 Hr, 2 Trp, 3 Pk, Streicher" (in German). Max-Reger-Institute. 2017.
- "Die Weihe der Nacht" (in German). Der Spiegel. 2017. Archived from the original on December 29, 2014.
