= Röhrig (surname) =

Röhrig is a surname. People include:

- Alysia Roehrig, American psychologist
- Géza Röhrig (born 1967), Hungarian actor and poet
- Kenneth William Roehrig (1907–1969), American architect in Hawaii
- Josef Röhrig (1925–2014), German footballer
- Udo Röhrig (born 1943), East German handball player
- Walter Röhrig (1897–1945), German art director
- Wolfram Röhrig (1916–1998), German jazz pianist, choral conductor, director of a broadcaster department, composer
