= Lisy Fischer =

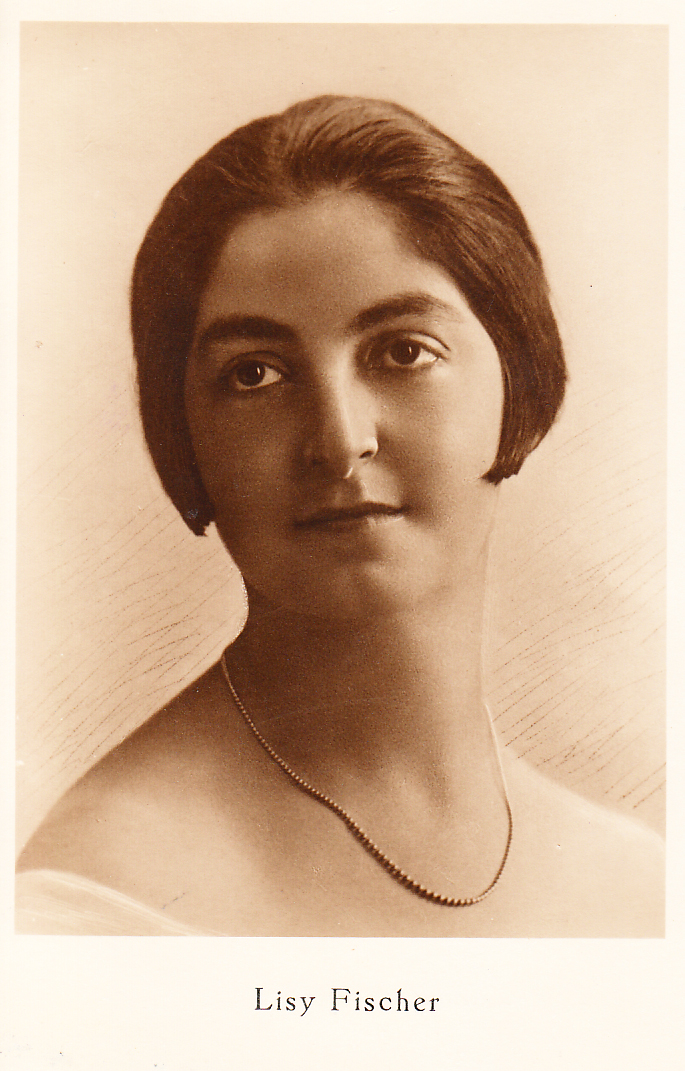

Background information
- Birth name: Elisabeth Fischer
- Born: 22 August 1900; Zurich, Switzerland
- Died: 6 June 1999 (aged 98); Newcastle upon Tyne, England
- Occupation(s): Musician, teacher
- Instrument: Piano

Elisabeth (Lisy) Fischer (born 22 August 1900 in Zurich – died 6 June 1999 in Newcastle upon Tyne) was a Swiss pianist from a talented Jewish family. Born to parents Arthur Fischer (from Deutsch Eylau, Prussia - now Iława, Poland) and Bertha Hochstetter (from Liedolsheim, Germany), she was a child prodigy giving piano recitals from 11 years of age first in Geneva and afterwards in Paris under the tutelage of Lucien Grou de Flagny and later Charles Barbier.

== Early life and career ==
Later as a teenager she played both as a soloist as well as with other musicians, giving concerts in Germany, where she studied from 15 years of age, and in Switzerland. She studied at the Stern Conservatory of Music in Berlin under Professor Martin Krause, Rudolf Maria Breithaupt and Professor Wilhelm Klatte where she was awarded the Professor Gustav Hollaender Medal in 1920, a few years after her fellow student, Claudio Arrau.

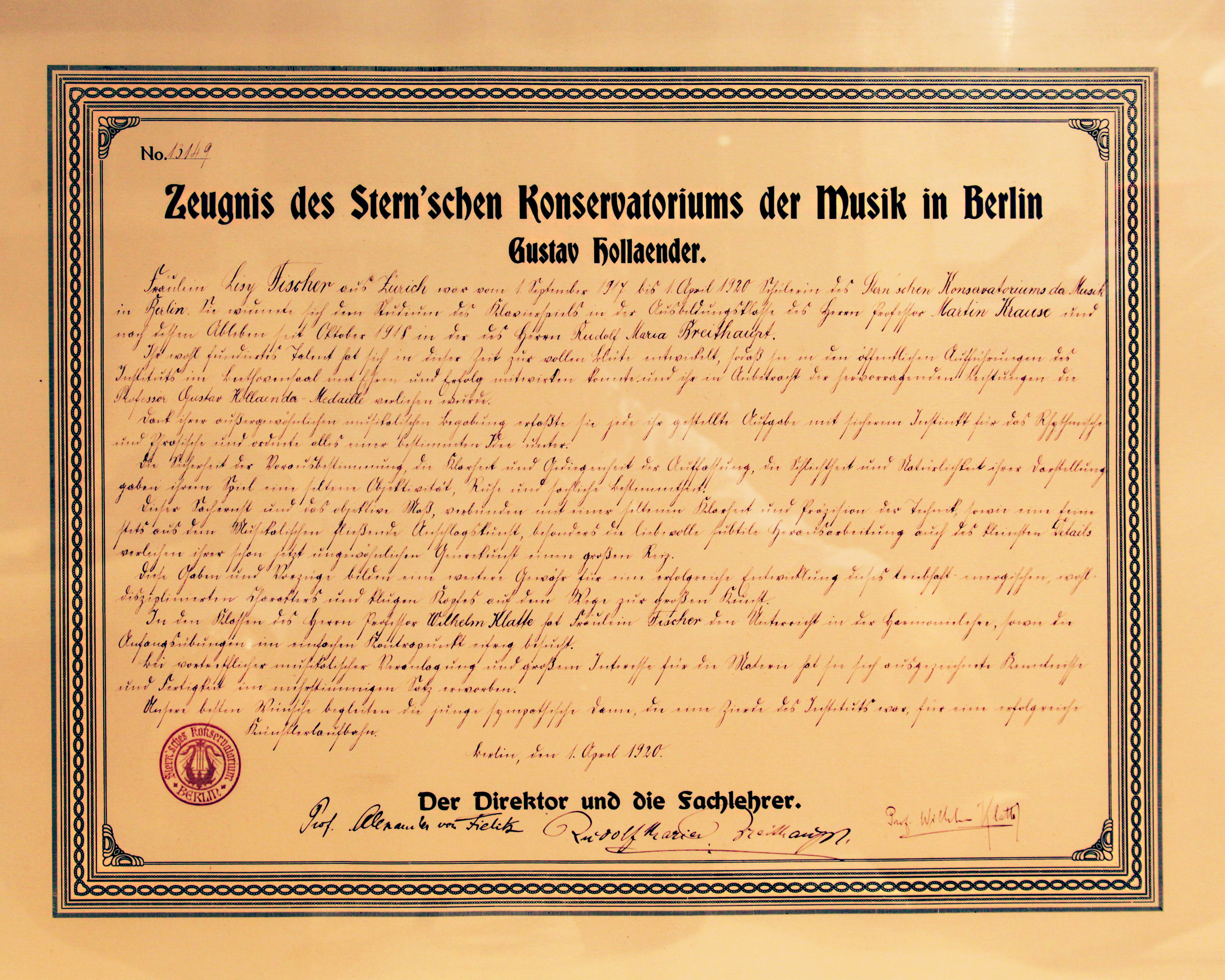
Certificate No: 13149 from the Stern Conservatory, Berlin to Miss Lisy Fischer dated April 1, 1920

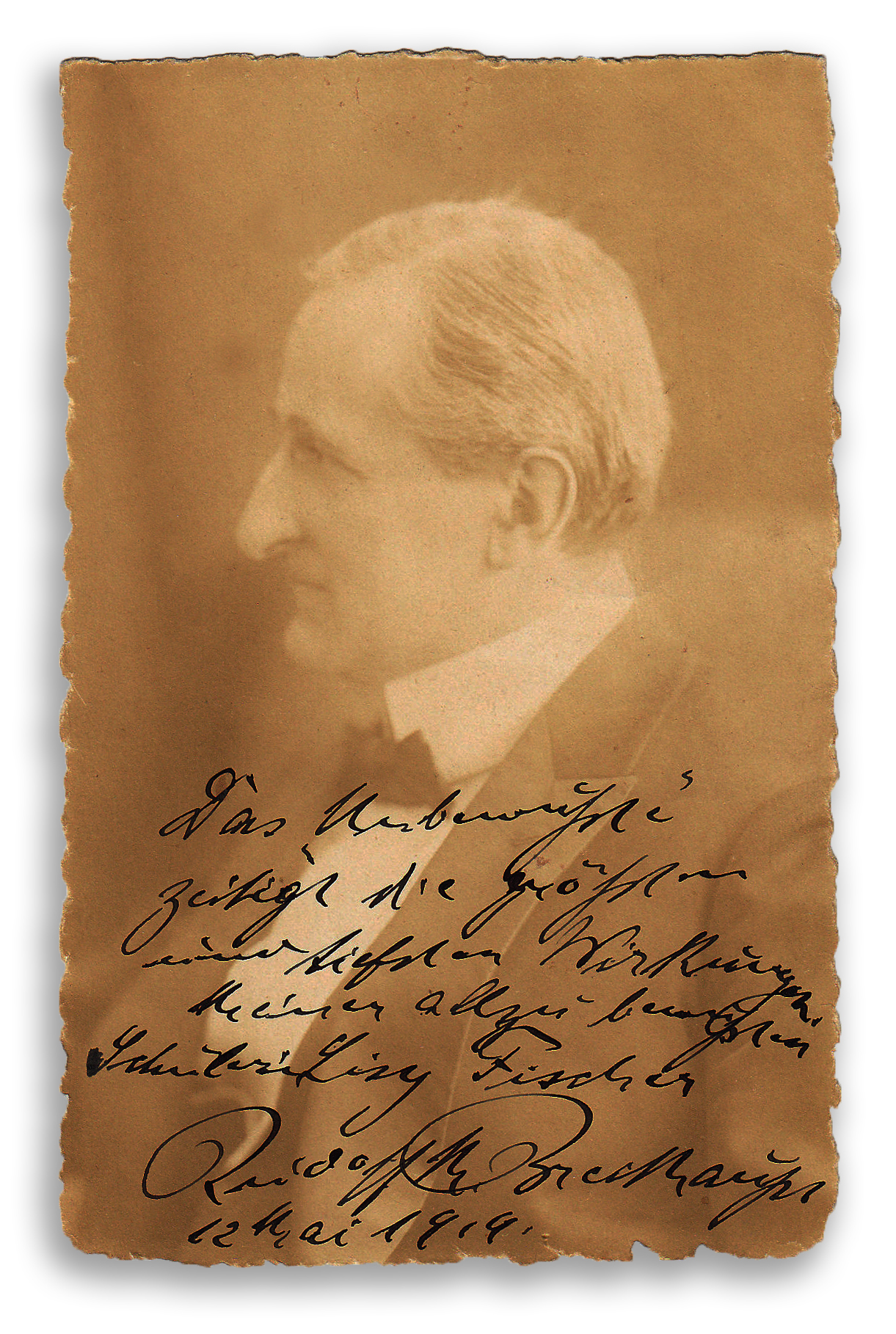
Rudolf Maria Breithaupt

An extract of the citation signed by the Director Professor Alexander von Fielitz and her teachers reads "Her predetermination, the clarity and purity of her comprehension, the simplicity and natural manner of her performance, give her rendition a rare objectivity, calmness and technical competence. Her sincerity and purpose combined with a rare clarity and technical precision, as well as a fine musical dexterity, a loving and subtle extraction of every small detail give this new and unusual recital technique a compelling charm. These abilities further enhance the continued development of Miss Fischer’s compulsive, energetic and well disciplined character and clever mind on its way to a great artistic talent”.

On 14 March 1919 the Director of the Stern Conservatory, Professor Alexander von Fielitz, wrote a letter 'to whom it may concern' seeking sponsorship for her as a talented pianist. He says in this letter that because of the war, her family are unable to assist her financially and she is having to teach in order to fund her living which is hindering her development.

Her teacher, Rudolf Breithaupt, had a special affinity towards her and wrote a personal note to her over his photograph on May 12, 1919 "The unconscious produces the greatest and most profound effects. To my student, Lisy Fischer, who is very conscious of what she is doing."

== Concerts and critics ==
An example of Lisy Fischer's published reviews:

Date	Publication	Extract of Published Reviews
26 March 1912	Le Genevois	“Mature artistic temperament, impeccable technique, light touch and a fine and delicate style”
10 February 1913	ABC	“She is destimed to become a major artist once she has grown so her feet can reach the pedals”
15 June 1915	La Suisse	“Miss Fischer demonstrated a gracious and even brilliant technique”
6 July 1917	Allgemeine Musik Zeitung	“Lisy Fischer, still a doll and on her way to become a butterfly, exhibits very fine tone and rhythm”
21 January 1919	Berliner Mittagszeitung	“An extraordinary talent was displayed by the childlike, young pianist, Lisy Fischer”
7 January 1920	Berliner Börsen Courier	“Her technique is well groomed, her touch gentle and she plays with great sensitivity and understanding. She showed the individuality of her own personality”
27 November 1920	Crossener Tageblatt	“She carries the name of the best and most famous living pianist – Edwin Fischer. She shares with him much more than great skill - the concept of great art. An unusual ability and skill join these two persons. Through mature aspiration in a rich artistic personality she already demonstrates great individuality to satisfy the audience. Miss Fischer is a child prodigy (Wunderkind) in the best sense of the word”.

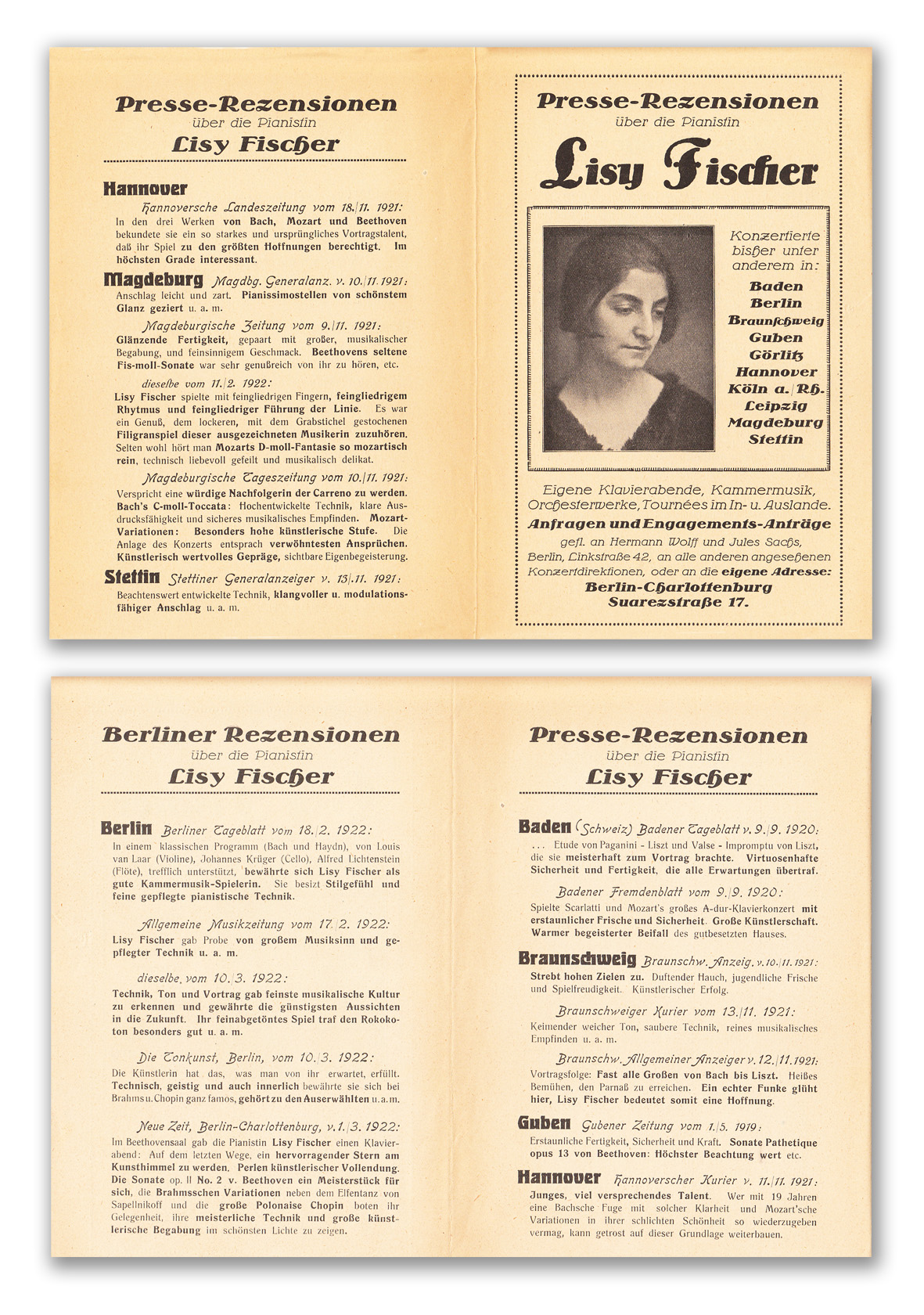
Promotional brochure for Lisy Fischer illustrating some of the venues and press reviews

Between 1920 and 1922 Lisy Fischer gave concerts in Baden, Berlin, Braunschweig, Cologne, Görlitz, Guben, Hannover, Leipzig, Magdeburg, and Stettin (now Szczecin in Poland).

== Family ==
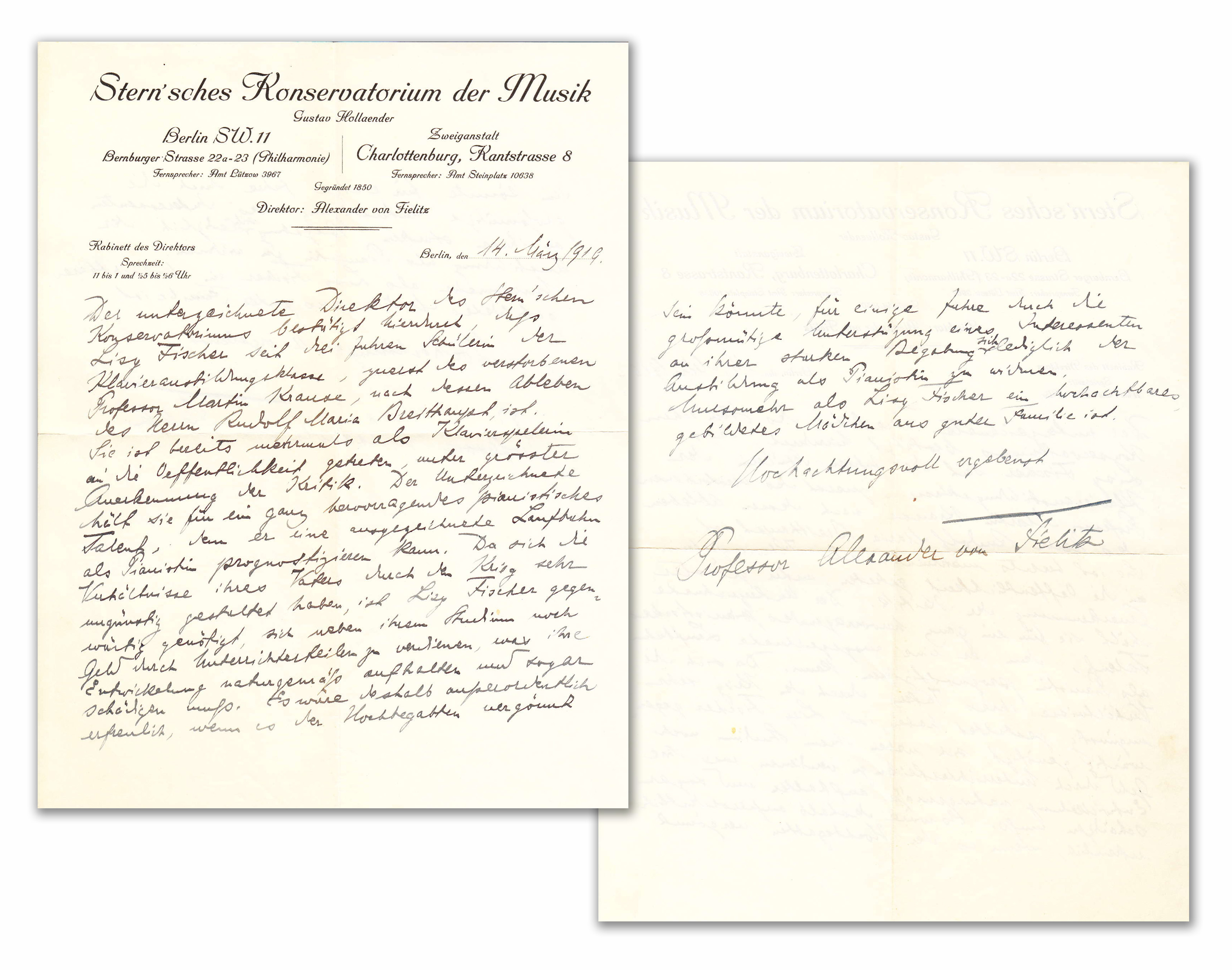
Letter dated March 14, 1919 from Professor Alexander von Fielitz

Lisy Fischer’s development as an artist was adversely affected by World War I. Her parents were supportive but of modest means, her father being a sales agent.

Lisy married Ernest Simson of Düsseldorf and they married in Charlottenburg, Berlin in 1923. The couple had a daughter, Gabrielle, born in 1924 in Amsterdam.

Lisy continued giving concerts, mostly in Switzerland, and was often heard on Swiss Radio and even featured on the front cover of “Radio Journal” the official publication for Radio-Genève published in Zurich, 19 March 1927 - Issue No 12.

Lisy was one of four members of her mother's Hochstetter family to lead distinguished careers in the fields of music and literature.

Her second cousin (also a Hochstetter descendant) was Kurt Weill (born 2 Mar 1900 in Dessau and died 3 April 1950 in Haverstraw, New York), the famous music composer of The Threepenny Opera and Mack the Knife who married Lotte Lenya (born 18 October 1898 in Vienna and died 27 November 1981 in Haverstraw, New York), the famous Austrian singer.

Professor Gustav Hochstetter (born 12 May 1873 in Mannheim and died in 1942 in Theresienstadt concentration camp), Professor of Literature at the University of Brussels, writer and poet and friend of Wilhelm Busch was her first cousin once removed along with his older brother Caesar Hochstetter (born 12 January 1863 in Ladenburg, a suburb of Mannheim - his date and place of death are unknown but this was probably during The Holocaust), a music composer and arranger who collaborated with Max Reger and who dedicated Aquarellen Op. 25 to him.

After the death of her husband Ernest in 1988, she lived in England with her daughter, Gabrielle, until her death. She is buried in the Jewish section of Preston Cemetery, North Shields.
