= Op. 71 =

In music, Op. 71 stands for Opus number 71. Compositions that are assigned this number include:

- Albéniz – Rumores de la Caleta
- Arnold – Symphony No. 4
- Chopin – Polonaises, Op. 71
- Dvořák – Saint Ludmila
- Milhaud – Little Symphony No. 3
- Reger – Gesang der Verklärten
- Schumann – Adventlied for soprano, chorus and orchestra
- Sibelius – Scaramouche, ballet-pantomime for orchestra (1913)
- Tchaikovsky – The Nutcracker
