= Op. 119 =

In music, Op. 119 stands for Opus number 119. Compositions that are assigned this number include:

- Beethoven – Bagatelles, Op. 119
- Brahms – Four Pieces for Piano
- Klebe – Gervaise Macquart
- Prokofiev – Cello Sonata
- Reger – Die Weihe der Nacht
- Saint-Saëns – Cello Concerto No. 2
- Schumann – 3 Gedichte
