= Gesang der Verklärten =

Composition by Max Reger

- Choral composition by Max Reger
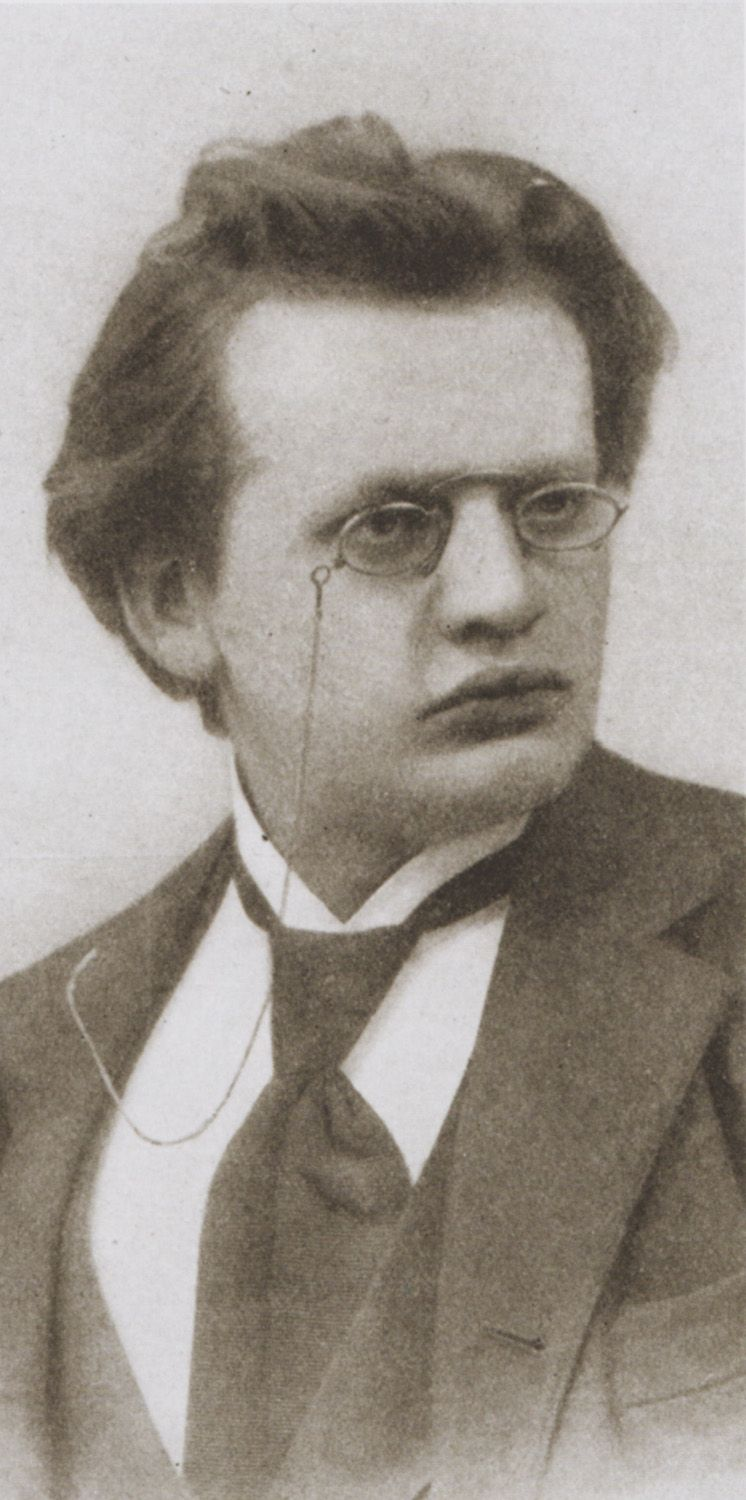
- The composer in 1895
- English: Chant of the Transfigured
- Opus: 71
- Language: German
- Composed: 1903
- Dedication: "Meiner geliebten Frau Elsa"
- Performed: 18 January 1906: Aachen
- Published: 1905: Leipzig by C. F. W. Siegel
- Scoring: chorus; orchestra

Gesang der Verklärten (Chant of the Transfigured), Op. 71, is a composition by Max Reger for a mixed five-part choir and orchestra, a late Romantic setting of a poem by Carl Busse. Reger composed the work in 1903. He dedicated it to "Meiner geliebten Frau Elsa" (My beloved wife Elsa). It was published in 1905 and first performed in Aachen on 18 January 1906 by the municipal choir and orchestra, conducted by Eberhard Schwickerath.

== History ==
Reger composed Gesang der Verklärten in Munich and Berchtesgaden in 1903. He had no interest in setting great literature to music because he thought it was complete without adding music. He rather turned to contemporary writers, such as Jugendstil poets. In a letter to Ella Kerndl he wrote on 1 October 1900 that he was interested in lyrics that "unveils infinitively many glimpses into practically 'uncharted' mental states and conflicts" (unendlich viel Ausblicke in bisher fast „unentdeckte“ seelische Zustände und Conflicte eröffnet). He found the poem by Carl Busse in an anthology of his new poems, published in 1896, revised in 1901). It was the first work by Busse that he set to music, to be followed by three songs. Reger sent the poem to Theodor Kroyer on 3 May 1902: “Enclosed you will find the text for the choral work (in five voices with full orchestra). It’s very beautiful and excellent in mood, don't you think? Something new for a change? How do you like it? – NB: That it’s occasionally a bit 'unrhythmic' does no harm, it gives me an opportunity to 'work out' the subtlest asymmetricalities.” On 22 March 1903 he added: “By the time you receive this letter I'll already be at work on the enclosed text, Gesang der Verklärten, which has been haunting my brain for a long, long time! But I have a murderous dread of failing to give it the musical clothing I have in mind as an ideal." He completed the composition on 10 July 1903, working on markings for dynamics and expression on vacation in Berchtesgaden until 20 August that year.

Reger dedicated it to "Meiner geliebten Frau Elsa" (My beloved wife Elsa). He sent the score to the publisher Lauterbach & Kuhn on 18 September, but requested it back on 29 September. He offered it to the publisher C. F. W. Siegel, where it was finally accepted but, due to problems with the performance rights and the composer not finding time for proof-reading, was published only in July 1905. Reger never used the publisher again.

The work was first performed in Aachen on 18 January 1906 by the municipal choir and orchestra (Städtischer Gesangverein and Städtisches Orchester), conducted by Eberhard Schwickerath. A. von der Schleinitz reported in the Neue Zeitschrift für Musik:

It is not enough to call Reger’s Opus 71, the ink still wet on its pages, the strangest and weirdest thing that has ever resounded in notes. With its dauntless accumulation of huge masses of sound, its unbridled and randomly modulating counterpoint, its strange harmonies leaping over every commonly accepted connecting link and progression, its audacious agglomeration of ugly sounds rarely interrupted by melodic flow, and its difficulties for every participant, far exceeding anything known to date, it may well reach the outermost limit of musical expression altogether, just as it sometimes seems to be an absurd game played with musical forms by a master whose command of his craft borders on genius.

== Bibliography ==
Scores

- Gesang der Verklärten, Op.71 (Reger, Max): Scores at the International Music Score Library Project

Max-Reger-Institut

- "Curriculum vitae". Max-Reger-Institute. Archived from the original on 28 September 2015.
- "Gesang der Verklärten, Op. 71" (in German). Max-Reger-Institute.

Online sources

- Schaarwächter, Jürgen (2011). "Max Reger / Gesang der Verklärten op. 71" (PDF). Musikproduktion Höflich.
