= Georg Dohrn =

German conductor and pianist

- Born: 23 May 1867; Bahrendorf near Magdeburg, Province of Saxony, Kingdom of Prussia
- Died: 9 March 1942 (aged 74); Munich, Nazi Germany
- Education: Domgymnasium Magdeburg; Thomasschule; Leipzig University; Ludwig-Maximilians-Universität München; Humboldt University of Berlin; Heidelberg University; Kölner Konservatorium
- Occupations: Conductor; Pianist

Georg Dohrn (23 May 1867 – 9 March 1942) was a German conductor and pianist, who worked in Munich and Breslau. Inspired by Johannes Brahms to pursue music, he collaborated with notable musicians and composers of his era.

== Life and career ==
Born in Bahrendorf near Magdeburg, Dohrn was the son of a Gutsverwalter (administrator of a large farm). He attended the Domgymnasium Magdeburg and the Thomasschule zu Leipzig. He studied first law at Leipzig University, then at the Ludwig-Maximilians-Universität München and the Humboldt University of Berlin. He was promoted to Dr. jur. in 1891 at the Heidelberg University. During this time, Johannes Brahms inspired him to turn to music professionally. He studied music at the Kölner Konservatorium, with Franz Wüllner, Isidor Weiß and Gustav Jensen. He performed military service at the 1. Westfälisches Feldartillerie-Regiment Nr. 7. In 1895, he became repetiteur at the Weimarer Hoftheater and the Königliches Hoftheater in Munich. From 1897, he was conductor of the Theater Flensburg. He was conductor of the private Kaim-Orchester in Munich from 1898 to 1901. Its chief conductor was Felix von Weingartner, also assisted by Siegmund von Hausegger. Dohrn conducted concerts in Munich and the region, and played the piano in chamber music concerts.

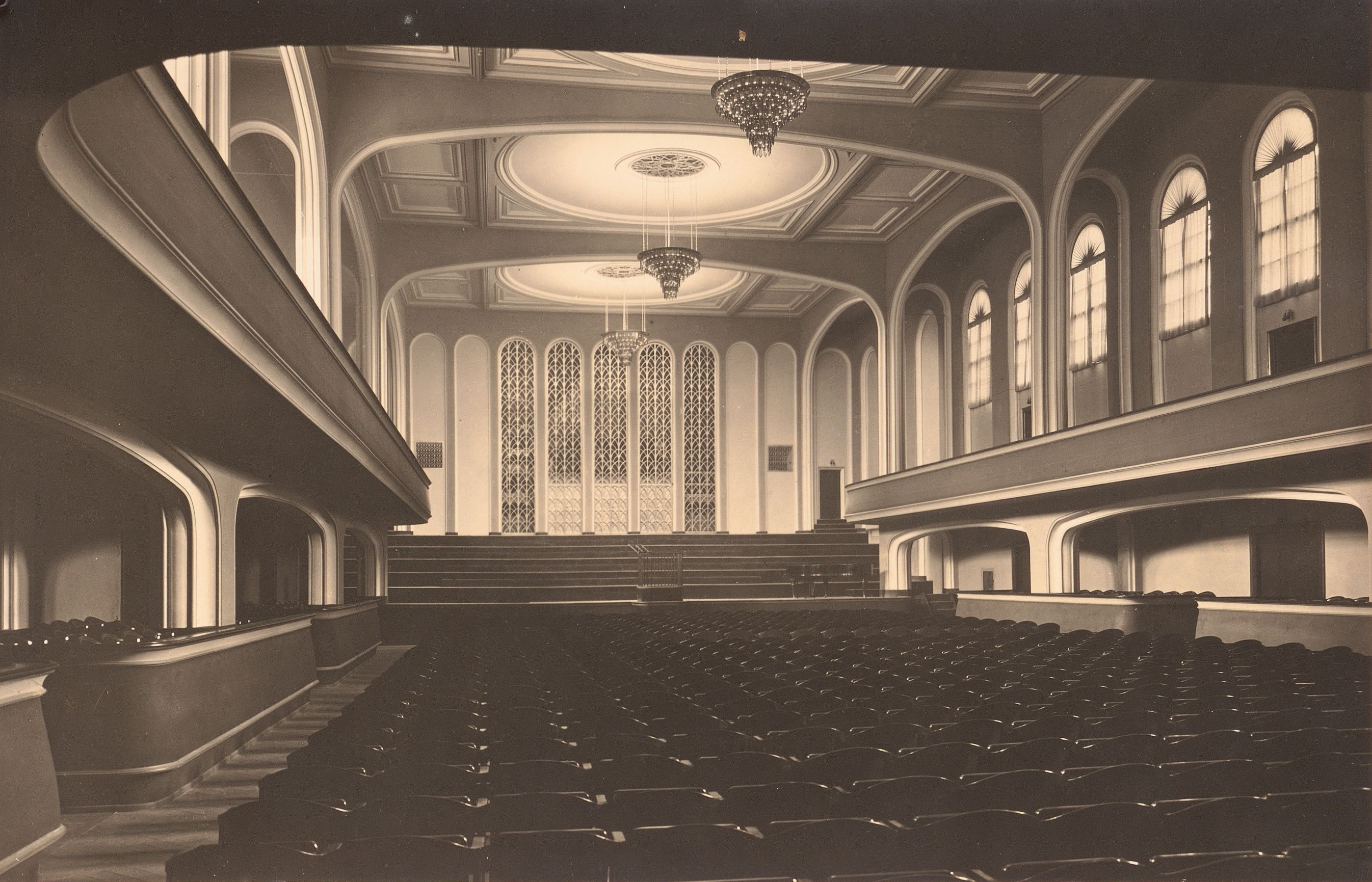
Hall of the Konzerthaus Breslau

From 1901, Dohrn was conductor in Breslau of the Schlesisches Landesorchester, the Breslauer Orchester-Verein and the Sing-Akademie. He received the title professor in 1910. During his time in Breslau, he collaborated with Ferruccio Busoni, Wilhelm Kempff, Siegfried Schultze, Artur Schnabel, Wilhelm Backhaus, Rudolf Serkin, Eduard Erdmann, Adolf Busch, Fritz Kreisler, Bronisław Huberman, Eugen d’Albert, Ilona Durigo and Maria Ivogün, among others, giving guest concerts in Warsaw, Frankfurt, Turin and Leipzig. He arranged festivals devoted to Bach and Reger. Dohrn conducted the premiere of Max Reger's choral symphony Der 100. Psalm, simultaneously with a performance in Chemnitz conducted by the composer, on 23 February 1910. He conducted Mahler's Eighth Symphony in 1913, shortly after its premiere, and Tchaikovsky's First Piano Concerto with Vladimir Horowitz as the soloist in 1926.

Dohrn married in 1904 Hedwig Commichau (1871–1968), a pianist from a wealthy merchant's family. The couple had two children, Klaus Dohrn, who became a banker, and Barbara (1908–1998). Georg Dohrn was a close friend of Brahms, Mahler, Max Reger, Anton Bruckner and Hans Pfitzner. He was an uncle of Wilhelm Furtwängler, whom he supported musically at the beginning of his career.

In 1936, Dohrn retired because of Parkinson's disease and lived at Seeshaupt on Lake Starnberg for the last years. He died in Munich.

== Literature ==
- Klaus Dohrn: Von Bürgern und Weltbürgern. Verlag Günther Neske, Pfullingen 1983, ISBN 3-7885-0255-X.
