= Sofie Rohnstock =

Austrian composer (1875–1964)

Sofie Rohnstock (25 December 1875 – 26 December 1964) was an Austrian composer who is best remembered for her String Trio in G major (for violin, viola and cello), apparently the only one of her compositions to survive World War II.

== Biography ==
Rohnstock was born in Vienna. She studied music at the Leipzig Conservatory (today the University of Music and Theatre Leipzig) with Max Reger and Carl Reinecke. She also made a living as a piano teacher.Unfortunately, her apartment was bombed during World War II, and most of her manuscripts were destroyed, including the piano trio, two symphonies, and quartets for woodwinds and strings.

In 1960, Rohnstock wrote Memories of Max Reger, which was published by the Max-Reger-Institute. She died in Leipzig in 1964.

== String Trio in G major ==
In 1935, she entered a chamber music competition within the Music Department of the Prussian Academy of Arts (now the Academy of Arts, Berlin). The competition received over 200 entries. In addition to the four main prizes, the committee awarded six additional compositions an unplanned prize of 100 Reichsmarks, of which Rohnstock received for her string trio. She was the only women of the 10 named winners.

The string trio is in three movements:

1. Con anima scherzando grazioso
2. Andante
3. Vivace

Silvertrust described it as "a tonal work with some dissonance." It was published in 1979 by Philipp Grosch (now Thomi-Berg). It is still performed today.
