= Caesar Hochstetter =

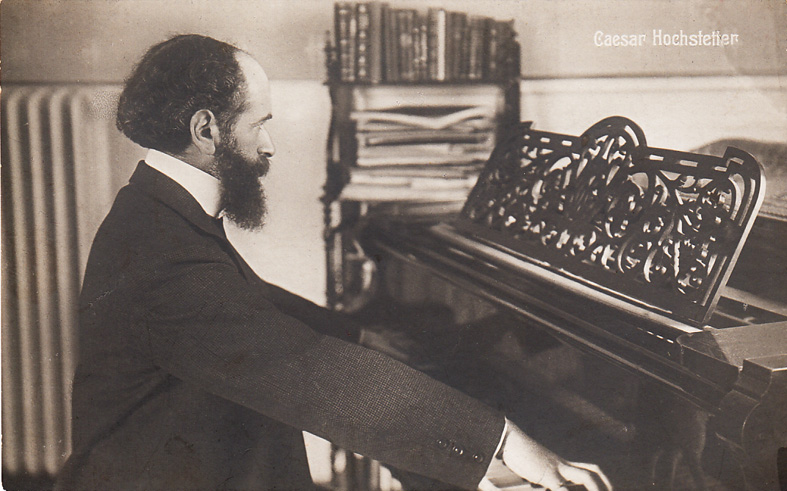

Background information
- Also known as: Caesar Ahrlsteller
- Born: January 12, 1863; Ladenburg, Grand Duchy of Baden
- Died: Unknown
- Occupation(s): Musician, composer, arranger, critic
- Instrument(s): Piano, organ

Caesar Hochstetter (also known by the pen name Caesar Ahrlsteller) was an organist and a composer, arranger and critic of music from a talented Jewish family. Born 12 January 1863 in Ladenburg, a suburb of Mannheim, Germany – his date and place of death are unknown but he is thought to have disappeared during The Holocaust. Caesar Hochstetter was a friend and admirer of the well known composer Max Reger who dedicated Aquarellen Op. 25 and Five pittoresque Pieces for 4-hand Piano, Op. 34 to him.

== Private life ==
On 13 February 1888, Caesar married Blanche Marie Coppex who a short time later gave birth to their daughter, Blanche. Caesar lived and worked in Germany and Switzerland. He moved to Leipzig in 1889, was in Wiesbaden in 1901 and later returned to Zurich, Switzerland. He was last heard of in August 1928 when he left for Darmstadt. His marriage to Blanche ended in divorce after 10 years and in 1904 he married Emma Marie Ficinus in Zurich. Their daughter, Hella Leonora was born in Zurich in 1905. Their son, Fritz Caesar Werner died a few weeks after birth in 1907.

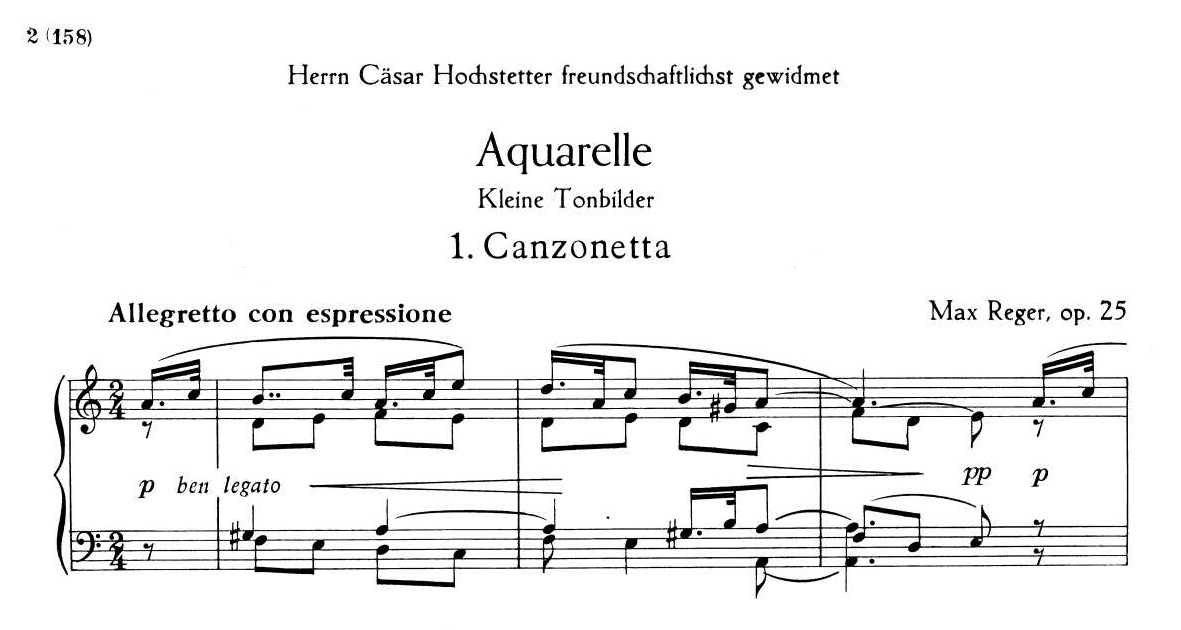
Aquarellen Op.25 by Max Reger dedicated to Caesar Hochstetter

== Max Reger ==
In 1898 Hochstetter published an article entitled “Noch einmal Max Reger" in a music magazine (Die Redenden Künste 5 nr. 49, s. 943 f). Caesar recommends Reger as “a highly talented young composer" to the publishers. Reger then thanks Hochstetter with the dedications of his Op. 25 and 34.

== Compositions and arrangements ==
Caesar Hochstetter published his arrangement “Album fuer einhändige Klavierspiel: 8 Stuecke von Bach, Chopin, Schumann, Reger und Zichy”, for right or left hand (Breitkopf & Haertel, 1915). His known works also include “Zwei Clavierstücke” Op. 2 (R. Forberg, Leipzig), arrangements for Bach's “Sarabande und Bourrée” for piano (A. Holzmann, Zurich) and “10 kleine Stücke Op. 24” (A. Holzmann, Zurich).

== One-hand compositions ==
Hochstetter published an article in "Musikalisches Wochenblatt" in Leipzig on 24 January 1901 giving a positive critique of a concert given in Budapest by Count Géza Zichy of Hungary, who suffered a riding accident in his teens and lost his right arm. Determined to become a pianist, he studied under Franz Liszt and Robert Volkmann and in spite of his physical limitations enjoyed a successful career as a composer and pianist spanning some 40 years.

Hochstetter also corresponded with Josef Rheinberger, a notable composer, organist and pianist from Vaduz, Liechtenstein who composed "Piano studies for one hand and for two hands, Op. 113".

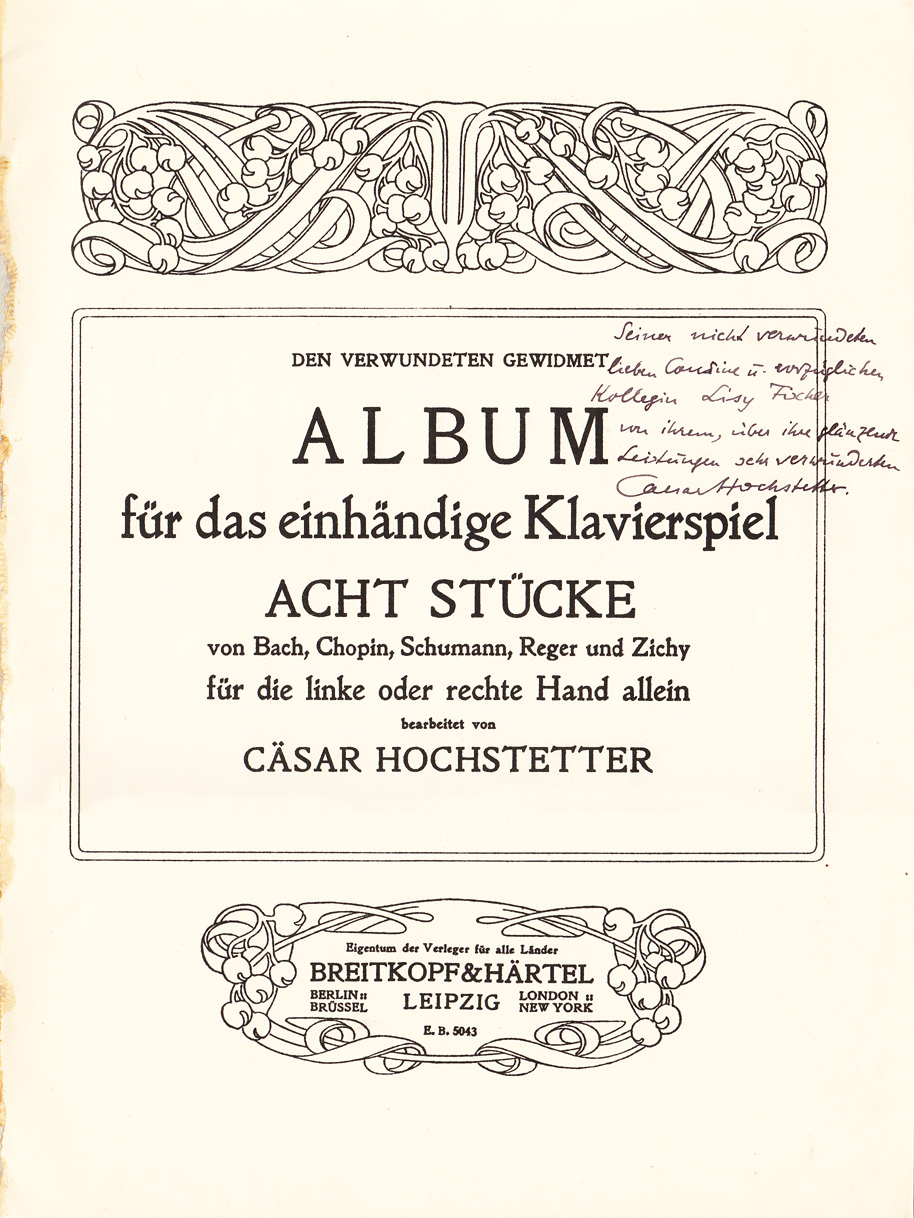
Hochstetter's one-handed piano pieces inscribed to his cousin, Lisy Fischer

== Family ==
Caesar was one of four members of the same Hochstetter family to lead distinguished careers in the fields of music and literature.

His first cousin once removed (also a Hochstetter descendant) was Kurt Weill (born 2 March 1900 in Dessau and died 3 April 1950 in Haverstraw, New York), the famous music composer of "The Threepenny Opera" and "Mack the Knife" who married Lotte Lenya (born 18 October 1898 in Vienna and died 27 November 1981 in Haverstraw, New York), the famous Austrian singer and actress.

Caesar's younger brother was Professor Gustav Hochstetter (born 12 May 1873 in Mannheim and died in 1942 in Theresienstadt concentration camp), Professor of Literature at the University of Brussels, writer and poet and friend of Wilhelm Busch.

Another first cousin once removed was the childhood prodigy pianist, Lisy Fischer (born 22 Aug 1900 in Zurich, Switzerland and died 6 June 1999 in Newcastle upon Tyne, England), with whom Caesar was in regular contact (she also lived in Switzerland), whose career he followed and to whom he gave support and encouragement.
