= Johnny Hodges and His Strings Play the Prettiest Gershwin =

Studio album by Johnny Hodges
- Released: June 1962
- Recorded: November 18, 1958; Stuttgart, West Germany
- Genre: Jazz
- Length: 34:54
- Label: Verve MGV 8314

Johnny Hodges chronology
Not So Dukish (1958)	Johnny Hodges and His Strings Play the Prettiest Gershwin (1962)	Back to Back: Duke Ellington and Johnny Hodges Play the Blues (1959)

Johnny Hodges and His Strings Play the Prettiest Gershwin is an album by saxophonist Johnny Hodges accompanied by an orchestra performing Gershwin tunes recorded in Stuttgart in 1958 for the Verve label.

== Reception ==
Professional ratings
Review scores
Source	Rating
AllMusic	3.5/5 stars

The AllMusic reviewer commented: "All of these performances, like most of the music in the latter day Johnny Hodges discography, combine the elegant tonal ligatures of swing and cool".

== Track listing ==
All compositions by George and Ira Gershwin, except as indicated.

1. "Love Is Here to Stay" - 2:44
2. "Nice Work If You Can Get It" - 3:13
3. "'S Wonderful" - 2:51
4. "Summertime" (George Gershwin, Ira Gershwin, DuBose Heyward) - 2:59
5. "Soon" - 2:58
6. "But Not for Me" - 2:43
7. "Somebody Loves Me" (George Gershwin, Ballard MacDonald, Buddy DeSylva) - 2:31
8. "They Can't Take That Away from Me" - 3:16
9. "Someone to Watch over Me" - 3:14
10. "The Man I Love" - 2:57
11. "Oh, Lady Be Good!" - 2:38
12. "They All Laughed" - 2:50

== Personnel ==
- Johnny Hodges - alto saxophone
- Horst Jankowski - piano
- Unidentified string section arranged by Russ Garcia and conducted by Wolfram Röhrig
