= Wiesbadener Tagblatt =

German newspaper in Hesse (1852–2020)

- Type: Daily newspaper
- Format: Broadsheet
- Owner: Verlagsgruppe Rhein Main
- Publisher: Verlagsgruppe Rhein Main
- Editor-in-chief: Stefan Schröder
- Founded: 1852
- Ceased publication: January 2, 2020
- Language: German
- Circulation: 11.000
- Website: www.wiesbadener-tagblatt.de

The Wiesbadener Tagblatt (WT) was a regional daily newspaper for the area in and around the state capital of Hesse, Wiesbaden, in Germany.

The newspaper was established in the 1840s by August Schellenberg under the name Wiesbadener Wochenblatt. It was renamed Wiesbadener Tagblatt in 1852. It was part of Rhein-Main-Presse and was published by Verlagsgruppe Rhein Main, together with the Wiesbadener Kurier. In 2013, the editorial office was merged with Wiesbadener Kurier and relocated to Mainz. The newspaper ceased publication in January 2020.
