= Lioba Braun =

German opera singer

- Born: 4 September 1957 (age 67); Hanau, Hesse, Germany
- Occupation: Operatic mezzo-soprano
- Organizations: Nationaltheater Mannheim
- Awards: Bundeswettbewerb Gesang
- Website: www.lioba-braun.de

Lioba Braun (born 4 September 1957) is a German opera singer and academic teacher at the Hochschule für Musik und Tanz Köln and the Hochschule für Musik und Theater München. Based at the Nationaltheater Mannheim, she has appeared mostly in mezzo-soprano parts at major opera houses and festivals. She became internationally known appearing as Brangäne at the Bayreuth Festival in 1994, and performed the soprano part of Isolde on stage first in 2012.

== Career ==
Born in Hanau, Hesse, Germany, on 4 September 1957, Braun grew up in Würzburg, where she studied church music and worked as a church musician at the Würzburg Cathedral. Her voice was discovered when she was age 27, by voice teacher Lotte Lehmann who then trained her.

She worked at theatres such as Badisches Staatstheater Karlsruhe, Volksoper in Vienna and Vienna State Opera. From 1993 to 2000, she was a member of the Nationaltheater Mannheim where she performed several mezzo-soprano parts, including roles by Wagner and Verdi, such as Eboli in Verdi's Don Carlos, Azucena in his Il trovatore, Amneris in his Aida, Kundry in Wagner's Parsifal and Venus in his Tannhäuser.

She was noticed internationally when she appeared at the 1994 Bayreuth Festival as Brangäne in Tristan und Isolde, conducted by Daniel Barenboim. She performed there also Waltraute, Siegrune and the second Norne in Der Ring des Nibelungen. She also sang at La Scala, Teatro Real Madrid, Liceu in Barcelona, in Berlin, Dresden, Leipzig, Munich, Stuttgart, Zurich, Rome and Los Angeles.

Her operatic characters have included Donna Elvira in Mozart's Don Giovanni, Ortrud in Wagner's Lohengrin, Fricka in his Der Ring des Nibelungen, the Composer in Ariadne auf Naxos by Richard Strauss, the Nurse in his Die Frau ohne Schatten, and Judith in Bartok's Bluebeard's Castle.

In soprano range, she appeared as Isolde, conducted by Andris Nelsons, in Birmingham and Paris. She performed the part first on stage at the Nürnberg Opera in 2012, conducted by Marcus Bosch. She appeared as the Marschallin in Der Rosenkavalier by Strauss.

In concert, she has performed solo parts in Mahler's symphonies and in works by Beethoven, Brahms and Berg, at the Vienna Musikvereinssaal, the Festspielhaus Baden-Baden, at the Salzburg Festival, Berliner Philharmonie, the Dresdner Musikfestspiele and for the pope in Rome. She has collaborated with conductors Claudio Abbado, Riccardo Chailly, Myung-whun Chung, Christoph Eschenbach, Lorin Maazel, Zubin Mehta, Riccardo Muti, Kent Nagano, Simon Rattle, and Giuseppe Sinopoli.

Braun has been a professor of voice at the Hochschule für Musik und Tanz Köln and the Hochschule für Musik und Theater München from 2010.

== Recordings ==
Braun was in 1995 the first soloist to record Reger's Die Weihe der Nacht, with the Bamberg Symphony and Choir conducted by Horst Stein. Her recordings have further included Lioba Braun singt Wagner, conducted by Peter Schneider in 2005, Mozart's Requiem, conducted by Christian Thielemann in 2006, the Alto Rhapsody by Johannes Brahms, conducted by Helmuth Rilling also in 2006, and Mahlers Second and Eighth Symphonie conducted by Jonathan Nott in 2009 respectively 2011.

== Awards ==
Braun achieved a prize in the German national competition Bundeswettbewerb Gesang in 1986.
