= Walter Rein =

German composer, academic, and musicologist

Walter Rein (10 December 1893, Stotternheim, now district of Erfurt - 18 June 1955, Berlin) was a German composer, academic, and musicologist.
