= Alysia Roehrig =

American psychologist

Alysia D. Roehrig is an American psychologist who is a professor and chair of the educational psychology and learning systems department at the Florida State University College of Education. She was elected a fellow of the American Psychological Association in 2023. Roehrig earned a M.A. and Ph.D. in developmental psychology from the University of Notre Dame.
