= Wolfram Röhrig =

- Born: 5 October 1916; Halle (Saale), Province of Saxony, Kingdom of Prussia in the German Empire
- Died: 30 May 1998 (aged 81); Esslingen am Neckar, Baden-Württemberg, Germany
- Other names: Wolf Droysen
- Occupations: Jazz pianist; Conductor; Composer
- Organizations: Hessischer Rundfunk; Süddeutscher Rundfunk; Deutsche Jazz Föderation; Nürnberg Lehrergesangverein
- Awards: Medaille für Verdienste um die deutsche Musik; Georg-Friedrich-Händel-Ring

Wolfram Röhrig (5 October 1916 – 30 May 1998) was a German pianist, composer and conductor, who also worked under the alias Wolf Droysen. A jazz pianist, he was the director of music departments of the broadcasters Hessischer Rundfunk and Süddeutscher Rundfunk, responsible for light music and jazz. With the choir Nürnberg Lehrergesangverein from Nuremberg, Germany, he performed and recorded works such as Te Deum compositions by Anton Bruckner and Heinrich Sutermeister, and Max Reger's Der 100. Psalm.

== Career ==
Born in Halle (Saale), from 1935 Röhrig studied piano, conducting and composition in Berlin. After World War II he worked as a jazz pianist and arranger. In 1953, he became director of the music department of the broadcaster Hessischer Rundfunk. He moved in 1955 to the Süddeutscher Rundfunk, where he directed Unterhaltungsmusik, initiated the "Tage der Leichten Musik" (Days of light music) and was responsible for "Treffpunkt Jazz" (Meeting point jazz). He was from 1967 to 1996 president of the Deutsche Jazz Föderation, and from 1969 also the vice president of its European organisation.

As a conductor, he recorded with Jimmy Giuffre (Piece for Clarinet and Strings) and Johnny Hodges, including the albums Piece for Clarinet and String Orchestra/Mobiles and Johnny Hodges and His Strings Play the Prettiest Gershwin. He composed film scores for Rommel Calls Cairo (1959), Foxhole in Cairo (1960) and Immer wenn es Nacht wird (1961). He also wrote the music for the films of Die Hesselbachs.

He was particularly interested in choral music, conducting performances and recordings with the Nürnberg Lehrergesangverein at the Meistersingerhalle in Nuremberg, with the Nürnberger Symphoniker. In 1972 he conducted Bruckner's Third Symphony and Te Deum. In 1978, he recorded the Te Deum by Heinrich Sutermeister with soprano soloist Maria de Francesca-Cavazza. Also in the 1970s, he recorded Max Reger's Der 100. Psalm.

In 1982 he was awarded the Medaille für Verdienste um die deutsche Musik (Medal of merits for German music) from the Deutscher Komponistenverband. He received in 1983 the quadrennial Georg-Friedrich-Händel-Ring award from the Verband Deutscher Konzertchöre. He died in Esslingen am Neckar.

== Literature ==
- Jürgen Wölfer: Jazz in Deutschland – Das Lexikon. Alle Musiker und Plattenfirmen von 1920 bis heute. Hannibal Verlag, Höfen 2008, ISBN 978-3-85445-274-4.
