= Wiesbadener Kurier =

German newspaper in Hesse

- Type: Daily newspaper
- Format: Broadsheet
- Owner(s): Verlagsgruppe Rhein Main
- Publisher: Wiesbadener Kurier GmbH & Co. Verlag und Druckerei KG
- Editor-in-chief: Stefan Schröder
- Founded: 2 October 1945
- Language: German
- Headquarters: Wiesbadener Kurier, Langgasse 21, D-65183 Wiesbaden
- Circulation: 59,152
- Website: www.wiesbadener-kurier.de

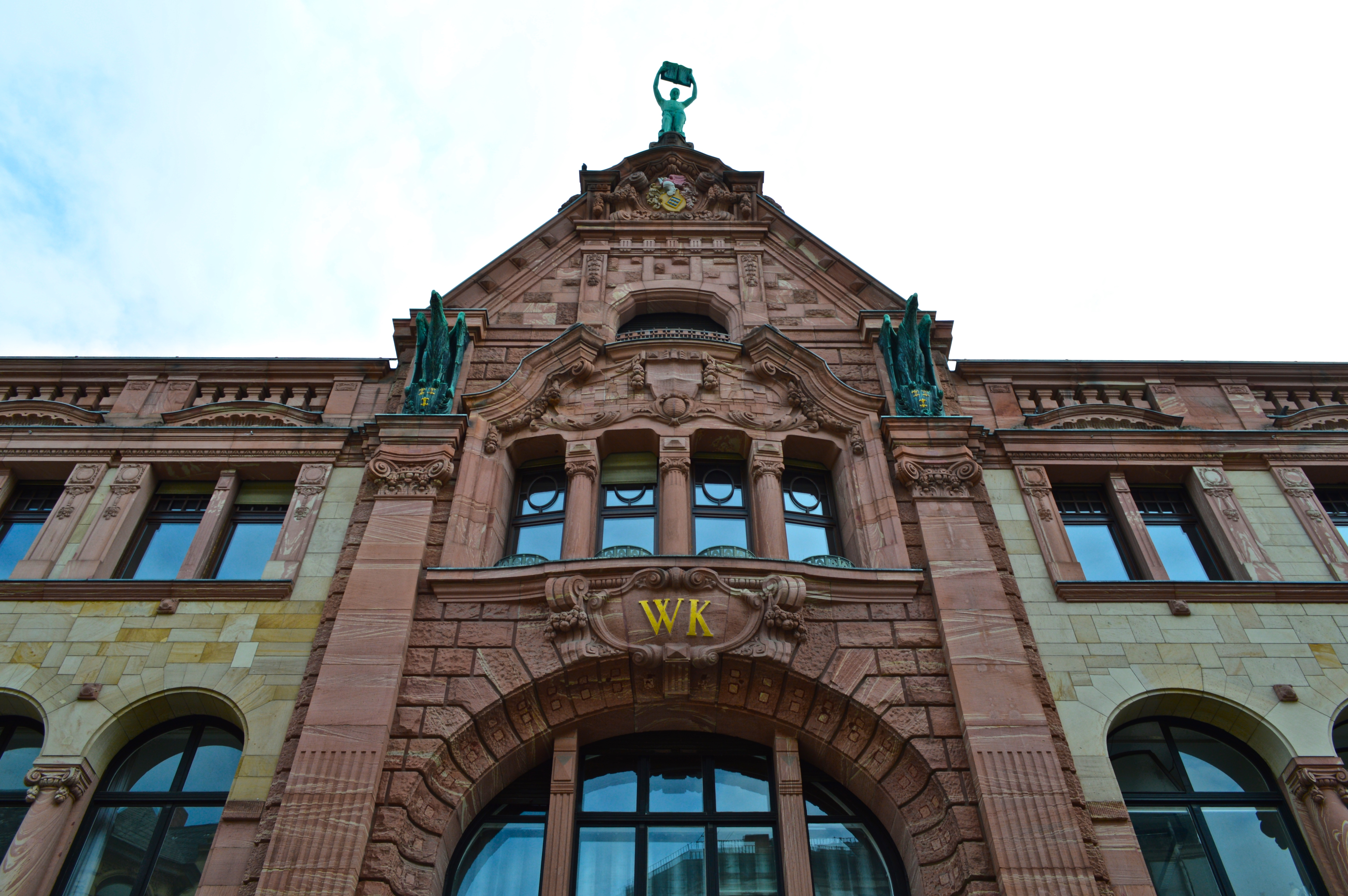
Exterior of the Wiesbadener Kurier building, as seen from Langgasse

The Wiesbadener Kurier (also known as the WK) is a regional, daily newspaper published by the Wiesbadener Kurier GmbH & Co. Verlag und Druckerei KG for the area in and around the state capital of Hesse, Wiesbaden in Germany.

The newspaper was created in 1945.
