= Elsa Reger =

German writer (1870–1951)

- Born: Margarete Ulrike Augusta Marie Karoline Elsa von Bagenski; 25 October 1870; Kolberg, Germany
- Died: 3 May 1951 (aged 80); Bonn, Germany
- Other name: Elsa von Bercken
- Occupation: Writer
- Organizations: Max-Reger-Institute
- Spouses: Franz von Bercken (m. 1887; div. 1899) Max Reger (m. 1904; died 1916)

Margarete Ulrike Augusta Marie Karoline Elsa Reger (née von Bagenski; previously von Bercken, 25 October 1870 – 3 May 1951) was a German writer, the wife of the pianist and composer Max Reger, whose memory she kept alive by founding an archive, the Max-Reger-Institute, and a foundation, all dedicated to him and his work.

== Life ==
Margarete Ulrike Augusta Marie Karoline Elsa von Bagenski was born in Kolberg on 25 October 1870, the daughter of Captain Ernst Hugo Robert von Bagenski (or von Bagensteg or von Bagensky) and his wife Auguste (or Augusta) Karoline Josepha Marie Theresia Fanny Olga (née Baroness von Seckendorff-Aberdar zur Welt). Her grandmother was a well-known singer, and her mother was interested in music in the house. Her parents were divorced early, and she lived with her mother on the estate of her mother's brother Ernst von Senckendorff near Crailsheim, growing up with Berthel, the daughter of Ernst and his wife. After the death of her parents in 1878, Berthel became Elsa's foster sister, and her mother moved with the girls to Wiesbaden. Elsa received singing lessons for several years, but no vocational training, as customary for upper-class girls at the time.

She married Franz von Bercken, an officer, in 1887; they moved to the Polish province, but she frequently spent several weeks with her mother . She met Max Reger in 1893 on a summer vacation in Wiesbaden, where he was her sister's piano teacher. She was impressed by his musicality but may have noticed that he suffered from depressions and alcoholism, and first rejected Reger's courting. She moved back permanently to her mother in 1898 and divorced her husband in 1899. She moved with her mother and sister to Schneewinkel near Berchtesgaden that year. Reger was a guest there until she rejected his continued courting. Reger composed many art songs between 1899 and 1902. They met again in 1902 at one of his concerts; when they listened to Wagner's Parsifal together, she changed her mind, as she recorded in her memoir.

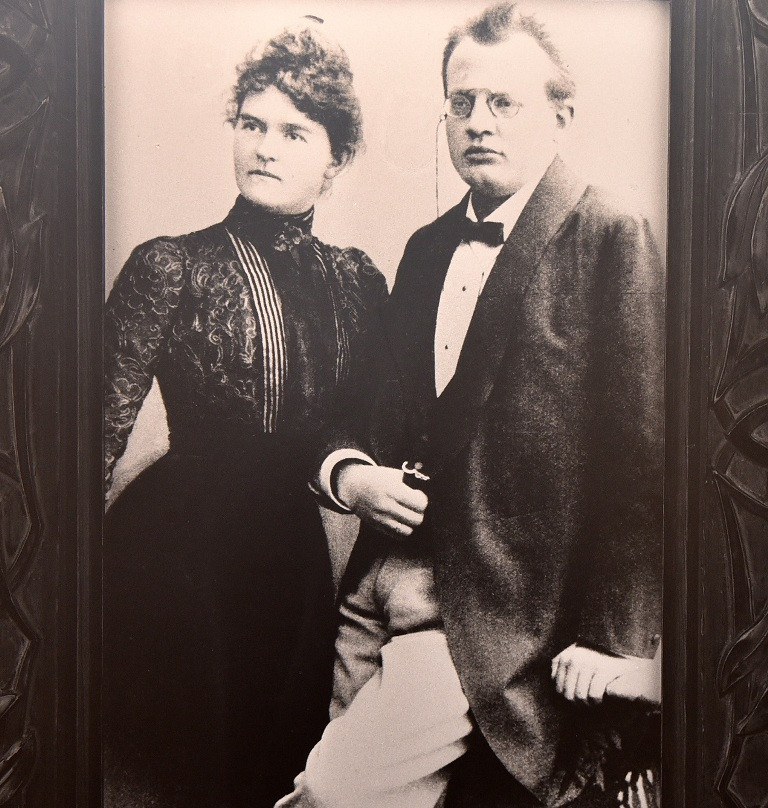
Elsa and Max Reger, c. 1900

The Regers married on 7 December 1902 in Bad Boll and lived in Munich. As she was divorced and a Protestant, the Catholic Reger was excommunicated. Elsa's mother Auguste also moved to Munich where she died in 1904. Elsa followed the composer, whose fame increased, to Leipzig in 1907, to Meiningen in 1911, and to Jena in 1915. She accompanied him to rehearsals and performances, and took care of his students as the Regermutter (Reger mother). The couple adopted two daughters, Marie-Martha Heyer (1905–1969), adopted in 1908 as Christa Reger, and Selma Charlotte Meinig (1907–1963), adopted as Lotti Reger in 1909. The relationship was troubled by Reger's continued depressions and alcoholism, and her sickly constitution and her tendency toward depressive moods.

After her husband's death in Jena in 1916, she took care of their daughters and also kept his memory alive. Her first step were house concerts in their residence, beginning in 1917. She invited her husband's former friends and students, who were familiar with his wishes for interpretation, to perform his works on two consecutive days in summer, also in 1918 and 1920. The performers played for free, and she took care of all expenses. She initiated a Max Reger Archive in 1920. She had left his studio unchanged after his death, and added a former dining room to contain his works. She retained 35 autographs for herself that had been in her husband's possession when he died, which later helped her as a financial protection in times of need, such as the economic crisis of the 1920s and World War II. The archive was moved to Schloss Weimar in 1922, supported by the State of Thuringia. It was moved to Meiningen in 1948. In 1927 she commissioned Else von Hase-Koehler, an author of novels, to collect the correspondence of her husband for publication. Around 4000 letters were collected, and 745 of them published, some of them shortened.

In 1930 she moved to Munich, where her husband's urn was interred on an honorary grave of the Waldfriedhof. She wrote, together with Hase-Koehler, an autobiography, Mein Leben mit und für Max Reger (My life with and for Reger), published in 1930. She created a memorial place in her home of photographies and portrait paintings of her husband. She again ran house concerts and prepared the publication of his works. She tried in vain until 1940 to move the Reger archive to Munich.

Bombing of Munich led to her move to relatives in Bonn. She founded there in 1947 both the Elsa Reger Foundation and the Max-Reger-Institute. She had no financial means at the time but convinced the Cologne Regierungspräsidium that she would receive money for concerts with Max Reger's music during the war, not realising that few such concerts happened and no money would be paid.

She died in Bonn in 1951, at the age of 80. According to her wish, she was buried on the Alter Friedhof close to Clara Schumann and Maria Magdalena van Beethoven, Beethoven's mother. Her ideas and visions for the Foundation came reality only after her death.
