= Max-Reger-Institute =

German research institute

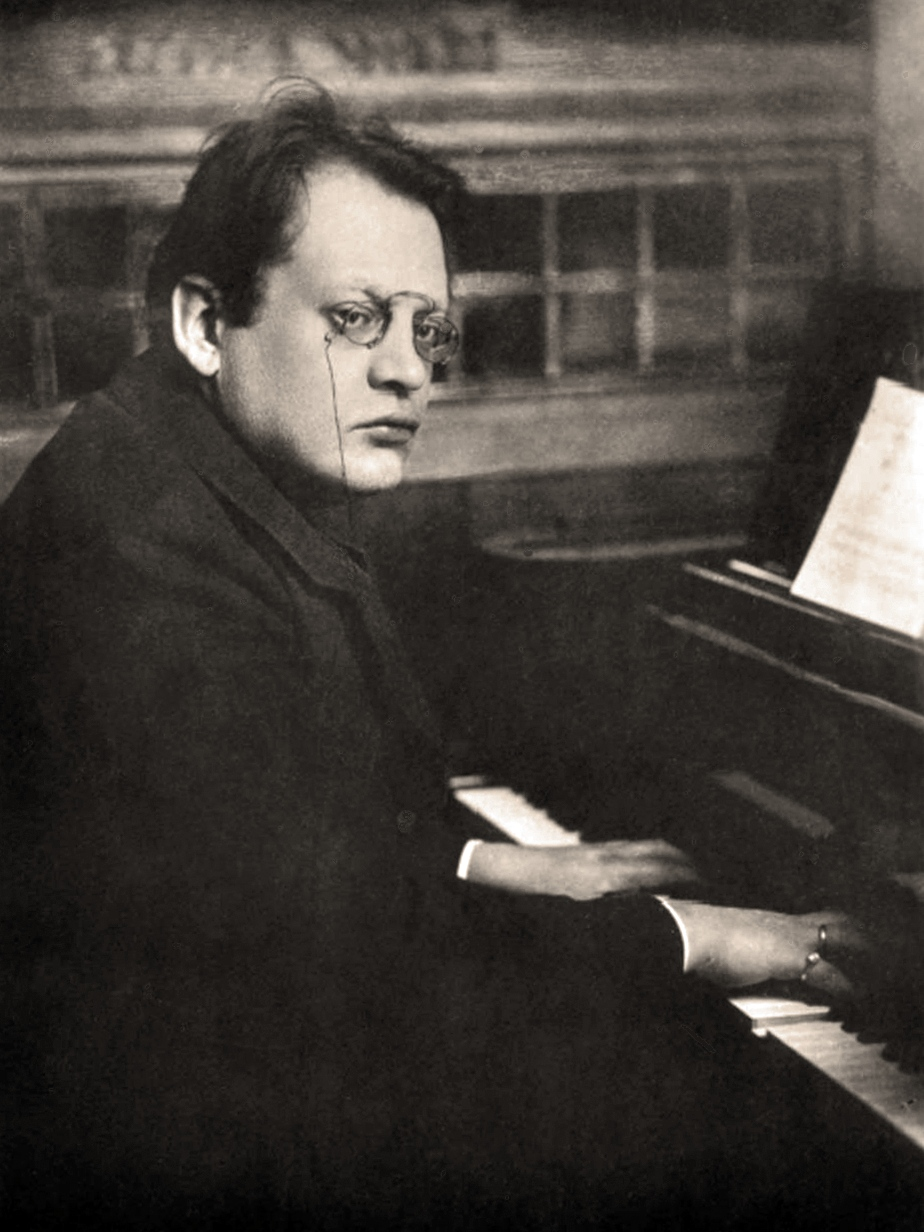
- Max Reger at the piano, c. 1910
- Founder: Elsa Reger
- Established: 1947
- Focus: Max Reger and his works
- Owner: Elsa-Reger-Stiftung
- Location: Karlsruhe, Baden-Württemberg, Germany
- Coordinates: 48.9988°N 8.4747°E
- Interactive map of Max-Reger-Institute
- Website: www.max-reger-institut.de/en/

The Max-Reger-Institute (MRI) is a musicological research institute and archive in Karlsruhe, Germany, dedicated to the work of the composer Max Reger, a representative of German music around the turn of the 20th century. An associated foundation, the Elsa-Reger-Stiftung, is named after his wife, Elsa Reger, who founded the foundation and the institute. It has a substantial archive of manuscripts and documents related to Reger.

== History ==
Reger's widow and biographer, Elsa Reger, installed in 1947 a foundation, run by the Max-Reger-Institut in Bonn. A main objective was to collect the autographs which had been dispersed during two world wars, and to establish an archive as a base for research. The institute moved to Karlsruhe in 1996, first to the building of the Museum für Literatur am Oberrhein. The state Baden-Württemberg and the town Karlsruhe have funded the institute since. In 1998, it moved to the Karlsburg in Durlach. It collaborates with the Musikhochschule and with the Baden State Library.

== Archive ==
The archive holds autographs of sketches, scores and corrections from all periods and genres of Reger's compositions, also many of his handwritten letters and postcards to friends, publishers, performers and notable contemporaries. It also keeps the correspondence of his widow, and documents, photos, paintings, caricatures, concert programs and other memorabilia. From 2003, the BrüderBuschArchiv, an archive of the brothers Fritz Busch and Adolf Busch with many documents related to their work is part of the MRI. The library holds prints of first editions as well as later ones, international literature about Reger and related topics, sound documents, and copies of manuscripts that are not part of the MRI's archive.

== Publications ==
The MRI is the centre of research of the composer, publishing research in its own Schriftenreihe (monographic series), including dissertations written with scientific guidance by the MRI. A new edition of Reger's works, the Reger-Werk-Ausgabe, was begun in 2008. The new Reger-Werk-Verzeichnis appeared in 2011, funded in part by the Deutsche Forschungsgemeinschaft.

== Other activities ==
A focus of the MRI has been to provide access to the material related to Reger, to researchers, musicians and music lovers. The institute organizes regularly exhibitions, conventions, lecture concerts, and concert series in collaboration with international music schools and universities. In 2005 the MRI established a biennial European chamber music competition, the Europäischer Kammermusikwettbewerb Karlsruhe, together with Karlsruhe and the Hochschule für Musik Karlsruhe.
