= List of compositions by Max Reger =

Compositions by Max Reger
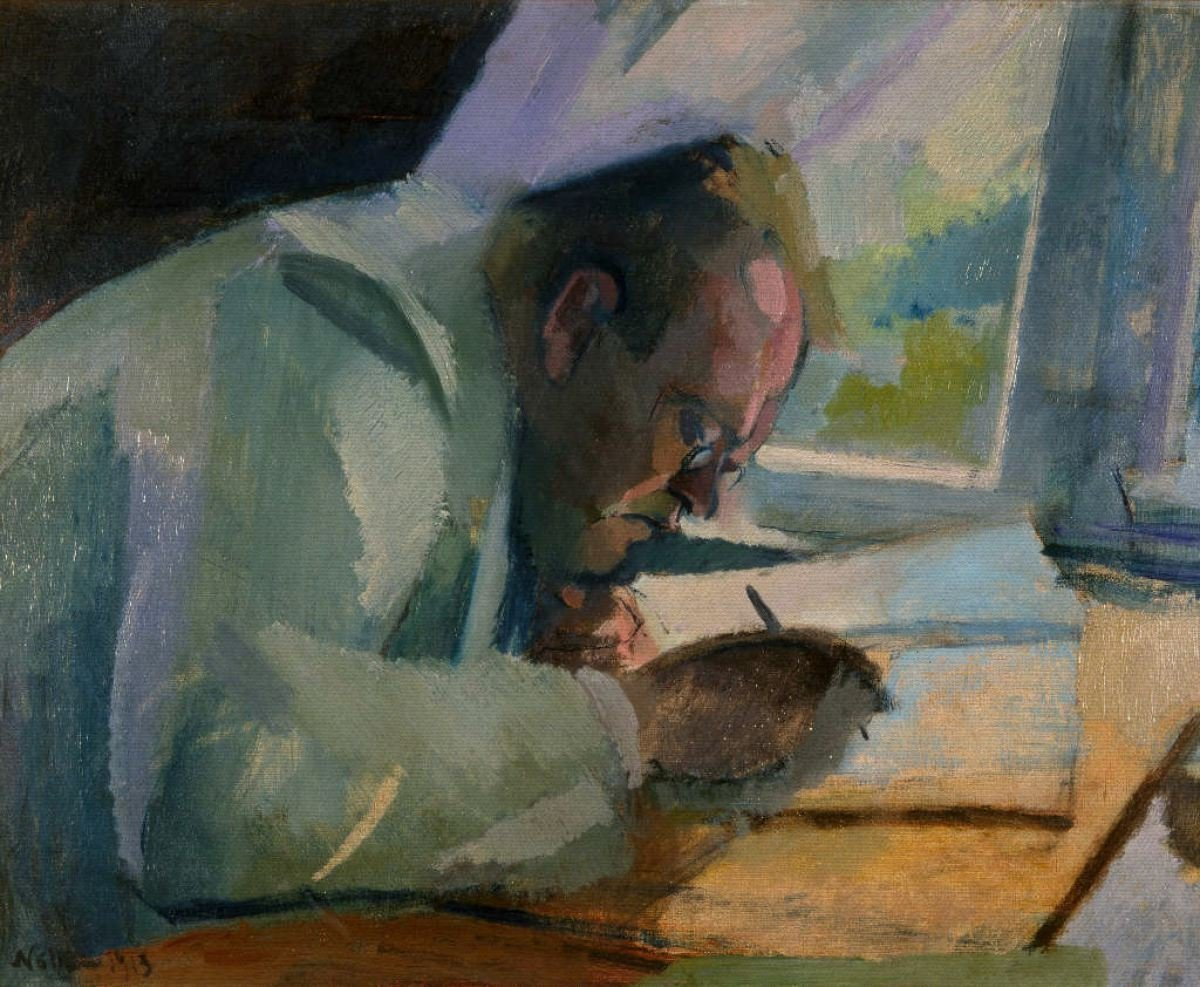
- The composer at work, painting by Franz Nölken, 1913
- 1887–1916
- Lied: choral music; chamber music; concertos; piano music; organ music; orchestral music

Max Reger was a German composer of the late-Romantic period. His works are initially listed by Opus number (Op.), followed by works without Op. number (WoO). Other features shown are translation of titles, key, scoring, year of composition, genre, information about texts and their authors, a link to the Max-Reger-Institute, which provides detailed information about times of composition, performance and publishing, and a link to the free score when available.

== History ==
Reger was a German composer, born in Brand in 1873. He studied music theory in Sondershausen, then piano and theory, in Wiesbaden. The first compositions to which he assigned opus numbers were chamber music and Lieder. A pianist himself, he composed works for both piano and organ.

Reger returned to his parental home in 1898, where he composed his first work for choir and orchestra, Hymne an den Gesang (Hymn to singing), Op. 21. He moved to Munich in 1901. In 1907 he was appointed musical director at the Leipzig University and professor at the Royal Conservatory in Leipzig.

In 1911 Reger was appointed Hofkapellmeister (music director) at the court of Duke Georg II of Saxe-Meiningen, retaining his master class at the Leipzig conservatory. In 1913 he composed four tone poems on paintings by Arnold Böcklin (Vier Tondichtungen nach A. Böcklin), including Die Toteninsel (Isle of the Dead), as his Op. 128. He gave up the court position in 1914 for health reasons. In response to World War I, he thought in 1914 already to compose a choral work to commemorate the fallen of the war. He began to set the Latin Requiem but abandoned the work as a fragment. In 1915 he moved to Jena, still teaching in Leipzig. He composed in Jena the Hebbel Requiem for soloist, choir and orchestra. Reger died in Leipzig on 11 May 1916.

Reger assigned opus numbers to major works himself. In his compositions for solo voices and for choirs, he set poems by notable lyricists, including contemporaries, such as Gabriele D'Annunzio, Otto Julius Bierbaum, Joseph von Eichendorff, Friedrich Hebbel, Detlev von Liliencron and Friedrich Rückert.

== Table of compositions ==
Reger's works with an opus number are listed first, then works designated as WoO (work without opus number). Details about the compositions follow, such as song titles and names of poets for collections of songs. The scoring is given if it cannot be ascertained from the title or the genre: for example songs (Lieder, Gesänge) are normally for voice and piano, in a sonata the named solo instrument is usually accompanied by piano, and choral works are for four-part choir a cappella, unless otherwise noted.

When the opus number provides a link, it leads to more details about a work, such as the titles, markings and keys of its parts. The last column provides two links for reference, when available: one to the detailed information on the piece by the Max-Reger-Institute (in German), which appears as "MR" and the number on the website, the other to a free score (sc).

Compositions by Max Reger
Op.	Title	Translation	Key	Scoring	Year	Genre	Text	Reference / score
1	Violin Sonata (No. 1)		D minor		1890	Chamber		MR 001 sc
2	Piano Trio (No. 1)		B minor	violin; viola; piano	1891	Chamber		MR 002 sc
3	Violin Sonata (No. 2)		D major		1891	Chamber		MR 003 sc
4	Sechs Lieder	Six songs			1891	Lied		MR 004 sc
5	Cello Sonata (No. 1)		F minor		1892	Chamber		MR 005 sc
6	Drei Chöre	Three choral compositions		choir; piano	1892	Choral		MR 006
7	Drei Orgelstücke	Three organ pieces			1892	Organ		MR 007 sc
8	Fünf Lieder	Five songs			1892	Lied		MR 008 sc
9	Walzercapricen	Twelve Waltz-Caprices		4-hand piano	1892	Piano		MR 009 sc
10	Deutsche Tänze	20 German Dances		4-hand piano	1892	Piano		MR 010 sc
11	Sieben Walzer	Seven waltzes			1893	Piano		MR 011 sc
12	Fünf Lieder	Five songs (in the style of Franz Schubert)			1893	Lied		MR 012 sc
13	Lose Blätter Kleine Stücke				1894	Piano		MR 013 sc
14	Fünf Duette	Five duets		soprano; alto; piano	1894	Lied		MR 014 sc
14b	"Ich stehe hoch über'm See"			bass; piano	1894	Lied	by Fr. v. Lieven	MR 015
15	Zehn Lieder	Ten songs		medium voice; piano	1894	Lied		MR 016 sc
16	Suite (No. 1)		E minor		1894–95	Organ		MR 017 sc
17	Aus der Jugendzeit Zwanzig kleine Stücke				1895	Piano		MR 018 sc
18	Improvisationen	Eight Improvisations			1896	Piano		MR 019 sc
19	Zwei geistliche Gesänge	Two sacred songs		medium voice; organ	1898	Lied		MR 020 sc
20	Fünf Humoresken	Five Humoresques			1898	Piano		MR 021 sc
21	Hymne an den Gesang			choir; orchestra	1898	Choral	by Steiner	MR 022 sc
22	Sechs Walzer	Six waltzes		4-hand piano	1898	Piano		MR 023 sc
23	Vier Lieder	Four songs			1898	Lied		MR 024 sc
24	Six Morceaux	Six pieces			1898	Piano		MR 025 sc
25	Aquarellen Kleine Tonbilder	Aquarellen			1897–98	Piano		MR 026 sc
26	Sieben Fantasiestücke	Seven fantasy pieces			1898	Piano		MR 027 sc
27	Phantasie über den Choral "Ein' feste Burg ist unser Gott"	Chorale fantasia			1898	Organ (Note: Op. 27 for organreworked for piano 4-hand by Richard Lange)		MR 028 sc
28	Cello Sonata (No. 2)		G minor		1898	Chamber		MR 029 sc
29	Phantasie und Fuge	Fantasia and fugue	C minor		1898	Organ		MR 030 sc
30	Phantasie über den Choral "Freu dich sehr, o meine Seele"	Chorale fantasia			1898	Organ		MR 031 sc
31	Sechs Gedichte von Anna Ritter	Six poems		medium voice; piano	1898	Lied	by Anna Ritter	MR 032 sc
32	Sieben Charakterstücke	Seven character pieces			1899	Piano		MR 033 sc
33	Organ Sonata (No. 1)		F♯ minor		1899	Organ		MR 034 sc
34	Cinq Pièces pittoresques	Five pittoresque pieces		4-hand piano	1899	Piano		MR 035 sc
35	Sechs Lieder	Six songs		medium voice; piano	1899	Lied		MR 036 sc
36	Bunte Blätter Kleine Stücke				1899	Piano		MR 037 sc
37	Fünf Gesänge	Five songs			1899	Lied		MR 038 sc
38	Sieben Männerchöre	Seven songs for men's chorus			1899	Choral		MR 039 sc
39	Drei Chöre	Three songs		SAATBB	1899	Choral		MR 040 sc
40	Zwei Choralphantasien	Two chorale fantasias			1899	Organ		MR 041 sc
41	Violin Sonata (No. 3)		A major		1899	Chamber		MR 042 sc
42	Vier Sonaten	Four sonatas		violin solo	1900	Chamber		MR 043 sc
43	Acht Lieder	Eight songs		medium voice; piano	1900	Lied		MR 044 sc
44	Zehn kleine Vortragsstücke zum Gebrauch beim Unterricht	Ten little pieces			1900	Piano		MR 045 sc
45	Sechs Intermezzi	Six intermezzos			1900	Piano		MR 046 sc
46	Phantasie und Fuge über B-A-C-H	Fantasia and fugue on B-A-C-H			1900	Organ		MR 047 sc
47	Sechs Trios	Six trios			1900	Organ		MR 048 sc
48	Sieben Lieder	Seven songs		medium voice; piano	1900	Lied		MR 049 sc
49	Zwei Klarinettensonaten	Two clarinet sonatas		clarinet / viola; piano	1900	Chamber		MR 050 sc
50	Zwei Romanzen	Two romances		violin; small orchestra	1900	Concerto		MR 051 sc
51	Zwölf Lieder	Twelve songs			1900	Lied		MR 052 sc
52	Drei Choralphantasien	Three chorale fantasias			1900	Organ		MR 053 sc
53	Silhouetten Sieben Stücke	Seven Silhouettes			1900	Piano		MR 054 sc
54/1	String Quartet (No. 1)		G minor		1901	Chamber		sc
54/2	String Quartet (No. 2)		A major		1901	Chamber		sc
55	15 Lieder	15 songs			1901	Lied		MR 055 sc
56	Fünf leicht ausführbare Präludien und Fugen	Five preludes and fugues			1901	Organ		MR 056 sc
57	Symphonische Phantasie und Fuge	Symphonic Fantasy and Fugue			1901	Organ		MR 057 sc
58	Sechs Burlesken	Six Burlesques		4-hand piano	1900	Piano		MR 058 sc
59	Zwölf Stücke	Twelve pieces			1901	Organ		MR 059 sc
60	Organ Sonata (No. 2)		D minor		1901	Organ		MR 060 sc
61	Leicht ausführbare Kompositionen zum gottesdienstlichen Gebrauch	Easy pieces for use in church service			1901	Choral		MR 061
61a	Acht "Tantum ergo"	Eight settings of "Tantum ergo"			1901	Choral	Tantum ergo	sc
61b	Vier "Tantum ergo"	Four settings of "Tantum ergo"		SA / TB; organ	1901	Choral	Tantum ergo	sc
61c	Vier "Tantum ergo"	Four settings of "Tantum ergo"		SATB; organ	1901	Choral	Tantum ergo	sc
61d	Acht Marienlieder	Eight songs to Mary			1901	Choral		sc
61e	Vier Marienlieder	Four songs to Mary		SA / TB; organ	1901	Choral		sc
61f	Vier Marienlieder	Four songs to Mary		SATB; organ	1901	Choral		sc
61g	Vier Trauergesänge	Four funeral songs			1901	Choral		sc
62	16 Gesänge	16 songs			1901	Lied		MR 062 sc
63	Monologe Zwölf Stücke	Monologues			1902	Organ		MR 063 sc
64	Piano Quintet (No. 2)		C minor		1901–02	Chamber		MR 064 sc
65	Zwölf Stücke	Twelve pieces			1902	Organ		MR 065 sc
66	Zwölf Lieder	Twelve songs			1902	Lied		MR 066 sc
67	Zweiundfünfzig leicht ausführbare Vorspiele zu den gebräuchlichsten evangelischen Chorälen	52 chorale preludes			1902	Organ		MR 067 sc
68	Sechs Gesänge	Six songs			1902	Lied		MR 068 sc
69	Zehn Stücke für die Orgel	Ten organ pieces			1902	Organ		MR 069 sc
70	17 Gesänge	17 songs			1902	Lied		MR 070 sc
71	Gesang der Verklärten			SSATB; orchestra	1903	Choral	by Busse	MR 071 sc
72	Violin Sonata (No. 4)		C major		1903	Chamber		MR 072 sc
73	Variations and Fugue on an Original Theme				1903	Organ		MR 073 sc
74	String Quartet (No. 3)		D minor		1903–04	Chamber		MR 074 sc
75	18 Lieder	18 songs			1904	Lied		MR 075 sc
76	Schlichte Weisen	Simple songs			1903–12	Lied		MR 076 sc
77a	Serenade (No. 1)		D major	flute; violin; viola	1904	Chamber		MR 082 sc
77b	String Trio (No. 1)		A minor		1904	Chamber		MR 083 sc
78	Cello Sonata (No. 3)		F major		1904	Chamber		MR 084 sc
79	Haus- und Kirchenmusik				1900–04	Piano		MR 085
79a	Kompositionen				1900–04	Piano		MR 086 sc
79b	Kompositionen [Choralvorspiele]	Chorale preludes			1900–04	Organ		MR 087 sc
79c	Kompositionen	Eight songs			1900–04	Lied		MR 088 sc
79d	Kompositionen			violin; piano	1902–04	Chamber		MR 089 sc
79e	Kompositionen			cello; piano	1902–04	Chamber		MR 090 sc
79f	Kompositionen	14 chorales			1900–04	Choral		MR 091
79g	Kompositionen (Drei Choräle)	Three chorales		high voices	1900–04	Choral		MR 092
80	Zwölf Stücke	Twelve pieces			1904	Organ		MR 093 sc
81	Variationen und Fuge über ein Thema von Joh. Seb. Bach	from Auf Christi Himmelfahrt allein, BWV 128/4			1904	Piano		MR 094 sc
82	Aus meinem Tagebuche (Four volumes)	From my diary			1904–12	Piano		MR 095; MR 096; MR 097; MR 098 sc
83	Zehn Gesänge	Ten songs		men's chorus	1904–12	Choral		MR 099 sc
84	Violin Sonata (No. 5)		F♯ minor		1905	Chamber		MR 100 sc
85	Vier Präludien und Fugen	Four preludes and fugues			1905	Organ		MR 101 sc
86	Variationen und Fuge über ein Thema von Beethoven			two pianos	1904	Piano		MR 102 sc
86	Variationen und Fuge über ein Thema von Beethoven			two pianos	1915	Orchestral		MR 103
87	Zwei Kompositionen			violin; piano	1905	Chamber		MR 104sc
88	Vier Gesänge	Four songs			1905	Lied		MR 105 sc
89	Vier Sonatinen	Four sonatinas		two pianos (Note: also in orchestral arrangement, 1915)	1905–08	Piano		MR 106 sc
90	Sinfonietta		A major	two pianos (Note: also in orchestral arrangement, 1915)	1904–05	Orchestral		MR 107 sc
91	Seven Violin Sonatas			violin solo	1905	Chamber		MR 108 sc
92	Suite (No. 2)		G minor		1905	Organ		MR 109 sc
93	Suite im alten Stil	Suite in old style	F major	violin; piano; (Note: also in orchestral arrangement, 1916)	1906	Chamber		MR 110 sc
94	Sechs Stücke	Six pieces		4-hand piano	1906	Piano		MR 111 sc
95	Serenade		G major		1905–06	Orchestral		MR 112 sc
96	Introduction, Passacaglia and Fugue		B minor	two pianos	1906	Piano		MR 113 sc
97	Vier Lieder	Four songs			1906	Lied		MR 114 sc
98	Fünf Gesänge	Five songs			1906	Lied		MR 115 sc
99	Six Preludes and Fugues			piano	1907	Piano		MR 116 sc
100	Variations and Fugue on a Theme by Hiller		E major		1907	Orchestral		MR 117 sc
101	Violin Concerto		A major		1907–08	Concerto		MR 118 sc
102	Piano Trio (No. 2)		E minor	violin; cello; piano	1907–08	Chamber		MR 119 sc
103	Hausmusik			violin; piano	1908–09	Chamber		MR 120 sc
103a	Suite		A minor	violin; piano	1908	Chamber		MR 121 sc
103b/1	Violin Sonata (No. 6)		D minor		1909	Chamber		MR 122 scsc
103b/2	Violin Sonata (No. 7)		A major		1909	Chamber		MR 122
103c	Zwölf kleine Stücke nach eigenen Liedern	Twelve little pieces on his own songs from Op. 76		violin; piano	1909	Chamber		MR 123 sc
104	Sechs Lieder	Six songs			1907	Lied		MR 124 sc
105	Zwei Geistliche Lieder	Two sacred songs		mezzo / baritone; organ / harmonium / piano	1907	Lied		MR 125 sc
106	Der 100. Psalm	Psalm 100	D major	choir; orchestra; (Note: Organ version of François Callebout (2003))	1908–09	Choral	Psalm 100	MR 126 sc
107	Clarinet sonata (No. 3)		B♭ major	clarinet / viola; piano	1908–09	Chamber		MR 127 sc
108	Symphonischer Prolog zu einer Tragödie	Symphonic prologue to a tragedy			1908	Orchestral		MR 128 sc
109	String Quartet (No. 4)		E♭ major		1909	Chamber		MR 129 sc
110	Geistliche Gesänge	Motets for a cappella choir			1909–12	Choral		sc
110/1	Mein Odem ist schwach			SSATTBB	1909	Choral	Book of Job	MR 130
110/2	Ach, Herr, strafe mich nicht			SSATTBB	1911	Choral	Psalm	MR 131
110/3	O Tod, wie bitter bist du			SSATB	1912	Choral	Ecclesiasticus	MR 132
111a	Mehrstimmige Gesänge für Frauenstimmen			soprano; alto; piano	1909	Lied		MR 133
111a	Drei Duette	Three duets		soprano; alto; piano	1909	Lied		MR 134 sc
111b	Drei Gesänge	Three songs		4-part female choir	1909	Choral		MR 135 sc
111c	Drei Gesänge	Three songs		3-part female choir	1909	Choral		MR 136 sc
112	Die Nonnen	The Nuns		choir; orchestra	1909	Choral	by Boelitz	MR 137 sc
113	Piano Quartet (No. 1)		D minor		1910	Chamber		MR 138 sc
114	Piano Concerto		F minor		1910	Concerto		MR 139 sc
115	Acht Episoden Klavierstücke für grosse und kleine Leute	Eight Episodes			1910	Piano		MR 140 sc
116	Cello Sonata (No. 4)		A minor		1910	Chamber		MR 141 sc
117	Präludien und Fugen für Violine solo	Eight preludes and fugues		violin	1909–12	Chamber		MR 142 sc
118	String Sextet		F major		1910	Chamber		MR 143 sc
119	Die Weihe der Nacht			alto; men's choir; orchestra	1911	Choral	by Hebbel	MR 144 sc
120	Eine Lustspielouvertüre	Comedy Overture			1911	Orchestral		MR 145 sc
121	String Quartet (No. 5)		F♯ minor		1911	Chamber		MR 146 sc
122	Violin Sonata (No. 8)		E minor		1911	Chamber		MR 147 sc
123	Konzert im alten Stil	Concerto in old style	F major		1912	Orchestral		MR 148 sc
124	"An die Hoffnung"			alto / mezzo; orchestra / piano	1912	Lied	by Hölderlin	MR 149 sc
125	Eine romantische Suite	A romantic suite			1912	Orchestral		MR 150 sc
126	Römischer Triumphgesang			men's choir; orchestra	1912	Choral		MR 151 sc
127	Introduction, Passacaglia and Fugue		E minor		1913	Organ		MR 152 sc
128	Vier Tondichtungen nach A. Böcklin	Four Tone Poems after Arnold Böcklin			1913	Orchestral		MR 153 sc
129	Neun Stücke	Nine pieces			1913	Organ		MR 154 sc
130	Eine Ballett-Suite	A Ballet Suite	D major		1913	Orchestral		MR 155 sc
131a	Präludien und Fugen	Six preludes and fugues		violin	1914	Chamber		MR 156 sc
131b	Three duos (canons and fugues) in old style			two violins	1914	Chamber		MR 157 sc
131c	Drei Suiten	Three suites		cello	1915	Chamber		MR 158 sc
131d	Drei Suiten	Three suites		viola	1915	Chamber		MR 159
132	Variations and Fugue on a Theme by Mozart			(Note: also in arrangement for two pianos, 1914)	1914	Orchestral		MR 160 sc
132a	Variations and Fugue on a Theme by Mozart			two pianos	1914	piano		MR 161
133	Piano Quartet (No. 2)		A minor		1914	Chamber		MR 162 sc
134	Variations and Fugue on a Theme by Telemann				1914	Piano		MR 163 sc
135a	Dreißig kleine Choralvorspiele zu den gebräuchlichsten Chorälen	Thirty little chorale preludes			1914	Organ		MR 164 sc
135b	Phantasie und Fuge	Fantasy and Fugue	D minor		1916	Organ		MR 165 sc
136	Hymnus der Liebe			baritone / alto; orchestra	1914	Lied		MR 166 sc
137	Zwölf geistliche Lieder	Twelve sacred songs		voice; piano / harmonium / organ	1914	Lied		MR 167sc
138	Acht geistliche Gesänge	Eight sacred songs		4–8-part choir	1914	Choral		MR 168 sc
139	Violin Sonata (No. 9)		C minor		1915	Chamber		MR 169 sc
140	Eine vaterländische Ouvertüre				1915	Orchestral		MR 170 sc
141a	Serenade (No. 2)		G major	flute; violin; viola	1915	Chamber		MR 171 sc
141b	String Trio (No. 2)		D minor		1915	Chamber		MR 172 sc
142	Fünf neue Kinderlieder	Five new children's songs			1915	Lied		MR 173 sc
143	Träume am Kamin Zwölf kleine Stücke	Twelve little piano pieces			1915	Piano		MR 174 sc
144	Zwei Gesänge	Two songs		baritone; choir; orchestra	1915	Choral		MR 175 sc
144a	Der Einsiedler	The hermit		baritone; choir; orchestra	1915	Choral	by Eichendorff	MR 176 sc
144b	Requiem			alto / baritone; choir; orchestra; (Note: Organ version of Max Beckschäfer (1985))	1915	Choral	by Hebbel	MR 177 sc
145	Sieben Stücke für Orgel	Seven organ pieces			1915–16	Organ		MR 178 sc
145a (Note: opus number 145a assigned by the publisher, WoO V/9)	Lateinisches Requiem	fragment: Kyrie, Dies irae	D minor	soloists; choir; orchestra	1914	Choral	Requiem	MR 216 sc
146	Clarinet Quintet		A major		1915–16	Chamber		MR 179 sc
147	Andante and Rondo			violin; orchestra	1916	Concerto		sc
WoO; I/6	Scherzino		C major	horn; strings	1899	Chamber		MR 183
WoO; I/9	Wind Serenade (first movement)		B♭ major		1904	Chamber		
WoO; II/1	Scherzo		G minor	flute; string quartet	1888 or 1889	Chamber		
WoO; II/2	String Quartet (No. 0)		D minor	string quartet; double bass (in final mvmt.)	1888–89	Chamber		MR 184
WoO; II/6	Scherzo		G minor	2 string quartets	1890/1892	Chamber		
WoO; II/9	Piano Quintet (No. 1)		C minor		1897/98	Chamber		MR 185
WoO; II/10	Romanze		G major	violin; piano	1901	Chamber		MR 187
WoO; II/11	Petite caprice		G minor	violin; piano	1901	Chamber		MR 188
WoO; II/12	Tarantella		G minor	clarinet / violin; piano	1901/1902	Chamber		MR 188
WoO; II/13	Albumblatt		E♭ major	clarinet (violin); piano	1902	Chamber		MR 195
WoO; II/14	Allegretto grazioso		A major	flute; piano	1902	Chamber		MR 194
WoO; II/15	Caprice		A minor	cello; piano	1902	Chamber		MR 193
WoO; II/16	Prelude and Fugue		A minor	violin	1902	Chamber		MR 190
WoO; II/18	Allegro		A major	two violins	1907?	Chamber		MR 189
WoO; II/19	Prelude		E minor	violin	1915	Chamber		MR 192
WoO; III/4	Canons in all major and minor tonalities				1895	Piano		MR 196
WoO; III/6	Grüße an die Jugend				1898	Piano		MR 198
WoO; III/7	Liebestraum				1898	Piano		MR 182
WoO; III/9	Miniature Gavotte				1898	Piano		MR 199
WoO; III/11	Improvisation über den Walzer von Johann Strauß "An der schönen blauen Donau"				1898	Piano		MR 200
WoO; III/12	Blätter und Blüten				1900–02	Piano		MR 202
WoO; III/13	Vier Spezialstudien für die linke Hand				1901	Piano		MR 204
WoO; III/18	In der Nacht				1902	Piano		MR 205
WoO; III/19	Perpetuum mobile		C♯ minor		1905	Piano		MR 206
WoO; III/20	Scherzo		F♯ minor		1906	Piano		MR 207
WoO; III/21	Caprice		F♯ minor		1906	Piano		MR 208
WoO; III/23	Ewig Dein!				1907	Piano		MR 181
WoO; III/24	Fughetta on the "Deutschlandlied"				1916	Piano		MR 209
WoO; V/4 No. 1	Choralkantate "Vom Himmel hoch, da komm ich her"			soloists; children's choir; congregation; two violins; organ	1903	Choral	by Martin Luther	MR 210
WoO; V/4 No. 2	Choralkantate "O wie selig seid ihr doch, ihr Frommen"			S A T B; SATB; congregation; two violins; organ	1903	Choral	by Simon Dach	MR 211
WoO; V/4 No. 3	Choralkantate "O Haupt voll Blut und Wunden"			A T; SATB; congregation; violin; oboe; organ	1904	Choral	by Paul Gerhardt	MR 212
WoO; V/4 No. 4	Choralkantate "Meinem Jesum lass ich nicht"			S; SATB; violin; viola; organ	1906	Choral	by Christian Keimann	MR 213
WoO; V/4 No. 5	Choralkantate "Auferstanden, auferstanden"			S A T B; SATB; organ		Choral	by Lavater	MR 214
WoO; V/6	Weihegesang		A major	A; SATB; winds	1908	Choral	by Otto Liebmann	MR 215
WoO; VI/2	Tantum ergo			5-part choir	1895	Choral	Tantum ergo	MR 217
WoO; VI/3	"Gloriabuntur in te omnes"				1898?	Choral		MR 218
WoO; VI/6	Fünf ausgewählte Volkslieder			TTBB	1898	Choral		MR 237
WoO; VI/7	Neun ausgewählte Volkslieder			men's choir	1899	Choral		MR 238
WoO; VI/10	Sechs ausgewählte Volkslieder				1899	Choral		MR 234
WoO; VI/11	Acht ausgewählte Volkslieder				1899	Choral		MR 235
WoO; VI/12	Maria, Himmelsfreud!				1900	Choral	by Heuberger	MR 219
WoO; VI/13	Zwölf deutsche geistliche Gesänge				1900	Choral		MR 232
WoO; VI/14	Sieben geistliche Volkslieder				1900	Choral		MR 231
WoO; VI/16	Sechs drei- und fünfstimmige Lieder für Passion und Ostern				1900?	Choral		MR 226
WoO; VI/17	Der evangelische Kirchenchor				1901	Choral		MR 233
WoO; VI/18	Palmsonntagsmorgen			5-part choir	1902	Choral	by Geibel	MR 220
WoO; VI/19	Komm heiiger Geist				1902?	Choral		MR 229
WoO; VI/20	Vier Kirchengesänge				1904	Choral		MR 230
WoO; VI/24	Lasset uns den Herren preisen			5-part choir	1911	Choral	by Rist	MR 221
WoO; VI/27	Abschiedslied				1914	Choral		MR 222
WoO; VII/18	Am Meer				1894	Lied		MR 245
WoO; VII/19	Wiegenlied				1899	Lied		MR 247
WoO; VII/20	In verschwiegener Nacht				1899	Lied		MR 246
WoO; VII/23	Bettgeflüster				1899?	Lied		MR 250
WoO; VII/25	Brautring				1900?	Lied		MR 248
WoO; VII/26	Geheimnis				1900?	Lied		MR 249
WoO; VII/30	Zwei geistliche Lieder				1908	Choral		MR 240
WoO; VII/33	Schlummerlied	Wedding song			1902?	Lied		MR 252
WoO; VII/34	Befiehl dem Herrn deine Wege	Wedding song		soprano; alto; organ	1902	Lied		MR 241
WoO; VII/36	Geistiches Lied "Wohl denen"				1903	Lied		MR 242
WoO; VII/37	Ehre sei Gott in der Höhe	(Weihnachtslied)			1905	Lied		MR 243
WoO; VII/43	Es soll mein Gebet dich tragen				1909	Lied		MR 244
WoO; VIII/13	Sylvester-Kanons				1913	Choral		MR 180

== Other works ==
- Castra vetera, incidental music (1889-1890)
- Heroide, symphonic movement for orchestra, D minor (1889)
- Symphonic movement for orchestra, D minor (1890)
- Grande Valse de Concert for piano, "Op. 378" (1891)
- Six chorale preludes for organ (1893–1908)
1. "O Traurigkeit"
2. "Komm, süßer Tod"
3. "Christ ist erstanden"
4. "O Haupt voll Blut und Wunden"
5. "Es kommt ein Schiff, geladen"
6. "Wie schön leucht't uns der Morgenstern"
- Violin parts for six sonatinas, Op. 36 by Clementi (before 1895)
- Etude Brillante for piano, C minor (1896)
- Three Album Leafs for piano (1898/1899)
1. Miniature Gavotte (s.a.)
2. Allegretto grazioso
3. Andante
- Introduction and Passacaglia for organ, D minor (1899)
- Prelude for organ, C minor (1900)
- Three sacred songs for mezzo / baritone and organ (1900/1903)
- Variations and Fugue on "Heil unserm König Heil" and "Heil dir im siegerkranz" (God Save The King) for organ, C major (1901)
- Fünf Spezialstudien (Bearbeitungen Chopin'scher Werke) (1898–1899) MR203
- Four pieces for piano (1901/1906)
1. Romanze, D major (1906)
2. Improvisation, E minor (1901)
3. Nachtstück (1903)
4. Perpetuum mobile, C major (1902)
- Prelude and Fugue for organ, D minor, (1902)
- Romanze for harmonium, A minor (1904)
- Two pieces for piano (1906)
1. Caprice, F♯ minor
- Prelude and fugue for organ, G♯ minor (1906)
- Vater unser for 12-part choir (1909) (completed by Hasse)
- An Zeppelin for 4-part men's or children's choir (1909)
- Twenty Responsories for choir (1911)
- Prelude and fugue for organ, F♯ minor (1912)
- Marsch der Stiftsdamen for piano (1914)

== Details of sets of compositions with Opus number ==
- Sechs Lieder (Six songs), Op. 4 (1892)
1. "Gebet" (Hebbel)
2. "Widmung" (Rückert)
3. "Winterahnung" (Rückert)
4. "Im April" (Geibel)
5. "Der zerrißne Grabkranz" (Greif)
6. "Bitte" (unknown)

- Drei Orgelstücke (Three organ pieces), Op. 7 (1892)
1. Prelude and Fugue, C major
2. Fantasy on 'Te Deum laudamus', A minor
3. Fugue, D minor

- Fünf Lieder (Five songs), Op. 8 (1892)
1. "Waldlied" (Uhland)
2. "Tränen im Auge" (v. Wildenbruch)
3. "Der Kornblumenstrauss" (v. Wildenbruch)
4. "Scherz" (v. Chamisso)
5. "Bauernregel" (Uhland)

- Twelve Waltz-Caprices for 4-hand Piano, Op. 9 (1892)
1. Allegro, A major
2. Presto, D major
3. Andante (con passione), F♯ minor
4. Lento impetuoso, F♯ major
5. Allegro moderato (quasi andantino), D major
6. Prestissimo, A major
7. Moderato, C♯ minor
8. Allegro non tanto, A♭ major
9. Andantino, E♭ major
10. Vivace, B♭ minor
11. Allegro scherzando, A♭ major
12. Allegro impetuoso, D♭ major

- Zwanzig Deutsche Tänze (Twenty German Dances) for 4-hand piano, Op. 10 (1892) (also in orchestral arrangement for small orchestra by L. Artok)
1. Allegretto, D major
2. G minor
3. Innocente, A major
4. D minor
5. Con anima ed scherzando, E major
6. Allegro, C♯ minor
7. Cantabile, A♭ major
8. Appassionato, F minor
9. Allegretto, B♭ major
10. Grazioso andantino, D major
11. Impetuoso, E major
12. Allegretto, A major
13. Andantino ma non troppo, B minor
14. Innocente, F major
15. Scherzando, G minor
16. Appassionato (non allegro), F minor
17. Andantino, A♭ major
18. Presto, C♯ minor
19. Giocoso, B major
20. Con bravoura, E major

- Seven Waltzes for piano, Op. 11 (1893)
1. Allegro ma non troppo, A major (also in arrangement for violin and piano by S. Dushkin)
2. Semplice, C♯ minor
3. Moderato, D major
4. Grazioso, A♭ major
5. Commodo, E major
6. Melancolique (Lento), F♯ minor
7. Allegro vivace, A major

- Five songs (in the style of Franz Schubert), Op. 12 (1893)
1. "Friedhofgesang" (Kleinschmidt)
2. "Das arme Vögelein" (v. Gilm)
3. "Wenn ich's nur wüsst" (Ehlen)
4. "Gruß" (Michaeli)
5. "Um dich" (Kurz)

- Lose Blätter for piano, Op. 13 (1894)
1. Petite Romance (Andante), F minor
2. Valsette (Allegretto grazioso), A♭ major
3. Scherzoso (Vivace), B♭ major
4. Moment Musical (Andantino), A♭ major
5. Petite Caprice (Allegretto), B{{music|flat minor
6. Prélude et Fugue (Andantino (semplice) – Allegretto), F major
7. Sarabande (Grave), D minor
8. (Largo), B minor
9. Danse des Paysans (Commodo), A major
10. Chant sans Paroles, E major
11. Appassionato (Vivace), C♯ minor
12. Choral (Andante), D major
13. Marcia Funèbre, C minor (also in orchestral arrangement by Lothar Windsperger)
14. À la Hongroise (Allegro), F minor

- Five duets for soprano, alto and piano, Op. 14 (1894)
1. "Nachts" (Eichendorff)
2. "Abendlied" (Goethe)
3. "Sommernacht" (Saul)
4. "Gäb's ein einzig Brünnelein" (from Tuscany)
5. "O frage nicht" (Nawrocki)

- Ten songs for medium voice and piano, Op. 15 (1894)
1. "Glück" (Rohrscheidt)
2. "Das Blatt im Buche" (Grün)
3. "Nelken" (Storm)
4. "Traum" (Eichendorff)
5. "Das Mädchen spricht" (Prutz)
6. "Scheiden" (Saul)
7. "Der Schelm" (R.)
8. "Leichtsinniger Rat" (Saul)
9. "Verlassen hab' ich mein Lieb" (Engel)
10. "Trost" (Falke)

- Suite for organ No. 1, E minor, Op. 16 (1894–1895) (also in 4-hand piano arrangement by Reger)
1. Introduction (Grave) and Fugue (Allegro ma non tanto)
2. Adagio assai
3. Intermezzo (Un poco Allegro, ma non troppo) and Trio (Andantino)
4. Passacaglia (Andante)

- Aus der Jugendzeit for piano, Op. 17 (1895)
1. Frohsinn (Allegretto), A major
2. Hasche mich! (Grazioso), C major
3. Ein Spielchen! (Andantino), F major
4. Das tote Vöglein (Andante espressivo), E minor
5. Über Stock und Stein (Presto), D minor
6. Was die Grossmutter erzählt (Andante espressivo), G major
7. Ein Tänzchen (Allegro), G minor
8. Bange Frage (Andante), A minor
9. Weihnachtstraum (Andantino), A major (Fantasy on Silent Night)
10. Großes Fest (Allegro à la marcia), B{{music|flat major
11. Abendgesang (Andante con espressione), D major
12. Fast zu keck! (Allegro vivace), F major
13. Frühlingslust (Vivace), C major
14. Kleiner Trotzkopf (Vivace), E minor
15. Reigen (Allegretto grazioso), G major
16. Fast zu ernst! (Fughette – Andante con espressione), G minor
17. A la Gigue (Presto assai), E minor
18. Nordischer Tanz (Allegretto), D major
19. Erster Streit (Agitato), D minor
20. Versöhnung (Cantabile), A major

- Eight improvisations for piano, Op. 18 (1896)
1. Allegretto con grazia, E major
2. Andantino, B minor
3. Caprice (Allegro vivace), G minor
4. Andante sepmlice, D major
5. Moderato, ma marcato, C minor
6. Allegretto con grazia, C♯ minor
7. Vivace assai, F major
8. Etude brillante (Allegro con brio), C minor

- Two sacred songs for medium voice and organ, Op. 19 (1898)
1. "Passionslied"
2. "Doch du ließest ihn im Grabe nicht!"

- Five Humoresques for piano, Op. 20 (1898)
1. Allegretto grazioso, D major
2. Presto – Andante (con grandezza), B minor
3. Andantino grazioso, A major
4. Prestissimo assai, C major
5. Vivace assai, G minor

- Six Waltzes for 4-hand piano, Op. 22 (1898)
1. Allegro, E major
2. Più vivace, A major
3. Allegretto, B major
4. Moderato (quasi Andantino), C♯ minor
5. Vivace, B major
6. Allegro vivace, E major

- Four songs, Op. 23 (1898)
1. "Das kleinste Lied" (Hamerling)
2. "Pythia" (Ritter)
3. "Das sterbende Kind" (Geibel)
4. "Vom Küssen!" (Ritter)

- Six pieces for piano, Op. 24 (1898)
1. Valse-Impromptu (Grazioso) E major
2. Menuett (Allegretto grazioso) B minor (reworked for orchestra and salon orchestra by Ernst Schmidt-Köthen)
3. Rêverie fantastique (Quasi improvisato) F♯ minor
4. Un moment musical (Andantino) C major
5. Chant de la nuit (Moderato) E major
6. Rhapsodie (in the style of J. Brahms) (Agitato) E minor

- Aquarellen for piano, Op. 25 (1897–1898)
1. Canzonetta (Allegretto con espressione) A minor
2. Humoreske (Allegro molto e con leggierezza) G major
3. Impromptu (Poco agitato) E minor
4. Nordische Ballade (Pesante) C minor
5. Mazurka (Allegretto grazioso) E♭ major

- Seven fantasy pieces for piano, Op. 26 (1898)
1. Elegie (Andante sostenuto con espressione) E minor (also in orchestral arrangement)
2. Scherzo (Allegro grazioso) E major
3. Barcarole (Andantino) F major
4. Humoreske (Vivace (ma non troppo)) C minor
5. Resignation (Andante espressivo) A major (composed 3 April 1898, the anniversary of Brahms's death, using the main theme from the slow movement of his Symphony No. 4) (reworked for organ by Richard Lange)
6. Impromptu (Presto agitato) B minor
7. Capriccio (Vivace assai) C minor

- Fantasia and Fugue for organ, C minor, Op. 29 (1898) (reworked for Piano 4-hand by Richard Lange)

- Six Poems by Anna Ritter for medium voice, Op. 31 (1898)
1. "Allein"
2. "Ich glaub', lieber Schatz"
3. "Unbegehrt"
4. "Und hab' so große Sehnsucht doch"
5. "Mein Traum"
6. "Schlimme Geschichte"

- Seven character pieces for piano, Op. 32 (1899)
1. Improvisation (Agitato ed appassionato) C♯ minor
2. Capriccio (A study) (Vivace assai) B minor
3. Burleske (Vivo) C major
4. Intermezzo (Agitato ed apassionato (Vivace, ma non troppo)) F♯ minor
5. Intermezzo (Andante) C major
6. Humoreske (Prestissimo assai) G minor
7. Impromptu (Con passione e vivace) B minor

- Five pittoresque pieces for 4-hand piano, Op. 34 (1899)
1. Allegretto con moto B minor
2. Prestissimo A minor
3. Vivace assai G minor
4. Andantino (Con moto) A minor
5. Con moto (Vivace) D minor

- Sechs Lieder (Six songs), Op. 35 (1899)
1. "Dein Auge" (Dahn)
2. "Der Himmel hat eine Thräne geweint" (Rückert)
3. "Traum durch die Dämmerung" (Bierbaum)
4. "Flieder" (Bierbaum)
5. "Du liebes Auge" (Roquette)
6. "Wenn lichter Mondenschein" (D'Annunzio)

- Nine Bunte Blätter for piano, Op. 36 (1899)
1. Humoreske (Vivace assai) G minor
2. Albumblatt (Andantino) F major
3. Capriccietto (Vivace assai) E minor
4. Reigen (Allegretto grazioso) D major
5. Gigue (Vivace assai) A minor
6. Elegie (Andantino sostenuto (ma non troppo)) E minor
7. Valse-Impromptu (Con moto) D minor
8. Capriccio (A study) (Vivace assai) C minor
9. Rêverie (Andante con espressione) F major

- Five songs, Op. 37 (1899)
1. "Helle Nacht" (Verlaine)
2. "Volkslied" (Ritter)
3. "Glückes genug" (Liliencron)
4. "Frauenhaar" (Bierbaum)
5. "Nächtliche Pfade" (Stieler)

- Seven songs for men's chorus, Op. 38 (1899)
1. "Ausfahrt" (Scheffel)
2. "Frühlingsruf" (Kleber)
3. "Über die Berge!" (Ernst)
4. "Wie ist doch die Erde so schön!" (Reinick)
5. "Frohsinn" (after v. Klump)
6. "Abendreihn" (Müller)
7. "Hell ins Fenster" (Groth)

- Three songs for 6-part (SAATBB) choir, Op. 39 (1899)
1. "Schweigen" (Falke)
2. "Abendlied" (Plinke)
3. "Frühlingsblick" (Lenau)

- Four violin solo sonatas, Op. 42 (1900)
1. D minor
2. A major
3. B minor
4. G minor

- Eight songs, Op. 43 (1900)
1. "Zwischen zwei Nächten" (Falke)
2. "Müde" (Falke)
3. "Meinem Kinde" (Falke)
4. "Abschied" (Wiener)
5. "Wiegenlied" (Dehmel) (also in orchestral arrangement)
6. "Die Betrogene spricht" (Ritter)
7. "Mein Herz" (Wiener)
8. "Sag es nicht" (Wiener)

- Ten little pieces for piano, Op. 44 (1900)
1. Albumblatt (Mit Ausdruck, nicht zu langsam) B minor
2. Burletta (Sehr lebhaft, mit Humor) G minor
3. Es war einmal (Mässig langsam und ausdrucksvoll) E minor
4. Capriccio (Sehr rasch) A minor
5. Moment musical (Anmutig, etwas lebhaft) C♯ minor
6. Scherzo (Sehr schnell) D major
7. Humoreske (Lebhaft) B minor
8. Fughette (Mässig langsam) A minor
9. Gigue (So schnell als möglich) D minor
10. Capriccio (Sehr schnell; mit Humor) C major

- Six intermezzi for piano, Op. 45 (1900)
1. (Sehr aufgeregt und schnell) D minor
2. (Äußerst lebhaft, anmutig) D♭ major
3. (Langsam, mit leidenschaftlichem, durchaus phantastischem Ausdruck) E♭ minor
4. (So schnell als möglich, mit Humor) C major
5. (Mit großer Leidenschaft und Energie) G minor
6. (So schnell als nur irgend möglich) E minor

- Six organ trios, Op. 47 (1900)
1. Canon (Andante) E major
2. Gigue (Vivacissimo) D minor
3. Canzonetta (Andantino) A minor
4. Scherzo (Vivacissimo) A major
5. Siciliano (Andantino) E minor
6. Fugue (Vivace) C minor

- Seven songs for medium voice, Op. 48 (1900)
1. "Hütet euch" (Geibel)
2. "Leise Lieder" (Morgenstern)
3. "Im Arm der Liebe" (Hartleben)
4. "Ach, Liebster, in Gedanken" (Stona)
5. "Junge Ehe" (Ubell) (on a theme from Wagner's Tristan und Isolde)
6. "Am Dorfsee" (Wiener)
7. "Unvergessen" (Frey)

- Two clarinet sonatas, Op. 49 (1900)
1. A♭ major
2. F♯ minor

- Two romances for violin and small orchestra, Op. 50 (1900)
1. (Andante sostenuto) G major
2. (Larghetto) D major

- Twelve songs, Op. 51 (1900)
1. "Der Mond glüht" (Diderich)
2. "Mägdleins Frage" (Dorr-Ljubljaschtschi)
3. "Träume, träume, du mein süßes Leben!" (Dehmel)
4. "Geheimnis" (Evers)
5. "Mädchenlied" (Morgenstern)
6. "Schmied Schmerz" (Bierbaum)
7. "Nachtgang" (Bierbaum)
8. "Gleich einer versunkenen Melodie" (Morgenstern)
9. "Frühlingsregen" (Morgenstern)
10. "Verlorne Liebe" (Galli)
11. "Frühlingsmorgen" (Müller)
12. "Weiße Tauben" (Morgenstern)

- Seven Silhouettes for piano, Op. 53 (1900)
1. (Äußerst lebhaft) E minor
2. (Ziemlich langsam) D major
3. (Sehr bewegt und ausdrucksvoll) F♯ major
4. (Sehr schnell und anmutig) F♯ minor
5. (Ziemlich schnell) C major
6. (Langsam, schwermütig) E major
7. (Äußerst lebhaft und mit viel Humor) B major

- Fifteen songs, Op. 55 (1901)
1. "Hymnus des Hasses" (Morgenstern)
2. "Traum" (Evers)
3. "Der tapfere Schneider" (Falke)
4. "Rosen" (Itzerott)
5. "Der Narr" (v. Jacobosky)
6. "Verklärung" (Itzerott)
7. "Sterne" (Ritter)
8. "Zwei Gänze" (De Capitolio)
9. "Ein Paar" (Braungart)
10. "Wären wir zwei klein Vögel" (Greiner)
11. "Viola d'amour" (Falke)
12. "Nachtsegen" (Evars)
13. "Gute Nacht" (Falke)
14. "Allen Welten abgewandt" (Stona)
15. "Der Alte" (Falke)

- Five organ preludes and fugues, Op. 56 (1901)
1. E major
2. D minor
3. G major
4. C major
5. B minor

- Twelve organ pieces, Op. 59 (1901)
1. Prelude
2. Pastorale
3. Intermezzo
4. Kanon
5. Toccata
6. Fuge
7. Kyrie
8. Gloria
9. Benedictus
10. Capriccio
11. Melodia
12. Te Deum

- Organ Sonata No. 2, D minor, Op. 60 (1901)
1. Improvisation
2. Invocation
3. Introduction and Fugue

- 16 songs, Op. 62 (1901)
1. "Wehe" (Boelitz)
2. "Waldeseligkeit" (Dehmel)
3. "Ruhe" (Evers)
4. "Menschen und Natur" (Baumgart)
5. "Wir zwei" (Falke)
6. "Reinheit" (Boelitz)
7. "Vor dem Sterben" (Boelitz)
8. "Gebet" (Braungart)
9. "Strampelchen" (Bluethgen)
10. "Die Nixe" (Falke)
11. "Fromm" (Falke)
12. "Totensprache" (Jacobovsky)
13. "Begegnung" (Mörike)
14. "Ich schwebe" (Henkel)
15. "Pflügerin Sorge" (Henkel)
16. "Anmutiger Vertrag (Morgenstern)

- Monologues for organ, Op. 63 (1902)
1. Prelude, C minor
2. Fugue, C major
3. Canzona, G minor
4. Capriccio, A minor
5. Intro, F minor
6. Passacaglia, F minor
7. Ave Maria
8. Fantasy, C major
9. Toccata, E minor
10. Fugue, E minor
11. Kanon, D major
12. Scherzo, D minor

- Twelve songs, Op. 66 (1902)
1. "Sehnsucht" (Itzerott)
2. "Freundliche Vision" (Bierbaum)
3. "Aus der ferne in der Nacht" (Bierbaum)
4. "Du bist mir gut!" (Boelitz)
5. "Maienblüten" (v. Jacobovsky)
6. "Die Primeln" (Hamerling)
7. "Die Liebe" (Dehmel)
8. "An dich" (Itzerott)
9. "Erlöst" (Itzerott)
10. "Morgen" (Mackay)
11. "Jetzt und immer" (Dehmel)
12. "Kindergeschichte" (v. Jacobovsky)

- Six songs, Op. 68 (1902)
1. "Eine Seele" (Jacobovsky)
2. "Unterwgs" (Boelitz)
3. "Märchenland" (Evers)
4. "Engelwacht" (Muth)
5. "Nachtseele" (Evers)
6. "An die Geliebte" (Falke)

- Ten organ pieces, Op. 69 (1903)
1. Prelude, E minor
2. Fugue, E minor
3. Basso ostinato, E minor
4. Moment musical, D major
5. Capriccio, D minor
6. Toccata, D major
7. Fugue, D major
8. Romance, G minor
9. Prelude, A minor
10. Fugue, A minor

- Seventeen songs, Op. 70 (1903)
1. "Präludium" (Boelitz)
2. "Der König bei der Krönung" (Mörike)
3. "Ritter rät dem Knappen dies" (Bierbaum)
4. "Die bunten Kühe" (Falke)
5. "Gruß" (Genischen)
6. "Elternstolz" (folk song)
7. "Meine Seele" (Evers)
8. "Die Verschmäte" (Falke)
9. "Sehnsucht" (Jacobovsky)
10. "Hoffnungstrost" (from East Preussia)
11. "Gegen Abend" (Bierbaum)
12. "Dein Bild" (Jacobovsky)
13. "Mein und dein" (Fischer)
14. "Der Bote" (Fick)
15. "Thränen" (Braungart)
16. "Des Durstes Erklärung" (Fick)
17. "Sommernacht" (Evers)

- 18 songs, Op. 75 (1904)
1. "Markspruch" (Weigand)
2. "Mondnacht" (Evers)
3. "Der Knabe an die Mutter" (Serbian)
4. "Dämmer" (Boelitz)
5. "Böses Weib" (16th century)
6. "Ihr, ihr Herrlichen!" (Hölderlin)
7. "Schlimm für die Männer" (Serbian)
8. "Wäsche im Wind" (Falke)
9. "All' mein Gedanken, mein Herz und mein Sinn" (Dahn)
10. "Schwäbische Treue" (Seyboth)
11. "Aeolsharfe" (Lingg)
12. "Hat gesangt – bleibt nicht dabei" (folk song)
13. "Das Ringlein" (Jacobovsky)
14. "Schlafliedchen" (Busse)
15. "Darum" (Seyboth)
16. "Das Fenster klang im Winde!" (Evars)
17. "Du brachtest mir deiner Seele Trank" (Braungart)
18. "Einsamkeit" (Goethe)

- Simple songs, Op. 76 (1903–1912)
1. "Du meines Herzens Krönelein"
2. "Daz tuwer min Engel walte"
3. "Waldeinsamkeit"
4. "Wenn die Linde blüht"
5. "Herzenstausch"
6. "Beim Schneewetter"
7. "Schlecht' Wetter"
8. "Einen Brief soll ich schreiben"
9. "Am Brünnelle"
10. "Warte nur"
11. "Mei Bua"
12. "Mit Rosen bestreut"
13. "Der verliebte Jäger"
14. "Mein Schätzelein"
15. "Maiennacht"
16. "Glück"
17. "Wenn alle Welt so einig wär"
18. "In einem Rosengärtelein"
19. "Hans und Grete"
20. "Es blüht ein Blümlein"
21. "Minnelied"
22. "Des Kindes Gebet"
23. "Zwiesprache"
24. "Abgeguckt"
25. "Friede"
26. "Der Schwur"
27. "Kindeslächeln"
28. "Die Mutter spricht"
29. "Schmeichelkätzchen"
30. "Vorbeimarsch"
31. "Gottes Segen"
32. "Von der Liebe"
33. "Das Wölklein"
34. "Reiterlied"
35. "Mittag"
36. "Schelmenliedchen"
37. "Heimat"
38. "Das Mägdlein"
39. "Abendlied"
40. "Wunsch"
41. "An den Frühlingsregen"
42. "Der Postillon"
43. "Brunnensang"
44. "Klein Marie"
45. "Lutschemäulchen"
46. "Soldatenlied"
47. "Schlaf' ein"
48. "Zwei Mäuschen"
49. "Ein Tänzchen"
50. "Knecht Ruprecht"
51. "Die fünf Hühnerchen"
52. "Mariae Wiegenlied" (also arranged by the composer as a piano solo)
53. "Das Brüderchen"
54. "Das Schwesterchen"
55. "Furchthäschen"
56. "Der Igel"
57. "Die Bienen"
58. "Mäusefangen"
59. "Zum Schlafen"
60. "Der König aus dem Morgenland"

- Ten pieces for piano, Op. 79a (1900–1904)
1. Humoreske
2. Humoreske
3. Intermezzo
4. Melodie
5. Romanze
6. Impromptu
7. Impromptu
8. Caprice
9. Capriccio
10. Melodie

- Chorale preludes for organ, Op. 79b (1900–1904)
1. Ach Gott, verlaß mich nicht
2. Ein feste Burg ist unser Gott
3. Herr, nun selbst den Wagen halt
4. Morgenglanz der Ewigkeit
5. Mit Fried und Freud ich fahr dahin
6. Wer weiß, wie nahe mir mein Ende
7. Auferstehn, ja auferstehn wirst du
8. Christ ist erstanden von dem Tod
9. Christus, der ist mein Leben
10. Mit Fried und Freud ich fahr dahin
11. Nun danket alle Gott
12. Herr, nun selbst den Wagen halt
13. Warum sollt ich mich denn grämen

- Eight songs, Op. 79c (1900–1904)
1. "Abend" (Schäfer)
2. "Um Mitternacht blühen die Blumen" (Stona)
3. "Volkslied" (Itzerott)
4. "Friede" (Huggenberger)
5. "Auf mondbeschienen Wegen" (Huggenberger)
6. "Die Glocke des Glücks" (Ritter)
7. "Erinnerung" (Schäfer)
8. "Züge" (Huggenberger)

- Suite for violin and piano, Op. 79d (1902–1904)
1. Wiegenlied
2. Capriccio
3. Burla

- Two pieces for cello and piano, Op. 79e (1904)
1. Caprice
2. Kleine Romanze

- 14 chorales for 4-, 5- or 6-part choir, Op. 79f (1900–1904)
1. "Jesu, meines Lebens Leben" (4-part)
2. "Auferstanden" (4-part)
3. "Nun preiset alle" (4-part)
4. "Nun preiset alle" (4-part)
5. "Such, wer da will" (4-part)
6. "Ach, Gott, verlaß mich nicht" (4-part)
7. "Ich weiß, mein Gott" (4-part)
8. "Ich hab in Gottes Herz und Sinn" (5-part)
9. "Jesu, großer Wunderstern" (5-part)
10. "Jesus soll die Losung sein" (5-part)
11. "Trauungsgesang"
12. "Auferstanden" (5-part)
13. "Gib dich zufrieden" (5- or 6-part)

- Aus meinem Tagebuch, fünfunddreißig Stücke für Pianoforte, Op. 82 (1904–1912)

Vol. 1, No. 1 Vivace
Vol. 1, No. 2 Adagio
Vol. 1, No. 3 Andante sostenuto
Vol. 1, No. 4 Vivace
Vol. 1, No. 5 "Gavotte" (Moderato)
Vol. 1, No. 6 Sostenuto
Vol. 1, No. 7 Vivace
Vol. 1, No. 8 Andantino—Presto
Vol. 1, No. 9 Vivace
Vol. 1, No. 10 Andante innocente
Vol. 1, No. 11 Sostenuto ed espressivo
Vol. 1, No. 12 Larghetto
Vol. 2, No. 1 Allegretto con grazia
Vol. 2, No. 2 Andantino
Vol. 2, No. 3 Andante espressivo
Vol. 2, No. 4 Andantino
Vol. 2, No. 5 Allegretto con grazia; sempre poco agitato
Vol. 2, No. 6 Andante espressivo
Vol. 2, No. 7 Larghetto
Vol. 2, No. 8 Vivacissimo—Andante—Vivacissimo
Vol. 2, No. 9 Andantino
Vol. 2, No. 10 Scherzando e vivace
Vol. 3, No. 1 "Lied" (Andante sostenuto)
Vol. 3, No. 2 "Albumblatt" (Andante sostenuto)
Vol. 3, No. 3 "Gavotte" (Allegretto)
Vol. 3, No. 4 "Romanza" (Andante sostenuto)
Vol. 3, No. 5 "Melodie" (Andante sostenuto)
Vol. 3, No. 6 "Humoreske" (Vivace)
Vol. 4, No. 1 "Präludium" (Poco con moto)
Vol. 4, No. 2 "Fuge" (Sostenuto)
Vol. 4, No. 3 "Intermezzo" (Andante)
Vol. 4, No. 4 "Arabeske" (Allegretto)
Vol. 4, No. 5 "Silhouette" (Con moto)
Vol. 4, No. 6 "Melodie" (Molto sostenuto)
Vol. 4, No. 7 "Humoreske" (Poco vivace)

- Four preludes and fugues for organ, Op. 85 (1905)
1. C♯ minor
2. G major
3. F major
4. E minor

- Two compositions for violin and piano, Op. 87 (1905)
1. Albumblatt
2. Romanze

- Four songs, Op. 88 (1905)
1. "Notturno" (Boelitz)
2. "Stelldichein" (Hörmann)
3. "Flötenspielerin" (Evers)
4. "Spatz und Spätzin" (Meyere)

- Four sonatinas for piano, Op. 89 (1905–1908)
1. E minor
2. D major
3. F major
4. A minor

- Seven sonatas for violin solo, Op. 91 (1905)
1. A minor
2. D major
3. B♭ major
4. B minor
5. E minor
6. G major
7. A minor

- Suite for organ No. 2, Op. 92 (1905)
1. Prelude, G minor
2. Fugue
3. Intermezzo, B minor
4. Basso ostinato, G minor
5. Romance, A♭ major
6. Toccata, G minor
7. Fugue, G minor

- Four songs, Op. 97 (1906)
1. "Das Dorf" (Boelitz)
2. "Leise, leise weht ihr Lüfte" (Brentano)
3. "Ein Drängen ist in meinem Herzen" (Stefan Zweig)
4. "Der bescheidene Schäfer" (Weisse)

- Five songs, Op. 98 (1906)
1. "Aus den Himmelsaugen" (Heine)
2. "Der gute Rath" (Schatz)
3. "Sonntag" (folk song)
4. "Es schläft ein stiller Garten" (Hauptmann)
5. "Sommernacht" (Triepel)

- Six songs, Op. 104 (1907)
1. "Neue Fülle" (Zweig)
2. "Warnung" (anon.)
3. "Mutter, tote Mutter" (Hartwig)
4. "Lied eines Mädchens" (13th century)
5. "Das Sausewind" (Busse)
6. "Mädchenlied" (Boelitz)

- Two sacred songs for mezzo / baritone and organ / harmonium / piano, Op. 105 (1907)
1. "Ich sehe dich in tausend Bildern" (Novalis)
2. "Meine Seele ist still zu Gott" (Psalm 62)

- Three duets for soprano, alto and piano, Op. 111a (1909)
1. "Waldesstille" (Rafael)
2. "Frühlingsfeier" (Steindorff)
3. "Abendgang" (Brandtl)

- Episodes, eight pieces for piano, Op. 115 (1910)
1. Andante, D major
2. Andante con moto
3. Allegretto, C major
4. Andante sostenuto
5. Larghetto
6. Vivace
7. Vivace quasi presto
8. Vivace

- Eight preludes and fugues for solo violin, Op. 117 (1909–1912)
1. B minor
2. G minor
3. E minor
4. G minor (Chaconne)
5. G major
6. D minor
7. A minor
8. E minor

- Nine pieces for organ, Op. 129 (1913)
1. Toccata, D minor
2. Fugue, D minor
3. Canon, E minor
4. Melodia, B♭ major
5. Capriccio, G minor
6. Basso ostinato, G minor
7. Intermezzo, F minor
8. Prelude, B minor
9. Fugue, B minor

- Six preludes and fugues for solo violin, Op. 131a (1914)
1. A minor
2. D minor
3. G major
4. G minor
5. D major
6. E minor

- Three suites for solo cello, Op. 131c (1915)
1. G major
2. D minor
3. A minor

- Three suites for solo viola, Op. 131d (1915)
1. G minor
2. D major
3. E minor

- Twelve sacred songs with piano / harmonium / organ accompaniment, Op. 137 (1914)
1. "Bitte um einen seligen Tod" (Herman. gest. 1561)
2. "Dein Wille, Herr, geschehe!" (Eichendorff)
3. "Uns ist geboren ein Kindlein" (anon.)
4. "Am Abend" (anon.)
5. "O Herre Gott, nimm du von mir" (anon.)
6. "Christ, deines Geistes Süßigkeit" (anon.)
7. "Grablied" (Arndt)
8. "Morgengesang" (Alberus)
9. "Lass dich nur nichts nicht dauern" (Flemming)
10. "Christkindleins Wiegenlied" (anon.)
11. "Klage vor Gottes Leiden" (v)
12. "O Jesu Christ, wir warten dein" (Alberus)

- 5 Neue Kinderlieder, Op. 142 (1915)
1. "Wiegenlied" (Stein)
2. "Schwalbenmütterlein"(Reinick)
3. "Maria am Rosenstrauch" (Schellenberg)
4. "Klein-Evelinde" (Weber)
5. "Bitte" (Holst)

- Träume am Kamin, 12 Kleine Klavierstücke, Op. 143 (1915)
1. Larghetto, B♭ major
2. Con moto, E♭ major
3. Molto adagio, A major
4. Allegretto grazioso, E major
5. Agitato, B minor
6. Poco vivace, A♭ major
7. Molto sostenuto, D major
8. Vivace, C major
9. Larghetto, C minor
10. Vivace, D minor
11. Andantino, G minor
12. Larghetto, D major

== Details of sets of compositions with WoO number ==
- "Grüße an die Jugend" for piano (1898) WoO III/6
1. Fughette
2. Caprice fantastique
3. Abenddämmerung
4. Albumblatt
5. Scherzo
6. Humoresque

- Blätter und Blüten for piano (1900/1902) WoO III/12
1. Albumblatt
2. Humoresque
3. Frühlingslied
4. Elegie
5. Jagdstück
6. Melodie
7. Moment Musical No. 1
8. Moment Musical No. 2
9. Gigue
10. Romanze No. 1
11. Romanze No. 2
12. Scherzino

- Four "Spezialstudien" for piano left hand (1901) WoO III/13
1. Scherzo
2. Humoresque
3. Romanze
4. Prelude and Fugue

- Fünf ausgewählte Volkslieder für TTBB (1898) WoO VI/6
1. Herzweh (1817, Gotha, with an additional second stanza by Hermann Kurz)
2. Liebchens Bote (Flugblatt 1756)
3. Das Sternlein (Matthias Claudius)
4. Dianderl tief drunt im Thal (from Carinthia)
5. Ich hab' die Nacht geträumet

- Sechs ausgewählte Volkslieder für SATB (1899) WoO VI/10
1. Liebesschmerz (from Swabia)
2. Das Sternlein (Matthias Claudius)
3. Liebesqual (from Swabia)
4. Vergebens (from Franconia)
5. Liebchens Bote (Flugblatt 1756)
6. Das Mädchen vom Lande (Johann Wilhelm Ludwig Gleim)

- Acht ausgewählte Volkslieder. Neue Folge, für SATB (1899) WoO VI/11
1. Mailied (Friedrich Richter)
2. Ach, Bäumchen, du stehst grüne (überliefert by Karl Simrock
3. Liebesleid
4. Ich hab' die Nacht geträumet
5. Trutze nicht (from the Odenwald 1839)
6. Wie kommt's? (from Thuringia and Franconia)
7. Schwäbisches Tanzliedchen (Ländler from Upper Swabia)
8. Es waren zwei Königskinder

== Bibliography ==
- "Max Reger's works". Max-Reger-Institute / Elsa-Reger-Stiftung.
- Schröder, Heribert (1990). "Acht geistliche Gesänge / op. 138" (PDF). Carus-Verlag. pp. 5–6.
