= Eine romantische Suite =

Suite for orchestra by Max Reger

- Suite by Max Reger
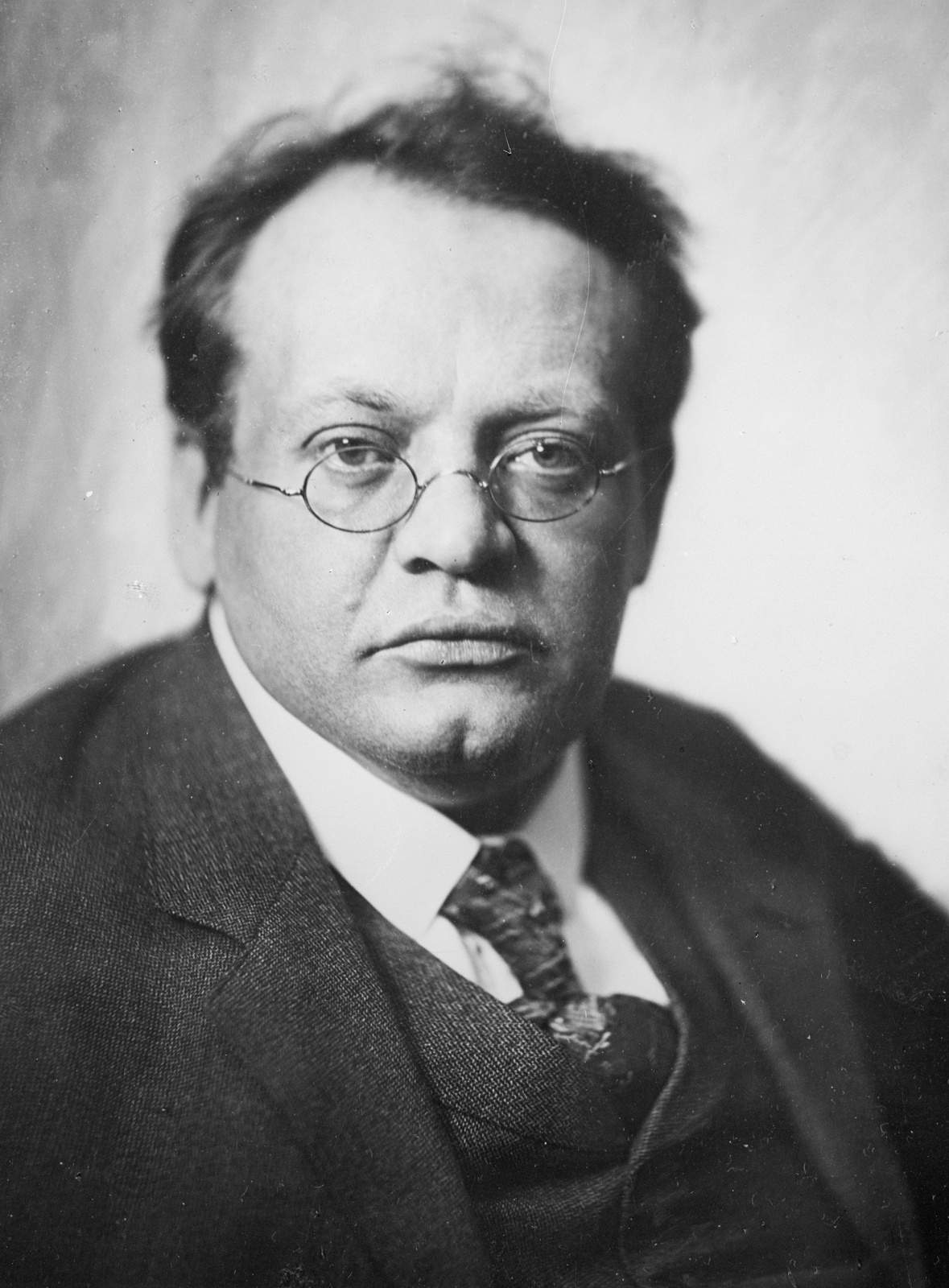
- The composer
- English: A Romantic Suite
- Opus: 125
- Based on: poems by Joseph von Eichendorff
- Dedication: Hugo Grüters
- Performed: 11 October 1912: Dresden
- Published: 1912
- Scoring: orchestra

Eine romantische Suite (A Romantic Suite), Op. 125, is a suite for orchestra by Max Reger, based on poems by Joseph von Eichendorff. Reger described this suite, composed and first performed in 1912, and the Vier Tondichtungen nach A. Böcklin, Op. 128, as "Ausflug in das Gebiet der Programmusik" (Excursion in the realm of program music).

== History ==
Reger composed the suite in Meiningen during May and June 1912. He was director of music of the Hofkapelle there from 1911 to 1914, and wrote most of his compositions for orchestra during this time. He dedicated the work to Hugo Grüters. During composition time, Reger already offered the premiere to Ernst von Schuch, who had successfully conducted the premiere of Der Rosenkavalier in 1911, and who had a passion for contemporary music. Schuch programmed works by Regers regularly from 1906 for the Königliche musikalische Kapelle (Royal Chapel) in Dresden, and had engaged Reger as the pianist for Bach's Brandenburg Concerto No. 5 in 1911. Reger dedicated his Lustspiel-Ouvertüre, Op. 120, to the conductor in return.

The score and parts of Eine romantische Suite were published by Bote & Bock in September 1912. The suite was first performed on 11 October 1912 in the first symphony concert of the Royal Chapel that season, conducted by Ernst von Schuch.

Arnold Schoenberg wrote in 1920 an arrangement of the suite for chamber ensemble. Reger's suite was published as part of his complete works in volume 4, orchestral works IV (Sämtliche Werke, Band 4: Orchesterwerke IV) by Breitkopf & Härtel in Wiesbaden in 1962.

== Structure and scoring ==
The suite is structured in three movements, with two slow movements framing a vivid scherzo.

1. Notturno (Molto sostenuto)
2. Scherzo (Vivace)
3. Finale (Molto sostenuto)

The three movements correspond to three poems by Joseph von Eichendorff, "Nachtzauber" (Night magic), "Elfe" (Fairy) and "Adler" (Eagle). While Reger originally wanted to name the movements as the poems, he thought about similar titles ("Mondnacht", "Elfentanz" and "Helios") but finally chose neutral titles.

Reger scored the work for a symphonic orchestra of three flutes, two oboes, cor Anglais, two clarinets, two bassoons, three trumpets, four horns, three trombones, tuba, harp, three timpani, cymbal and strings.

== Bibliography ==
- "Eine romantische Suite" (in German). Max-Reger-Institute / Elsa-Reger-Stiftung.
- "Kompositionen von Max Reger" (in German). koelnklavier.de. 1994.
- Niederschlag, Tobias (2013). "Max Reger: 'Eine romantische Suite' op. 125" (in German). rundfunkschaetze.de.
