= Op. 110 =

In music, Op. 110 stands for Opus number 110. Compositions that are assigned this number include:

- Beethoven – Piano Sonata No. 31
- Dvořák – The Wild Dove
- Mendelssohn – Piano Sextet
- Prokofiev – Waltz Suite
- Reger – Geistliche Gesänge, Op. 110
- Schumann – Piano Trio No. 3
- Shostakovich – String Quartet No. 8
- Sibelius – Väinämöinen's Song (Väinön virsi), cantata for mixed choir and orchestra (1926)
