= Vier Tondichtungen nach A. Böcklin =

1913 composition in four parts for orchestra by Max Reger

- Tone poems by Max Reger
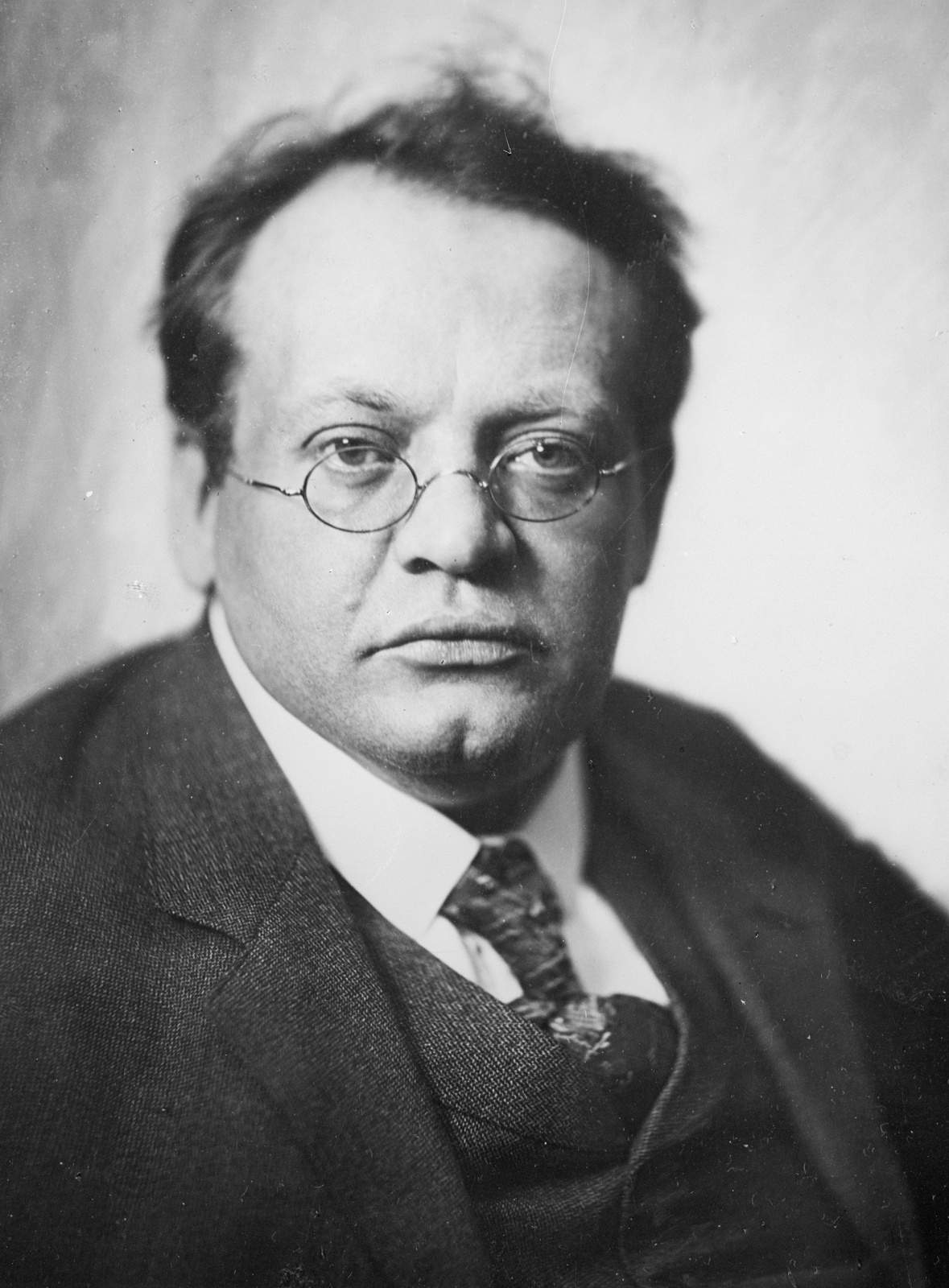
- Reger in 1913
- English: Four tone poems after Arnold Böcklin
- Opus: 128
- Based on: paintings by Arnold Böcklin
- Dedication: Julius Buths
- Performed: 12 October 1913: Essen
- Published: 1913

Vier Tondichtungen nach A. Böcklin (Four Tone Poems After Arnold Böcklin), Op. 128, is a composition in four parts for orchestra by Max Reger, based on four paintings by Arnold Böcklin, including Die Toteninsel (Isle of the Dead). He composed them in Meiningen in 1913.

== Background and history ==
While tone poems were a common genre around 1900, including many works by Richard Strauss, Reger typically wrote more abstract music. He described his Eine romantische Suite, Op. 125, and the tone poems after Böcklin as "Ausflug in das Gebiet der Programmusik" (Excursion in the realm of program music).

Reger composed the four tone poems in Meiningen from end of May to July 1913, after planning it from October 1912. He dedicated the work to Julius Buths. The score and parts were published by Bote & Bock in September 1913. Reger conducted the first performance in Essen on 12 October that year, with the Städtisches Orchester (municipal orchestra).

== Structure and scoring ==
The four parts are in contrasting tempo, slow–fast–slow–fast. Both slow movements, 1 and 3, are marked Molto sostenuto (aber nie schleppend) (but never dragging), both fast movements Vivace.

Structure of Reger's Vier Tondichtungen nach A. Böcklin
No.	Title	Translation	Marking
1	Der geigende Eremit	The hermit playing violin	Molto sosteuto
2	Im Spiel der Wellen	Playing in the waves	Vivace
3	Die Toteninsel	Isle of the Dead	Molto sostenuto
4	Bacchanal	Bacchanale	Vivace

The work is scored for a symphonic orchestra of three flutes (including (piccolo), two oboes (including Cor Anglais), two clarinets, two bassoons, contrabassoon, four horns, three trumpets, three trombones, tuba, harp, three timpani and more percussion, solo-violin, strings (divisi in I). The pieces can be played individually or as "a quasi-symphony".

=== 1. Der geigende Eremit ===
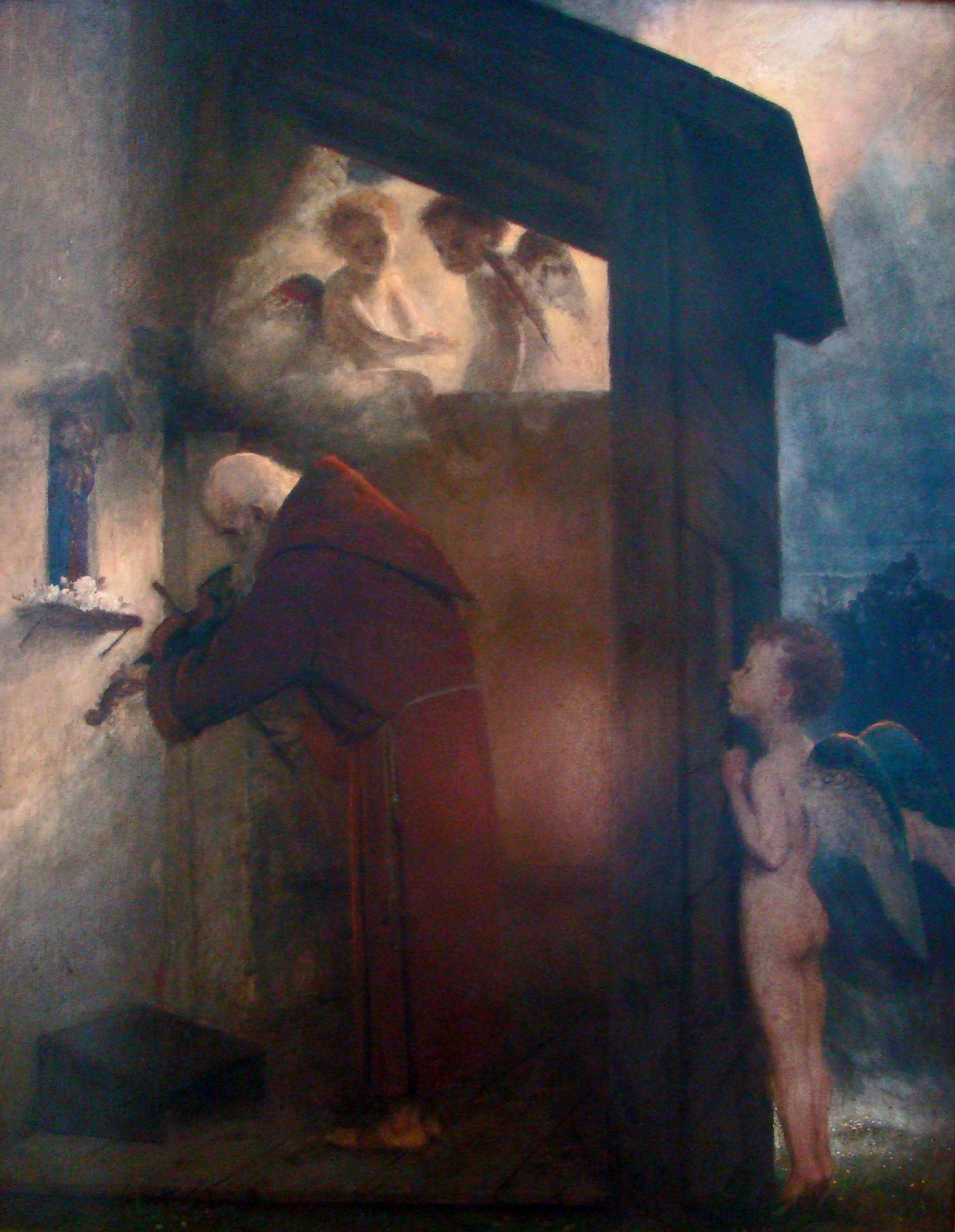
Der Einsiedler

Der geigende Eremit (The Hermit Fiddler, literally: The hermit playing violin) is based on a painting Der Einsiedler (The Hermit) that Böcklin made in Florence in 1884. A solo violin is contrasted by a group of strings playing con sordino and another group playing not muted. The "ethereal violin" has been compared to Ralph Vaughan Williams' The Lark Ascending, composed in 1914.

Klaus Uwe Ludwig wrote an arrangement of the movement for violin and organ, which was published by Breitkopf.

=== 2. Im Spiel der Wellen ===
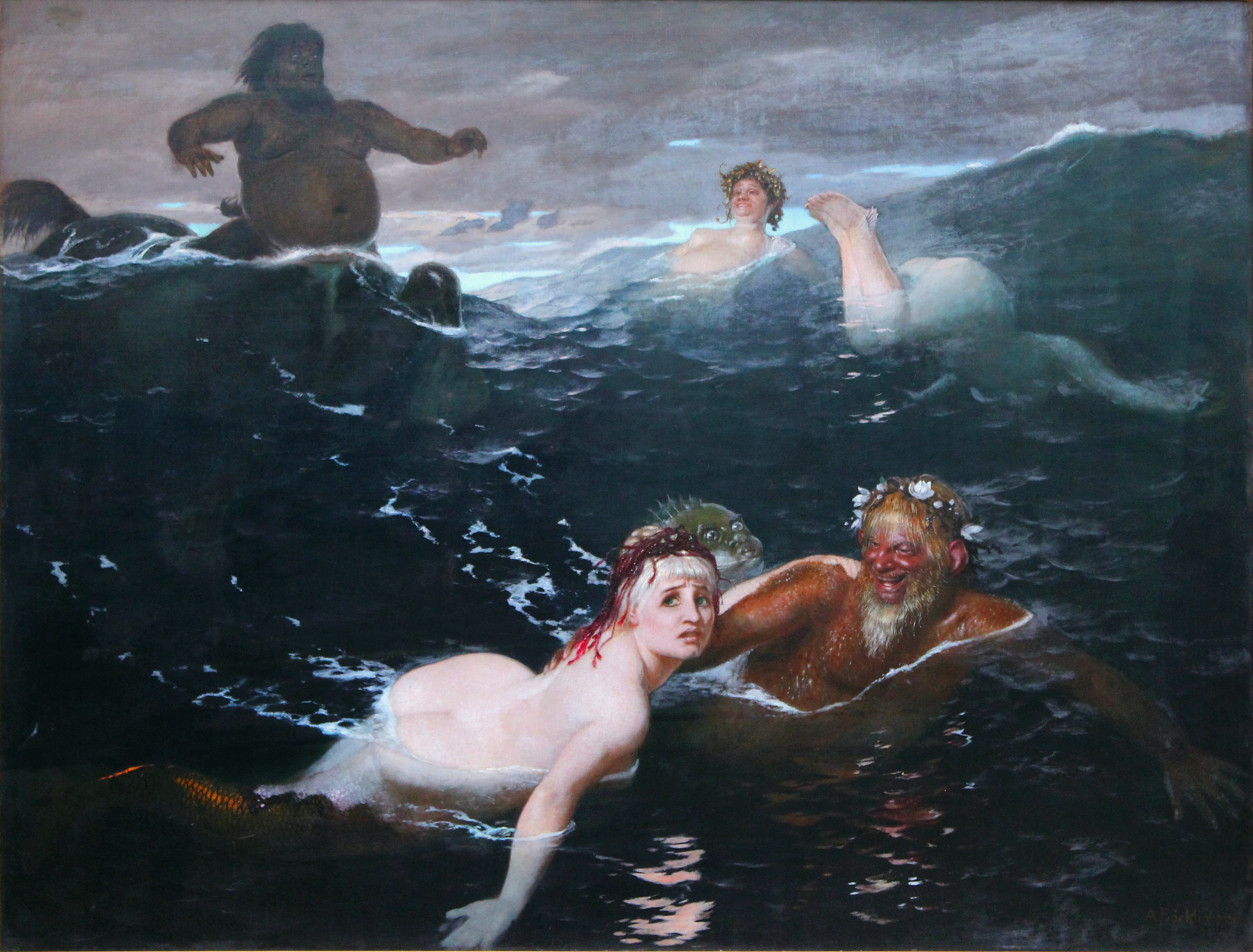
Playing in the Waves

Im Spiel der Wellen (literally: In the play of the waves) is based on a painting Im Spiel der Wellen (Playing in the Waves) that Böcklin made in 1883. Like the painting, the music evokes the shimmering foam of surf in sunlight, and the play of naiads and Triton. A reviewer compares the movement to Debussy's La mer written a few years earlier, noting that "Reger pursued the flamboyant realm of mythical creatures". Both works have a similar "sparkling orchestral character".

=== 3. Die Toteninsel ===
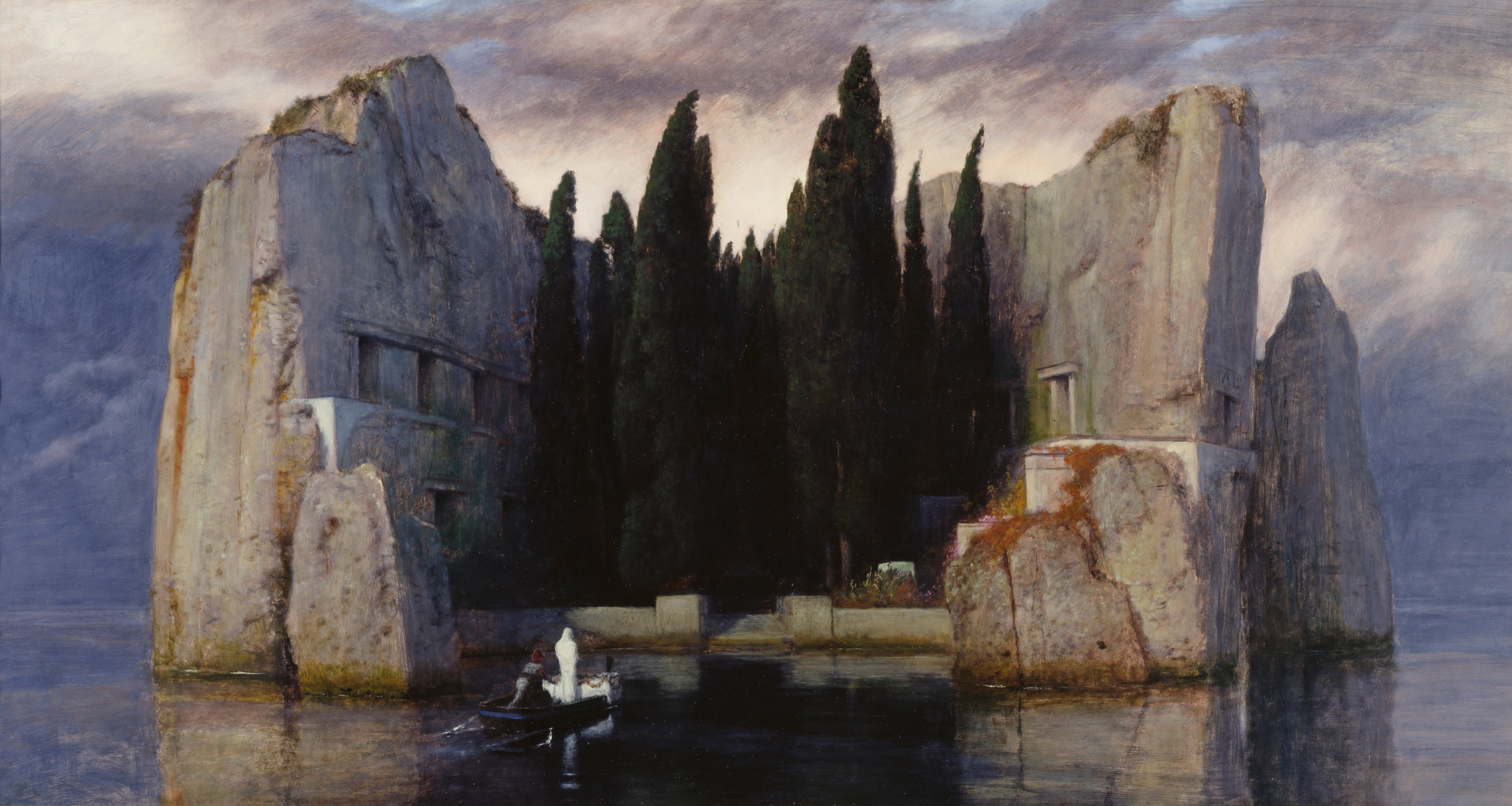
Isle of the Dead, 1883

Die Toteninsel (Isle of the Dead) is based on a painting of the same name that Böcklin made in five different versions between 1880 and 1886. The painting has been regarded Böcklin's most famous work, with a title not by Böcklin himself, but the art dealer Fritz Gurlitt. Thomas Mann characterized the painting as expressing Sympathie mit dem Tode (sympathy with death), typical for the fin de siècle. A composition based on the painting by Andreas Hallén appeared in 1897, others followed, including a piece of the same title by Serge Rachmaninoff in 1909. Reger writes "long-held but shifting sonorities", using the orchestra like an organ.

Max Beckschäfer arranged Reger's movement for organ in 1984. He played it first at the Marktkirche Wiesbaden in 1985, along with the organ part of his arrangement of Reger's Hebbel Requiem.

=== 4. Bacchanal ===
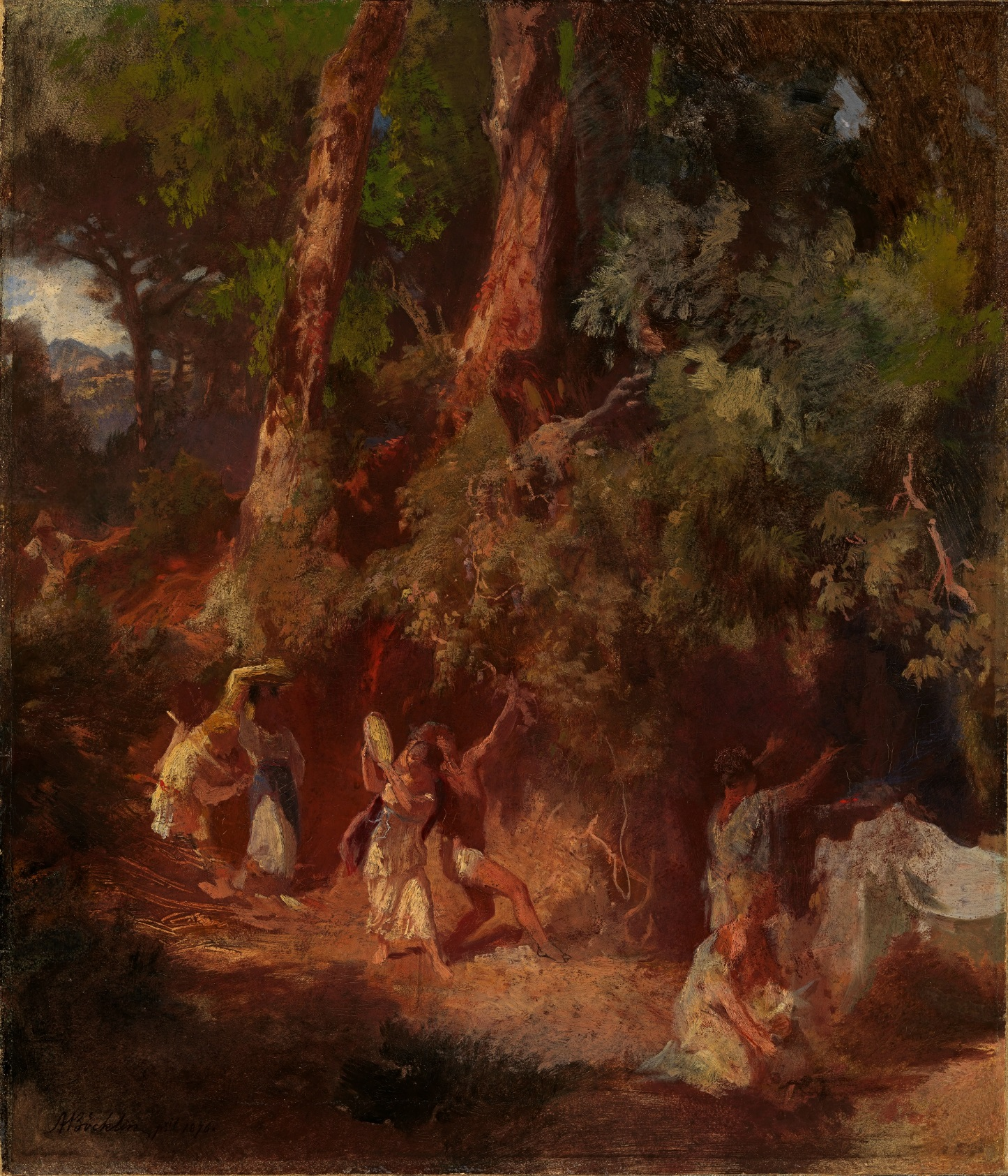
Bacchantenfest, c. 1856

Bacchanal is based on a painting Bacchantenfest (Feast of the Bacchants), painted around 1856. It may recall the "folly of earlier orgiastic times", or the longing of an older person to still be part of them. Reger, who called his own experience "Sturm und Trank" (storm and drink), as pun on "Sturm und Drang", used conterpoint, harmonic development and refined instrumentation to achieve a dazzling painting in sound.

== Later performance ==
The work was performed in the official opening concert of the Reger-Jahr (Reger year) 2016 in Leipzig, where Reger died in 1916, played by the orchestra of the Musikhochschule Leipzig.
