= Die Nonnen =

- Choral composition by Max Reger
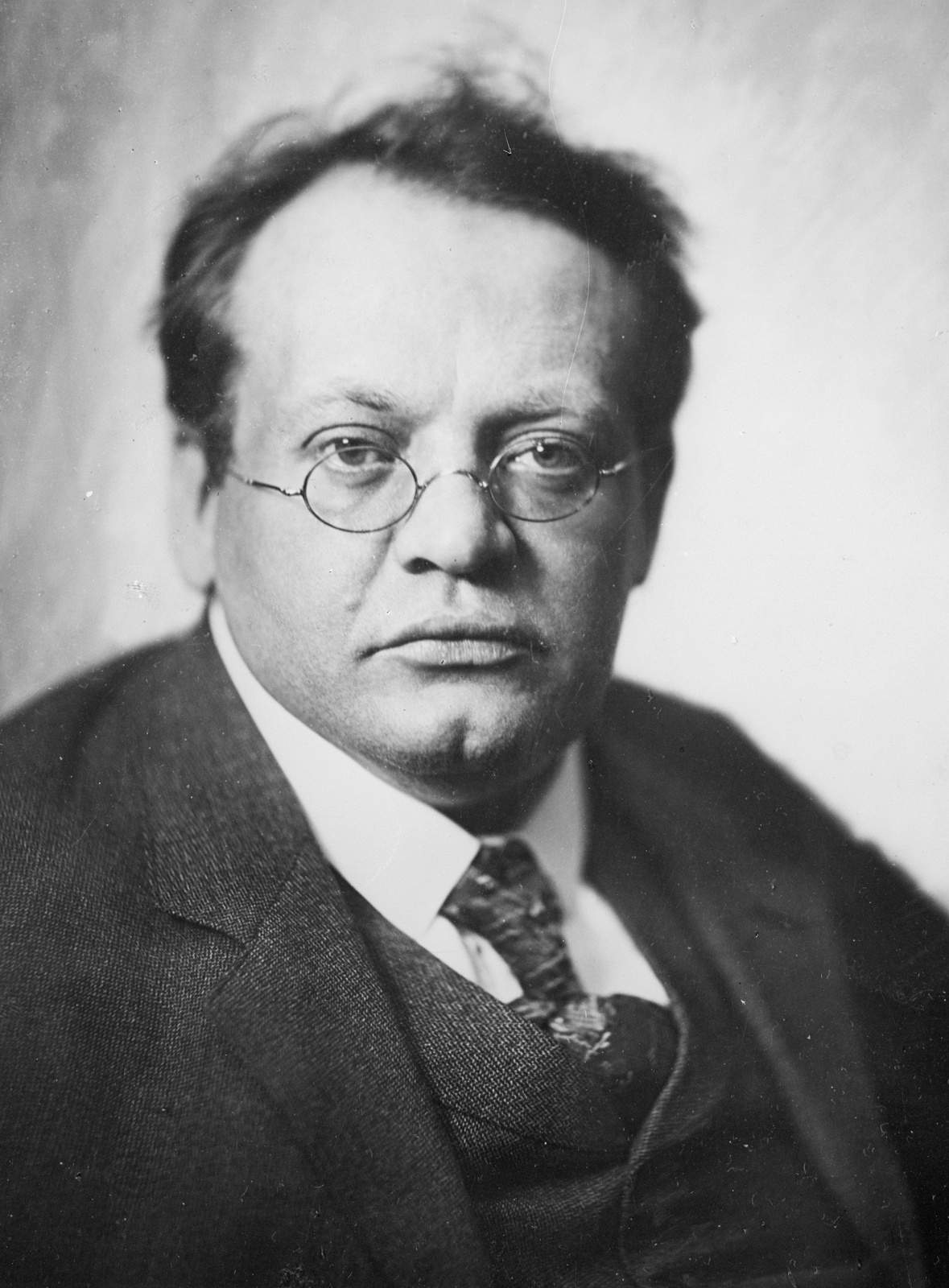
- The composer in 1913
- English: The Nuns
- Opus: 112
- Language: German
- Composed: 1909
- Dedication: Philipp Wolfrum
- Performed: 8 May 1910: Dortmund
- Scoring: choir; orchestra

Die Nonnen (The Nuns), Op. 112, is a composition for mixed choir and orchestra by Max Reger, written in 1909. The text is a poem by Martin Boelitz.

== History ==
Reger completed Die Nonnen in 1909. It is a setting of a poem in three stanzas by Martin Boelitz. The work was first performed on 8 May 1910 in Dortmund as part of a Reger Festival there, by the Musik-Verein choir and the Städtisches Orchester Dortmund, conducted by Julius Janssen. It was first published by Bote & Bock in Berlin in 1910, with a dedication to Philipp Wolfrum. It was published again in 1967 as part of Reger's complete works by Breitkopf & Härtel.

== Recordings ==
Die Nonnen was recorded in 1995 by the Bamberger Symphoniker and Chor, conducted by Horst Stein, and in 1982, together with Reger's Romantische Suite, by the NDR Chor and the Saarbrücken Radio Symphony Orchestra conducted by Hans Zender.

== Cited sources ==
- "Reger, Max / Die Nonnen (The Nuns) Op. 112". Musikproduktion Höflich. 2021.
- "Reer, Die Nonnen, Op. 112". prestomusic.com. 2021.
- "Die Nonnen Op. 112" (in German). 2021.
