= Ein' feste Burg ist unser Gott (Reger) =

- Chorale fantasia by Max Reger
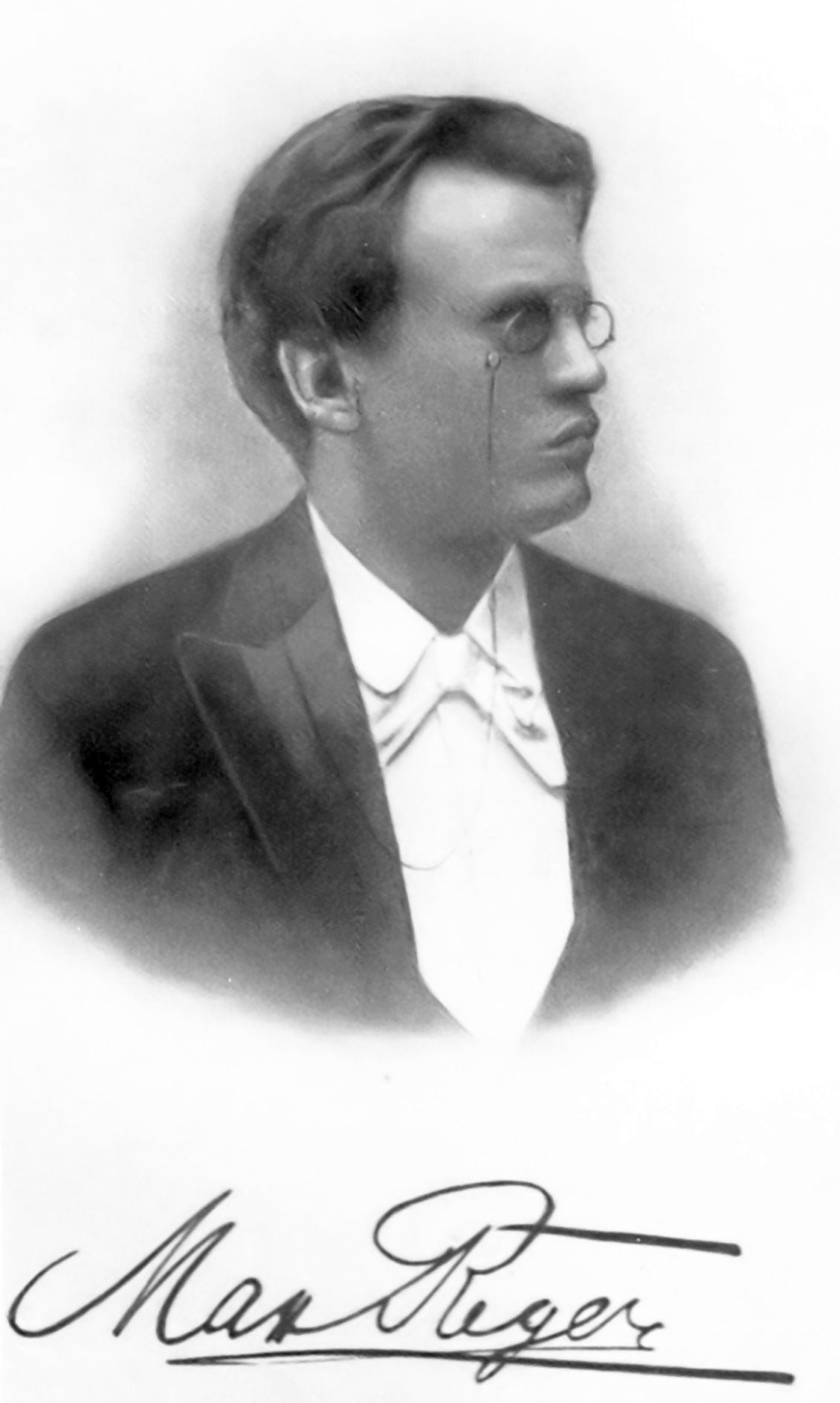
- Reger in 1901
- Opus: 27
- Based on: Hymn "Ein feste Burg ist unser Gott"
- Composed: 1898
- Dedication: Karl Straube
- Published: 1899

Ein' feste Burg ist unser Gott ("A Mighty Fortress Is Our God"), Op. 27, is a chorale fantasia for organ by Max Reger. He composed it in 1898 on Luther's hymn "Ein feste Burg ist unser Gott". The full title is Phantasie über den Choral "Ein' feste Burg ist unser Gott".

== Background ==
Reger was raised Catholic but was fascinated by the variety of melodies of Protestant hymns, and used quotations from them throughout his life. He composed seven chorale fantasias in Weiden between 1898 and 1900, inspired by a fantasia on "Wie schön leuchtet der Morgenstern", Op. 25 (1895) of his teacher Heinrich Reimann. Reger's fantasias follow Reimann's model of setting individual stanzas, connected by interludes. Reger wrote the works for Karl Straube, whom he met in April 1898 when he played concerts at the Frankfurt Paulskirche, including parts of Reger's Suite for organ, Op. 16. Straube believed in Reger as a composer and premiered several of his works from manuscript.

The text of the hymn was written by Martin Luther, published in 1529. Reger composed the fantasia in Weiden in August and September 1898, and dedicated it to Karl Straube, who played the first performance in Wesel on 20 September 1898. It was the first work written for Straube, and the first work by Reger to find success with the public, regarded as his breakthrough as a composer.

The fantasia was published by Rob. Forberg in Leipzig in March 1899. Reger had planned it as his Op. 27a, with Op. 27b a fantasia on "Freu’ dich sehr, o meine Seele". The second work was published by Jos. Aibl Verlag as Op. 30. Ein' feste Burg ist unser Gott, as other chorale fantasias by Reger, is more often performed in concert than in liturgical church services, because of its dimensions. Reger commented the alleged difficulty of his organ works in 1900 to his friend the organist Gusav Beckmann: "Meine Orgelsachen sind schwer, es gehört ein über die Technik souverän herrschender geistvoller Spieler dazu" (My organ pieces are difficult; they need a skillful player who masters the technique). The organist Alfred Sittard first recorded this work on shellac phonograph records in 1908 on the Sauer organ of the Garrison Church, Berlin.

== Bibliography ==
- Greenbank, Stephen (2016). Max Reger (1873–1916) / Chorale Fantasies. musicweb-international.com.
- Szabó, Balázs (2016). Zur Orgelmusik Max Regers (PDF). Studien zur Orgelmusik (in German). Vol. 5. Bonn: Dr. J. Butz. p. 19.
- "Phantasie über den Choral "Ein' feste Burg ist unser Gott" Op. 27"". Max-Reger-Institute. 2016.
- "Band I/1 Choralphantasien". Max-Reger-Institute. 2016. Archived from the original on 5 December 2018.
- Max Reger – Das Geistliche Lied als Orgellied – eine Gattung entsteht (PDF) (in German). qucosa.de. Archived from the original (PDF) on 28 March 2016.
- "Keine Note zuviel! / Ökumenische Trierer Veranstaltungsreihe zum 100. Todesjahr von Max Reger" (PDF) (in German). trierer-orgelpunkt.de. Archived from the original (PDF) on 19 October 2016.
- "Max Reger / 1898 Rückkehr nach Weiden" (in German). max-reger-orgel.de.
