= Zwölf Stücke, Op. 80 =

1902–1904 compositions for organ by Max Reger

Zwölf Stücke
- Organ pieces by Max Reger
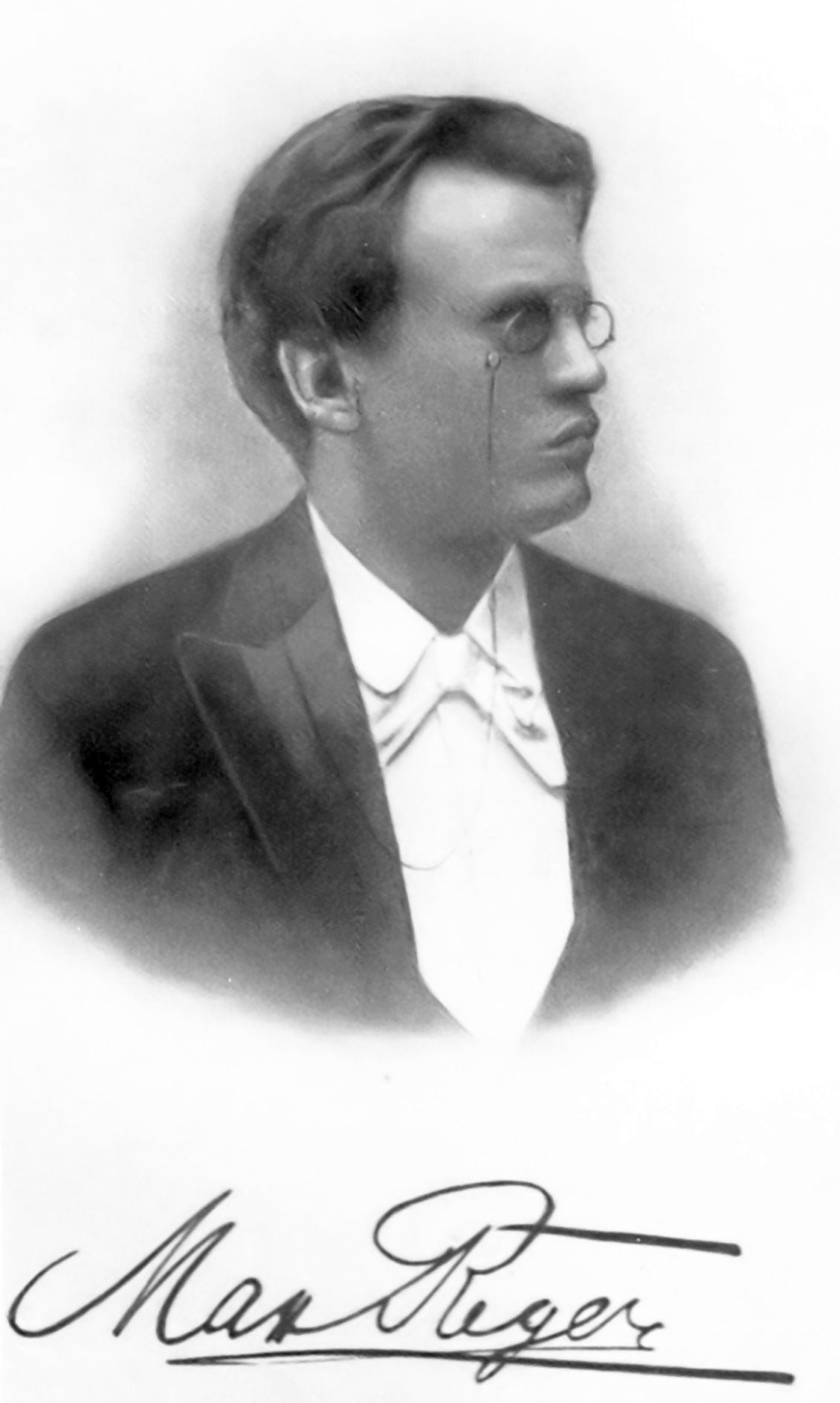
- Reger in 1901
- Opus: 80
- Composed: 1902, 1904
- Dedication: Paul Homeyer; Joseph Vockner
- Published: 1904

Zwölf Stücke, Op. 80, is a group of twelve pieces for organ by Max Reger. He composed them in Munich in 1902 and 1904. They were published by C. F. Peters in Leipzig in September 1904.

== History and movements ==
The pieces are character pieces of medium difficulty, as a contrast to his major organ works. Reger had written such works already as a student in Wiesbaden. He turned to the organ in Weiden. On a request of the publisher Henri Hinrichsen of C. F. Peters, Reger composed 15 pieces in Munich in 1902. Peters published twelve in Leipzig in August 1902 as Zwölf Stücke, Op. 65. Reger used the three still unpublished pieces (Fughette, Gigue, Intermezzo) and composed additional nine pieces in 1904, to form a similar set of works that can be played in sequence or individually. In Reger's lifetime, performers often combined movements from different collections.

The twelve pieces were published by C. F. Peters in Leipzig in September 1904, in two books (Heft) of six pieces each. Reger dedicated the pieces of Heft 1 to Franz Grunicke, an organist in Berlin, and those of Heft 2 to Otto Burkert.

The titles and keys are:

1. Präludium, E minor
2. Fughette, E minor
3. Canzonetta, G minor
4. Gigue, D minor
5. Ave Maria, D♭ major
6. Intermezzo, G minor
7. Scherzo, F♯ minor
8. Romanze, A minor
9. Perpetuum mobile, F minor
10. Intermezzo, D major
11. Toccata, A minor
12. Fuge, A minor

In the edition of Reger's complete works by the Max-Reger-Institute, they were published in volumes 5–7.

== Recordings ==
The organist Hans-Jürgen Kaiser recorded ten of the twelve pieces in volume 11 of the complete organ works by Reger, along with the Chorale Preludes, Op. 79b, played on the Rieger-Sauer organ in the Fulda Cathedral, while numbers 7 and 8 were played by Martin Wetzel on the Klais organ of the Trier Cathedral and appear on volume 8.

== Sources ==
- Popp, Susanne; Seehof, Thomas, eds. (2016). "Werkausgabe / Abteilung I Orgelwerke / Band 6 Orgelstücke II" (PDF) (in German). Carus-Verlag.
- "Zwölf Stücke Op. 80 / für Orgel". Max-Reger-Institute. 2016.
- "Volume I/5–7 Organ pieces". Max-Reger-Institute. 2016. Archived from the original on 5 December 2018.
- "Reger, M.: Organ Works, Vol. 8 – Chorale Fantasia on Ein' feste Burg ist unser Gott / Little Chorale Preludes, Nos. 11–30 (Welzel)". Naxos Records. 2016.
- "Reger, M.: Organ Works, Vol. 11 – Chorale Preludes, Op. 79b / 12 Pieces, Op. 80: Nos. 1–6 and 9–12 (H.-J. Kaiser)". Naxos Records. 2016.
