= Zwölf Stücke, Op. 65 =

1902 compositions for organ by Max Reger

Zwölf Stücke
- Organ pieces by Max Reger
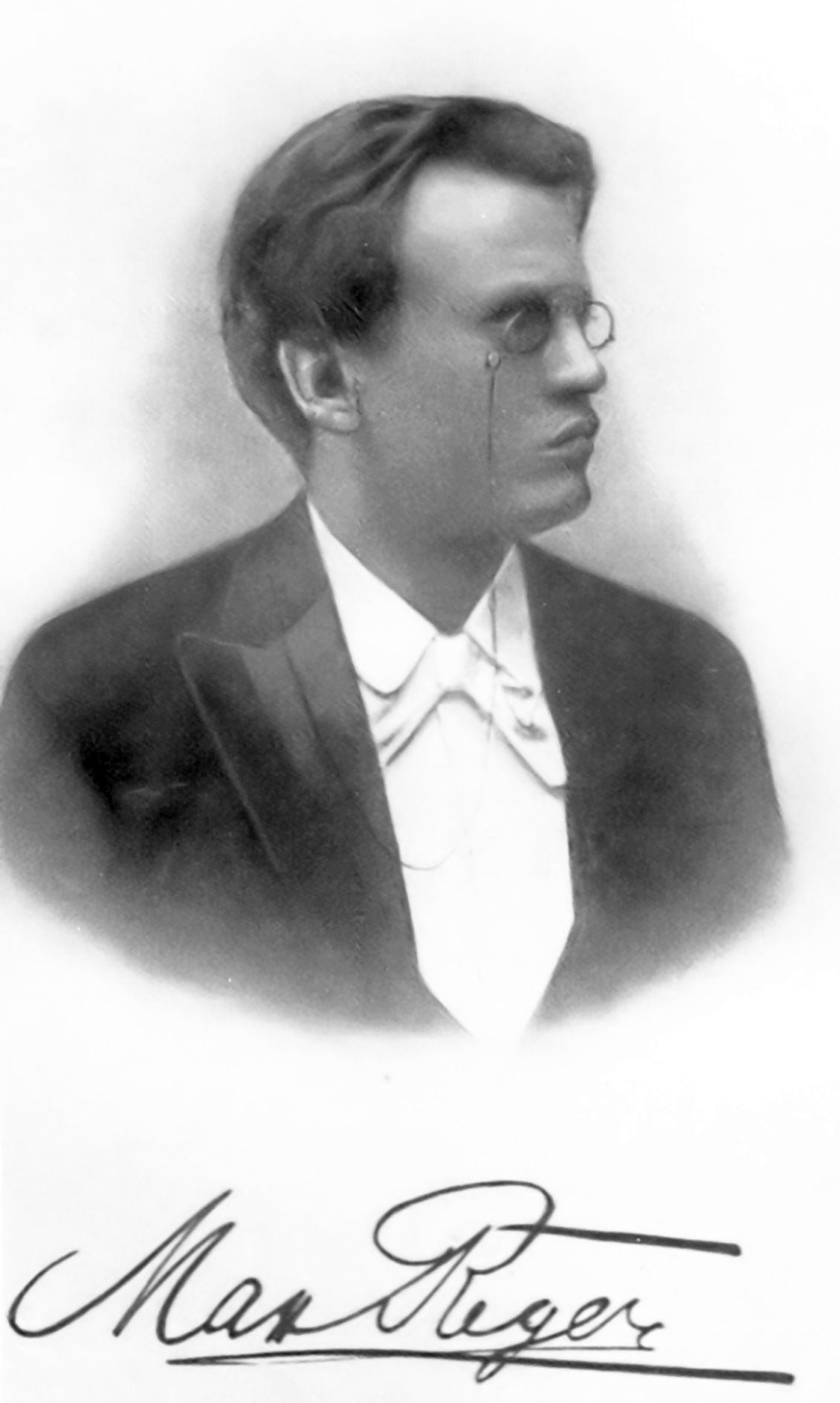
- Reger in 1901
- Opus: 65
- Composed: 1902
- Dedication: Paul Homeyer; Joseph Vockner
- Published: 1902

Zwölf Stücke, Op. 65, is a group of twelve pieces for organ by Max Reger, composed in Munich in 1902. They were published by C. F. Peters in Leipzig in August of that year, in two books (Heft) of six pieces each.

== History ==
The pieces are character pieces of medium difficulty, as a contrast to his major organ works. Reger had written such works already as a student in Wiesbaden. He turned to the organ in Weiden. On 31 December 1901, Reger approached the publisher Henri Hinrichsen of C. F. Peters to find out if he was ready to print in 1902 piano works, songs or chamber music. Henri answered that would prefer organ works easy to play ("leichte Spielbarkeit"). Reger composed 15 pieces in Munich in 1902, but Peters published twelve in Leipzig in August 1902, in two books (Heft) of six pieces each. The three unpublished pieces were used for the collection Zwölf Stücke, Op. 80 in 1904.

Reger dedicated the pieces of Heft 1 to Paul Homeyer, the organist at the Gewandhaus in Leipzig, and those of Heft 2 to Joseph Vockner, a pupil of Anton Bruckner and teacher at the Vienna Conservatory. Both dedicatees were established organists of an older generation, but could not be won to promote Reger's music.

A reviewer of the first print wrote in the Monthly Musical Record: "The great art of expressing thoughts simply – in other words, concealing the art – is not to be found here; the composer is still in his storm and stress period.".

The pieces have been performed individually or in sequence. In Reger's lifetime, performers often combined movements from different collections. Reger himself played Canzone for the Welte Philharmonic Organ. In the edition of Reger's complete works by the Max-Reger-Institute, they were published in volume 6.

== Structure ==
The titles and keys are:

1. Rhapsodie, C♯ minor
2. Capriccio, G major
3. Pastorale, A major
4. Consolation
5. Improvisation, A minor
6. Fuge, A minor
7. Präludium, D minor
8. Fuge, D major
9. Canzone, E♭ major
10. Scherzo, D minor
11. Toccata, E minor
12. Fuge, E major
