= Geistliche Gesänge, Op. 110 =

Geistliche Gesänge
- Motets by Max Reger
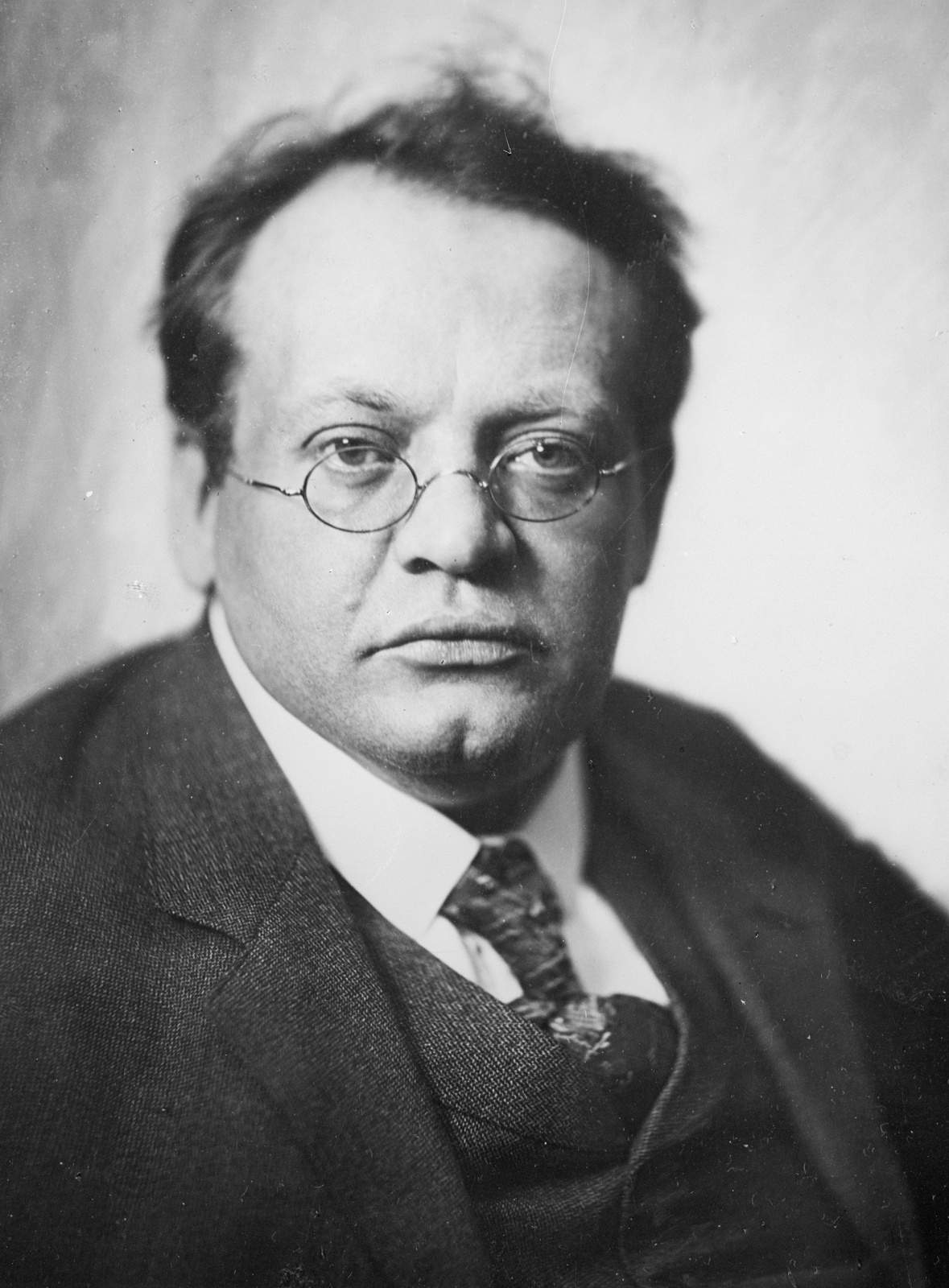
- The composer
- English: Sacred Songs
- Opus: 110
- Language: German
- Composed: 1909–12

Geistliche Gesänge (Sacred songs), Op. 110, are three motets by Max Reger. He composed them between 1909 and 1912:

1. Mein Odem ist schwach (My spirit is weak), 1909
2. Ach Herr, strafe mich nicht! (O Lord, chasten me not), 1910
3. O Tod, wie bitter bist du (O death, how bitter are you), 1912

The first moted is based on the Book of Job, the second on the Psalms, and the third on Sirach (Ecclesiasticus).

== Pieces ==
=== 1. Mein Odem ist schwach ===
Reger composed the first motet for an eight-part choir (SSAATTBB) in Meiningen in July 1909. He dedicated it "Dem Thomanerchor und seinem Dirigenten Gustav Schreck" (To the Thomanerchor and its conductor Gustav Schreck). The text is taken from the Book of Job ( Job 17:1–3, 26:2–3, 19:25). The score and parts were printed in September that year by Bote & Bock in Berlin, including a translation to English by Mrs. Bertram Shapleigh. The motet was first performed on 13 November 1909 by the Thomanerchor, conducted by Kurt Kranz.

=== 2. Ach, Herr, strafe mich nicht ===
Reger composed the second motet for an eight-part choir (SSAATTBB) in Leipzig and Tegernsee in July and August 1911. His dedication reads "Der Musikalischen Gesellschaft in Dortmund und ihrem Dirigenten Carl Holtschneider" (To the Musical Association in Dortmund and their conductor Carl Holtschneider). The text is taken from the Psalms. The score and parts were printed in October that year by Bote & Bock. The motet was first performed on 13 December 1913 in Aachen by the Städtischer Gesangverein (Municipal Singing Association), conducted by Fritz Busch.

=== 3. O Tod, wie bitter bist du ===
Reger composed the third motet for a five-part choir (SSATB) in Leipzig in July 1912. The text is taken from the Book of Sirach (Ecclesiasticus). Reger dedicated the work to Lili Wach. The score and parts were printed in October that year by Bote & Bock in Berlin, supplying also an anonymous translation to English. The motet was first performed on 10 November 1912 by the church choir of St. Lukas in Chemnitz, conducted by Georg Stolz.

== Bibliography ==
- Quinn, John (2005). "Max Reger (1873-1916) / O Tod, wie bitter bist du".
- "Motette "Mein Odem ist schwach" Op. 110 Nr. 1". 2016.
- "Motette "Ach, Herr, strafe mich nicht" Op. 110 Nr. 2". 2016.
- "Motette "O Tod, wie bitter bist du" Op. 110 Nr. 3". 2016.
- "Three motets, Op. 110". Carus-Verlag.
