= Hugo Grüters =

German conductor

Hugo Grüters (8 October 1851 in Uerdingen – 19 August 1928 in Leukerbad) was a German conductor.

== Life and career ==
Grüters was born on 8 October 1851 in Uerdingen, Kingdom of Prussia. His father was an organist and choirmaster and the first teacher of his son. In 1867 Grüters began to study at the Cologne Conservatory with Isidor Seiss (piano), Otto von Königslöw (violin), Franz Weber (organ), Friedrich Gernsheim and Ernst Rudorff (counterpoint) and Ferdinand Hiller (composition).

In 1884 Grüters started as Royal Director of Music in Duisburg and fourteen years later he became Music Director in Bonn. There he was responsible for the Beethoven Festival, the Handel Festival 1900, and the Schumann Festival.

The famous violinist Joseph Joachim was his friend and Adolf Busch his most famous composition student.

== Literature ==
- The British musicologist Tully Potter wrote a short biography of Grüters in his book about Adolf Busch. Tully Potter, Adolf Busch. The Life of an honest musician, Vol.2, Tocatta Press: London 2010, p. 1098-1099.
