= Anna Ritter =

German poet and writer (1865–1921)

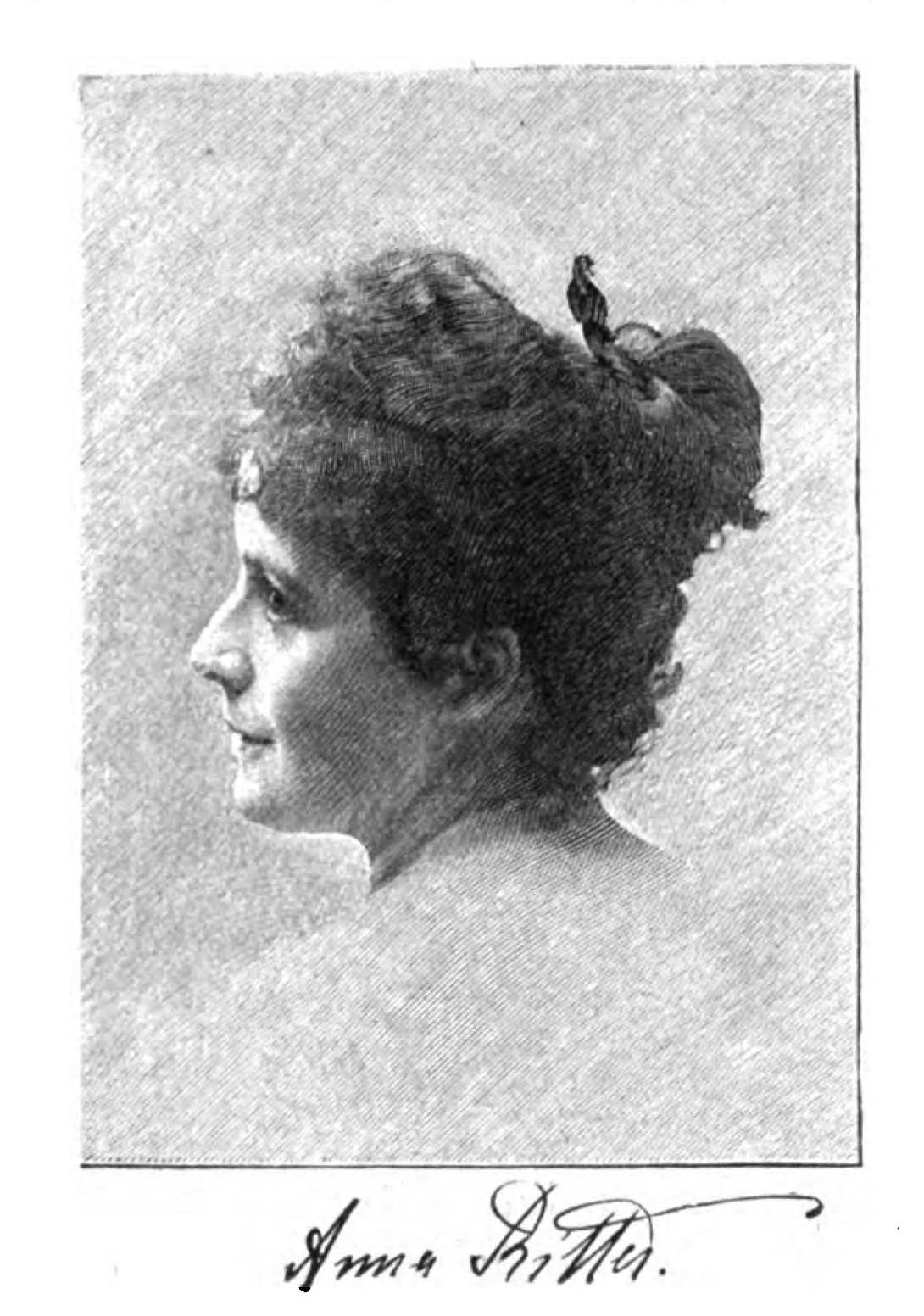
Anna Ritter (1899).

Anna Ritter (February 23, 1865 – October 31, 1921) was a German poet and writer.

== Biography ==
Ritter was born Anna Nuhn in Coburg, Saxe-Coburg and Gotha on February 23, 1865, but she was only a young child when her father, an export trader, moved the family to New York City. The young Anna returned to Europe in 1869 to attend boarding schools in Kassel and at a Moravian boarding school in the hamlet of Montmirail in the French-speaking canton of Neuchâtel, Switzerland. She completed her education in Kassel where she married a future civil servant, Rudolf Ritter in 1884.

The couple moved first to Cologne and later to Berlin and Münster. Her husband died in 1893, and the widow moved to the spa town of Bad Frankenhausen in Thuringia. She published her first collection of poetry in 1898 and a second collection followed in 1900. In that same year she found employment with the weekly journal, Die Gartenlaube, which had previously published her poetry. She published a novel, Margharita in 1902 followed by a travel diary. Her most famous poem is "Denkt euch, ich habe das Christkind geseh'n" (I think I saw the Christ Child).

She belonged to a group of writers commissioned by Cologne-based Ludwig Stollwerck chocolate producers to produce literature for a series of collectable print albums and scrapbooks. Other authors included the poet "T. Resa," (Gröhe Theresa), zoologist Paul Matschie, Hans Eschelbach, journalist Julius Rodenburg, writer Joseph von Lauff, poet Carl Hermann Busse, and the novelist Gustav Falke, among others.

Ritter died on October 31, 1921, in Marburg.

Ritters style is lyric, and it aligns with lyric styles of several turn of the century German poets – saturated with symbolism and influenced by folklore and a New Romanticism. Composers to set her poems to music include Max Reger, Jean Sibelius, and Kurt Weill, among others.

== Selected works ==
- Gedichte, Stuttgart (1898), Berlin: Cotta (27-29 printing) 1911.
- Befreiung: Neue Gedichte, Stuttgart: Cotta (fourth printing) 1900.
