= Bote & Bock =

German publisher

Bote & Bock is a German publishing house founded in Berlin in 1838 by Eduard Bote and Gustav Bock (1813-1863).

The first Gustav Bock was a musically gifted publisher with an eye for opera. Eduard Bote withdrew from the business in 1847, after the firm was run by Gustav Bock alone till his death in 1863. Bock's brother Emil Bock (1816-1871) then picked up the firm till his own death seven years later. Gustav's son Hugo Bock (1848-1932) had only been 15 when his father died, and upon the death of his uncle he found himself running the company at the age of 23. It was Hugo Bock who built the company's international reputation, to whom a son Gustav Bock was also born in 1882. Following Hugo Bock's death in 1932, the business was taken over by Robert Lienau in 1935 but the name Bote & Bock retained.

Boosey & Hawkes acquired the company in 1996.
