= Requiem (Reger) =

1915 late Romantic composition of Max Reger

- Choral composition by Max Reger
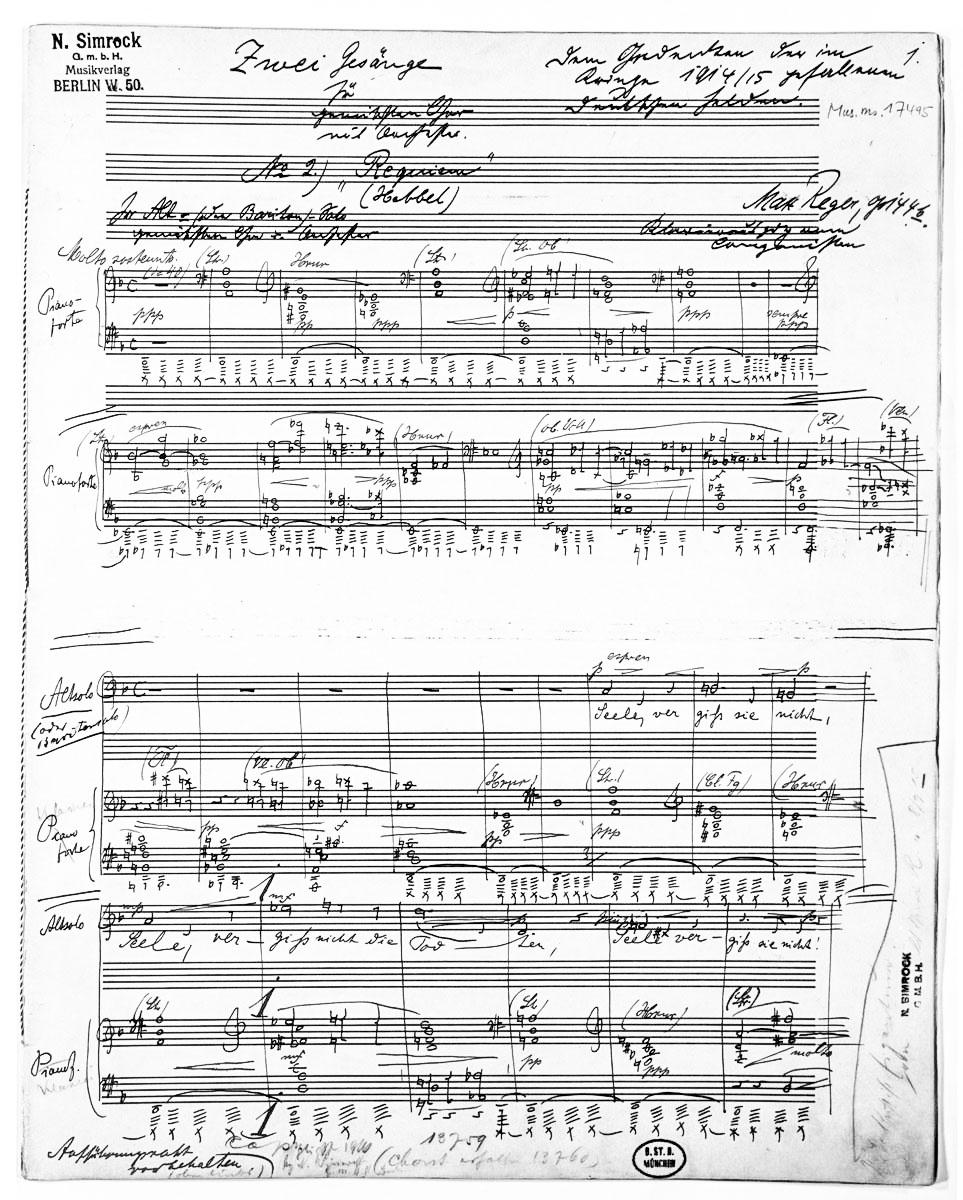
- First page from the autograph of the piano version of the Requiem, with title and dedication
- Key: D minor
- Opus: 144b
- Text: "Requiem" by Friedrich Hebbel
- Language: German
- Composed: 1915
- Dedication: Soldiers who fell in the War
- Performed: 16 July 1916
- Published: 1916: by N. Simrock
- Scoring: alto or baritone solo; chorus; orchestra

Max Reger's 1915 Requiem (or the Hebbel Requiem), Op. 144b, is a late Romantic setting of Friedrich Hebbel's poem "Requiem" for alto or baritone solo, chorus and orchestra. It is Reger's last completed work for chorus and orchestra, dedicated in the autograph as Dem Andenken der im Kriege 1914/15 gefallenen deutschen Helden (To the memory of the German heroes who fell in the 1914/15 War).

Reger had composed Requiem settings before: his 1912 motet for male chorus, published as the final part of his Op. 83, uses the same poem, and in 1914 he set out to compose a choral work in memory of the victims of the Great War. The setting is of the Latin Requiem, the Catholic service for the dead, but the work remained a fragment and was eventually designated the Lateinisches Requiem (Latin Requiem), Op. 145a.

The Hebbel Requiem was published by N. Simrock in 1916, after the composer's death, with another choral composition, Der Einsiedler (The Hermit), Op. 144a, to a poem by Joseph von Eichendorff. That publication was titled Zwei Gesänge für gemischten Chor mit Orchester (Two songs for mixed chorus with orchestra), Op. 144. Reger provided a piano transcription of the orchestral parts. Max Beckschäfer arranged the work for voice, chorus and organ in 1985. The Hebbel Requiem was first performed in Heidelberg on 16 July 1916 as part of a memorial concert for Reger, conducted by Philipp Wolfrum.

Reger thought the Hebbel Requiem was "among the most beautiful things" he ever wrote. It has been described as of "lyrical beauty, a dramatic compactness, and [of] economy of musical means" in which the composer's "mastery of impulse, technique, and material is apparent".

== Background ==
Reger was a German composer, born in Brand in 1873 and raised in Weiden in der Oberpfalz. He studied music theory from April to July 1890 with Hugo Riemann at the royal conservatory in Sondershausen and continued his studies, in piano and theory, at the Wiesbaden Conservatory beginning in September of that year. He established himself as a keyboard composer, performer, and teacher of piano and organ. The first compositions to which he assigned opus numbers were chamber music. In 1891 he composed his Sechs Lieder, Op. 4, a collection of six songs. The first, "Gebet" (Prayer), was on a text by Friedrich Hebbel, who also wrote the poem on which two of Reger's Requiem settings are based.

Reger returned to his parental home in 1898, where he composed his first work for choir and orchestra, Hymne an den Gesang (Hymn to song), Op. 21. He moved to Munich in 1901. Income from publishers, concerts and private teaching enabled him to marry in 1902. His wife, Elsa von Bercken, was a divorced Protestant, and as a result he was excommunicated from the Catholic Church. In 1907 he was appointed musical director at Leipzig University and professor at the Royal Conservatory in Leipzig.

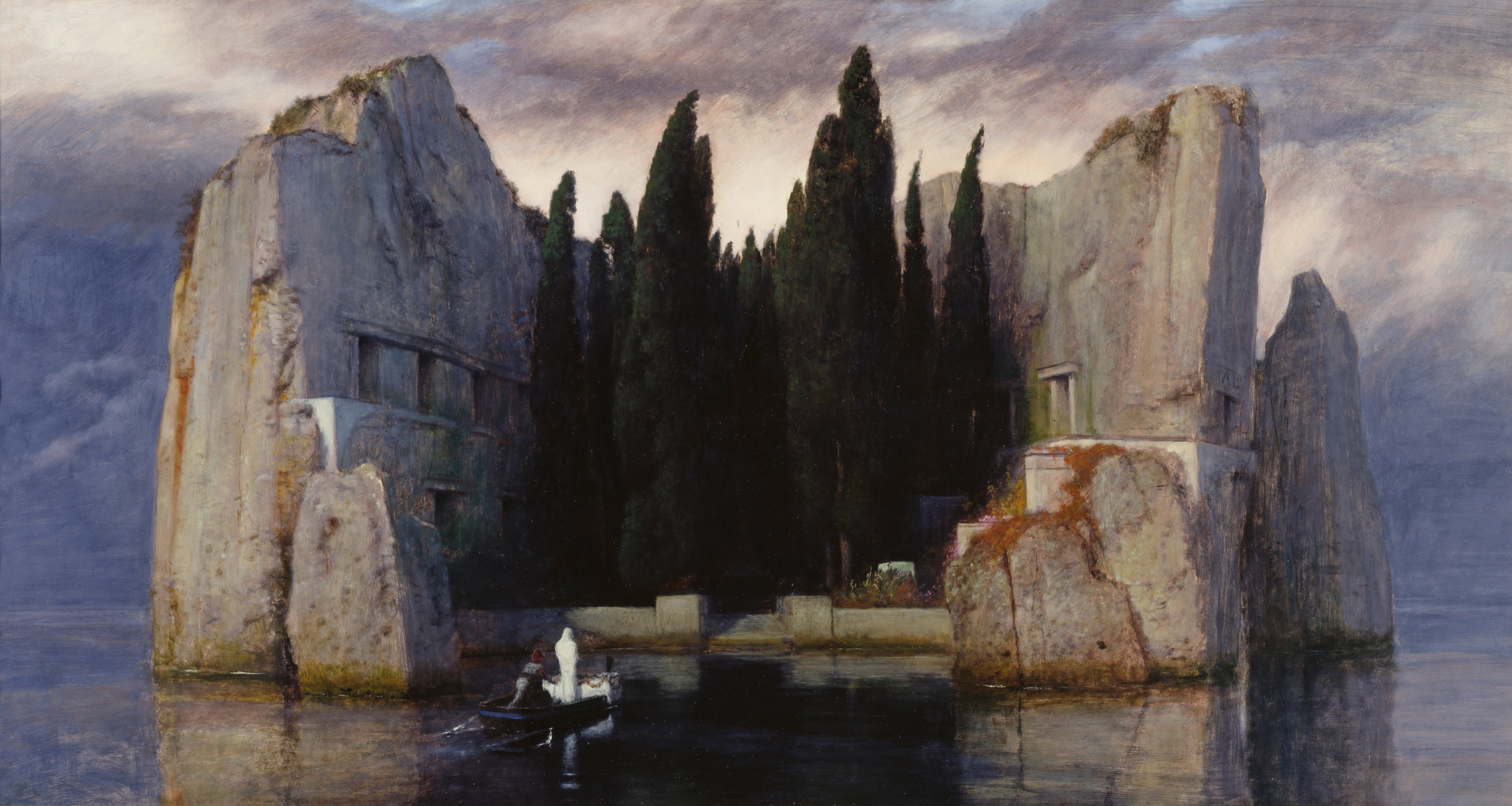
Isle of the Dead by Arnold Böcklin

In 1911 Reger was appointed Hofkapellmeister (music director) at the court of Duke Georg II of Saxe-Meiningen, while retaining his professorial duties at the Leipzig conservatory. In 1912 he set Hebbel's poem "Requiem" as a motet for unaccompanied male choir, which was published as No. 10 of his collection Op. 83. In 1913 he composed four tone poems on paintings by Arnold Böcklin (Vier Tondichtungen nach A. Böcklin), including the painting Die Toteninsel (Isle of the Dead), as his Op. 128. He gave up the court position in 1914 for health reasons. That year, in response to the World War, he set out to compose a choral work to commemorate the soldiers who had died or were mortally wounded. He began to set the Latin Requiem but abandoned the work as a fragment. In 1915 he moved to Jena but continued teaching in Leipzig. In Jena, he composed the Hebbel Requiem for soloist, choir and orchestra, Op. 144b, again on Hebbel's poem, as in the setting for men's chorus. Following a full day of teaching in Leipzig, Reger died of a heart attack while staying at a hotel there on 11 May 1916.

== Hebbel's poem ==
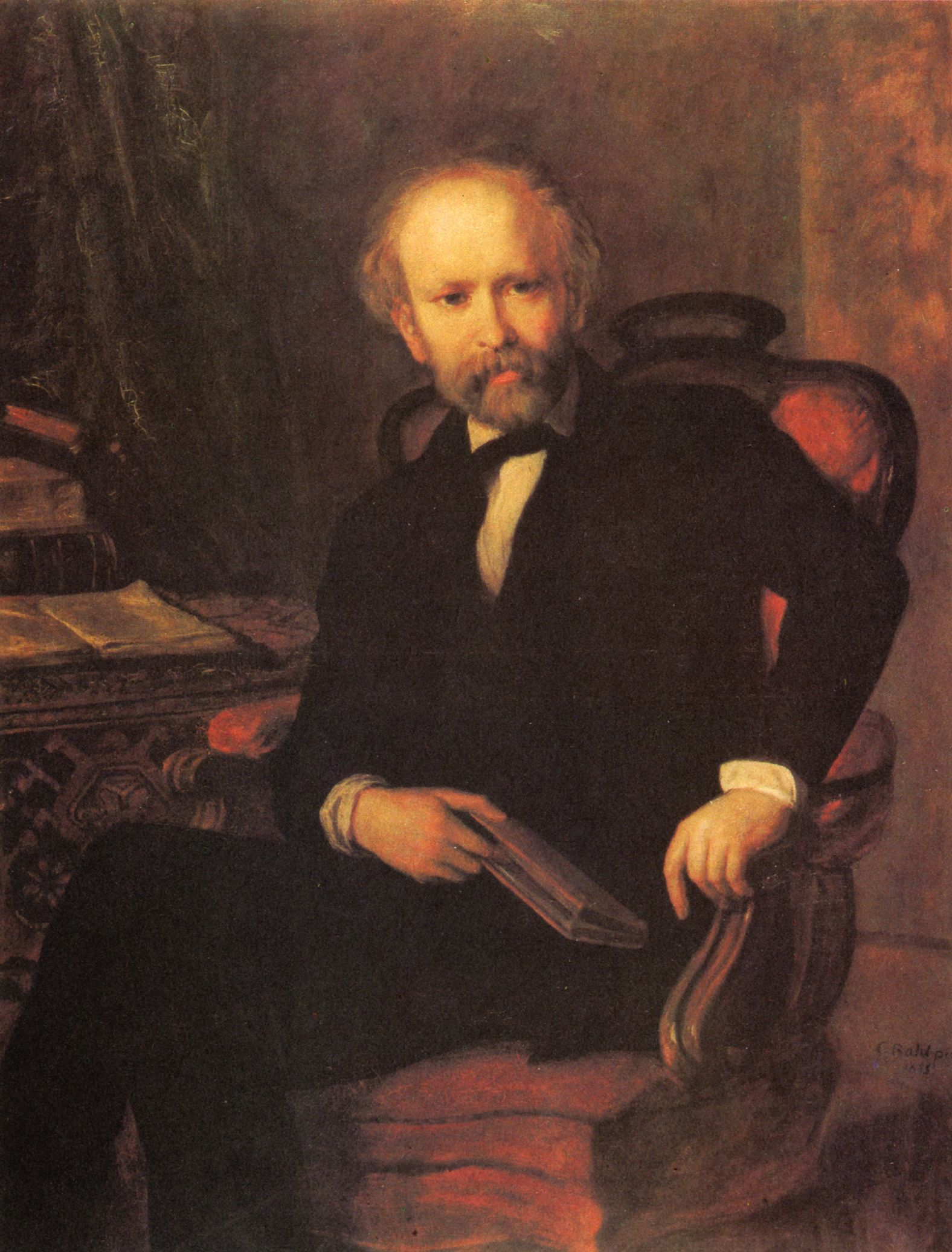
Friedrich Hebbel, painting by Carl Rahl, 1855

In 1840 the playwright Friedrich Hebbel wrote a poem in German titled "Requiem", its Latin title alluding to "Requiem aeternam" (eternal rest), the first words of the Mass for the Dead. The poem opens with an apostrophe to a "soul" in a plea, "Seele, vergiß sie nicht, Seele, vergiß nicht die Toten" (Soul, forget them not, soul, forget not the dead). These words appear to echo various psalms, such as Psalm 103, "Bless the Lord, O my soul". Hebbel, however, evokes an "eternal rest" that is distinctly non-religious: the poem offers no metaphysical reference, Christian or otherwise, but calls for remembrance as the only way to keep the dead alive. The first lines, in which the speaker calls upon the soul not to forget the dead, are repeated in the centre of the poem and again at its conclusion, as a refrain that sets apart two longer sections of verse. The first of these sections describes how the dead, nurtured by love, enjoy a final glow of life. In contrast, the latter section portrays a different fate for souls that have been forsaken: who are relegated to an unending, desolate struggle for renewed existence. The musicologist Katherine FitzGibbon notes that the speaker of this narrative is not identified, but may be "a poetic narrator, divine voice, or even the dead".

German

Seele, vergiss sie nicht,
Seele, vergiss nicht die Toten!

Sieh, sie umschweben dich,
Schauernd, verlassen,
Und in den heiligen Gluten,
Die den Armen die Liebe schürt,
Atmen sie auf und erwarmen
Und genießen zum letztenmal
Ihr verglimmendes Leben.

Seele, vergiss sie nicht,
Seele, vergiss nicht die Toten!

Sieh, sie umschweben dich,
Schauernd, verlassen,
Und wenn du dich erkaltend
Ihnen verschließest, erstarren sie
Bis hinein in das Tiefste.
Dann ergreift sie der Sturm der Nacht,
Dem sie, zusammengekrampft in sich,
Trotzten im Schoße der Liebe,

Und er jagt sie mit Ungestüm
Durch die unendliche Wüste hin,
Wo nicht Leben mehr ist, nur Kampf
Losgelassener Kräfte
Um erneuertes Sein!

Seele, vergiss sie nicht,
Seele, vergiss nicht die Toten!

English

Soul, forget them not,
Soul, forget not the dead!

See, they hover around you,
Shuddering, abandoned.
And in the holy glow (Note: literally: embers)
which love stokes for the poor,
they breathe in relief and warm again
And enjoy for a last time
their dimming life.

Soul, forget them not,
Soul, forget not the dead!

See, they hover around you,
Shuddering, abandoned.
And if you coldly
lock yourself up to them, they stiffen
up into the deepest.
Then the storm of the night grips them,
which they, cramped together,
defied in the bosom of love.

It chases them impetuously
through an endless wasteland,
Where there is no more life, only fight
of unleashed forces
for renewed existence!

Soul, forget them not,
Soul, forget not the dead!

The poem was published in 1857. Separately, Peter Cornelius set the same poem in 1863, as a funeral motet for a six-part chorus, in response to the author's death.

== Motet ==
Requiem
- Motet by Max Reger
- Opus: 83/10
- Text: "Requiem" by Hebbel
- Composed: 1912
- Scoring: Männerchor (men's chorus)

Reger composed his first setting of Hebbel's poem as a motet for unaccompanied male choir in 1912 in Meiningen, where he had worked from 1911. He composed it for the Basler Liedertafel, conducted by Hermann Suter, who performed it on 18 May 1912 to celebrate their 60th anniversary before giving the official premiere at the national Schweizer Eidgenössisches Sängerfest (Swiss federal song festival) in Neuchâtel on 22 July 1912.

In accordance with the poem's structure, Reger used the same material for each of the refrains, in a homophonic setting. The words "ihr verglimmendes Leben" (their dimming life) are illustrated by "a sequence of chromatically descending sixth chords". Similar descending chords are often found in Reger's works as a musical expression of "pain, fear, death, and suffering—common associations with chromaticism since the sixteenth century", according to FitzGibbon. Both the recurring refrain and the descending chords reappear in the later setting of the poem in the Hebbel Requiem.

The motet was published under the title Requiem as the closing part of Zehn Lieder für Männerchor (Ten songs for men's chorus), Op. 83, with earlier compositions from 1904.

== Lateinisches Requiem ==
Lateinisches Requiem
- Choral composition (fragment) by Max Reger
- Catalogue: WoO V/9
- Opus: 145a
- Text: Requiem
- Language: Latin
- Composed: 1914
- Performed: 28 May 1938 (movement 1); 3 November 1979
- Scoring: soloists; chorus; orchestra

After the outbreak of war, Reger intended to compose a work commemorating the soldiers who had died or were mortally wounded, a choral work of "großen Stils" (in great style). By the autumn of 1914, he was in discussion with a theologian in Giessen about a composition, tentatively titled "Die letzten Dinge (Jüngstes Gericht u. Auferstehung)" "(The Last Things [Final Judgment and Resurrection])". The organist Karl Straube, who had premiered several of Reger's organ works, recommended that Reger compose the traditional Latin Requiem instead, because Die letzten Dinge would only be a variation on Ein deutsches Requiem by Johannes Brahms. Following his advice, Reger managed the composition of the introit and Kyrie, combining both texts into one movement. He announced the project, a composition for soloists, chorus, orchestra and organ, to his publisher on 3 October 1914. The Dies irae remained unfinished. Reger wrote to Fritz Stein, his friend and later biographer, that he was in the middle of its composition, but had been interrupted after the line "statuens in parte dextra".

The Lateinisches Requiem is scored for soloists (soprano, alto, tenor, bass), a four-part (SATB) choir, three flutes (also piccolo), two oboes, cor anglais, two clarinets, two bassoons, contrabassoon, four horns, three trumpets, three trombones, tuba, three percussionists and strings. It is Reger's only choral composition to use four soloists. The four "Klangapparate" are used like the several choirs in compositions by Heinrich Schütz. The first movement opens with a long organ pedal point, which has been compared to the beginning of Wagner's Das Rheingold and the Brahms Requiem.

The work remained unfinished at Reger's death, and his publisher named the first movement the Lateinisches Requiem, Op. 145a. The music was first performed by Stein in Berlin on 28 May 1938 with four soloists and the enlarged choir of the Musikhochschule Berlin. For this performance, the liturgical Latin text was replaced by a German text, adapted to suit Nazi ideology. Hellmut von Hase titled his text Totenfeier (Rite of the Dead) and managed to serve "the Nazi adulation of the fallen war hero" (as FitzGibbon said), dropping references to the bible. He replaced for example "exaudi orationem meam, ad te omnis caro veniet" (Hear my prayer; to you shall all flesh come) by "In sorrow we mutely lower the flags, for into the grave sunk what was dear to us." This version was published in 1939 by the Max Reger Society.

The unfinished Dies irae was published in 1974 and first performed in Hamburg's St. Jakobi on 3 November 1979 by Yoko Kawahara, Marga Höffgen, Hans-Dieter Bader, Nikolaus Hillebrand, the NDR Chor and NDR Sinfonieorchester, conducted by Roland Bader.

The Lateinisches Requiem is officially catalogued as WoO V/9.

== Hebbel Requiem ==
=== History ===
Johannes Brahms, in his Ein deutsches Requiem (A German Requiem), had already opened the way for the composition of a non-liturgical Requiem, written in a language other than Latin while still addressing the traditional theme of rest (requies) for the dead. In this tradition, Reger's 1915 Requiem, Op. 144b, is also not a setting of the Requiem in Latin, but of Hebbel's poem. He composed it in Jena, a year before his own death, this time for a solo voice (alto or baritone), chorus and orchestra. The Requiem, Op. 144b, was combined with Der Einsiedler (The Hermit), Op. 144a, a setting of a poem by Joseph von Eichendorff, as Zwei Gesänge für gemischten Chor mit Orchester (Two songs for mixed chorus with orchestra), Op. 144. Reger titled the autograph of the piano version: Zwei Gesänge / für / gemischten Chor / mit Orchester / Nr. 2) Requiem / (Hebbel), and he wrote the dedication: Dem Gedenken der im / Kriege 1914/15 gefallenen / deutschen Helden (To the memory of the German heroes who fell in the War 1914/15).

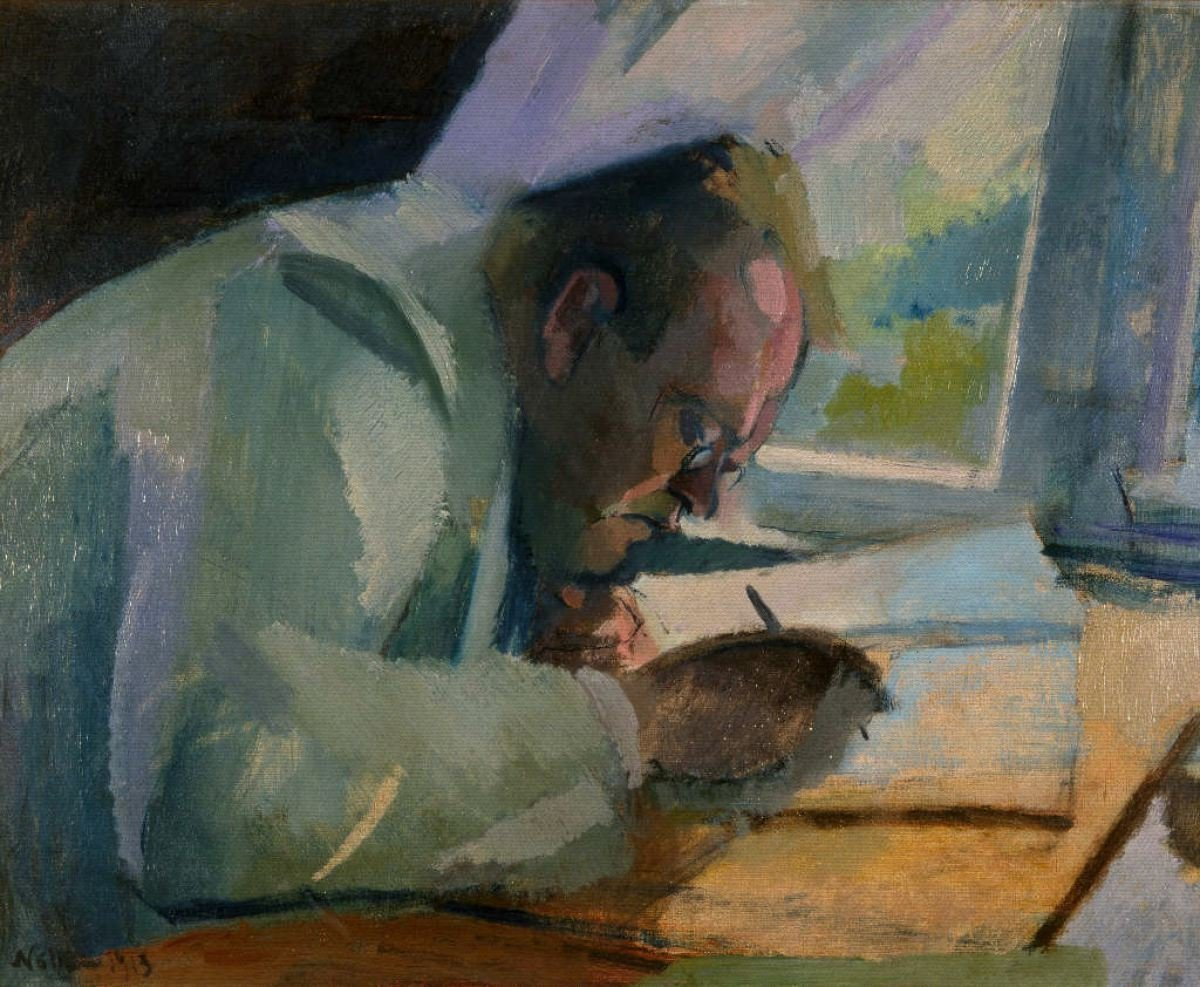
The composer at work, painting by Franz Nölken, 1913

Reger completed the composition on 25 August 1915. He wrote to the publisher N. Simrock on 8 September: "I've finished two choral works (Der Einsiedler and Requiem). I think I can safely say that they're both among the most beautiful things I've ever written." (Ich habe nun zwei Chorwerke (Der Einsiedler und Requiem) fertig. Ich glaube sagen zu dürfen, daß diese beiden Chorwerke mit das Schönste sind, was ich je geschrieben habe.) Requiem was first published by N. Simrock in 1916, edited by Ulrich Haverkampf, with the dedication Dem Andenken der im großen Kriege gefallenen deutschen Helden (To the memory of the German heroes who fell in the Great War). Simrock also published a vocal score as prepared by Reger himself.

The Hebbel Requiem was first performed, together with Der Einsiedler, in Heidelberg on 16 July 1916, after the composer's death, as part of a memorial concert for Reger, featuring Eva Katharina Lissmann, the choirs Bachverein and Akademischer Gesangverein, and the enlarged Städtisches Orchester (Municipal Orchestra), conducted by Philipp Wolfrum.

In 1925 the Requiem was published in Vienna as a pocket score, Philharmonia-Taschenpartitur No. 284. Edition Peters published it in 1928, stating the performance duration as 25 minutes, although the duration implied by the metronome marking is 14 minutes.

=== Music ===
==== Structure ====
Reger's Hebbel Requiem is in a single movement. It follows the overall form of the narrated poem, but with variations, resulting in differing moods throughout the piece. The beginning is recalled in the middle and at the end. The following table is based on the score and on an analysis by Katherine FitzGibbon. The translation of the incipits is given as in the liner notes of the 2009 recording in the translation by Richard Stokes. The four-part SATB chorus is often divided. The work is in D minor and common time. The tempo marking is Molto sostenuto, and is sustained with only slight modifications (stringendo and ritardando) until the most dramatic section, marked Più mosso (faster) and later Allegro, returning to the initial tempo for the conclusion.

Structure of Reger's Hebbel Requiem
Section	Text	Translation	Vocal	Marking
A	Seele, vergiß sie nicht	Soul, forget them not	Solo	Molto sostenuto
A	Sieh, sie umschweben dich	See, they hover around you	SSAATTBB	Molto sostenuto
B	und in den heiligen Gluten	And in the holy ardour	SATTBB	Molto sostenuto
A'	Seele, vergiß sie nicht	Soul, forget them not	Solo	Molto sostenuto
A'	Sieh, sie umschweben dich	See, they hover around you	SSAATTBB	Molto sostenuto
C	und wenn du dich erkaltend ihnen verschließest	And if, growing cold	SATB	Molto sostenuto
C	Dann ergreift sie der Sturm der Nacht	The storm of night then seizes them	SATB	Più mosso – Molto sostenuto – Allegro
A''	Seele, vergiß sie nicht	Soul, forget them not	Solo SATB (chorale melody)	Molto sostenuto

==== Sections ====
===== A =====
The instrumental introduction is based on a pedal point sustained for several measures, reminiscent of pedal points in funeral music by Schütz and Bach, in Mozart's Requiem in the same key of D minor, and in Reger's previous Latin Requiem. In a pattern similar to the beginning of A German Requiem, the bass notes are repeated, here on a low D (D1).

The soloist alone sings the intimate appellation "Seele, vergiß sie nicht" (Soul, forget them not) on a simple melody followed by "Vergiß sie nicht, die Toten" (Forget them not, the dead); the first line then returns with a different melody. Throughout the piece the soloist sings only these words, in the beginning and in the repeats. The chorus, here divided into eight parts, evokes the start of the spiritual ascent, "Sieh, sie umschweben dich, schauernd, verlassen" (See, they hover around you, shuddering, abandoned), in mostly homophonic chords, marked ppp, in a fashion reminiscent of Schütz.

===== B =====
In section B, "und in den heiligen Gluten" (and in the holy glowing), the pedal point ends. The chorus is divided into four to six parts, in more independent motion. As in works by Schütz, two or three voices often introduce new text.

===== A' =====
The soloist sings the recapitulation of the beginning similar to the first time, again on the pedal point, but repeats both lines this time, while the chorus sings about the hovering of the dead, as before.

===== C =====
In section C, "und wenn du dich erkaltend ihnen verschließest" (and if you coldly close yourself to them, they stiffen), Reger uses word painting, by means of downward lines and a final decrescendo for the line "erstarren sie bis hinein in das Tiefste" (they stiffen, up to the deepest). On the word "erstarren" (stiffens), the chorus settles on a dissonant 5-part chord, held for two measures, suddenly fortissimo with a crescendo at the end, then repeated pianissimo, an octave lower, motionless.

In great contrast, in "Dann ergreift sie der Sturm der Nacht" (The storm of night then grips them), a storm is depicted in dense motion of four parts imitating a theme in triplets.

===== A'' =====
In the conclusion, the soloist repeats its phrases in the first section, but this time the chorus finally joins in the words of the appellation. The soloist introduces a new musical theme on the line about not forgetting the dead. The chorus repeats these words, marked espressivo, dolcissimo, on the melody of the chorale "O Haupt voll Blut und Wunden", five stanzas of which Bach used in his St Matthew Passion. The melody is not repeated as in the original, but continued for half a line. Reger is known for quoting chorales in general and this one in particular, most often referring to its last stanza "Wenn ich einmal soll scheiden", which Bach included in the Passion right after the death of Jesus. The corresponding text would then be "Wenn ich einmal soll scheiden, so scheide nicht von mir. Wenn mir am allerbängsten ..." (When I must depart one day, do not part from me then. When the greatest anxiety ...).

Reger completes the chorale setting for the chorus, without further reference to the chorale melody, while the solo voice simultaneously continues to sing "Seele, vergiß nicht die Toten, concluding with a five-note passage that descends more than an octave, from the high D to the A an eleventh below.

==== Scoring and performances ====
The Requiem employs an orchestra of two flutes, piccolo, two oboes, cor anglais, two clarinets, two bassoons, four horns, three trumpets, three trombones, tuba, three percussionists and strings. It requires a chorus to match. Reger himself wrote a version for piano.

To make the music more accessible, the composer and organist Max Beckschäfer arranged the work for voice, chorus and organ in 1985. The organ version was premiered in the Marktkirche in Wiesbaden, where Reger had played the organ himself when he studied there in the 1890s. Gabriel Dessauer conducted a project choir, later known as the Reger-Chor. Beckschäfer was the organist, Ulrike Buchs the vocal soloist. The choir, expanded into the Reger-Chor-International by singers from Belgium, performed the work again in 2001 with organist Ignace Michiels from St. Salvator's Cathedral, Bruges, both there and in St. Bonifatius, Wiesbaden (recorded live). They performed it a third time in 2010 to celebrate the 25th anniversary of the Reger-Chor.

The Hebbel Requiem was performed as part of the Ouverture spirituelle of the 2014 Salzburg Festival, along with Bruckner's Fourth Symphony, with Plácido Domingo as baritone soloist and the Vienna Philharmonic conducted by Daniel Barenboim.

=== 2016 ===
To mark the centenary of Reger's death in 2016, the broadcaster Bayerischer Rundfunk staged a concert of the Hebbel Requiem in early May, conducted by Karl-Heinz Steffens. The Bachfest Leipzig 2016 programmed several works by Reger, including the Latin Requiem fragment in the opening concert at the Thomaskirche on 10 June, and the Hebbel Requiem there on 17 June, along with Der Mensch lebt und bestehet and O Tod, wie bitter bist du.

=== Evaluation ===
In a review of a recording of choral works by Reger, Gavin Dixon said that the Requiem is "almost mystical in its use of widely spaced chords, unusual harmonic shifts and dreamy arpeggios in the accompaniment". The program notes for the recording say that in the "anguished, expressionistic evocation of the 'shuddering', 'forsaken', 'cold' souls, the piece seems determined to expose death in all its grim horror".

Debra Lenssen wrote in her 2002 thesis about Reger's Op. 144:

As their composer's final completed works for chorus and orchestra, Der Einsiedler and Requiem, Op. 144a and 144b, demonstrate Max Reger's mature ability when setting poems of recognized literary merit. These powerful single-movement works from 1915 defy many stereotypes associated with their composer. They manifest a lyrical beauty, a dramatic compactness, and an economy of musical means. The central theme of both is mortality and death. In these challenging works, his mastery of impulse, technique, and material is apparent. Op. 144 constitutes both a continuation of Reger's choral/orchestral style in earlier works and, by dint of the composer's death as a mid-aged man, the culmination of it.

== Recordings ==
Recordings of Requiem (Reger)
Title	Conductor / Choir / Orchestra	Soloists	Label	Year
Max Reger, Chorstücke	Joachim Martini Junge Kantorei Symphonisches Orchester Berlin	Max van Egmond	Teldec (recorded live in the Berliner Philharmonie)	1969
Max Reger Requiem, Op. 144b; Lateinisches Requiem, Op. 145a; Dies irae	Roland Bader NDR Chor NDR Symphonieorchester	Yoko Kawahara; Marga Höffgen; Hans-Dieter Bader; Nikolaus Hillebrand	Koch Schwann (first performance of Dies irae)	1979
Max Reger Orchesterlieder Der Einsiedler, Op. 144a, Hymnus der Liebe, Op. 136, Requiem, Op. 144b, "An die Hoffnung", Op. 124	Gerd Albrecht: Choir of St. Michaelis; Monteverdi-Chor; Hamburg Philharmonic	Dietrich Fischer-Dieskau	Orfeo	1990
Max Reger: Der 100. Psalm; Der Einsiedler; Requiem (Hebbel)	Klaus Uwe Ludwig Bach-Chor Wiesbaden Bach-Orchester Wiesbaden	Anselm Richter	Melisma (recorded live in the Lutherkirche, Wiesbaden)	2000
Hebbel Requiem (organ version)	Gabriel Dessauer Reger-Chor	Ignace Michiels (organ)	(recorded live in St. Bonifatius, Wiesbaden)	2001
Max Reger (1873-1916) / Choral Works (piano version)	Andrew-John Smith Consortium	Alexander Learmonth; Christopher Glynn (piano)	Hyperion	2009
Max Reger - Requiem, An die Hofnung, Der Einsiedler; Gustav Mahler Orchestral Songs	Christoph Spering Chorus Musicus Köln Das neue Orchester	Anke Vondung	Capriccio	2023

== Bibliography ==
=== Scores ===
- 10 Gesänge, Op. 83 (Max Reger): Scores at the International Music Score Library Project
- Requiemsatz, Op. 145a: Scores at the International Music Score Library Project
- 2 Gesänge, Op. 144: Scores at the International Music Score Library Project
- Zwei Gesänge für gemischten Chor mit Orchester / 2 / Requiem (Hebbel). Edition Peters. 2010.

=== Max-Reger-Institute ===
- "Curriculum vitae". Max-Reger-Institute. Archived from the original on 28 September 2015.
- "Sechs Lieder Op. 4" (in German). Max-Reger-Institute.
- "Zehn Gesänge für Männerchor Op. 83" (in German). Max-Reger-Institute.
- "Zwei Gesänge Op. 144 / für Solostimme, gemischter Chor und Orchester" (in German). Max-Reger-Institute.
- "Requiem Op. 144b" (in German). Max-Reger-Institute.
- "Requiem WoO V/9" (in German). Max-Reger-Institute.

=== Books ===
- Grim, William (2005). Lateinisches Requiem für Soli, Chor und Orchester, Op. 145a. Musikproduktion Höflich.
- Lenssen, Debra (2002). "Max Reger's final choral/orchestral work: a study of opus 144 as culmination within continuity". University of Cincinnati. Archived from the original on 20 April 2016.
- McDermott, Pamela (2010). "The Requiem Reinvented: Brahms's Ein deutsches Requiem and the Transformation from Literal to Symbolic" (PDF). p. 201 of 226, 1.3 MB. Archived from the original (PDF) on 18 July 2011.
- Schönstedt, Rolf (2002). 7. Max Reger – Das Geistliche Lied als Orgellied – eine Gattung entsteht (in German). Hochschule für Kirchenmusik Herford. "Im 2.Teil zitiert der Sopran den c.f. O Haupt voll Blut und Wunden original, ohne Wiederholung bis zur ersten Halbzeile nach dem Stollen, ... Inbegriff dieses Passionsliedes war für Reger wohl stets die 9. Strophe Wenn ich einmal soll scheiden..., was aus einem Briefzitat an Arthur Seidl 1913 als bewiesen erscheint: 'Haben Sie nicht bemerkt, wie durch alle meine Sachen der Choral hindurchklingt: Wenn ich einmal soll scheiden?'"
- Sprondel, Friedrich (2014). Und die Toten werden die Stimme Gottes hören ... (PDF) (in German). Bachakademie.
- "Werke von Max Reger". Internationale Orgelkonzerte Wiesbaden (in German). Marktkirche, Wiesbaden. 1985.

=== Journals ===
- FitzGibbon, Katherine (2014). "Historicism and German Nationalism in Max Reger's Requiems" (PDF). The Choral Scholar. 4. National Collegiate Choral Organization. Archived from the original (PDF) on 2 April 2015.

=== Newspapers ===
- Hoernicke, Richard (2001). "Wenn Freunde musizieren". Wiesbadener Tagblatt (in German).
- Hoernicke, Richard (31 August 2010). "Gelungenes Finale der Musikwochen". Allgemeine Zeitung (in German).

=== Online sources ===
- Dellal, Pamela (2016). "BWV 244 – Matthäus-Passion". Emmanuel Music.
- Dixon, Gavin (2010). "Max Reger (1873-1916) / Choral Works". musicweb-international.com.
- Downes, Michael (2010). "Requiem, Op 144b". Hyperion Records.
- Eckle, Georg-Albrecht (2014). "Nur eine kleine Zeit / Max Reger's "Requiem"" (in German). Gesellschaft der Musikfreunde in Wien. Archived from the original on 2 April 2015.
- Eckle, Georg-Albrecht (29 April 2016). "Aus dem Reich der Toten / Max Reger und "sein" Requiem" (in German). Bayerischer Rundfunk.
- Farr, Robert J (2004). "Peter Cornelius (1824–1874) Seele, vergiss sie nicht Requiem". musicweb-international.com.
- Katzschmann, Christian. "Max Reger (1873–1916) Requiem, Op. 144b (Hebbel)" (in German). musiktext.de. Archived from the original on 19 July 2011.
- "Max Reger: Der 100. Psalm; Der Einsiedler; Requiem (Hebbel)". AllMusic. 2000.
- "Max Reger / Requiem "Seele, vergiß sie nicht" op. 144b" (PDF). Musikproduktion Höflich. 2005.
- Requiem, song for alto or baritone, chorus & orchestra, Op. 144b at AllMusic
- "Friedrich Hebbel / Requiem". Freiburger Anthologie (in German). Freiburg University. 2016. Archived from the original on 18 April 2016.
- "Max Reger (1873–1916) Requiem, Op. 144b/Op. 145a/Dies irae". classics-glaucus.blogspot.com. 2009.
- "Max Reger: Requiem, Op. 83/10". Boosey & Hawkes. 2010.
- "Werke von Max Reger im Bachfest 2016" (in German). Bachfest Leipzig.
- "Max Reger, Chorstücke (1969)". Junge Kantorei. Archived from the original on 29 January 2019.
- "#2 Gabriel Dessauer, Ignace Michiels" (in French). France Orgue.
- "Reger, Max Requiem Op.144b". Edition Peters. 2010. Archived from the original on 10 June 2012.
- "Reger: Requiem". prestoclassical.co. 2010.
- "Max Reger Kompositionen" (in German). maxreger.de. 2010. Archived from the original on 19 July 2011.
- "Konzert 2014" (PDF). Salzburg Festival.
