= Hans-Dieter Bader =

German operatic tenor (1938–2022)

- Born: 16 February 1938; Stuttgart, Germany
- Died: 18 June 2022 (aged 84); Hanover, Germany
- Occupation: Operatic tenor
- Organizations: Staatsoper Hannover
- Title: Kammersänger
- Awards: German Order of Merit

Hans-Dieter Bader (16 February 1938 – 18 June 2022) was a German operatic tenor. He performed for decades in leading roles as both a dramatic and a lyrical tenor at the Staatsoper Hannover. He appeared in around 90 operatic roles, as well as in concerts and oratorios. His recordings include the operas Feuersnot by Richard Strauss and Ermanno Wolf-Ferrari's Sly, and the concert premiere of Max Reger's unfinished Dies irae.

== Career ==
Bader was born on 16 February 1938 and raised in Stuttgart. He was initially apprenticed to learn tool making. He studied voice with Rudolf Gehrung, and made his stage debut at the Staatsoper Stuttgart in 1960 as Arturo in Donizetti's Lucia di Lammermoor.

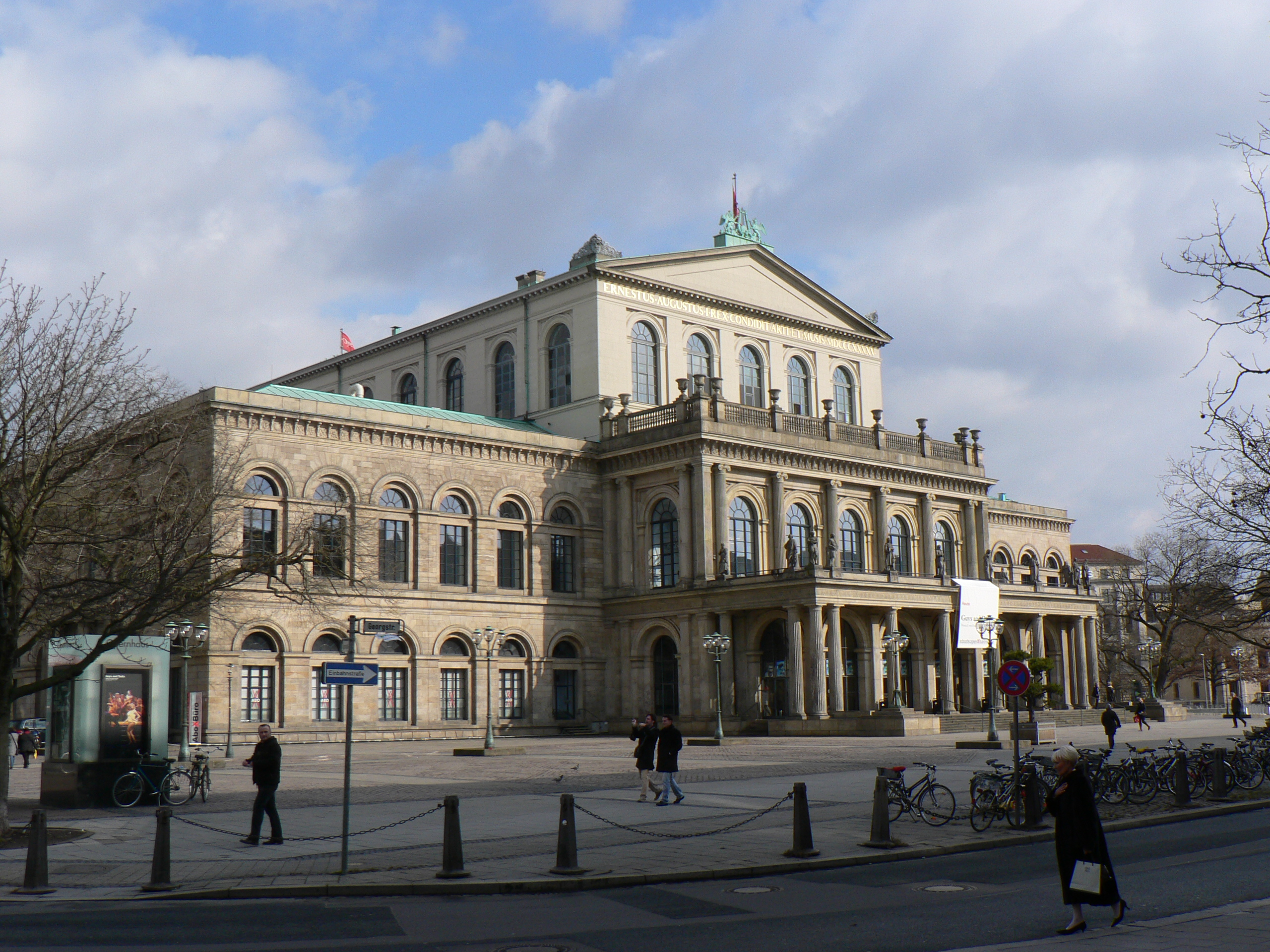
Staatsoper Hannover

He was engaged at the Staatstheater Braunschweig from 1962 and at the Städtische Bühnen Münster to 1965. He then moved to the Staatsoper Hannover, where he performed in major Heldentenor roles and in Italian opera. In 1967 he took part in the world premiere of Die Doppelgängerin by Jan Meyerowitz. His roles included Ferrando in Mozart's Così fan tutte, the title roles in both Offenbach's Hoffmanns Erzähungen and Gounod's Faust, Hans in Smetana's Die verkaufte Braut, the Duke in Verdi's Rigoletto and Rodolfo in Puccini's La bohème. In 1972, he performed the leading role of Valentin in Giselher Klebe's Die tödlichen Wünsche, conducted by Hans Herbert Jöris. In 1982, he appeared in the title role of Ermanno Wolf-Ferrari's Sly alongside Deborah Polaski; conducted by Robert Maxym, the production was recorded live in November that year. He also appeared in character tenor roles, such as Herodes in Salome by Richard Strauss in 1995. He performed as a guest at major German and European opera houses, such as the Opéra national du Rhin, Grand Théâtre de Genève, and the Vienna Volksoper.

On 3 October 1979, he was the tenor soloist in the first concert of Max Reger's unfinished Dies irae, part of the fragment of a Latin Requiem composed in 1914. Roland Bader conducted the NDR Chor and NDR Sinfonieorchester, with soloists Yoko Kawahara, Marga Höffgen, and Nikolaus Hillebrand. The concert was recorded live.

Bader died in Hanover on 18 June 2022 at age 84.

== Recordings ==
Bader recorded the operas Feuersnot by Richard Strauss and Wolf-Ferrari's Sly. A review of Sly notes that while singers such as Plácido Domingo have had to change high notes and cut substantially, Bader sings the demanding part "as written". Another reviewer noted: "Hans-Dieter Bader proving a magnetic presence as Sly", and "Bader and Polaski bear most of the vocal burden and they do so with considerable power."

== Awards ==
In 1981, Bader was awarded the title Kammersänger of the Staatsoper Hannover. In 1996, he received the Order of Merit of the Federal Republic of Germany.
