= Yoko Kawahara =

Japanese operatic soprano (born 1939)

- Born: 3 September 1939 (age 86); Tokyo, Japan
- Other names: Yoko Kawahara-Stobinski
- Education: Musikhochschule Köln
- Occupation: Operatic soprano

Yoko Kawahara (born 3 September 1939) is a Japanese operatic soprano who made a career first in Germany, then also appearing internationally at opera houses and festivals. Her repertory includes parts by Mozart as well as contemporary music, in both opera and concert.

== Career ==
Kawahara was born in Tokyo. She studied voice with Toshiko Toda, and made her debut in 1958 as Fiordiligi in Mozart's Così fan tutte at the Nikikai Opera Company in Tokyo.

She moved to Germany and continued her studies at the Musikhochschule Köln with Ellen Bosenius. After a performance as Pamina in Mozart's Die Zauberflöte at the Bonn Opera in 1969, she stayed with the company for three years. She appeared in 1972 at the Salzburg Festival with the Wiener Singakademie in Honegger's oratorio Jeanne d'Arc au bûcher, conducted by Martin Turnovsky. She appeared as a guest internationally, including the Bavarian State Opera, the Frankfurt Opera, the Rouen Opera House and the Nikikai Opera where she appeared as Euridice in Gluck's Orfeo ed Euridice.

Kawahara appeared at the Bayreuth Festival, first in 1972 as Voice of the Forest Bird in Siegfried, Woglinde in Der Ring des Nibelungen, and a Flower Maiden in Parsifal. She performed the first two parts in the production Jahrhundertring, celebrating the festival's centenary in 1976, conducted by Pierre Boulez and staged by Patrice Chéreau.

On 3 October 1979 she was the soprano soloist in the first concert of Max Reger's unfinished Dies irae, part of the fragment of a Latin Requiem composed in 1914. Roland Bader conducted the NDR Chor and NDR Sinfonieorchester, with soloists Marga Höffgen, Hans-Dieter Bader and Nikolaus Hillebrand. The concert was recorded live. On 25 April 1982 she appeared in the premiere of Udo Zimmermann's Die wundersame Schustersfrau at the Schwetzingen Festival, in the role of Die grüne Nachbarin (The green neighbour). In 1986 she appeared in New York with the New York Philharmonic in the opening of their Horizons series at Avery Fisher Hall, singing excerpts from Ligeti's opera Le Grand Macabre, conducted by Zoltán Peskó.
