= Drei Chöre, Op. 6 =

Set of compositions by Max Reger

Drei Chöre
- Choral compositions by Max Reger
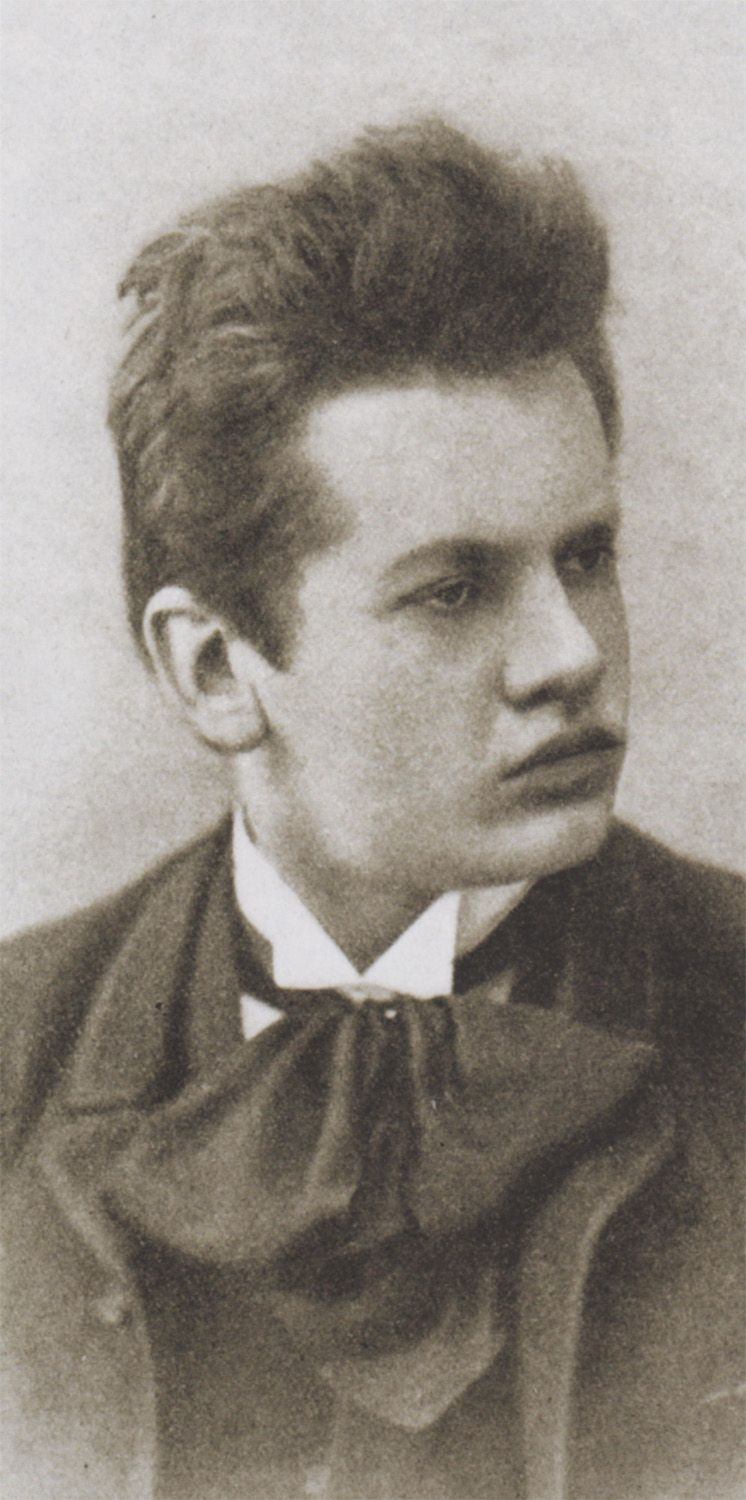
- The composer as a student in Wiesbaden, 1890
- English: Three chorale compositions
- Opus: 6
- Language: German
- Composed: 1892

Drei Chöre (Three chorale compositions), Op. 6, is a set of three compositions for mixed choir and piano by Max Reger, composed before 2 August 1892 in Wiesbaden. The texts are poems by three poets:

1. Trost
2. Zur Nacht
3. Abendbild

== History ==
Reger composed the three settings before 2 August 1892 in Wiesbaden. Dedicated to Adalbert Lindner, they were published by Augener & Co in London, probably before mid of May 1893, with an English translation by C. Hugo Laubach.

== Movements ==
=== 1. Trost ===
The text of Trost (Consolation) is a poem by Anton Müller, beginning with the line "Es ist kein Weh auf Erden" (There is no suffering on earth).

=== 2. Zur Nacht ===
The text of Zur Nacht (At Night) is a poem by Franz Engel with the incipit "Nun fallen die Augen müde mir zu" (Now my tired eyes close).

=== 3. Abendbild ===
The text of Abendbild (Evening Image) is a poem by Nicolaus Lenau beginning with "Friedlicher Abend senkt sich aufs Gefild" (Peaceful evening sinks on the fields).

== Performance and recording ==
The first and third work were early performed on 11 December 1906 in Charlottenburg, conducted by Lili Menar. The second piece was performed on 22 November 1911 in Berlin, conducted by John Petersen.

The three Chöre were recorded in 2009 in a collection of Reger's choral works, along with the Hebbel Requiem, among others, by the chamber choir Consortium and the pianist Christopher Glynn, conducted by Andrew-John Smith.

== Autograph ==
The autograph of the work was acquired in 2014 by the Max-Reger-Institute from the dissolved archive of the Schott Verlag in Mainz. Susanne Popp, a Reger scholar and the director of the institute, notes that in Opus 6, Reger noticed reading the proofs from the publisher that his handwriting was a problem because of many dynamic markings in addition to many notes, and that he therefore began to write the dynamics in red, a habit he kept for life. The autograph was presented in an exhibition of the Baden State Library in 2015, in preparation for the Reger Year 2016.

== Bibliography ==
- Dixon, Gavin (2010). "Max Reger (1873–1916) / Choral Works". musicweb-international.com.
- Downes, Michael (2010). "Requiem, Op 144b". Hyperion Records.
- "Drei Chöre, Op. 6". 2016.
- "Max-Reger-Institut in Karlsruhe / "Neue Fülle"" (in German). SWR.
