= Heinz Schubert (composer) =

German composer and conductor

Heinz Richard Schubert (8 April 1908 – 1945) was a German composer and conductor. He is not related to the more well known composer Franz Schubert.

== Life ==
Schubert was born in Dessau where he studied with Franz von Hoesslin and Arthur Seidl and in Munich with Hugo Röhr and Heinrich Kaminski. From 1926 to 1929, he was a master student of Siegmund von Hausegger and Joseph Haas at the University of Music and Performing Arts Munich.

In 1929, Schubert became theatre ensemble Kapellmeister in Dortmund and Hildesheim. After the Machtergreifung by the Nazis in 1933, he joined the National Socialist German Workers' Party under the number 3.119.361 and became Kapellmeister in Flensburg in the same year. In 1936, his oratorio Das ewige Reich based on a text by Wilhelm Raabe for baritone, male choir and organ, was premiered. It was commissioned on the occasion of the Reichstagung der Kampfbund für deutsche Kultur. From 1938 until 1945, he was (with a break in 1942, when he worked in Münster) the municipal music director and musical director at the theatre in Rostock, conducting the municipal orchestra.

Although he was able to make a successful career as a conductor during the National Socialist era, Schubert, following in the footsteps of Kaminski, refused to make concessions to those in power in his compositional work. In addition, he continued to conduct music by Kaminski even after the latter had been banned from performing as an alleged "Half-Jew".

Schubert came under increasing pressure in the early 1940s due to his inner distance to the regime, but he remained largely undisturbed by the influence of his patron Wilhelm Furtwängler until shortly before the end of the war. Thus Furtwängler performed two works by Schubert in concerts of the Berlin Philharmonic; on 5 February 1939 Schubert's Prelude and Toccata for String Orchestra and on 6 December 1942 Schubert's Hymnic Concerto for soprano, tenor, organ and orchestra.

In the last year of the war, Schubert was drafted to the Volkssturm and was last registered as a gunner with the unit field post number 44.380C. His last message is dated 28 February 1945. He was probably killed in the battle of Oderbruch. Officially he has been missing since the end of 1945 and was declared dead on 31 December 1945.

After the end of the Second World War, his work was largely forgotten. Most of Schubert's score manuscripts had also been destroyed by war.

Among the few contemporary recordings are two 1940 ones by Deutsche Grammophon Gesellschaft with the Berliner Philharmoniker conducted by the composer: a recording of Praeludium and Toccata for string trio and double string orchestra with Erich Röhn, violin, Reinhard Wolf, viola and Tibor de Machula, cello, and a recording of the Concertanten Suite for violin and chamber orchestra with the violinist Heinz Stanske as well as a radio recording of his Hymnic Concerto as a concert recording with the Berlin Philharmonic Orchestra, the soprano Erna Berger, the tenor Walther Ludwig and the organist Fritz Heitmann under the conduct of Wilhelm Furtwängler from December 1942. In the seventies, the Bayerischer Rundfunk produced the Ambrosian Concert with the pianist Gerhard Puchelt.

In the course of the rediscovery of composers such as Heinrich Kaminski and Reinhard Schwarz-Schilling, Schubert's work has recently received late recognition, which is reflected in the reprints of several compositions.

== See also ==
- List of people who disappeared

== Work ==
- Sinfonietta for large orchestra, 1929
- Concertante Suite for violin and chamber orchestra, 1931-1932
- Die Seele on a text from the Upanishads for alto and orchestra
- Hymn after Nietzsche's Zarathustra
- Lyrisches Concert for viola and chamber orchestra
- Verkündigung after the Upanishads, 1936
- Das ewige Reich after Wilhelm Raabe, 1936
- Praeludium and Toccata for double string orchestra, 1936
- Hymnic Concerto for soprano, tenor, organ and orchestra, 1939
- Vom Unendlichen after Nietzsche's Zarathustra for soprano and three string quintets, 1941
- Ambrosian Concerto, choral fantasy about "Verleih uns Frieden gnädiglich" for piano and small orchestra, 1943
- Skizzen zu einem Concerto solemnis
