= Alexander Learmonth =

Alexander Learmonth may refer to:

- Alexander Learmonth (politician) (1829–1887), British Army officer and politician
- Alexander Learmonth (baritone), English baritone
