= Die wundersame Schustersfrau =

Opera by Udo Zimmermann and Eberhard Schmidt

- Opera by Udo Zimmermann
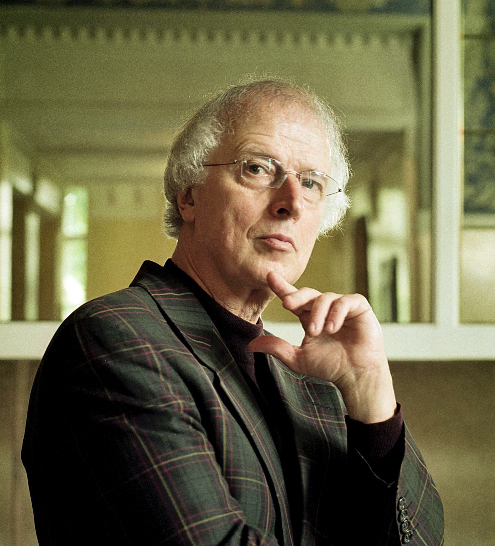
- The composer
- Translation: The Wondrous Cobbler's Wife
- Librettist: Zimmermann; Eberhard Schmidt
- Language: German
- Based on: Lorca's La zapatera prodigiosa
- Premiere: 25 April 1982; Schlosstheater Schwetzingen

Die wundersame Schustersfrau (The Wondrous Cobbler's Wife) is an opera in two acts by Udo Zimmermann, with a libretto which he wrote with Eberhard Schmidt based on the 1930 Spanish play La zapatera prodigiosa, a farsa violenta by Federico García Lorca, in the translation by Enrique Beck. The opera was first performed on 25 April 1982 at the Schlosstheater Schwetzingen, staged by Alfred Kirchner.

== History ==
Die wundersame Schustersfrau is Zimmermann's fifth opera and the first not premiered in the GDR. He wrote it on a commission by the broadcaster Süddeutscher Rundfunk after the success of his opera Der Schuhu und die fliegende Prinzessin at the 1977 Schwetzingen Festival. The libretto, based on Enrique Beck's German version of Lorca's La zapatera prodigiosa, was written by the composer and Lutz Eberhard Schmidt. Zimmermann completed the composition in 1981.

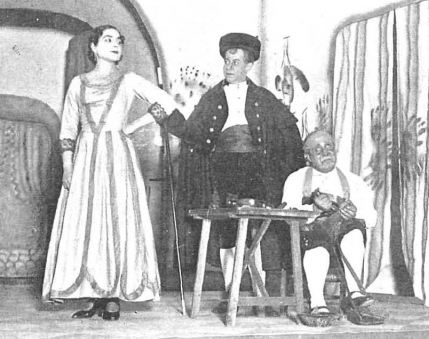
Scene from La zapatera prodigiosa, 1931

The premiere, as part of the Schwetzingen Festival at the Schlosstheater Schwetzingen on 25 April 1982, was produced by the Hamburg State Opera, conducted by Peter Gülke and staged by Alfred Kirchner. During the same season, the opera was performed in Karlsruhe, Bielefeld and the Leipzig Opera, the first performance in the GDR.

The stage director Michael Heinicke wrote a version suitable for small stages in 1985, which was performed in Bautzen, Meiningen, at the Staatstheater Nürnberg, and in 1988 at the first Munich Biennale. It was performed in Bonn in 1989 (conducted by the composer), Regensburg in 1992, Klagenfurt in 1993, and at the Deutsche Oper am Rhein in Duisburg in 1996.

== Roles ==
Role	Voice type	Premiere cast, 25 April 1982 Conductor: Peter Gülke
Schustersfrau	soprano	Lisbeth Balslev
Schuster	baritone or bass-baritone	Franz Grundheber
Gelbe Nachbarin	soprano	Hildegard Uhrmacher
Grüne Nachbarin	soprano	Yoko Kawahara
Violette Nachbarin	mezzo-soprano	Gertrud Ottenthal
Rote Nachbarin	contralto	Olive Fredericks
Schwarze Nachbarin	contralto	Ursula Boese
Two daughters of the Rote Nachbarin	soprano	
Küstersfrau	mezzo-soprano	
Bürgermeister	bass	Ude Krekow
Don Amsel	tenor	
Bursche mit der Schärpe	tenor	
Bursche mit dem Hut	baritone	
Knabe	mezzo-soprano, composed speaking role	

== Music ==
A critic of the premiere noted the opera's expressivity, beginning with a beginning of one central tone, intensified in rhythm and dynamics, a "chiffre" repeated in emotional situations. Other elements are fake-folklore, use of the celesta reminiscent of Mozart, and repeated strong beats marking rage. Zimmermann wrote complex ensembles in octets of women.

== Recording ==
Excerpts from Act 2 were recorded as part of the series Musik in Deutschland 1950–2000 under the title Nach- und Nachtgesänge – Oper 1977–1987 – Werke von Kirchner, U. Zimmermann, Matthus, W. Zimmermann, Rihm. As in the premiere, Peter Gülke conducted the Philharmonisches Staatsorchester Hamburg.
