= Schwarz-Schilling =

Schwarz-Schilling is a surname. Notable people with the surname include:

- Christian Schwarz-Schilling (1930–2026), Austrian-German politician
- Reinhard Schwarz-Schilling (1904–1985), German composer
