= Alexander Learmonth (baritone) =

- Occupation: Classical baritone

Alexander Learmonth is an English baritone in opera and concert.

Learmonth studied in the choir of New College, Oxford. He completed an opera course at the Advanced Performers Studio in May 2011. His appearances on the opera stage include parts by Mozart, Publio in La clemenza di Tito, the title role in Le nozze di Figaro, Don Alfonso in Così fan tutte and Macbeth in Macbeth. Learmonth performed the roles of Dandini in Rossini's La Cenerentola, Counsel in Gilbert & Sullivan's Trial by Jury, Colline in Puccini's La bohème and Simone in his Gianni Schicchi, and the Traveller in Britten's Curlew River..

== Recordings ==
Learmonth recorded in 2010 the solo part in Max Reger's Der Einsiedler with the chamber choir Consortium and pianist Christopher Glynn, conducted by Andrew-John Smith.
