= Hugo Röhr =

German conductor and composer

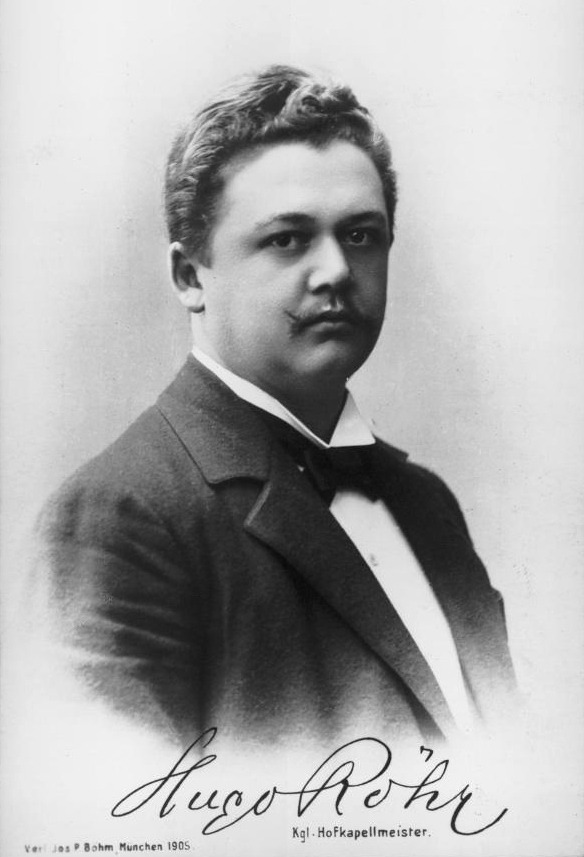
- Hugo Röhr in 1905
- Born: 13 February 1866; Dresden, Saxony
- Died: 7 June 1937 (aged 71); Munich, Bavaria
- Education: Dresden Conservatory
- Occupations: Conductor; Composer
- Organizations: Bavarian Court Theatre; Akademie der Tonkunst

Hugo Röhr (13 February 1866 – 7 June 1937) was a German conductor, composer and academic teacher.

== Life ==
Born in Dresden, Röhr studied with Franz Wüllner, Adolf Blaßmann and Felix Draeseke at the conservatory in Dresden. Röhr first worked as a solo répétiteur at the court opera there in 1886 and as a conductor at the Theater Augsburg municipal theatre in 1887/88. In the 1888/89 season, he worked at the Hoftheater Kassel, then at the Deutsches Landestheater in Prague and from 1890 until 1892 in Breslau, where he married the soprano Sofie Röhr-Brajnin, who became famous later on. Especially from 1897, he accompanied her at her recitals in Munich. From 1892 until 1896, he was first Kapellmeister at the Nationaltheater Mannheim, from 1896 he succeeded Hermann Levi at the court theatre in Munich and in 1899 he was appointed court Kapellmeister. There, he also became recognised as composer with his oratorio Ekkehard, which he conducted within the famous concert series Musikalische Akademie in both 1901 and 1902. In 1904, he created his first opera, Das Vaterunser, to a libretto by Ernst von Possart, performed at the court theatre. In 1922 he became a lecturer at the Akademie der Tonkunst, Munich, where he became appointed professor after one year, and was a teacher for conducting and directed the opera school and orchestra exercises until 1934. His students there included Otto Schulmann, Heinz Schubert, Fanny Pracher, Paul Kühmstedt, Heinrich Sutermeister and Paul Ben-Haim. Between 1911 and 1914, he directed the Munich teachers' choral society.

Röhr died in Munich at the age of 71.

== Work ==
Röhr's compositions include three operas, vocal and chamber music.

=== Operas ===
- Das Vaterunser, premiere in Munich on 14 May 1904
- Frauenlist, premiere in Leipzig in 1917
- Coeur-Dame, premiere in Munich in 1927

=== Oratorio ===
- Ekkehard, premiere in Innsbruck in 1900
