= Heinrich Kaminski =

German composer

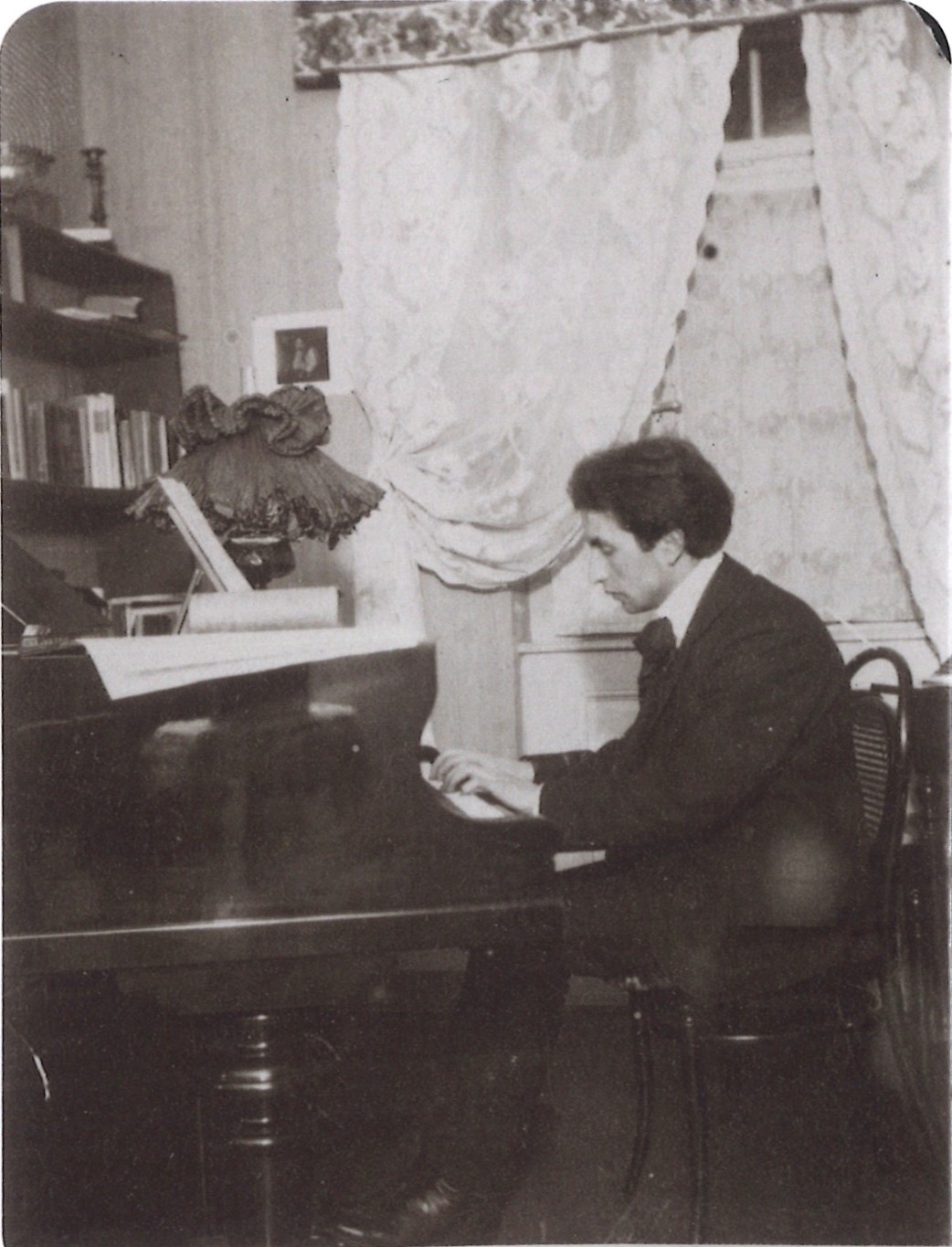

Heinrich Kaminski (4 July 1886 - 21 June 1946) was a German composer.

== Life ==
Kaminski was born in Tiengen in the Schwarzwald, the son of an Old Catholic priest of Jewish parentage. After a short period working in a bank in Offenbach, he moved to Heidelberg, originally to study politics. However, a chance meeting with Martha Warburg changed his mind: she recognised his musical gift and became his patroness. In 1909 he went to Berlin and began studying music at the Stern Conservatoire, piano with Severin Eisenberger.

In 1914, he began work as a piano teacher in Benediktbeuern. His friends and contemporaries at this time included the painters Emil Nolde and Franz Marc, whose wife was among his piano students.

In 1916, he married Friederike Mathilde Jopp, the daughter of Karl and Marie Jopp (born Schad). Friederike, or Elfriede as Kaminski called her, was a singer in Munich.

During World War I, Kaminski was also active as a choirmaster and teacher of composition. Later he received a professorship at the Prussian Academy of Arts in Berlin, where he became director of a master class in composition (thus treading in the footsteps of Hans Pfitzner). His most significant pupils were Carl Orff, Heinz Schubert and Reinhard Schwarz-Schilling.

His contract was terminated in 1933 with no renewal on the grounds of his "political opinions" and he returned to Benediktbeuern. Various attempts to re-establish his career came to nothing for the same reason. A check of his ancestry - he had been categorised in 1938 as a "half-Jew", and in 1941 declared a "quarter-Jew" - led to an ongoing ban on the performance of his works. He found himself obliged to flee, to France and Switzerland among other places.

Between 1939 and 1945 he lost three children, and died himself in 1946 at Ried, Bavaria.

== Works ==
His works includes chorales, concertos, songs, choral sonatas, motets and other choral works, as well as operas.

- Operas:
  - Das Spiel vom König Aphelius ("The Game of King Aphelius")
- Choral sonatas:
  - Psalm 130
  - Der Tag ist hin ("The Day Is Ended")
- Concerto grosso
- Chamber music
  - String quintet (1914), arranged for string orchestra (1928)
