= Otto Schulmann =

German conductor and vocalist teacher (1902–1989)

Otto Schulmann (December 20, 1902 – February 6, 1989) was a German-born conductor and vocalist teacher.

== Birth and Early career ==
Schulmann had Jewish origins but was baptized as a Catholic. His father owned a small bank in Munich. Schulmann was a student of the German composer Hugo Röhr. In 1929 he was chief conductor (Erster Kapellmeister) at the theater (Stadttheater) in Ulm when Herbert von Karajan was appointed there as his junior colleague. After the takeover of the Nazi government in 1933 he was forced out of his job and Karajan was promoted. For a brief period Schulmann was able to work as an operetta conductor in Klagenfurt. When this job came to an end he no longer had any position so he traveled to Milan to embark with his wife Sophie for America. Sophie Schulmann, née Sofie Rappel, was a singer at the Stadttheater Ulm; she performed under Karajan as Zerlina in Don Giovanni, as Lola in Cavalleria Rusticana, and in Rigoletto (Karajan archive). The couple had to wait in a Cuban refugee camp until 1939 when they were admitted to the United States.

== Life in San Francisco ==
Schulmann settled down in San Francisco and taught voice; his wife Sophie first worked as a chef to save money for opening a restaurant. In 1952 Otto Schulmann became an instructor for voice and opera at Stanford University. With other distinguished colleagues, such as Mynard and Mary Groom Jones, Edgar Jones, Amy MacMurray, Byron Jones, Ellsworth Walston and Josephine Taggard, Otto Schulmann was instrumental in creating by the late 1950s and 1960s a unique teaching environment for singers in the San Francisco Bay Area. His students gave recitals and he audited voice tryouts for students interested in exploring their talent in singing. On such an occasion he discovered and subsequently taught (1955–1957) the famous Wagner tenor Jess Thomas. Another student of Schulmann was the mezzosoprano and soprano Janis Martin, a famous international Wagner performer as well. Also the soprano and musicologist Marilyn F. Feller-Somville was Schulmann's student, she later became the director of the School of Music at University of Iowa and dean of the Mason Gross School of the Arts at Rutgers University. From 1958 to 1968 Schulmann taught at the San Francisco Conservatory of Music, where one of his students was the tenor Ronald Moreno Gallegos.
