= Ursula Boese =

German operatic contralto

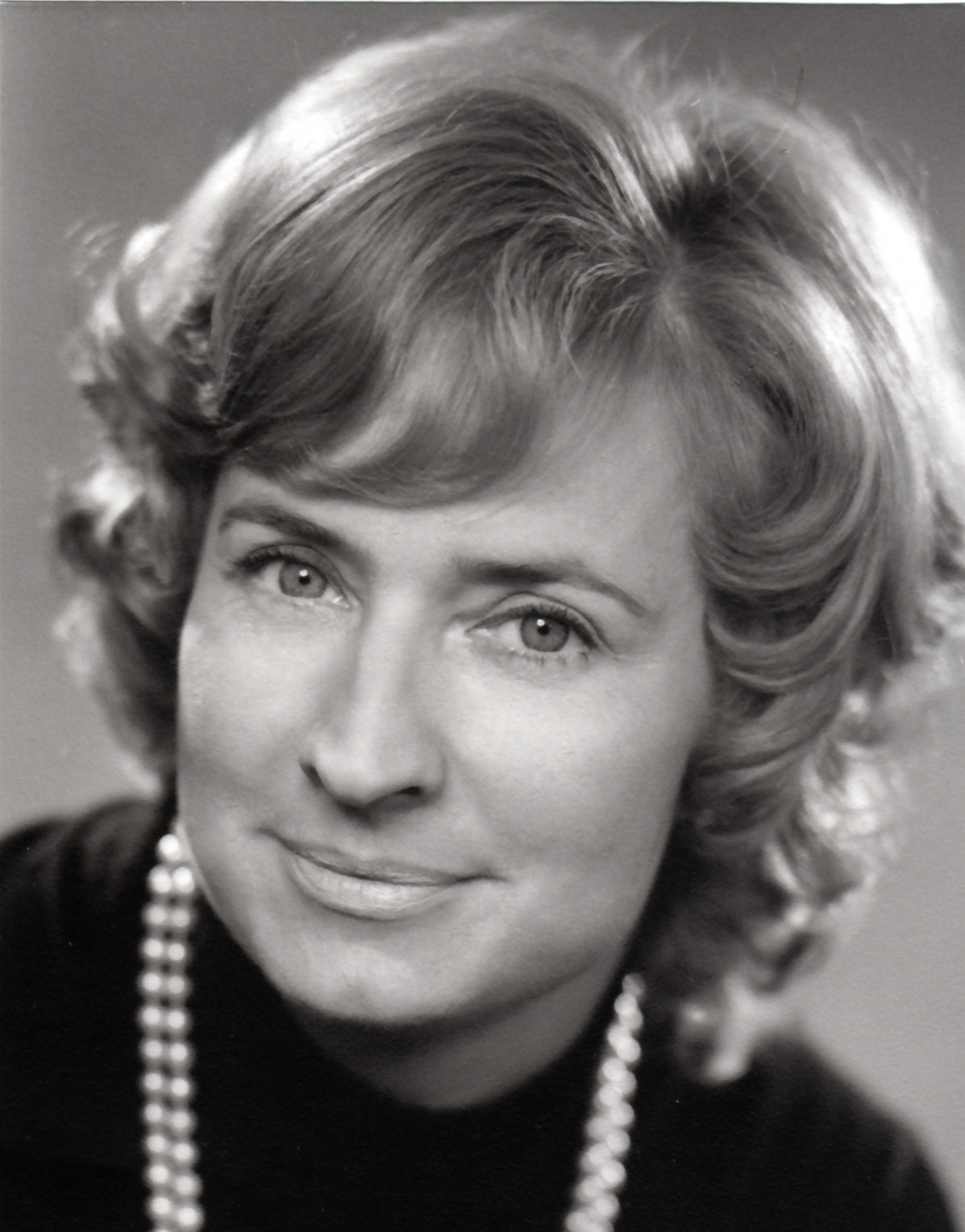
- Born: 27 July 1928; Hamburg, Germany
- Died: 25 October 2016 (aged 88); Hamburg, Germany
- Education: Musikhochschule Hamburg
- Occupation: Operatic contralto
- Organizations: Hamburgische Staatsoper
- Title: Kammersängerin

Ursula Boese (27 July 1928 – 25 October 2016) was a German operatic contralto. A member of the Hamburg State Opera from 1960 to 1993, she pursued an international career. She appeared as Stravinsky's Iocaste at the San Francisco Opera in the presence of the composer, as Wagner's Fricka in Wieland Wagner's last production of the Ring Cycle at the Bayreuth Festival, and as Verdi's Ulrica alongside Luciano Pavarotti.

== Life ==
Born in Hamburg, Boese studied voice at the Musikhochschule Hamburg in her hometown, graduating with a diploma, and began as a concert singer during her studies.

In 1958, she appeared at the Bayreuth Festival for the first time, making her stage debut, as Floßhilde and the Second Norn in Der Ring des Nibelungen conducted by Hans Knappertsbusch. She sang several roles there, including Fricka in the Ring Cycle in 1965, staged by Wieland Wagner.

She became a member of the Hamburg State Opera (HSO) in 1960, where she remained until her retirement in 1993. In 1968 she created the role of Miss Penelope Newkirk in the world premiere of Gian Carlo Menotti's Help, Help, the Globolinks! at the HSO. She was awarded the title Hamburgische Kammersängerin on 21 May 1969 by Rolf Liebermann.

She appeared at the Vienna State Opera, first in 1960 as the First Norn in Götterdämmerung, and in 1963 at La Scala in Milan as Iocaste in Stravinsky's Oedipus Rex. She also appeared as a guest at the Royal Opera House in London, in Rome, Venice, Turin, at the Teatro Colón in Buenos Aires, the Chicago Opera, the Liceu in Barcelona, and the Paris Opéra. She sang at the Edinburgh Festival and the Holland Festival. With the Hamburg ensemble, she appeared in Florence, the Metropolitan Opera in New York City, the Opéra de Montréal, the Mariinsky Theatre in Saint Petersburg, in Moscow and in Tokyo.

Boese took part in world premieres, such as Mrs. Bradshaw in Alexander Goehr's Arden muß sterben in Hamburg on 5 March 1967, and as the Schwarze Nachbarin in Udo Zimmermann's Die wundersame Schustersfrau at the Schwetzingen Festival on 25 April 1982. She sang Jocasta at the San Francisco Opera in 1968 in Stravinsky's Oedipus Rex, with Stravinsky in the audience. In 1969, she was the partner of Joan Sutherland in Handel's Giulio Cesare. In 1973, she appeared as Ulrica in a new production of Verdi's Un ballo in maschera, alongside Luciano Pavarotti and Sherrill Milnes.

== Autobiography ==
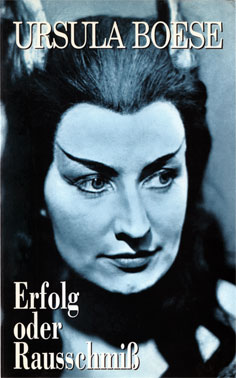
Cover of her autobiography

- Ursula Boese. Erfolg oder Rausschmiß. Auf den Opernbühnen von Bayreuth, Hamburg, Paris… U. Boese, Hamburg 1993 (140 p.)
