= Jess Thomas =

American operatic tenor (1927–1993)

- Born: Jess Floyd Thomas; August 4, 1927; Hot Springs, South Dakota, United States
- Died: October 11, 1993 (aged 66); Tiburon, California, United States
- Occupation: Opera singer
- Known for: Wagnerian opera

Jess Thomas (August 4, 1927 – October 11, 1993) was an American operatic tenor, best known for singing the works of Richard Wagner.

== Early life and education ==
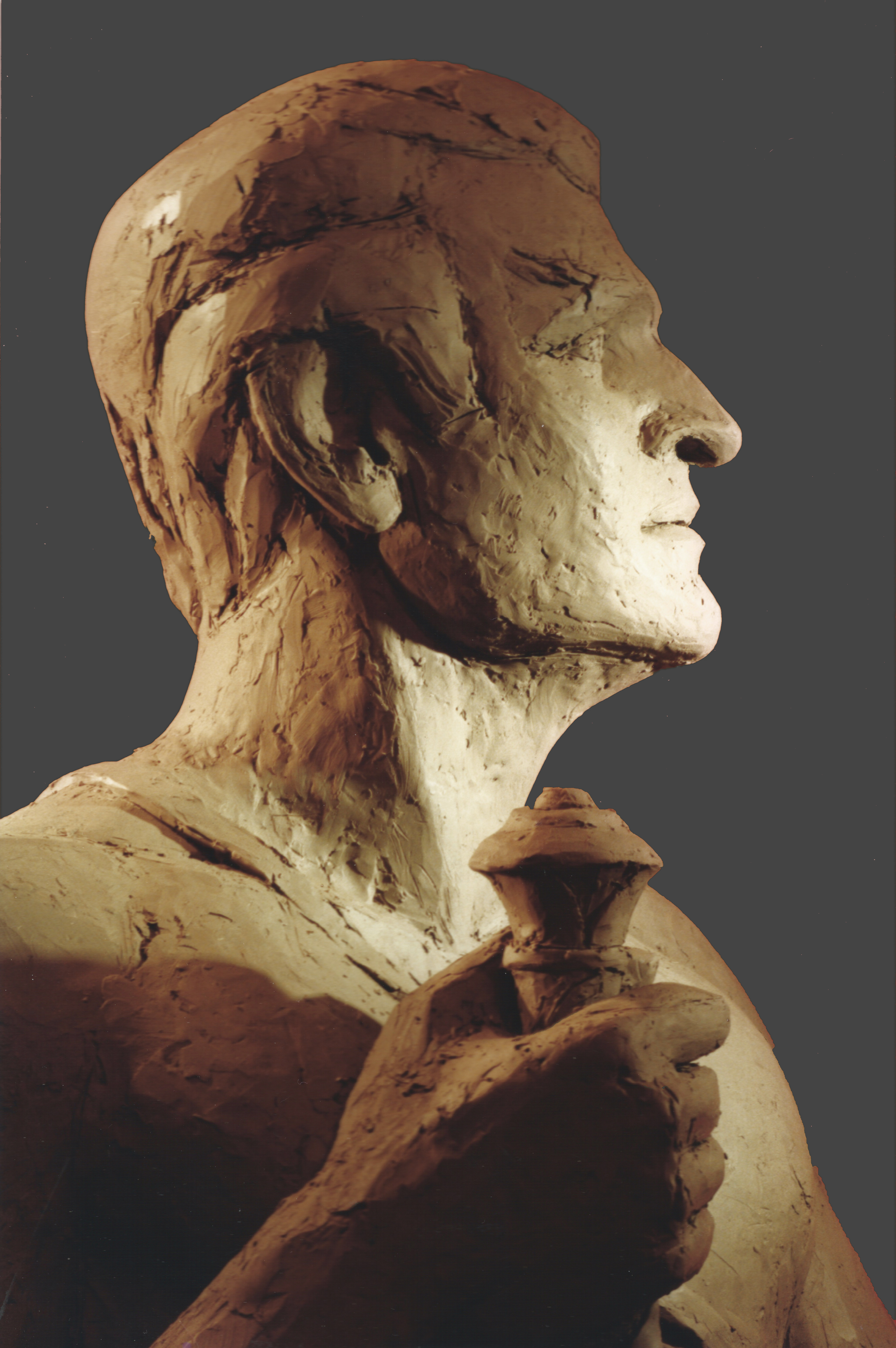
Hortensia: Sculpture of Jess Thomas, 1997

Jess Floyd Thomas was born in Hot Springs, South Dakota. As a child, he took part in various musical activities and studied psychology at the University of Nebraska. For several years, he worked as a high school guidance counselor, before enrolling at Stanford University for an MA. Learning that the operatic department was producing Verdi's Falstaff, he auditioned for Otto Schulmann, the vocal professor, and obtained the role of Fenton. He studied with Schulmann for three years before his operatic debut in 1957.

== Operatic career ==
Thomas debuted in 1957 for the San Francisco Opera, performing in Richard Strauss's Der Rosenkavalier as the Haushofmeister. In 1958, he performed in the title role of Richard Wagner's Lohengrin for the Badisches Staatstheater Karlsruhe at the commencement of a career in Germany.

At Bayreuth, he established his reputation as a Wagnerian tenor, performing in the following roles and operas:

- Parsifal 1961–63, 1965
- Lohengrin 1962, 1967
- Siegmund in Die Walküre (Bayreuth Festival on Tour in Osaka) 1967
- Walther in Die Meistersinger von Nürnberg 1963, 1969
- Tannhäuser 1966–67
- Siegfried 1969, 1976

In 1963, Thomas joined the roster of the Metropolitan Opera and went on to sing 109 performances of fifteen roles with the company, including all the major tenor roles of Wagner's work. Among the highlights of his career with the Met was appearing at the opening of the new Metropolitan Opera House at Lincoln Center, in the first performance of Samuel Barber's Antony and Cleopatra with Leontyne Price. He was awarded the Wagner Medal at Bayreuth in 1963.

In 1970, at the 12th Annual Grammy Awards, Thomas won a Grammy Award for Best Opera Recording for his performance of Wagner's Siegfried, with the Berlin Philharmonic.

On December 9, 1981, San Francisco Opera general director Kurt Herbert Adler called Thomas an hour before a performance of Die Walküre. Heldentenor James King had lost his voice, and Adler asked Thomas if he would like to sing the role in an hour. "But I haven't even shaved yet", Thomas said. Though he hadn't looked at the score in years, Thomas performed the role at the age of 54, relying on a memory of the role, with some prompting. The next day, headlines proclaimed Thomas's eleventh-hour rescue for Die Walküre. Thomas's farewell performance took place in the title role of Parsifal with the Metropolitan Opera in 1982, while it was on tour in Washington, D.C.

== Death and legacy ==
Thomas died in San Francisco in 1993, aged 66, of a heart attack. In 1997, on request of Thomas's widow, Violeta Thomas, the Austrian sculptor Hortensia Fussy made a portrait of Jess Thomas, showing him as Siegfried with his sword. The sculpture was donated to the Austrian Theatre Museum in 2002.
