= The Shoemaker's Prodigious Wife =

Play written by Federico García Lorca

The Shoemaker's Prodigious Wife (La zapatera prodigiosa), also known as The Shoemaker's Wonderful Wife and The Shoemaker's Prosperous Wife, is a play by the twentieth-century Spanish dramatist Federico García Lorca. It was written between 1926 and 1930, and first performed in 1930.

The play tells the story of a volatile relationship between a married couple, a 53-year-old shoemaker and his 18-year-old wife. The story follows the wife's struggle against her husband, the mayor, neighbours, suitors, and a "boy". The shoemaker and his wife are shunned in their society because they are different. The shoemaker leaves the wife. She is very sad and sorry. The mayor, young man in the sash and young man in the hat all swoop in as soon as the shoemaker leaves, trying to woo her. They all fail miserably. The wife stays loyal to the shoemaker. She has to open a cafe so that she has enough money to live on. The Shoemaker, tired of a life on the road, is sorry and comes back disguised as a puppeteer. He tells the wife he is sorry and she accepts him back happily and warmly.

The Shoemaker's Prodigious Wife features a poem, recited by the Shoemaker when disguised as a puppet-master. The poem provides a condensed version of the story of The Shoemaker's life.
