= Marga Höffgen =

German contralto

- Marga Höffgen, in the 1960s
- Born: 26 April 1921; Mülheim, Germany
- Died: 7 July 1995 (aged 74); Müllheim (Baden), Germany
- Education: Folkwangschule; Musikhochschule Berlin
- Occupation: Classical contralto
- Title: Kammersängerin
- Awards: Order of Merit

Marga Anna Johanna Höffgen (26 April 1921 – 7 July 1995) was a German contralto, known for singing oratorios, especially the Passions by Johann Sebastian Bach, and operatic roles such as Erda in Wagner's Der Ring des Nibelungen, performed at the Bayreuth Festival and Covent Garden Opera in London between 1960 and 1975.

== Career ==
Höffgen was born in Mülheim on 26 April 2012 into a merchant family to parents Friedrich Höffgen (1899–1944) and Maria née von Eicken (1898–1944). Höffgen was age 17 when she started studying at the Folkwangschule in Essen with Anna Erler-Schnaudt. Two years later, in 1939, she continued at the Musikhochschule Berlin with Hermann Weißenborn until 1942. In 1943, she was contracted by the Staatsoper Dresden, but did not start because she was pregnant with her second child.

She made her concert debut in Berlin in 1952. She was noticed internationally when she performed the alto part in Bach's St Matthew Passion in Vienna in 1955, conducted by Herbert von Karajan. She sang the alto part in Beethoven's Missa solemnis at the Proms with the BBC Singers and the BBC Symphony Chorus twice, in 1966 with the BBC Symphony Orchestra conducted by Antal Doráti, alongside Heather Harper, Alexander Young and Ernst Wiemann, and in 1970 with the Royal Concertgebouw Orchestra conducted by Eugen Jochum, alongside Elizabeth Harwood, Ernst Haefliger and Karl Ridderbusch.

Höffgen was identified with the role of Erda in Wagner's Das Rheingold and Siegfried, sung first in 1959 at Covent Garden in London, and repeated at the Vienna State Opera and the Teatro Colón in Buenos Aires until 1975. She appeared in this role at the Bayreuth Festival from 1960 to 1964 and from 1967 to 1975, and from 1964 to 1975 she also performed there as the First Norn in Götterdämmerung.

=== Personal life ===
In 1941, at 20 years of age she married conductor Theodor Egel (1915–1993) while still in Mülheim an der Ruhr. She had four children, Hans-Peter (1941), Martin (1944), Barbara and Thomas (1947). Martin Egel also became a singer.

Höffgen died in Müllheim (Baden).

== Recordings ==
During the 1950s and 1960s, Höffgen was a soloist in recordings of Bach's major works with renowned conductors, soloists, and ensembles. She recorded Bach's Mass in B minor with Karajan in 1953, with Elisabeth Schwarzkopf, Nicolai Gedda and Heinz Rehfuss. In 1954, she recorded the St Matthew Passion with conductor Wilhelm Furtwängler, Anton Dermota as the Evangelist, Dietrich Fischer-Dieskau as vox Christi, Elisabeth Grümmer and Otto Edelmann. In 1955 she appeared in the St John Passion, conducted by Fritz Lehmann, with Uta Graf, Julius Patzak, Gérard Souzay and Walter Berry. In 1965, she sang the contralto arias in the two famous Bach Passions with Eugen Jochum and the Concertgebouw Orchestra. She appeared in Bach cantata recordings in the series of Kurt Thomas, Fritz Werner and Helmuth Rilling. Her Proms appearance in 1966 in Beethoven's Missa solemnis conducted by Doráti was issued by the Doráti Society.

Höffgen recorded the role of Third Lady in Otto Klemperer's recording of The Magic Flute (starring Nicolai Gedda and Gundula Janowitz). She also appeared in his recording of Beethoven's Missa solemnis.

She sang the role of Erda in Wagner's Siegfried in the studio recording by Sir Georg Solti and the Vienna Philharmonic, with Birgit Nilsson as Brünnhilde and Wolfgang Windgassen in the title role.

In 1978, she recorded Requiem compositions by Max Reger, including his Hebbel-Requiem and the unfinished Dies Irae, with the NDR Chor and the North German Radio Symphony Orchestra, conducted by Roland Bader.

== Awards ==
In 1976, Höffgen was named Kammersängerin by the state of Baden-Württemberg. She received the Order of Merit First Class in 1988.
