= Philipp Wolfrum =

German conductor, musicologist and composer

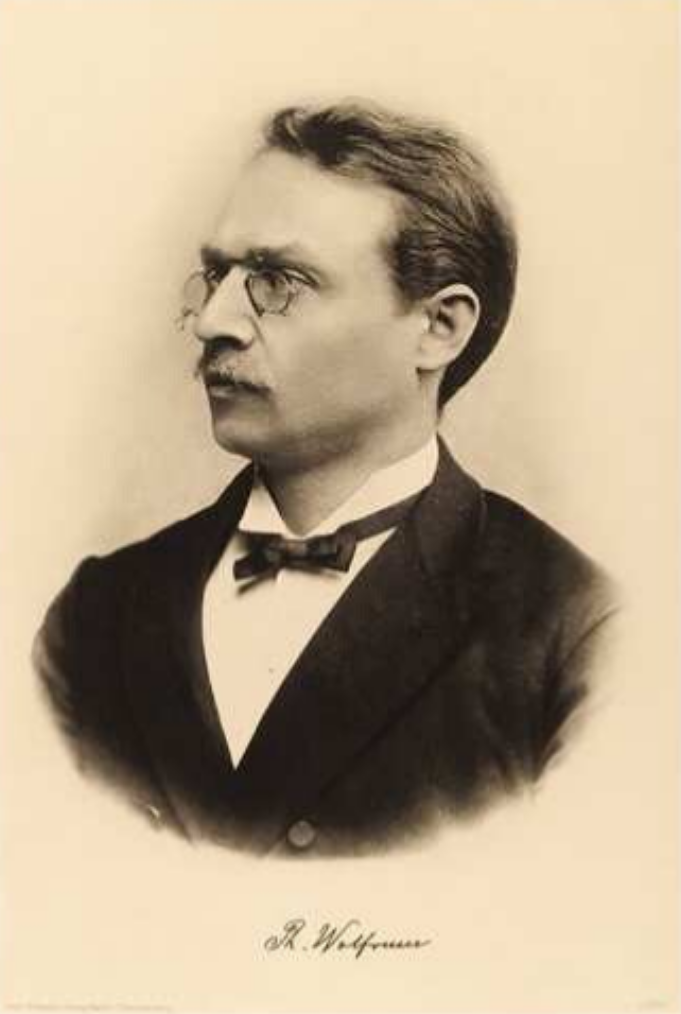
- Memorial in the Peterskirche in Heidelberg
- Born: Philipp Julius Wolfrum; 17 December 1854; Schwarzenbach am Wald
- Died: 8 May 1919 (aged 64); Samedan
- Education: Königliche Musikschule in München
- Occupations: Conductor; Musicologist; Composer; Academic teacher
- Organizations: Heidelberg University; Akademischer Gesangverein; Bach-Verein

Philipp Julius Wolfrum (17 December 1854 – 8 May 1919) was a German conductor, musicologist, composer, organist and academic teacher. He was influential to university education in church music in Heidelberg, and in 1907 became the town's Generalmusikdirektor.

== Career ==
Born in Schwarzenbach am Wald, Philipp Wolfrum was the son of Johann Heinrich Wolfrum, a teacher and church musician (Kantor). He first also worked as a teacher. On a scholarship, he studied from 1876 at the Königliche Musikschule in München organ and composition with Joseph Rheinberger, piano with Karl Bärmann, and choral singing and conducting with Franz Wüllner. From 1878 he was conductor, soloist and composer in Bamberg. In 1884 he was appointed an assistant teacher for music at the theology seminary of Heidelberg University. There, he installed formal education in church music, and initiated public musical events in the town. In 1885 he founded the choirs Akademischer Gesangverein and Bach-Verein (now: Bachchor Heidelberg). In 1888 he was appointed Außerordentlicher Professor. In 1890 he published Die Entstehung und erste Entwicklung des deutschen evangelischen Kirchenliedes in musikalischer Beziehung (The origins and initial development of the German Protestant hymn). In 1894 he was awarded the title of Universitätsmusikdirektor, and in 1907 became Generalmusikdirektor.

Wolfrum was a friend of Max Reger, who dedicated his choral work Der Einsiedler, op. 144a, to Wolfrum and his choir: "dem hochverehrlichen 'Bach-Verein Heidelberg' und seinem ausgezeichneten Dirigenten Herrn Geheimrat, Generalmusikdirektor, Professor Dr. Philipp Wolfrum" (to the praise-worthy 'Bach-Verein Heidelberg' and its excellent conductor, Geheimrat Generalmusikdirektor Professor Dr. Philipp Wolfrum). Wolfrum conducted the premiere of this work and of the Hebbel Requiem, op. 144b, in a memorial concert for Reger in Heideberg on 16 July 1916, shortly after the composer's death.

Wolfrum worked for the revival of the works of Johann Sebastian Bach and Franz Liszt. He published in 1910 a monography in two volumes Johann Sebastian Bach and was instrumental in the publishing of Liszt's complete works, publishing four volumes himself.

Wolfrum died in Samedan. An international competition for organists of the Hochschule für Kirchenmusik Heidelberg was established in his name.

== Selected works ==
- Drei Sonaten für Orgel, Op. 1, Op. 10, Op. 14
- Trio in B minor for piano, violin and viola, Op. 24
- Choralvorspiele Op. 25 and Op. 27
- Drei Tondichtungen, Op. 30
- Orgel-Requiem Klage und Trost
- Weihnachtsmysterium Op. 31
