= Roland Bader =

German conductor and choir director

- Born: 24 August 1938 (age 88); Wangen im Allgäu, Germany
- Education: Musikhochschule Stuttgart
- Occupations: Conductor; Academic teacher
- Organizations: Folkwang Hochschule; Toho Gakuen School of Music

Roland Bader (born 24 August 1938) is a German choral conductor and music director. He is the principal guest conductor of the Kraków Philharmonic Orchestra and the Opera Krakowska, officially authorized as representative for their guest performances in Germany and Switzerland. Since 1988 he is the visiting professor at the Toho Gakuen School of Music in Tokyo, where in 1989 he was awarded the distinction of the Professor Honoris Causa in Humanistic Disciplines.

== Career ==
Born in Wangen im Allgäu, Bader studied first church music in Rottenburg am Neckar, then at the Musikhochschule Stuttgart, organ, piano, viola and composition, with Johann Nepomuk David. From 1958 to 1965, he took private conducting lessons with Hans Hörner, conductor of the Stuttgart Philharmonic.

Bader was cantor in Böblingen from 1960 to 1967, and in Ludwigsburg from 1967 to 1970. He was the chief conductor of an orchestra at Oberhausen from 1970 to 1974, and served as director of the Folkwang Hochschule at Essen. Starting in 1974 he was the choral director of the choir of the St. Hedwig's Cathedral in Berlin.

Bader's artistic profile rose to new prominence in the 1980s when he served as chief guest conductor with the Krakow Philharmonic and choral director at Norddeutscher Rundfunk of Hamburg from 1983. He directed choral performances at the Salzburg Festival in 1984, and at the European Music Festival in Berlin with the production of Mahler's Eighth Symphony by the Basel Boys Choir. Bader made numerous recordings throughout the 1980s and 1990s, most notably, with the music of Kurt Weill, Ignacy Jan Paderewski, Joseph Joachim and others, including mainstream and the lesser-known 18th and 19th century masses by Mozart, Bruch, Beethoven, Bruckner, Weber, as well as Nicolai, Suppé, and Donizetti. He recorded rarely performed works, for example in 1979 late choral works by Max Reger, including his Requiem ("Seele, vergiß nicht die Toten", after Hebbel), Op. 144b, and Lateinisches Requiem (Latin Requiem), Op. 145, both with choir and orchestra of the Norddeutscher Rundfunk, and in 1994 the First Symphony by Richard Wetz with the Cracow Philharmonic.

== Recordings ==
- 1979 Max Reger: Requiem, Op. 144b; Lateinisches Requiem, Op. 145a; Dies irae, Marga Höffgen, North German Radio Choir and Symphony Orchestra, Koch Schwann
- 1986 Mozart: Missa brevis K. 65 & K. 258; Missa longa K. 262 "Piccolomini-Messe", Koch Schwann
- 1990 Mozart: Requiem, Vox
- 1993 Henryk Górecki: Symphony No. 1; Chorus I; Three Pieces in the Old Style, Koch Schwann
- 1994 Haydn: Die Schöpfung, Laserlight
- 1995 Bruckner: Te Deum; Gounod: St. Cecilia Mass
- 1996 Otto Nicolai: Te Deum; Motets, Koch Schwann
- 1996 Stanisław Moniuszko: Overtures & Dances, Koch Schwann
- 1997 Max Bruch: Kyrie, Sanctus & Agnus Dei, Op. 35; Damajanti, Op. 78; Jubilate, Op. 3, Koch Schwann
- 1998 Mendelssohn: Elias
- 1999 Joseph Joachim: Overtures, Koch International Classics
- Kurt Weill: Symphonies Nos. 1 & 2, Koch Schwann
- Mozart: Complete Works, Vol. 7 – Sacred Works, Disc 18, Brilliant
- Mozart: Complete Works, Vol. 7 – Sacred Works, Disc 19, Brilliant
- Richard Wetz: Symphony No. 1
