= Der Einsiedler =

Song composed by Max Reger

- Chorale composition by Max Reger
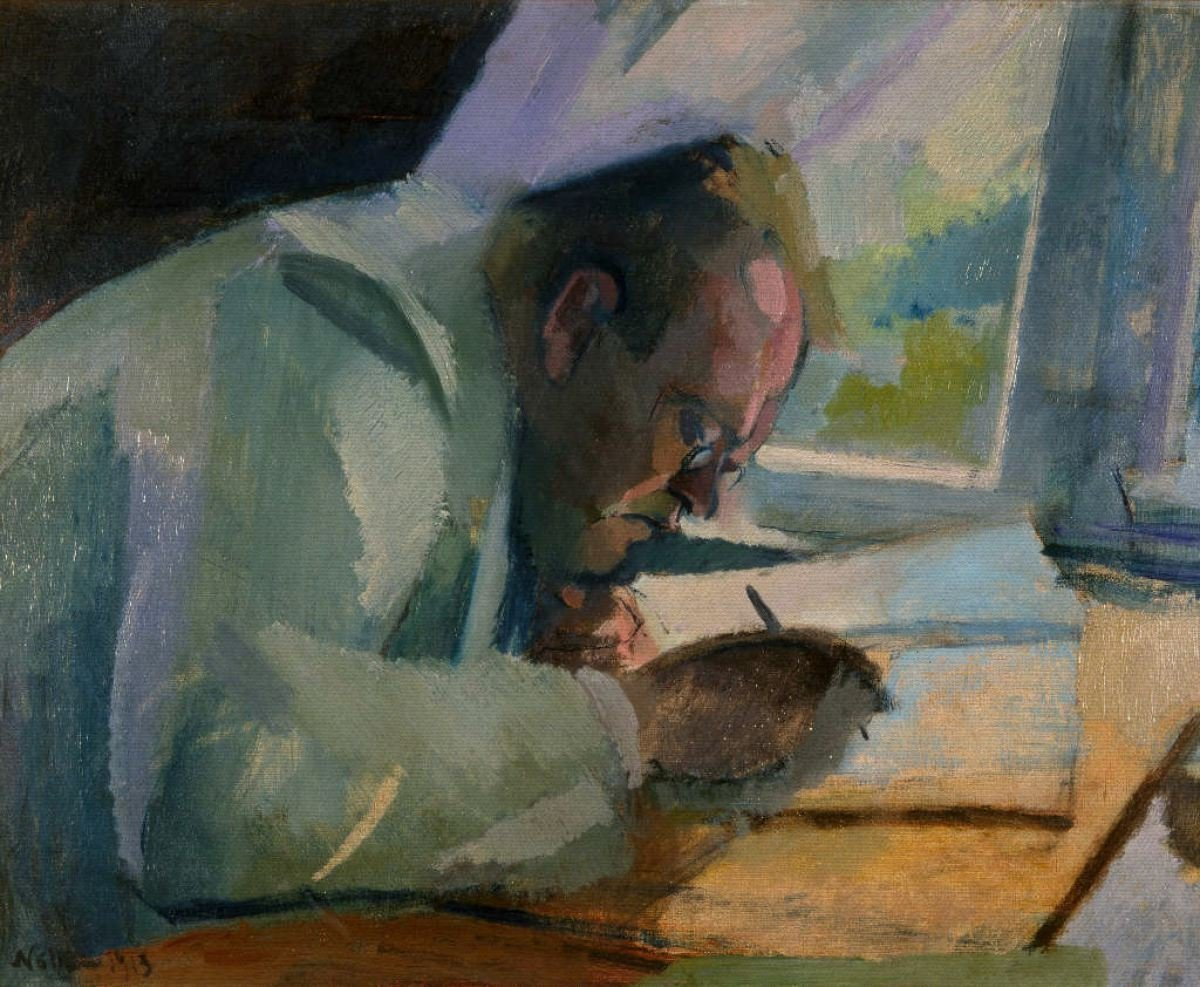
- The composer at work, a painting by Franz Nölken, 1913
- Opus: 144a
- Text: by Eichendorff
- Language: German
- Composed: 1915
- Dedication: Bach-Verein Heidelberg and Philipp Wolfrum
- Published: 1916
- Scoring: baritone; choir; orchestra

Der Einsiedler (The Hermit) Op. 144a, is a composition for baritone soloist, five-part choir and orchestra by Max Reger, written in 1915. The German text is a poem by Joseph von Eichendorff, beginning "Komm' Trost der Welt, du stille Nacht" (Come, consolation of the world, you quiet night). The composition was published in 1916 after Reger's death by N. Simrock, combined with the Hebbel Requiem, as Zwei Gesänge für gemischten Chor mit Orchester (Two songs for mixed chorus with orchestra), Op. 144.

== History ==
Reger composed the work in Jena, dating it 15 July 1915, setting a poem by Joseph von Eichendorff. He dedicated it to the Bach-Verein Heidelberg and its founder and conductor Philipp Wolfrum, writing "dem hochverehrlichen 'Bach-Verein Heidelberg' und seinem ausgezeichneten Dirigenten Herrn Geheimrat, Generalmusikdirektor, Professor Dr. Philipp Wolfrum" (to the praise-worthy 'Bach-Verein Heidelberg' and its excellent conductor, Geheimrat, Generalmusikdirektor, Professor Dr. Philipp Wolfrum).

Reger sent two works to the publisher N. Simrock, Der Einsiedler and Hebbel Requiem. He wrote to Simrock on 8 September: "I've finished two choral works (Der Einsiedler and Requiem). I think I can safely say that they're both among the most beautiful things I've ever written." ("Ich habe nun zwei Chorwerke (Der Einsiedler und Requiem) fertig. Ich glaube sagen zu dürfen, daß diese beiden Chorwerke mit das Schönste sind, was ich je geschrieben habe.") The two works were as Zwei Gesänge für gemischten Chor mit Orchester (Two songs for mixed chorus with orchestra), Op. 144. Reger himself had edited the piano version.

The Hebbel Requiem was first performed in Heidelberg on 16 July 1916, after the composer's death, as part of a memorial concert for Reger, with Rolf Ligniez, the choirs Bachverein and Akademischer Gesangverein, and the enlarged Städtisches Orchester (Municipal orchestra), conducted by Philipp Wolfrum.

== Lyrics ==
The German text is poem in three stanzas of six lines each by Joseph von Eichendorff. The poem was first published in 1837 in the anthology Deutscher Musenalmanach (German Musen-Almanach). The first stanza is based on the "Lied des Einsiedlers" (The hermit's song) from Grimmelshausens's Der Abentheuerliche Simplizissimus Teutsch (1669).

Komm' Trost der Welt, du stille Nacht!
Wie steigst du von den Bergen sacht,
Die Lüfte alle schlafen,
Ein Schiffer nur noch, wandermüd,
Singt über's Meer sein Abendlied
Zu Gottes Lob im Hafen.

Die Jahre wie die Wolken gehn
Und lassen mich hier einsam stehn,
Die Welt hat mich vergessen,
Da tratst du wunderbar zu mir,
Wenn ich beim Waldesrauschen hier
Gedankenvoll gesessen.

O Trost der Welt, du stille Nacht!
Der Tag hat mich so müd gemacht,
Das weite Meer schon dunkelt,
Laß' ausruhn mich von Lust und Not,
Bis daß das ew'ge Morgenrot
Den stillen Wald durchfunkelt.

A solitary person, forgotten by the world, addresses the night as consolation, reflecting tiredness of day, desire and need, and expecting an eternal dawn. The poem was set to music by other composers, such as a Lied by Robert Schumann, Op. 83, No 3.
