= Andrew-John Smith =

English musician

Andrew-John Smith is an English church musician, concert organist and conductor. Between 2008 and 2012, he recorded the complete organ works by Camille Saint-Saëns in three volumes. Since 1997, he has been director of music at St Peter's, Eaton Square.

== Biography ==
Smith studied at Oxford University and the Sweelinck Conservatorium in Amsterdam. He has been director of music at St Peter's, Eaton Square, in London since 1997. In that position he has held the Eaton Square Concerts.

Smith performed music by Josef Rheinberger with the National Musicians Symphony Orchestra at St John’s on Smith Square, and works by Francis Poulenc and Saint-Saëns with the English Chamber Orchestra. He has collaborated with the lutenist Elizabeth Kenny, the ensemble The Quintessential Sackbut and Cornett Ensemble, and Leslie Howard, among others. He has frequently performed with the countertenor Robin Blaze in recitals and broadcasts of for the BBC.

Smith recorded the complete organ works by Camille Saint-Saëns in three volumes between 2008 and 2012. He has been the conductor of the chamber choir Consortium, with whom he recorded works by Johannes Brahms (2009) and Max Reger (2010). Works by Brahms include besides the Zigeunerlieder an overview of his partsongs, Drei Quartette (Three quartets), Op. 64, Sechs Lieder und Romanzen, Op. 93a, Fünf Gesänge (Five songs), Op. 104, and Dem dunkeln Schoss der heil'gen Erde, WoO 20. The Reger collection contains his Der Einsiedler, Op. 144a (1915), Drei Chöre, Op. 39 (1899), Drei Gesänge, Op. 111b, Palmsonntagmorgen (1902) and Requiem Op. 144a (1916), with piano accompaniment. A reviewer noted that in the "surprisingly varied programme", "the intimate works "demonstrate the directness and simplicity that characterises much of Reger's music", while the music originally conceived for choir and orchestra "retains its symphonic grandeur even in this more intimate environment".

== Selected recordings ==
- Camille Saint-Saëns: Organ Music (2008–2012)
- Johannes Brahms: Zigeunerlieder (2009)
- Max Reger: Choral Music (2010)
