= Arthur Seidl =

German writer and journalist (1863 - 1928)

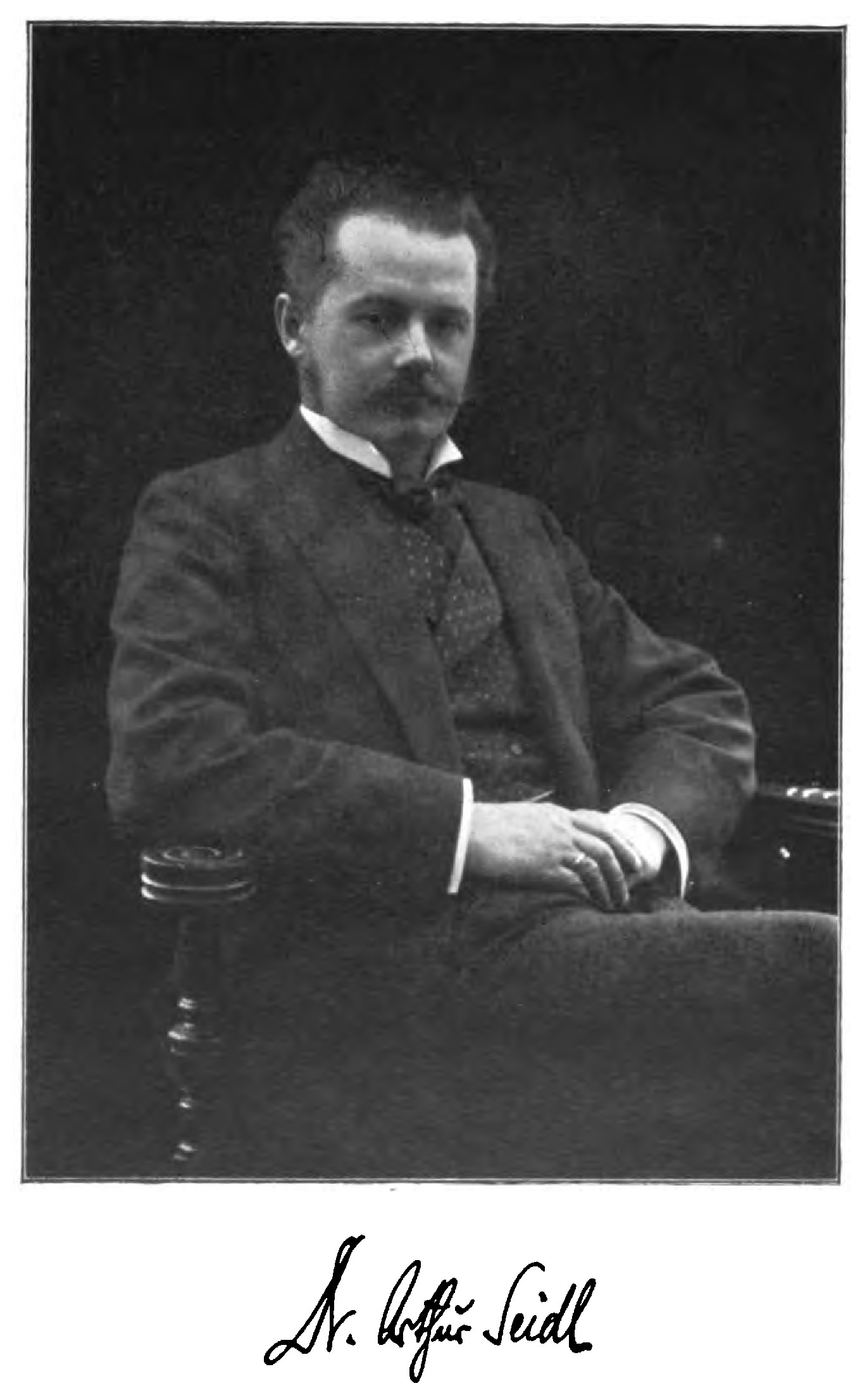
- Born: 8 June 1863; Munich, Kingdom of Bavaria
- Died: 11 April 1928 (aged 64); Dessau
- Occupations: Writer; Dramaturge; Conservatory teacher
- Organization: Anhaltisches Theater

Arthur Seidl (8 June 1863 – 11 April 1928) was a German writer, journalist, teacher at the Leipzig Conservatory and Dramaturg at the Hoftheater Dessau.

Born in Munich, Seidl studied at the universities of Munich, Tübingen, Berlin and Leipzig, completing his studies with a doctor's degree. During his studies, he also learned to play cello and piano in Munich and Regensburg, and was interested in composition.

Seidl worked as a journalist for papers such as Deutsche Wacht, Die Moderne, Münchner Neueste Nachrichten and Neueste Hamburger Nachrichten. From 1898 to 1899 he was at the Nietzsche-Archiv in Weimar and won a reputation as a Wagner scholar. From 1903 he was dramaturge at the Hoftheater Dessau (Dessau court theatre), a position he held until his death. From 1904 he was also a lecturer at the Konservatorium Leipzig.

== Selected works ==
- Zur Geschichte des Erhabenheitsbegriffes seit Kant (1889)

== Literature ==
- Ludwig Frankenstein: Arthur Seidl. Ein Lebensabriß. Bosse, Regensburg 1913
