= Reinhard Schwarz-Schilling =

German composer

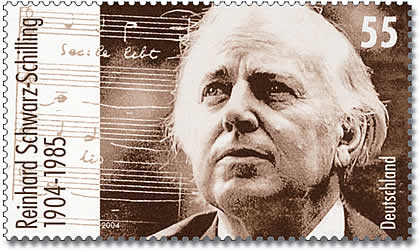
- Schwarz-Schilling on a German stamp issued for his centenary
- Born: 9 May 1904; Hanover
- Died: 9 December 1985 (aged 81); Berlin, Germany
- Occupations: Composer; Academic teacher
- Organizations: Musikhochschule Berlin
- Children: 2, including Christian

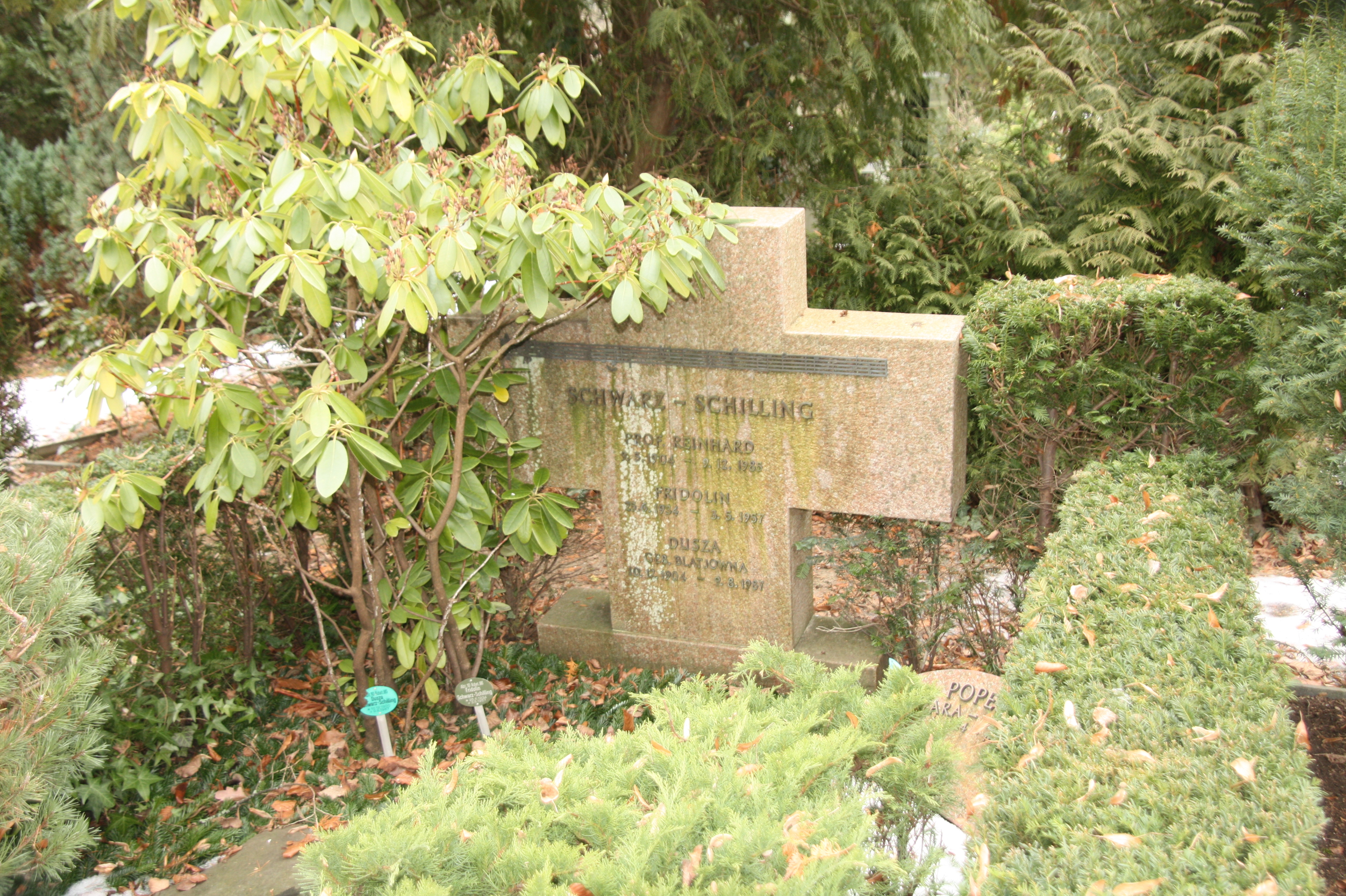
Grave at St Matthias cemetery in Berlin-Tempelhof

Reinhard Schwarz-Schilling (9 May 1904 – 9 December 1985) was a German composer and academic teacher.

== Life and career ==
Schwarz-Schilling was born in Hanover on 9 May 1904, the son of a chemical manufacturer. He embarked upon his musical studies in 1922, first in Munich and – interrupted by several extended breaks in Italy – from 1925 at the Musikhochschule Köln, where he studied composition with Walter Braunfels, piano with Philipp Jarnach, and organ with Heinrich Boell. From 1927 to 1929, he studied with Heinrich Kaminski, who also taught Carl Orff. In 1938, he obtained a teaching position at the Musikhochschule Berlin. One of his most prominent students was Isang Yun.

A devout Catholic, Schwarz-Schilling's music was often inspired by religious and spiritual themes. His tonal language follows the tradition of Johann Sebastian Bach and is strongly influenced by that of his teacher Heinrich Kaminski. His best known work is the cantata Die Botschaft (The Commission), composed between 1979 and 1982, although he also composed a wide range of orchestral, chamber and choral works. His Symphony in C major (1963), Sinfonia diatonica (1957) and Introduction & Fugue for string orchestra (1948) have been recorded for CD.

== Personal life ==
Schwarz-Schilling married the Polish pianist Dusza von Hakrid in 1929. Their son was the German politician Christian Schwarz-Schilling.

Schwarz-Schilling died in Berlin on 9 December 1985, at the age of 81.
