= Nikolaus Hillebrand =

German operatic bass-baritone (born 1948)

- Born: 1948 (age 76–77); Głuchołazy, Poland
- Education: Regensburger Domspatzen; Musikhochschule Köln; Musikhochschule München
- Occupation: Operatic bass-baritone
- Organizations: Bavarian State Opera

Nikolaus Hillebrand (born 1948) is a German operatic bass-baritone, who was engaged at the Bavarian State Opera, among others, and appeared at international festivals such as Bayreuth and Taormina. As a boy he was a member of the Regensburger Domspatzen, and returned to record sacred music with the group as a soloist.

== Career ==
Hillebrand was born in Głuchołazy. He was a member of the boys' choir Regensburger Domspatzen, the choir of the Regensburg Cathedral. He studied voice at the Musikhochschule Köln with Rolf Dieter Knoll, and at the Musikhochschule München with Hanno Blaschke. He was engaged at the Lübeck Opera from 1973 where he made his debut. From 1974 he was engaged at the Karlsruhe Opera, and from 1976 for several seasons at the Bavarian State Opera.

Hillebrand performed in 1973 the title role in Rossini's Mosè in Egitto in Israel. He appeared at the Salzburg Festival in Wagner's Die Meistersinger von Nürnberg and in concert. He performed at the Bayreuth Festival first in 1974 as Hans Foltz in Die Meistersinger von Nürnberg. In 1975 he performed additionally the parts of Fafner in Siegfried, a Knight in Parsifal, and the steersman in Tristan und Isolde. Hillebrand appeared as the Doctor in Alban Berg's Wozzeck at the Paris Opera. He appeared as Telramund in Wagner's Lohengrin at the Festival of Taormina in 1991.

In concert, he performed for example the bass solo in parts I to III of Bach's Christmas Oratorio at the Bachwoche Ansbach of 1977, with the Regensburger Domspatzen, Heiner Hopfner as the Evangelist, conducted by Hanns-Martin Schneidt.

Hillebrand has taught at the Richard Strauss Conservatory in Munich.

== Recordings ==
Hillebrand recorded in 1977 Bach's Christmas Oratorio with the Regensburger Domspatzen conducted by Schneidt. In 1979 he recorded the vox Christi (voice of Christ) in Bach's St John Passion with them, in an early production in historically informed performance. A reviewer noted the "aura of calm resignation" that he lend to the part. He recorded in 2009 the Requiem in C minor by Carl Ditters von Dittersdorf with Regensburger Domspatzen, conducted by Georg Ratzinger.
