= Christopher Glynn =

British pianist and festival director

- Born: 5 September 1974 (age 51); Leicester, England
- Genres: Classical
- Occupations: Pianist and festival director

Christopher Glynn (born 1974) is a British classical pianist and festival director. He is especially known for his work as an accompanist with many leading singers and for his work as Artistic Director of the Ryedale Festival.

== Biography ==
Born in Leicester to Roger and Judith (nee Flude) Hughes, Christopher Glynn read music at New College, Oxford and studied piano with John Streets and Malcolm Martineau at the Royal Academy of Music. He has one sister and three children.

He has subsequently performed in recital with singers including Sir Thomas Allen, Ian Bostridge, Claire Booth, Allan Clayton, Sarah Connolly, Lucy Crowe, Sophie Daneman, Bernarda Fink, Anthony Rolfe Johnson, Christiane Karg, Jonas Kaufmann, Yvonne Kenny, Emma Kirkby, Felicity Lott, Christopher Maltman, Ian Partridge, Joan Rodgers, Kate Royal, Nicky Spence, John Tomlinson, Bryn Terfel, Ailish Tynan and Roderick Williams.

Glynn also performs with many well known instrumentalists and chamber ensembles, and on period pianos and fortepianos with artists including Rachel Podger.

He has also performed and recorded as a pianist with The Sixteen, Voces8 and Eric Whitacre.

Glynn performs internationally, appearing at venues such as Wigmore Hall, Carnegie Hall , Royal Opera House, Aldeburgh Festival, Concertgebouw, Barbican, Southbank Centre, Vienna Konzerthaus and the BBC Proms.

He is especially noted for his Lieder in English initiative, longstanding collaborations with singers including Roderick Williams and Claire Booth, and a series of recordings of neglected English song composers. He has also curated concert series and festivals for the Wigmore Hall, Royal Academy of Music and the National Portrait Gallery

== Awards ==
Glynn was awarded the accompaniment prize in the 2001 Kathleen Ferrier competition, the 2002 Geoffrey Parsons Award, the Silver Medal of the Worshipful Company of Musicians, and the 2003 Gerald Moore Award.

In 2012 he won a Grammy for his performance on the Decca Light and Gold album with Eric Whitacre.

In 2021 Glynn was made a Fellow of the Royal Academy of Music.

== Ryedale Festival ==
Since 2010 Christopher Glynn has been Artistic Director of the Ryedale Festival, where he has been widely praised for the breadth and flair of his programming.

He has also championed the role that regional festivals can play on the wider artistic stage.

== Lieder in English ==
In 2015 Christopher Glynn initiated a Lieder in English project, reviving the art of translation to bring art songs and Lieder to a broader audience.

He commissioned Jeremy Sams to create new translations of Schubert's song cycles and later recorded them for Signum Records with singers including Roderick Williams, John Tomlinson and Nicky Spence.

Subsequent projects have included translations of Hugo Wolf's Italienisches Liederbuch and song cycles by Robert Schumann and Brahms.

The project was described by The Telegraph as ‘quietly daring yet superbly accomplished’ and by The Guardian as ‘an unusually direct Lieder experience’

== Recordings ==
- Schubert in English Vol. 4: with Rowan Pierce and Roderick Williams
- Schubert - The Fair Maid of the Mill: with Nicky Spence
- Schubert - Swansong: with Sir John Tomlinson, Sophie Bevan, Julian Bliss and Alec Frank-Gemmill
- Schubert - Winter Journey: with Roderick Williams
- Mozart Violin Sonatas: with Rachel Podger
- Beethoven Violin Sonatas: with Rachel Podger
- Mussorgsky - Unorthodox Music: with Claire Booth
- Grieg - Lyric Music: with Claire Booth
- Grainger - Folk Music: with Claire Booth
- The songs of Donald Swann: with Felicity Lott, Kathryn Rudge, John Mark Ainsley and Roderick Williams
- Home: with Eric Whitacre and VOCES8
- Songs by Eric Coates: with Kathryn Rudge
- Songs by Hamilton Harty: with Kathryn Rudge
- The songs of Elgar: with Julia Sitkovetsky
- Martin Suckling - The Tuning: with Marta Fontanals-Simmons
- The Peasant Poet: with Ailish Tynan, Katie Bray, James Gilchrist and Roderick Williams
- The Distances Between: with Ailish Tynan, Katie Bray and Marcus Farnsworth
- Songs of Michael Head: with Ailish Tynan, Catherine Wyn Rogers, Roderick Williams (Hyperion CDA67899)
- Brahms: Zigeunerlieder with Consortium and Andrew-John Smith (Hyperion CDA67775)
- Reger: Choral Music with Consortium and Andrew-John Smith (Hyperion CDA67762)
- Brahms: Ein Deutsches Requiem with The Sixteen (COR16050)
- The Ancient Question: with Hila Plitmann and Julian Bliss and Andras Kaljusutes (Signum SIGCD276)
- Light and Gold: with Eric Whitacre and the Eric Whitacre singers (Decca)
