= NDR Elbphilharmonie Orchestra =

German radio orchestra

- Radio orchestra
- Native name: NDR Elbphilharmonie Orchester
- Former name: NWDR Sinfonieorchester
- Founded: 1945
- Location: Rothenbaumchaussee 132; 20149 Hamburg, Germany
- Concert hall: Elbphilharmonie
- Principal conductor: Alan Gilbert
- Website: ndr.de

The NDR Elbphilharmonie Orchestra (German: NDR Elbphilharmonie Orchester) is a German radio orchestra. Affiliated with the Norddeutscher Rundfunk (NDR; North German Broadcasting), the orchestra is based at the Elbphilharmonie in Hamburg, Germany. Earlier the ensemble was called the NDR Symphony Orchestra (Sinfonieorchester des Norddeutschen Rundfunks), and was also known in English as the North German Radio Symphony Orchestra.

== History ==
British occupation authorities founded the orchestra after World War II as part of Radio Hamburg (NWDR), which was the only radio station in what would become West Germany not destroyed during the war. The first musicians came mostly from the ranks of the old Nazi-controlled Großes Rundfunkorchester des Reichssenders Hamburg. Hans Schmidt-Isserstedt, who was living near Hamburg, was given the task of assembling the members, something he accomplished over a period of six months. Schmidt-Isserstedt conducted the orchestra's first concert in November 1945, with Yehudi Menuhin as soloist. Schmidt-Isserstedt served as the first chief conductor of the orchestra, through 1971.

The orchestra first visited the UK in 1951, as part of the concerts celebrating the re-opening in Manchester of the Free Trade Hall. In addition to its performances of the core classical and romantic repertoire by composers such as Beethoven and Bruckner, the orchestra also has a focus on contemporary works by Bernd Alois Zimmermann, Wolfgang Rihm and Hans Werner Henze. It rose to particular significance during the chief conductorship of Günter Wand, from 1982 to 1990. Wand conducted several commercial recordings with the orchestra for the RCA Victor Red Seal and EMI labels. The orchestra has also recorded for the Deutsche Grammophon and CPO labels.

Thomas Hengelbrock became chief conductor of the orchestra with the 2011–2012 season, with an initial contract of three years. In January 2017, the orchestra took up its new residence at the newly opened Elbphilharmonie, and formally changed its name to the NDR Elbphilharmonie Orchester. In June 2017, the orchestra announced the scheduled conclusion of Hengelbrock's tenure with the ensemble at the close of the 2018–2019 season.

Alan Gilbert had served as principal guest conductor of the orchestra from 2004 to 2015. In June 2017, the orchestra announced the appointment of Gilbert as its next chief conductor, effective with the 2019–2020 season, with an initial contract of 5 seasons. He took the title of chief conductor-designate in the autumn of 2017. In December 2017, Hengelbrock expressed his displeasure with the timing of the announcement of Gilbert as his designated successor, within the same month as the original announcement of the previously scheduled conclusion of his tenure. Hengelbrock thus announced his intention to stand down as chief conductor of the NDR Elbphilharmonie Orchestra at the end of the 2017–2018 season, one season earlier than originally planned.

Other principal guest conductors of the orchestra have included Krzysztof Urbanski, who served from 2015 to 2020. In February 2023, the orchestra announced the extension of Gilbert's contract as chief conductor through the summer of 2029.

== Principal conductors ==
- Hans Schmidt-Isserstedt (1945–1971)
- Moshe Atzmon (1972–1976)
- Klaus Tennstedt (1979–1981)
- Günter Wand (1982–1990)
- John Eliot Gardiner (1991–1994)
- Herbert Blomstedt (1996–1998)
- Christoph Eschenbach (1998–2004)
- Christoph von Dohnányi (2004–2011)
- Thomas Hengelbrock (2011–2018)
- Alan Gilbert (2019–present)

== Awards ==
- 1998: Johannes Brahms Medal of the Free and Hanseatic City of Hamburg
- 2000: Award for best live performance in Japan
- 2014: Grammy for the category "Best Classical Compendium" (Hindemith: Violinkonzert – Symphonic Metamorphosis – Konzertmusik op. 50)

== Venue ==
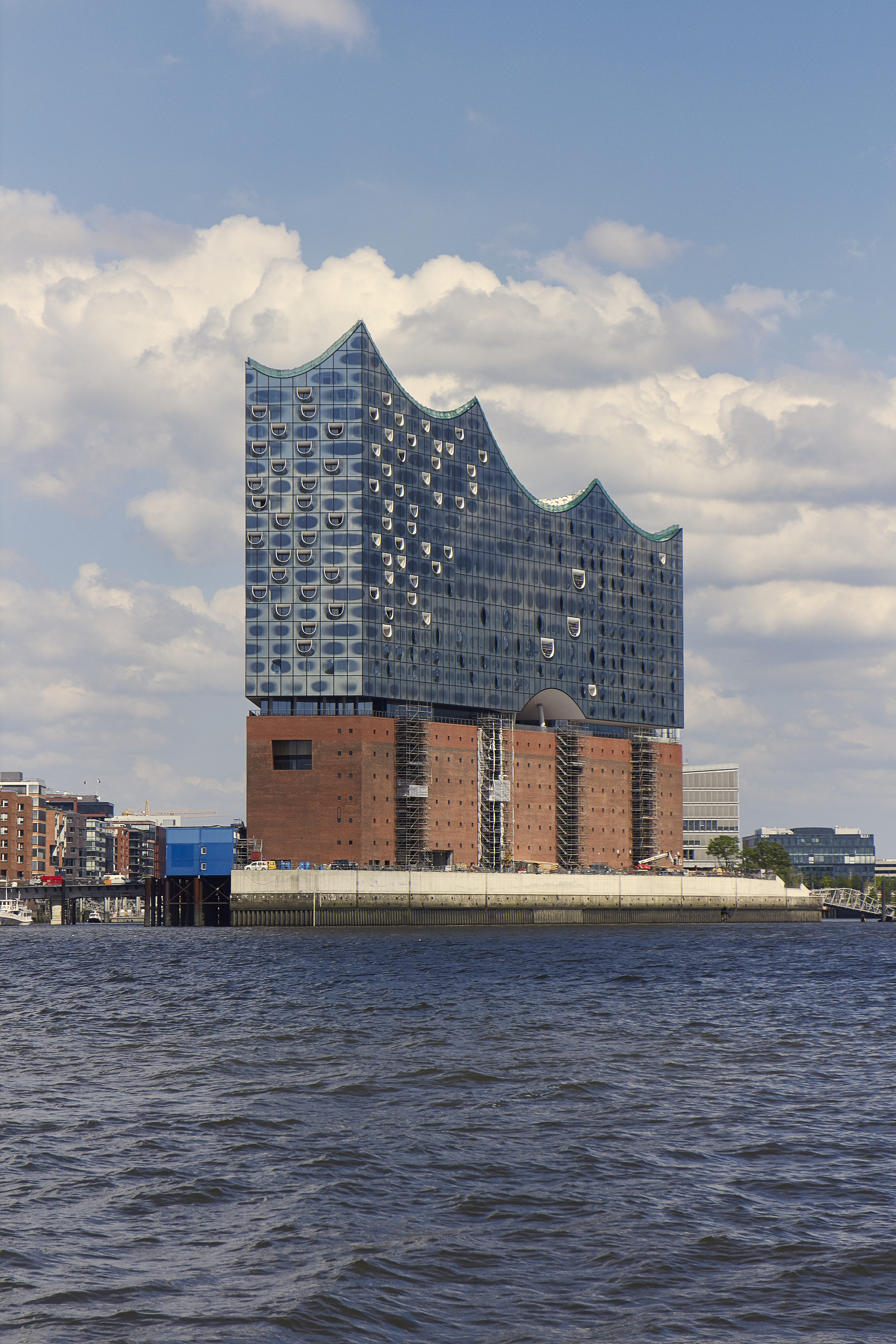
Elbphilharmonie

== See also ==
- Category:Music commissioned by the NDR Elbphilharmonie Orchestra (4)
