= Op. 35 =

In music, Op. 35 stands for Opus number 35. Compositions that are assigned this number include:

- Arensky – Variations on a Theme by Tchaikovsky
- Barber – A Hand of Bridge
- Beethoven – Eroica Variations
- Brahms – Variations on a Theme of Paganini
- Chausson – String Quartet
- Chopin – Piano Sonata No. 2
- Fauré – Madrigal
- Hába – Mother
- Korngold – Violin Concerto
- Madetoja – Symphony No. 2 in E-flat major (1918)
- Rachmaninoff – The Bells
- Reger – Sechs Lieder, Op. 35
- Rieding- Concerto in B minor for Violin and Piano Op. 35
- Rimsky-Korsakov – Scheherazade
- Rubinstein – Piano Concerto No. 2
- Schumann – 12 Gedichte
- Shostakovich – Piano Concerto No. 1
- Sibelius – Two Songs, Op. 35, collection of art songs (1908)
- Strauss – Don Quixote
- Szymanowski – Violin Concerto No. 1
- Tchaikovsky – Violin Concerto
