= In Haven =

Poem by Alice Elgar, set to music by Edward Elgar

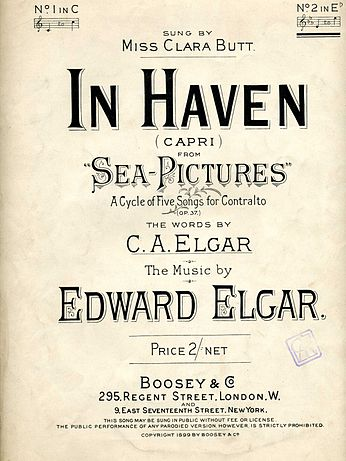

"In Haven (Capri)" is a poem by Caroline Alice Elgar, probably best known in its musical setting as the second (and shortest) song composed by her husband, Edward Elgar, for his song-cycle Sea Pictures.

== History ==
Elgar first set Alice's poem to music for voice and piano in 1897 and it was published in a cultural magazine The Dome in 1898, with the title "Love alone will stay". Alice then adapted it for Sea Pictures: she re-ordered the verses, included more allusions to the sea, and it was renamed "In Haven".

== Words ==
In Haven (Capri)
from Sea Pictures (Op. 37)

Closely let me hold thy hand,
Storms are sweeping sea and land;
Love alone will stand.

Closely cling, for waves beat fast,
Foam-flakes cloud the hurrying blast;
Love alone will last.

Kiss my lips, and softly say:
"Joy, sea-swept, may fade to-day;
Love alone will stay."

Love Alone Will Stay
as published in The Dome (1898)

Closely cling, for winds drive fast,
Blossoms perish in the blast,
Love alone will last.

Closely let me hold thy hand,
Storms are sweeping sea and land,
Love alone will stand.

Kiss my lips and softly say,
"Joy may go and sunlit day,
Love alone will stay."

== Elgar's setting ==
In the third verse, violins are added to the vocal line. It concludes with an upward scale on the violins and a pizzicato on the lower strings.

== Recordings ==
As well as the recordings listed in the Sea Pictures article, "In Haven" has been recorded by Robert Meadmore on the album After a Dream.
