= Cecil Court =

Pedestrian street with Victorian shop-frontages in London

Coordinates: 51°30′38″N 0°07′39″W

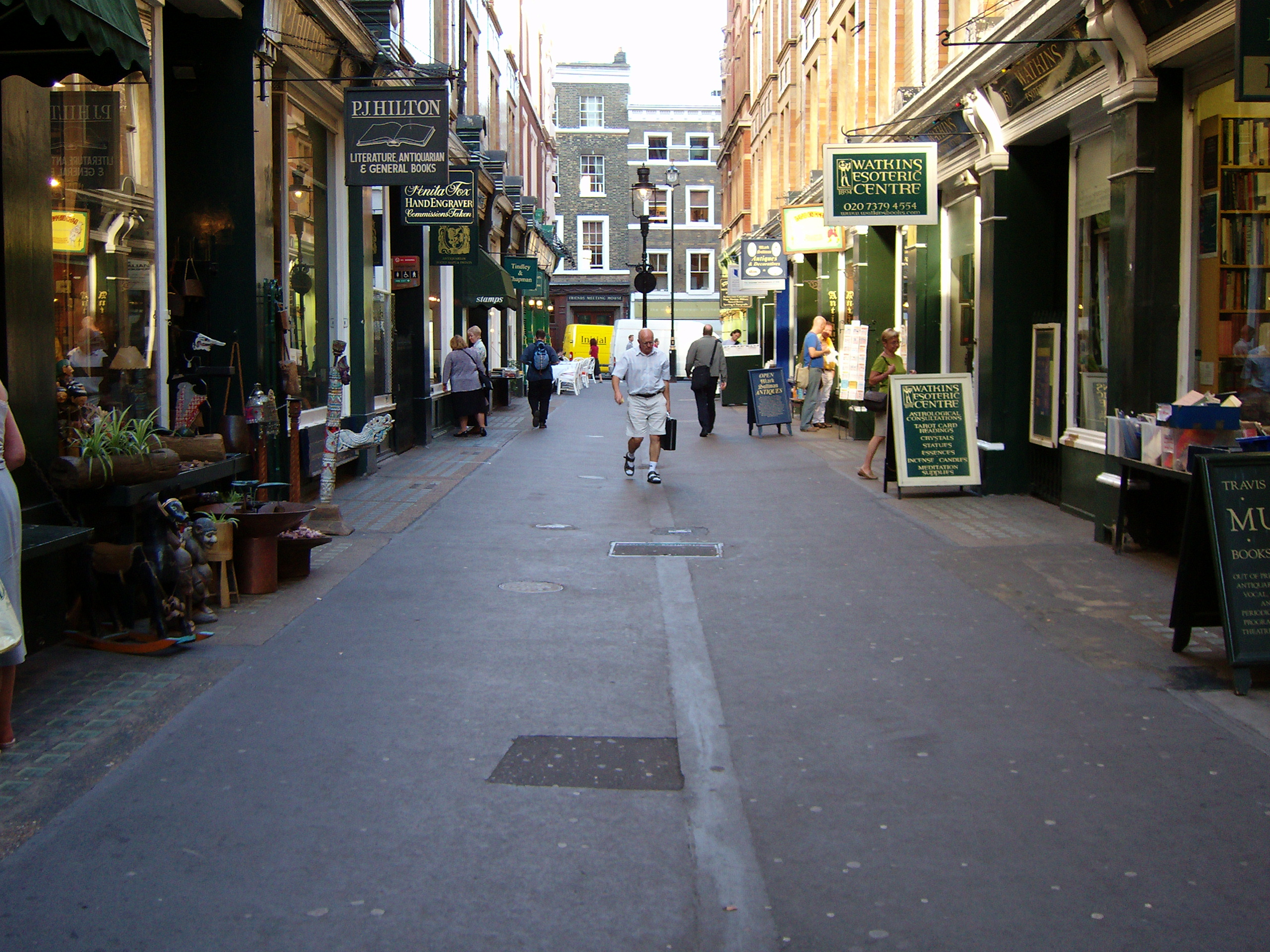
Cecil Court on a weekday afternoon, a photograph taken circa 2005.

Cecil Court is a pedestrian street with Victorian shop-frontages in Westminster, England, linking Charing Cross Road and St Martin's Lane. Since the 1930s, it has been known as the new Booksellers' Row.

== Early background ==
One of the older thoroughfares in Covent Garden, Cecil Court dates to the end of the 17th century and earlier maps clearly identify a hedgerow running down the street's course. A tradesman's route at its inception, it much later acquired the nickname "Flicker Alley" from the concentration of early film companies in the Court. It is now known as home to about a dozen antiquarian and second-hand independent bookshops, including specialists in modern first editions, collectible children's books, early printing, rare maps and atlases, antique prints, music, and esoterica, as well as art galleries, an antiques shop, shops specialising in antique silver, militaria, numismatics, porcelain, jewellery and art deco.

The street is sometimes nicknamed "Booksellers' Row"; an earlier "Booksellers' Row" existed at Holywell Street, London, demolished circa 1900.

It has been suggested that the street was named after Robert Cecil, 1st Earl of Salisbury, an important courtier to Queen Elizabeth I and renowned as a trailblazing spymaster. However, it seems to be one of a number of nearby streets and places that have been named after the land-owning family including Cranbourn Street and The Salisbury pub on St Martin's Lane.

A substantial part of Cecil Court was razed to the ground in 1735, almost certainly arson on the part of a tenant, Mrs. Colloway, who was running a brandy shop/brothel in the street at the time: she purchased kindling, emptied her brandy barrels, over-insured her stock and made certain that she was drinking nearby with friends at the time the fire took hold. However, she was acquitted.

== Association with Mozart ==
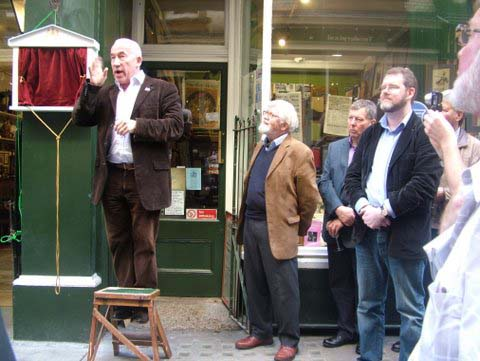
Actor Simon Callow unveiling the Mozart commemorative plaque in Cecil Court in September 2011

The street rose from the ashes to become the temporary home of eight-year-old Wolfgang Amadeus Mozart while he was touring Europe in 1764. For almost four months, the Mozart family lodged with barber John Couzin. Tickets for Mozart's first London concerts were sold from Couzin's shop and, while living there, the young Mozart performed twice for King George III and was tested for his musical ability by Dr. Charles Burney. According to some modern authorities, Mozart composed his first symphony while a resident of Cecil Court.

In September 2011, the Cecil Court Traders' Association installed a plaque commemorating Mozart's relatively brief, but significant, period of residence in the street. The plaque sits at Number 9 Cecil Court, which—contrary to earlier assumptions placing the Mozart lodgings at Number 19—has been confirmed as the site of John Couzin's barber shop. Cecil Court bookseller Tim Bryars consulted original source material, including the parish rate books of the time and a number of antique maps, to establish where in the street the young Mozart lived.

The plaque was unveiled by actor and author Simon Callow, who created the role of Amadeus on stage. The ceremony was accompanied with music from members of Opera Holland Park and the City of London Sinfonia including pieces from Mozart's London Sketchbook which it is quite possible might have been composed in Cecil Court.

== Flicker Alley ==
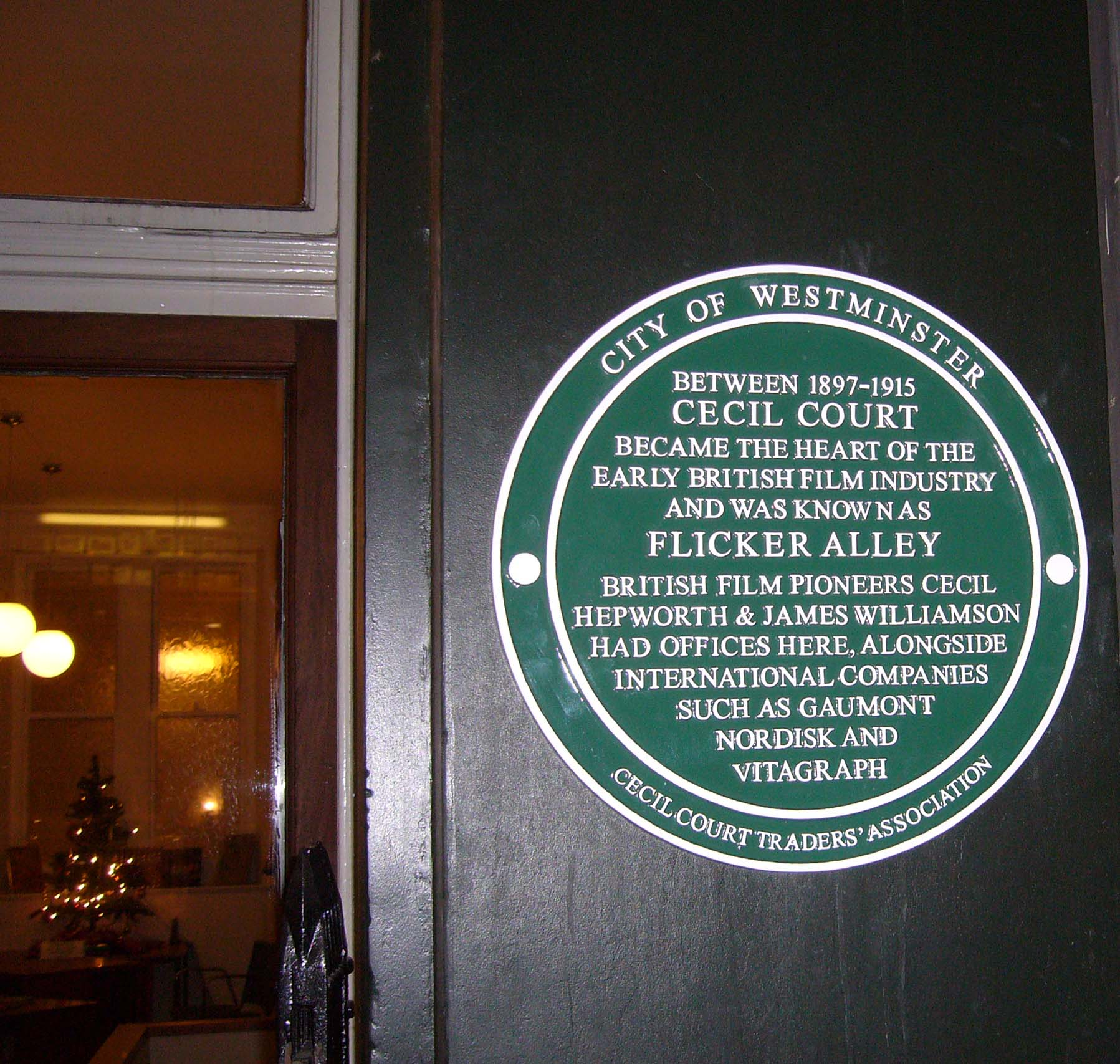
"Flicker Alley" plaque in Cecil Court

Cecil Court was an important focus of the early British cinema industry, with over forty entries to be found in the database of the study of the film business in London, 1894–1914, organised by the AHRB Centre for British Film and Television Studies, searchable online as part of the London Project. Arising from this, the street is sometimes called "Flicker Alley". The first film-related company arrived in Cecil Court in 1897, a year after the first demonstration of moving pictures in the United Kingdom and a decade before London's first purpose-built cinema opened its doors. The street was renowned as the place to buy or hire a film in Edwardian London, associated with many of the most important film-makers and distributors in early cinema. Home-grown pioneers including Cecil Hepworth and James Williamson had their offices there; but so did international companies including Gaumont, Nordisk, and American Vitagraph.

Cecil Court's importance has been frequently cited by filmmakers and historians. It was the location for the UK's first concentration of film-related businesses, which were almost exclusively new companies, bringing new skills to the industry and sharing products, resources, information and clientele (for example, dividing the costs of transporting the film reels themselves, and offering joint screenings to the showmen who hired them). The earlier businesses tended to be "one-stop shops"—filmmakers and dealers in films and equipment. From 1907, this new wave of businesses were often more specialised: dealers in the import and distribution of foreign films, or specialists in film rental or equipment alone. One business specialised in cinema confectionery, and for a time the trade periodical The Bioscope was published from number 8.

The US-based Flicker Alley home video and film distribution company, founded in 2002, is named as a homage to Cecil Court's history.

Simon Callow unveiling the 'Flicker Alley' plaque in Cecil Court in December 2012

In December 2012, Simon Callow returned to Cecil Court to unveil a plaque celebrating "Flicker Alley" and the street's significant role in the British film industry.

== Present-day ==
The street is still owned by the Cecil family and the buildings one can see today were laid out c. 1894 during the tenure of long-serving British Prime Minister Robert Gascoyne-Cecil, 3rd Marquess of Salisbury. Today, Cecil Court is part of the Jubilee Walkway (opened in 1977 as the Silver Jubilee Walkway). The nearest Underground station is Leicester Square.

== In popular culture ==
The street is sometimes used as a location by film companies. On film, Cecil Court bookshops feature in Victim (1961), The Human Factor (1979), 84 Charing Cross Road (1987), Miss Potter (2006) and Last Christmas (2019). Bookshops set in Cecil Court feature briefly in a number of novels, such as Ben Aaronovitch's Broken Homes.

Cecil Court is one of several locations which has been touted as an inspiration for Diagon Alley in the Harry Potter franchise. When asked directly in 2020, author J. K. Rowling denied that there is any connection: "I'm laughing here... I had no idea how many streets were claiming to be the inspiration for Diagon Alley... [it was not] based on any real place".

== Other information ==
- In 1776, Abraham Raimbach, the line engraver of "Village Politicians", "Blind Man's Buff", and others, after David Wilkie, was born in Cecil Court.
- The Aestheticist periodical The Dome was published at number 7 between March 1897 and July 1900.
- Watkins Books, the oldest bookshop in London to specialise in esoterica, has the longest continuous business history on the street, having occupied its current premises at 21 Cecil Court since 1901.
- Booksellers William and Gilbert Foyle, founders of the world-famous Foyles, opened their first West End shop at 16 Cecil Court in 1904, before moving to the current site on Charing Cross Road in 1906.
- In the 1930s, Cecil Court became a well known meeting place for Jewish refugees, which in 1983–84 inspired R.B. Kitaj to paint Cecil Court W.C.2. (The Refugees), a work now in the Tate Collection.
- In 1946, Griffs Bookshop, which specialised in Welsh writing in English and Welsh-language literature, was set up by William Griffiths and his brothers at 4 Cecil Court. William Griffiths was originally from Gilfach Goch, South Wales. Griffs Bookshop was a successful business and became prominent with Celtic scholars and writers such as Richard Llewellyn.
- In March 1961, Elsie Batten, a 59-year-old assistant in an antique shop at 23 Cecil Court, was stabbed to death. Her murderer, Edwin Bush, was identified and caught within days (he confessed and was hanged) following the circulation of identikit pictures—the first case to be solved using identikit in the UK.
- In 1983, the British commercial telephone directory company Yellow Pages filmed part of its famous Fly Fishing by J. R. Hartley advertisement in Cecil Court. The character was played by the actor Norman Lumsden.
- In 2006, Cecil Court was a location for the filming of Miss Potter, starring Renée Zellweger and Ewan McGregor.
- In July 2010, Tenderpixel Gallery organised the Flicker Alley Festival in Cecil Court, which celebrated the heritage of early British cinema. Vinyl stickers in the style of blue heritage plaques were put on shop windows across the court, indicating which productions companies were located in each address between 1900 and 1915. Several lectures were organised, and the first Alice in Wonderland film (Hepworth, 1903) was screened in Tenderpixel Gallery with live musical accompaniment.
- Cecil Court appeared in the 1 December 2010 episode of The Apprentice.

== Gallery ==
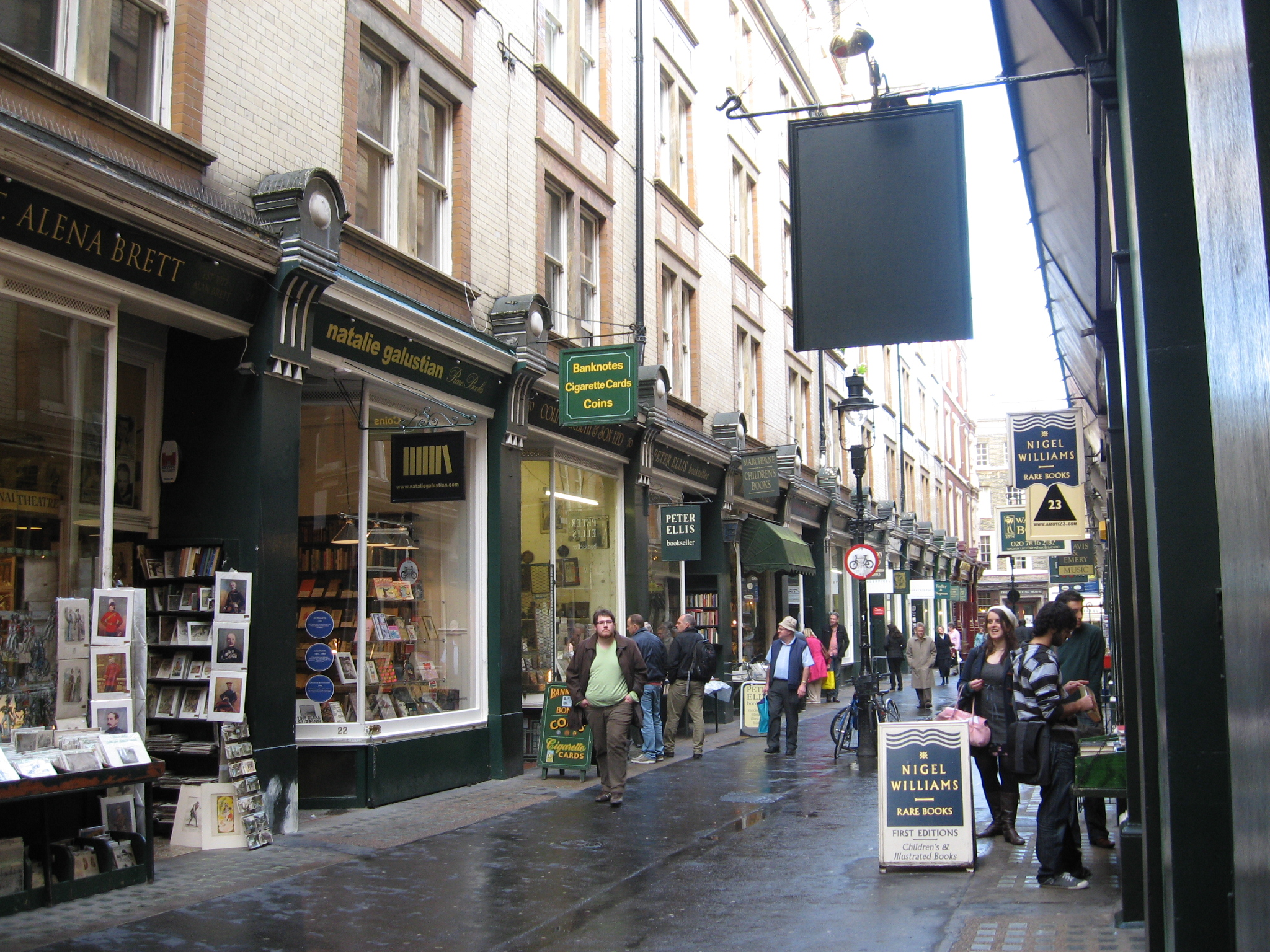
Cecil Court from Charing Cross Road probably circa 2010; Stephen Poole's bookshop is being renovated in the foreground, and first editions specialist Nigel Williams died at the early age of 48 on Christmas Eve 2010.

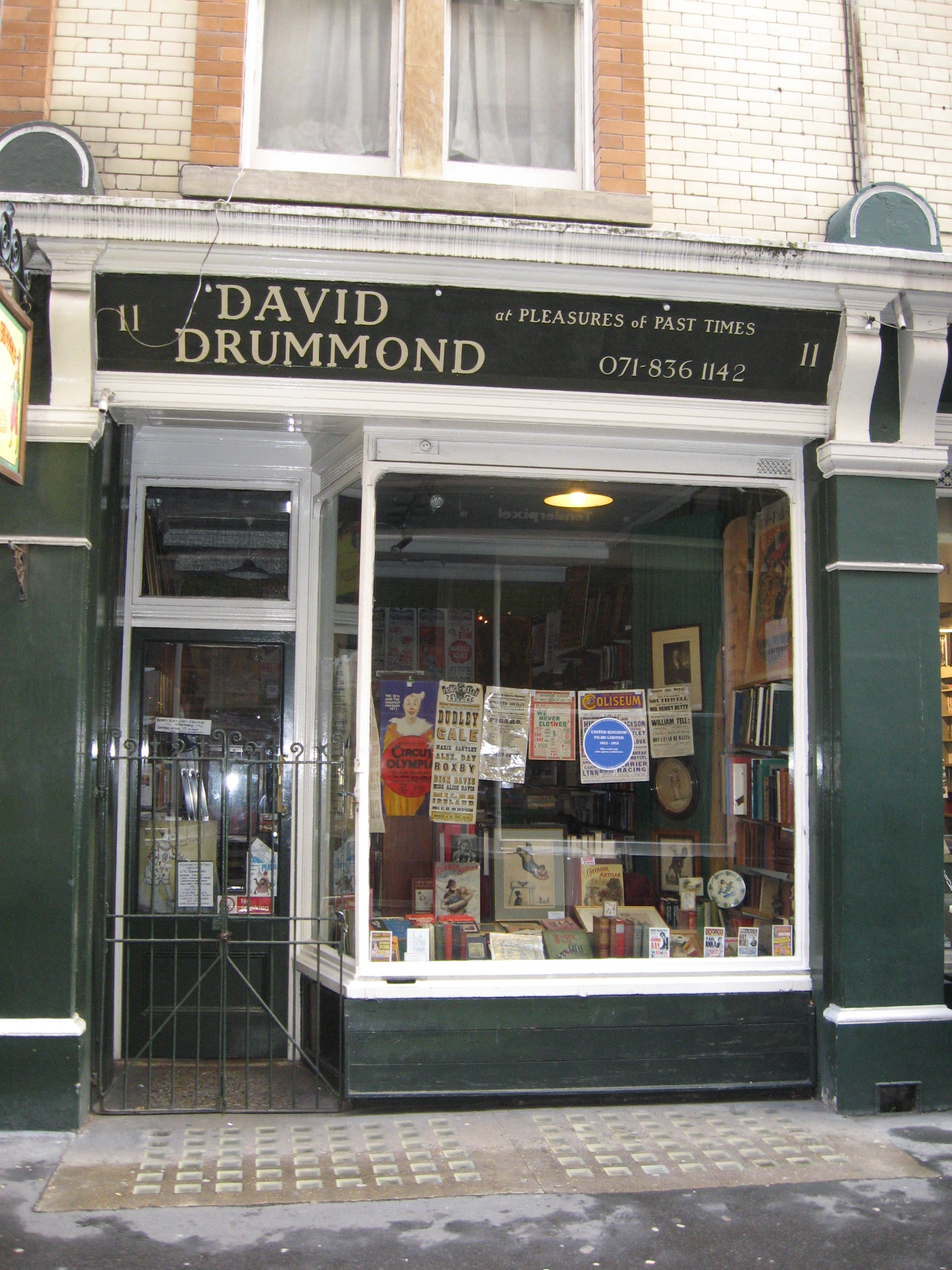
'Pleasures of Past Times', opened by David Drummond in 1967, who was for a time the longest-serving bookseller in Cecil Court. In later years it was run by his son Paul, and it closed in 2019. Currently (2023) Art Deco Gallery.

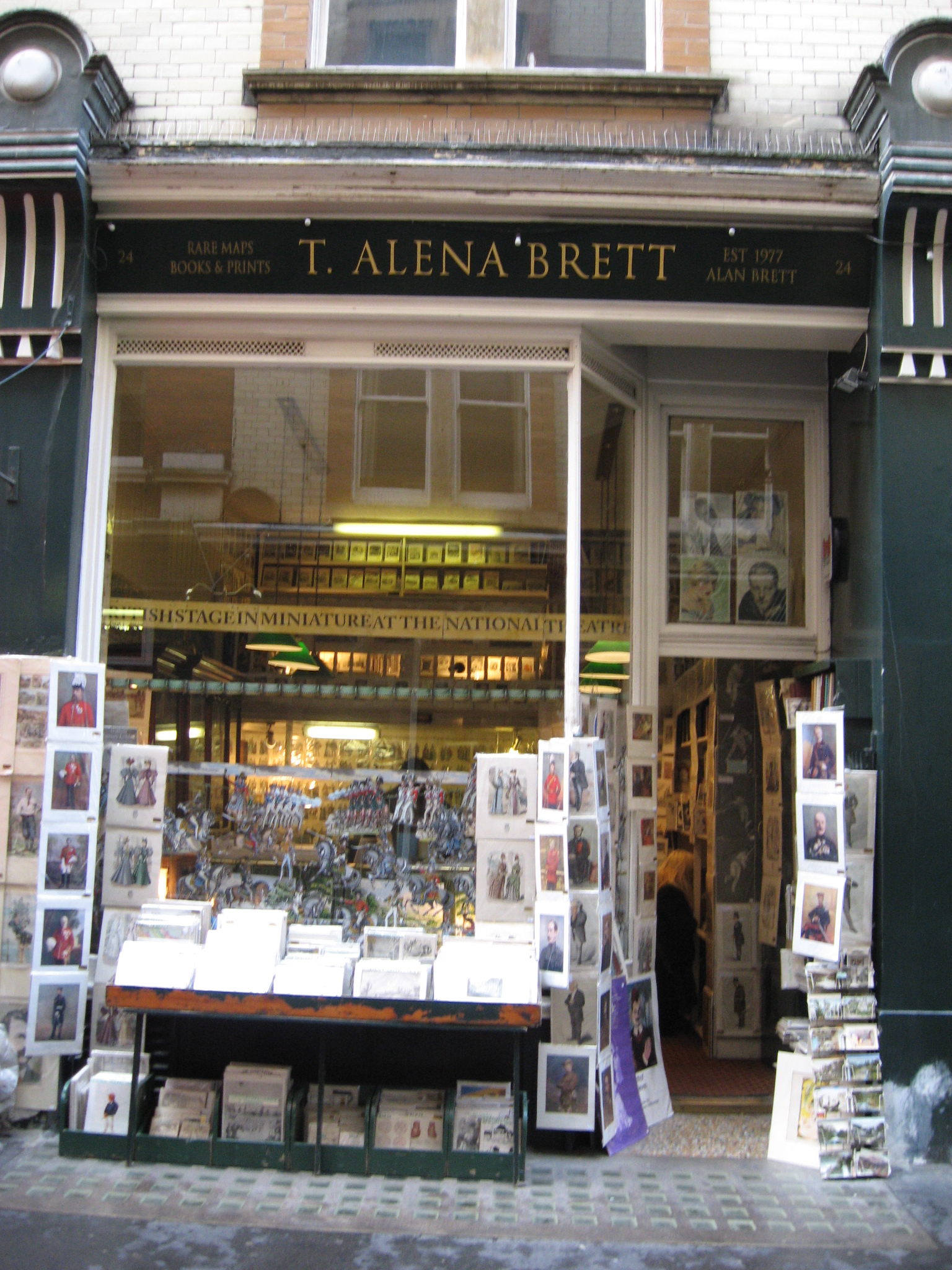
The print shop 'T Alena Brett', formerly 'Alan Brett', which closed circa 2015, currently (2023) part of Panter & Hall.
