= The Wind at Dawn =

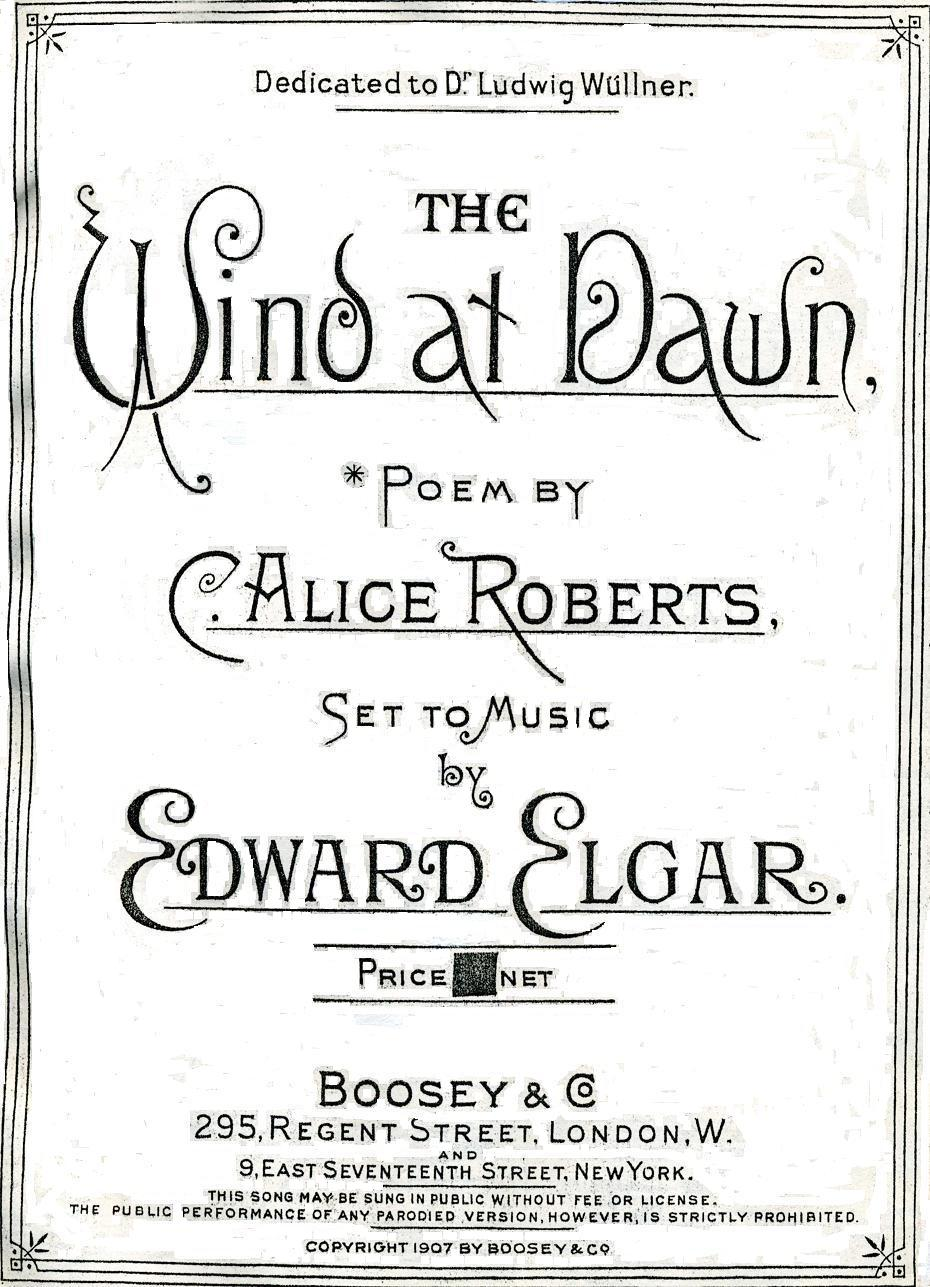

"The Wind at Dawn" is a poem written by Caroline Alice Roberts, and set to music by the English composer Edward Elgar in 1888.

== History ==
The poem was written in 1880 by Roberts before she had met Elgar, though they were married in the year after the song was written.

Roberts offered the poem to Edward when they were engaged, and such was the quality of the work that he put into it—the independent brilliant piano part, the voice in turn subtle and heroic—that it won the first prize of £5 in a competition organised by the publishers Joseph Williams. The song consequently appeared in the Magazine of Music of July 1888. Elgar in turn presented her with "Salut d'Amour" as an engagement present, and Jerrold Northrop Moore finds a resemblance in parts between the two works.

It was published by Boosey & Co. in 1907, when the dedication to the German tenor Ludwig Wüllner was added.

Elgar arranged the song for orchestra in 1912.

== Lyrics ==
THE WIND AT DAWN

And the wind, the wind went out to meet with the sun

At the dawn when the night was done,

And he racked the clouds in lofty disdain

As they flocked in his airy train.

And the earth was grey, and grey was the sky,

In the hour when the stars must die;

And the moon had fled with her sad, wan light,

For her kingdom was gone with night.

Then the sun upleapt in might and in power,

And the worlds woke to hail the hour,

And the sea stream’d red from the kiss of his brow,

There was glory and light enow.

To his tawny mane and tangle of flush

Leapt the wind with a blast and a rush;

In his strength unseen, in triumph upborne,

Rode he out to meet with the morn!

== Recordings ==
- Songs and Piano Music by Edward Elgar has "The Wind at Dawn" performed by Amanda Pitt (soprano), with David Owen Norris (piano).
- Rarely Heard Elgar Orchestral version of "The Wind at Dawn". Munich Symphony Orchestra with Douglas Bostock, on ClassicO label.
- Elgar: Complete Songs for Voice & Piano Amanda Roocroft (soprano), Reinild Mees (piano)
- The Songs of Edward Elgar SOMM CD 220 Christopher Maltman (baritone) with Malcolm Martineau (piano), at Southlands College, London, April 1999
