= The King's Way (song) =

Song
- Released: 1909

"The King’s Way" is a poem set to music by the English composer Edward Elgar in 1909. The words were written by his wife, Caroline Alice Elgar.

== Music ==
Elgar includes tunes from the Trio (central section) of the Pomp and Circumstance March No. 4, which he had composed two years earlier. The principal theme of the Trio introduces the song, and is first sung at bar 8 to the words "The newest street in London town,/ Who'll pace it up and pace it down?"

== Lyrics ==
The words, by the composer's wife Alice, employ the title with different meanings: as the name of the new street, "Kingsway"; as a royal processional avenue, the "King's Way"; and to show the sympathy of king and queen to the poor, "our King's way,- and our Queen's way."

== Kingsway ==
The song was written on 27 December 1909 to celebrate the opening of London's Kingsway, a wide street in central London connecting High Holborn to the centre of the crescent south of it called Aldwych. Kingsway had been opened in 1905, so it was then as in the words of the song "the newest street in London town", and it was certainly one of the broadest. It was built as part of a major plan to clear slum districts in the Holborn area, and hence the pertinent reference to "sick and poor" people. The song was immediately published by Boosey's and first performed at an Alexandra Palace concert on 15 January 1910, sung by Clara Butt.

== Arrangements ==
The song was published by Boosey's in 1910 as an arrangement for military band. The song was arranged for voice and full orchestra by John Morrison in 2022.

== Recordings ==
"The Unknown Elgar" includes "The King's Way" performed by Teresa Cahill (soprano), with Barry Collett (piano). A recording is also available on an SACD: Channel Classics Records CCS SA 28610 which is Volume 2 of the complete Elgar songs for voice and piano. It is sung by Amanda Roocroft with Reinhild Mees at the piano.
