= Sea Pictures =

Song cycle by Edward Elgar

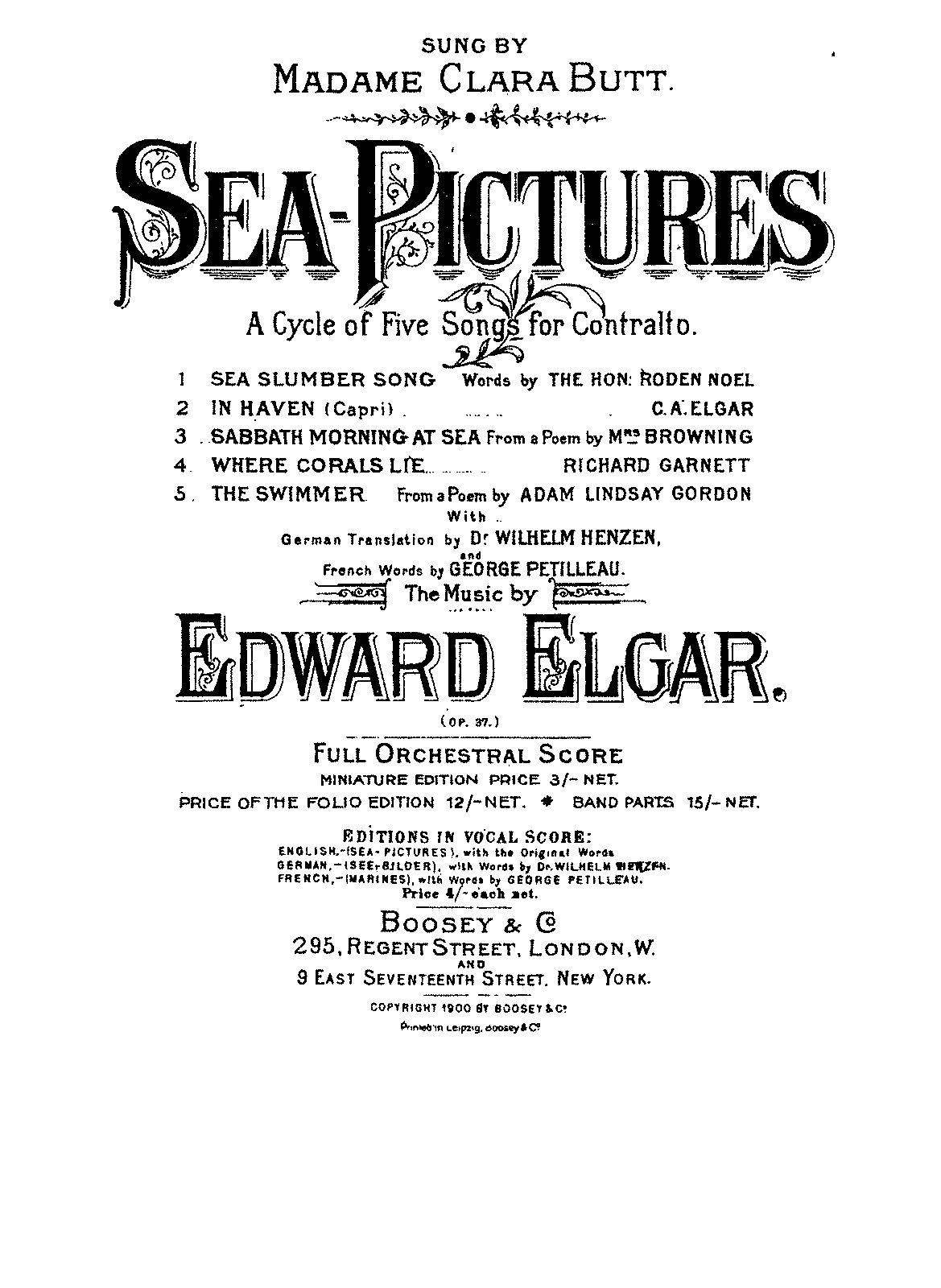
The 1899 Boosey and Co edition of Sea Pictures

Sea Pictures, Op. 37 is a song cycle for contralto and orchestra by Edward Elgar. It consists of settings of a poems by five different authors. It also exists in a version for solo voice with piano accompaniment. The songs are:

- "Sea Slumber Song" by Roden Noel
- "In Haven (Capri)" by Alice Elgar, the composer's wife
- "Sabbath Morning at Sea" by Elizabeth Barrett Browning
- "Where Corals Lie" by Richard Garnett
- "The Swimmer" by Adam Lindsay Gordon

== History ==
Elgar finished scoring his Enigma Variations in February 1899 and immediately began work on an orchestral song-cycle for the Norwich Festival that October. He composed the cycle around "Love alone will stay", a short song for voice and piano he had written some years earlier to words by his wife, Alice. She revised the poem to give it a maritime flavour and changed the title to "In Haven (Capri)". This became the second song in the cycle. Elgar then set four other poems to do with the sea, each by a different poet, in the manner of Berlioz's Les nuits d'été, and later favoured by Mahler.

The composer's literary taste in selecting the verse has been adversely criticised: his biographer Michael Kennedy has written, "Today these songs have only to appear in a programme for someone to castigate the words of the poems Elgar chose to set", and adds that so far as Elizabeth Barrett Browning's "Sabbath Morning at Sea" and Adam Lindsay Gordon's "The Swimmer" are concerned the criticism is justified. The music critic Andrew Farach-Colton describes these two poems as "creaky and overblown" and Roden Noel's 'Sea Slumber-Song' as "excessively alliterative" and "simply mediocre". Elgar took the view that it was preferable to set second-rate poetry to music, "for the most immortal verse is music already".

The premiere took place on 5 October 1899 at the Norfolk and Norwich Festival with Elgar himself conducting and Clara Butt singing, dressed as a mermaid. (Note: One reviewer reported: "Miss Clara Butt is an artist in dress as well as in music ... her dress at the Philharmonic concert on Tuesday was wonderfully in keeping with the cycle of songs she sang, Sea Pictures. Her dress, which was entirely composed of shimmering sequins, resembled nothing so much as the scales of a fish seen through green sea water, and . . . recalled paintings of mermaids. She was particularly fine in "The Swimmer", and you could almost imagine her breasting the waves, so marvellous was the effect of her singing, together with that of her dress.) The work was a success with the critics and the public. "The cycle went marvellously well", Elgar reported afterwards. The reviewer in The Musical Times wrote:

Mr Elgar is a master of broad and vigorous colouring, but in the cycle of songs entitled Sea Pictures (Op. 37), written for, and finely sung by, Miss Clara Butt, he has shown that he can also appreciate the style of the miniaturist. Indeed, I incline to think that in these five songs, whose words are taken from various sources, Mr Elgar has been the happiest in those he has treated with the lightest hand. "In Haven", with its constantly repeated figure of accompaniment, might be styled a trifle; but it is like the sketch of a master, better than the most highly finished productions of a laborious duffer. So is the even more beautiful "Where corals lie", with its quaintly Oriental turns of melody. Of the others, the "Sea slumber-song" is full of tender grace, while in the remaining two the composer has adopted something more like what Sir Walter Scott dubbed the "big bow-wow" style; with his accustomed skill, but with rather less convincing results.

Butt gave the first London performance two days later at St James's Hall, with Elgar at the piano. On 20 October Ada Crossley performed the work for Queen Victoria at Balmoral. Programmes at the Elgar Birthplace Museum document eleven performances between the premiere and June 1901. Soloists included Butt, Crossley, Muriel Foster, Gertrude Lonsdale and Helene Valma.

At the time he was composing Sea Pictures Elgar had temporarily fallen out with his usual publishers, Novello and Co, and he offered the new work to Boosey and Co, who bought the copyright for £50, with a royalty payment of 3d a copy for any of the songs published separately. They also secured the Cockaigne overture, and the Pomp and Circumstance Marches Nos. 1 and 2.

Elgar's music went out of fashion in the mid-twentieth century, and Sea Pictures fell out of the regular concert repertoire. The Record Guide, published in 1955, gives no recordings of the work among the sparse Elgar listings. The leading contralto of the post-war years, Kathleen Ferrier, did not like the work, although other singers performed individual numbers from it at five Henry Wood Promenade Concerts in the 1950s. The conductor Sir John Barbirolli continued to champion the work. He said to Kennedy, "He [Elgar] makes you see the sea lapping over the beach, you can almost feel the pull of the tide." It was his recording of Sea Pictures with Janet Baker and the London Symphony Orchestra made in 1965 and coupled with the Cello Concerto with Jacqueline du Pré that reintroduced the cycle to popularity.

== Recordings ==
The first recordings of "In Haven" and "Where Corals Lie" were made on 10 November 1922, by Leila Megane (contralto) with Elgar conducting the Royal Albert Hall Orchestra. The same artists recorded the remaining three songs on 8 January 1923. These acoustic recordings were made for The Gramophone Company and appeared under the His Master's Voice label, on two discs D674-5. The five recordings were reissued on CD by Pearl Records in 1992. Later recordings:

Soloist	Orchestra	Conductor	Year
Muriel Brunskill	unnamed orchestra	unnamed conductor	1926
Gladys Ripley	Philharmonia	George Weldon	1946
Gladys Ripley	London Symphony	George Weldon	1954
Constance Shacklock	Hallé	Sir John Barbirolli	1958
Janet Baker	London Symphony	Sir John Barbiroll	1965
Kerstin Meyer	Hallé Orchestra	Sir John Barbirolli	1970
Yvonne Minton	London Philharmonic	Daniel Barenboim	1977
Larisa Avdeyeva (Note: Sung in Russian)	USSR State Symphony	Yevgeny Svetlanov	1977
Lauris Elms	Sydney Symphony	John Hopkins	1978
Bernadette Greevy	London Philharmonic Orchestra	Vernon Handley	1981
Margreta Elkins	Queensland Symphony	Werner Andreas Albert	1983
Dame Janet Baker	London Philharmonic Orchestra	Vernon Handley	1984
Maureen Forrester	McGill Symphony Orchestra	Richard Hoenich	1986
Felicity Palmer	London Symphony	Richard Hickox	1987
Linda Finnie	London Philharmonic	Bryden Thomson	1991
Rosemarie Lang	Helsingborg Symphony	Hans-Peter Frank	1991
Birgitta Svendén	Orchestre philharmonique de Nice	John Carewe	1991
Della Jones	Royal Philharmonic	Charles Mackerras	1994
Jard Van Nes	Residentie Orkest	Yevgeny Svetlanov	1994
Elizabeth Campbell	Adelaide Symphony	Nicholas Braithwaite	2002
Catherine Wyn-Rogers	BBC Symphony	Sir Andrew Davis	2003
Sarah Connolly	Bournemouth Symphony	Simon Wright	2006
Roderick Williams	BBC Concert	Martin Yates	2010
Sarah Connolly	BBC Symphony Orchestra	Sir Andrew Davis	2014
Jennifer Johnston	BBC National Orchestra of Wales	Francesco Angelico	2015
Alice Coote	Hallé	Sir Mark Elder	2015
Elīna Garanča	Staatskapelle Berlin	Daniel Barenboim	2019
Marie-Nicole Lemieux	Orchestre National Bordeaux Aquitaine	Paul Daniel	2019
Kathryn Rudge	Royal Liverpool Philharmonic	Vasily Petrenko	2019
Dame Sarah Connolly	Philharmonia	Oliver Zeffman	2022

External videos
- A 1920 recording of No. 4, "Where Corals Lie" by Clara Butt

=== Recordings with piano accompaniment ===
- Birgit Finnilä, Geoffrey Parsons, 1975
- Claire-Louise Lucas, Jonathan Darnborough, 2002
- Konrad Jarnot Reinild Mees, 2007
- Amanda Pitt, David Owen Norris, 2007
- Amanda Roocroft, Reinild Mees, 2007

=== Other ===
- Version for SATB choir and string orchestra arr. Donald Fraser, Rodolfus Choir, English Chamber Orchestra, Kenneth Woods. 2013.
- Individual numbers from the cycle have been recorded by singers including Clara Butt, Aafje Heynis, Mary Jarred, and Maartje Offers.

== Notes, references and sources ==
=== Sources ===
- Anderson, Robert (2011). "Elgar and his Publishers". The Cambridge Companion to Elgar. Cambridge: Cambridge University. ISBN 978-1-13-900225-7.
- Kennedy, Michael (1971). Barbirolli, Conductor Laureate: The Authorised Biography. London: MacGibbon and Key. ISBN 0-261-63336-8.
- Kennedy, Michael (1987). Portrait of Elgar (3rd ed.). Oxford University Press. ISBN 978-0-19-284017-2.
- Moore, Jerrold Northrop (1984). Edward Elgar: A Creative Life. Oxford: Oxford University Press. ISBN 0-19-315447-1.
- Sackville-West, Edward; Desmond Shawe-Taylor (1955). The Record Guide. London: Collins. OCLC 500373060.
