= Salut d'Amour =

1888 musical work composed by Edward Elgar

- by Edward Elgar
- Opus: 12
- Dedication: Caroline Alice Roberts
- Published: 1888

Salut d'Amour (Liebesgruß), Op. 12, is a musical work composed by Edward Elgar in 1888, originally written for violin and piano.

== History ==
Salut d'Amour (02:37)
National Library of Latvia

Elgar finished the piece in July 1888, when he was romantically involved with Caroline Alice Roberts, and he called it "Liebesgruss" ('Love's Greeting') because of Miss Roberts' fluency in German. On their engagement she had already presented him with a poem "The Wind at Dawn" which he set to music and, when he returned home to London on 22 September from a holiday at the house of his friend Dr. Charles Buck in Settle, he gave her Salut d'Amour as an engagement present.

The dedication was in French: "à Carice". "Carice" was a combination of his wife's names Caroline Alice, and was the name to be given to their daughter born two years later.

It was published a year later by Schott & Co., a German publisher, with offices in Mainz, London, Paris and Brussels. The first published editions were for violin and piano, piano solo, cello and piano, and for small orchestra. Few copies were sold until Schott changed the title to "Salut d'Amour" with Liebesgruss as a sub-title, and the composer's name as 'Ed. Elgar'. The French title, Elgar realised, would help the work to be sold not only in France but in other European countries.

The first public performance was of the orchestral version, at a Crystal Palace concert on 11 November 1889, conducted by August Manns. The first recording of that version was made in 1915 for The Gramophone Company with an orchestra conducted by the composer. As a violin-and-piano piece Salut d'Amour had been recorded for The Gramophone & Typewriter Ltd (predecessor to The Gramophone Company) as early as 1901 by Jacques Jacobs, leader/director of the Trocadero Restaurant orchestra. Auguste van Biene recorded a cello transcription in 1907.

== Legacy ==

"Salut d'amour" is one of Elgar's best-known works and has inspired numerous arrangements for widely varying instrumental combinations. There are also versions with lyrics in different languages, for example the song "Woo thou, Sweet Music" with words by A. C. Bunten, and "Violer" (Pansies) in Swedish.

Greystoke: The Legend of Tarzan, Lord of the Apes based on Edgar Rice Burrough's famous novel features "Salut d'amour" being played on a gramophone by Belgian explorer Phillippe d'Arnot and a band of British adventurers including the brutal hunter Major Jack Downing
