= Alice Elgar =

English author (1848–1920)

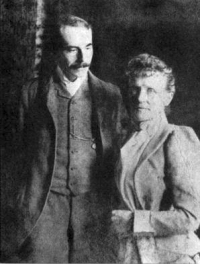
- Edward and Alice Elgar, circa 1891
- Born: 9 October 1848; Bhuj, Gujarat, British India
- Died: 7 April 1920 (aged 71); Hampstead, London, England
- Burial place: St. Wulstan's Church, Little Malvern, England
- Spouse: Edward Elgar (m. 1889)
- Children: 1
- Father: Henry Gee Roberts
- Relatives: Robert Napier Raikes (uncle)

Caroline Alice, Lady Elgar (9 October 1848 – 7 April 1920) was an English author of verse and prose fiction, who was married to the composer Edward Elgar.

== Family ==
Caroline Alice Roberts, known as Alice, was born in Bhuj, Gujarat, British India, in 1848. She was the youngest child (having three elder brothers) and only daughter of Major-General Sir Henry Gee Roberts KCB (1800–1860), and Julia Maria Raikes (1815–1887), daughter of Rev. Robert Napier Raikes (1783-1851). Alice's great-grandfather Robert Raikes (1736–1811) was the founder of the Sunday school movement, and her uncle was British Indian Army General Robert Napier Raikes (1813–1909). Her father was serving in India at the time of the Indian Rebellion of 1857, and he died when Alice was aged only 12.

As a girl she studied with the amateur geologist Rev W. S. Symonds and they and a group of her friends went fossil-hunting on the banks of the river Severn. She wrote the index to a book by him. She studied the piano with Ferdinand Kufferath in Brussels and harmony with Charles Harford Lloyd. She spoke fluent German, and also Italian, French and Spanish.

Before she was married her writing was published under the name C. Alice Roberts. A two-volume novel, Marchcroft Manor, was published in 1882, four years before she met Elgar. The Elgar scholar Diana McVeagh describes it as "quite an accomplished, entertaining, indeed touching tale, with a control of pace and situation, and a humour that might well surprise anyone knowing Alice only from her later verses, letters and diary". McVeagh also notes that earlier critics have drawn attention to the "tincture of radicalism" in the book.

== Marriage ==
In 1886 Alice Roberts' brothers had left to join the army and she was living with her elderly widowed mother at Hazeldine House at Redmarley in Worcestershire (now in Gloucestershire). That autumn she took up piano accompaniment lessons from Edward Elgar, who was violin teacher at Worcester High School. When her mother died the next year she went abroad for a while before returning to settle down at a house in Malvern Link called Ripple Lodge, and continued with her accompaniment lessons. She became engaged to her young teacher, much to the disapproval of her strongly Anglican family, who not only considered her fiancé a poor tradesman of a lower social class, but also noted that he was eight years her junior and a devout Roman Catholic.

Alice Roberts and Edward Elgar were married on 8 May 1889 in a shortened Catholic ceremony at Brompton Oratory in London. They gave each other engagement presents: he presented her with a short piece for violin and piano called Salut d'Amour, and she gave him one of her poems The Wind at Dawn. Of Alice's family only her cousin William Raikes and his wife Veronica attended, while on her husband's side there were only his parents and his musical friend Dr. Charles Buck. The wedding breakfast was at the nearby house of a friend of Alice's, Mrs. Marshall – Elgar later dedicated "A Song of Autumn" to her daughter "Miss Marshall".

The Elgars spent a three-week honeymoon at Ventnor on the Isle of Wight, then returned to London to be closer to the centre of British musical life. But they had no settled home for over a year: they went first to 3 Marloes Road, Kensington; then on 29 July they went back to her spacious house 'Saetermo' in Malvern when the lease ran out; then in October to the Raikes cousins' home (lent to them for the winter 1890–91) 'Oaklands', Fountain Road, Upper Norwood with the advantage of being near the Crystal Palace Concerts which Edward attended whenever he could. They then moved to a terraced house at 51 Avonmore Road, Kensington where their only child, Carice Irene was born on 14 August 1890. However the lack of work for Edward forced them to leave, and they returned to Malvern Link, renting a house 'Forli' in Alexandra Road, where it was hoped he could earn a living teaching and conducting local musical ensembles.

== Influence ==
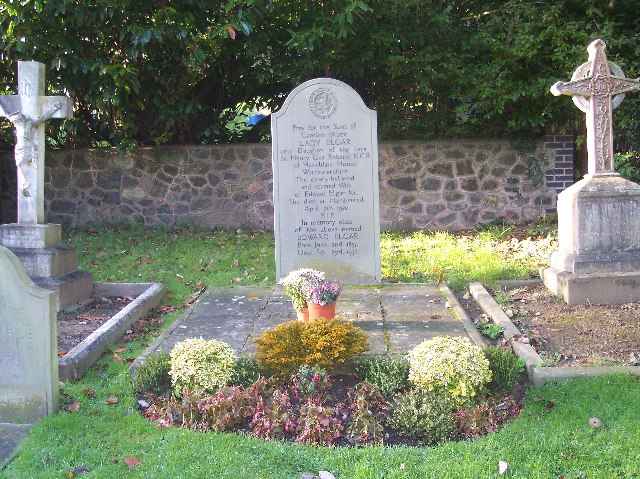
The Elgars' grave at St Wulstan's Roman Catholic Church, Little Malvern

Alice's faith in her husband and her courage in marrying 'beneath her class' were strongly supportive to his career. She dealt with his mood swings and was a generous musical critic. She was also his business manager, social secretary, and not least set out and ruled score paper for his orchestral works.

She did her best to gain him the attention of influential society, though with limited success. The honours accepted reluctantly by her husband mattered more to her and her social class. She also gave up some of her personal aspirations to further his career. In her diary she later admitted, "The care of a genius is enough of a life work for any woman."

When her husband received his knighthood in 1904, she became Lady Elgar.

At the beginning of World War I, for a short while, Lady Elgar taught French to a group of private soldiers at Chelsea Barracks.

By January 1920, friends had noticed that she had lost her normal vitality and had not been out of the house since November. She attended a performance of Elgar's Second Symphony on 16 March, and the next day went to a Harley Street doctor, but stayed at home when Elgar travelled to a concert in Leeds. The last concert she attended was a performance of some of Elgar's chamber music in London.

She died of lung cancer, aged 71, on 7 April, in their home Severn House at 42 Netherhall Gardens in Hampstead. Her funeral was held at St Wulstan's Roman Catholic Church in Little Malvern three days later. Edward was supported by their daughter Carice. Among the mourners was Alice's brother Napier Roberts. There were Elgar's friends Frank Schuster, Billy Reed and Dr. Charles Buck. Sir Charles Stanford arrived but could only speak to Reed before walking away in tears. In the gallery of the church the slow movement from Elgar's String Quartet was played by Reed, Albert Sammons, Lionel Tertis and Felix Salmond.

== Legacy ==
Alice's letters and the diary she kept during the years of her marriage between 1889 and 1920 are a valuable record of the lives of her and her family.

== Her daughter ==
At the beginning of World War I, Carice Elgar trained in First Aid, then from 1915 did translation work for the Government Censorship Department.

The month before Alice died, Carice returned home from a holiday in Mürren, having met there a Surrey farmer older than she was named Samuel Blake. Her mother sensed a secret, but Carice did not tell her. A year later, with her father's consent, they became engaged. They were married in January 1922 and she took the name Carice Elgar Blake. They had no children.

After her mother died Carice devoted herself to supporting her father. After the death of her father in 1934 she played a part in the formation of the Elgar Birthplace Trust. Samuel Blake died in 1939, and Carice died in Bristol on 16 July 1970 aged 79. Her funeral was at St. Wulstan's Church in Little Malvern, where her parents were buried, and there was a memorial service for her at Farm Street Church in Mount Street, London W1 on 30 July.

== Works ==
=== Lyrics ===
Poems by Alice set to music by Elgar:

- "The Wind at Dawn", song (1888), poem written in 1880
- "Afar, amidst the sunny Isles", alternate poem by Alice to fit the music of "My Love Dwelt in a Northern Land", when Andrew Lang refused permission for his poem to be used: but Lang later changed his mind and Alice's words were not used
- "Im Norden, wo mein Lieb gewohnt", German words to "My Love Dwelt in a Northern Land"
- "O Happy Eyes", part-song SATB, Op.18 No.1 (1890)
- "A spear, a sword", unpublished song (1892)
- "Mill-wheel Songs", two unpublished songs (1892)
  - 1. "Winter"; 2. "May (a rhapsody)"
- "The Snow", part-song SSA acc. 2 violins and piano, Op. 26 No.1 (1894). Winter from her poem Isabel Trevithoe.
- "Fly, Singing Bird", part-song SSA acc. 2 violins and piano, Op. 26 No.2 (1894). Spring from her poem Isabel Trevithoe.
- From the Bavarian Highlands, six choral songs SATB and orchestra, Op. 27 (1896). Alice also gave the songs their German subtitles.
  - 1. "The Dance (Sonnenbichl)"; 2. "False Love (Wamberg)"; 3. "Lullaby (In Hammersbach)"; 4. "Aspiration (Bei Sankt Anton)"; 5. "On the Alm 'True Love' (Hoch Alp)"; 6. "The Marksmen (Bei Murnau)"
- "Love alone will stay", song, (1898). Later in Sea Pictures, Op. 37 as In Haven (Capri)
- "A Christmas Greeting", carol for 2 sopranos, male chorus ad lib, 2 violins and piano, Op. 52, (1907)
- "The King's Way", song (1910)

=== Fiction ===
- Isabel Trevithoe, a poem by C. A. R., (The Charing Cross Publishing Co., 1879)
- Marchcroft Manor, a novel (2 vols.), (Remington & Co., New Bond St., London, 1882)
- Stories in the magazine Home Chimes
- Dear little ship, go forth, a poem, dedicated "To Carice"

=== Other ===
- Index to Records of the Rocks by Rev W. S. Symonds (1872)
- Translation from German of E. T. A. Hoffmann's short story Ritter Gluck, (London Society, a Monthly Magazine, May 1895)

=== Dedications ===
Dedicated by Edward Elgar to Alice

- "Through the Long Days", song, Op.16 No.2 (1887) – written on one of the first printed copies was 'Miss Roberts from Edward Elgar, Mar.21 1887'
- "Liebesgruss" (Salut d'Amour), violin and piano, Op.12, inscribed "à Carice" (1888)
- "Liebesahnung", violin and piano, later published as "Mot d'Amour", Op.13 No.1 (1889)
- "Love", part-song SATB, Op.18 No.2 (1890)
- Variation I of the Enigma Variations, Op.36 bears the initials "C.A.E." (1898)
