= Maartje Offers =

Dutch classical singer

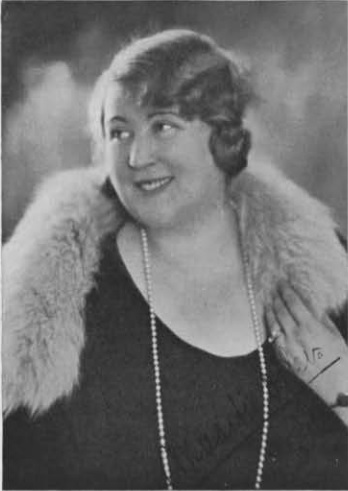
Maartje Offers

Maartje Offers (27 February 1891, Koudekerk (aan den Rijn) – 28 January 1944, Tholen) was a Dutch contralto classical singer.

== Recordings ==
- Het Puik van zoete kelen (The Cream of Glorious Voices) Philips Dutch Masters 464 385-2 Songs include "Where Corals Lie" from Elgar's Sea Pictures.
- Lebendige Vergangenheit Preiser Records 2916777
- Maartje Offers, contralto cd1: The Opera Recordings 1923-1927 - DDR 0703
- Maartje Offers, contralto cd2: The Lied & Song recordings, 1926-1930 - DDR 0704
