= Franz Wüllner =

German composer and conductor (1832–1902)

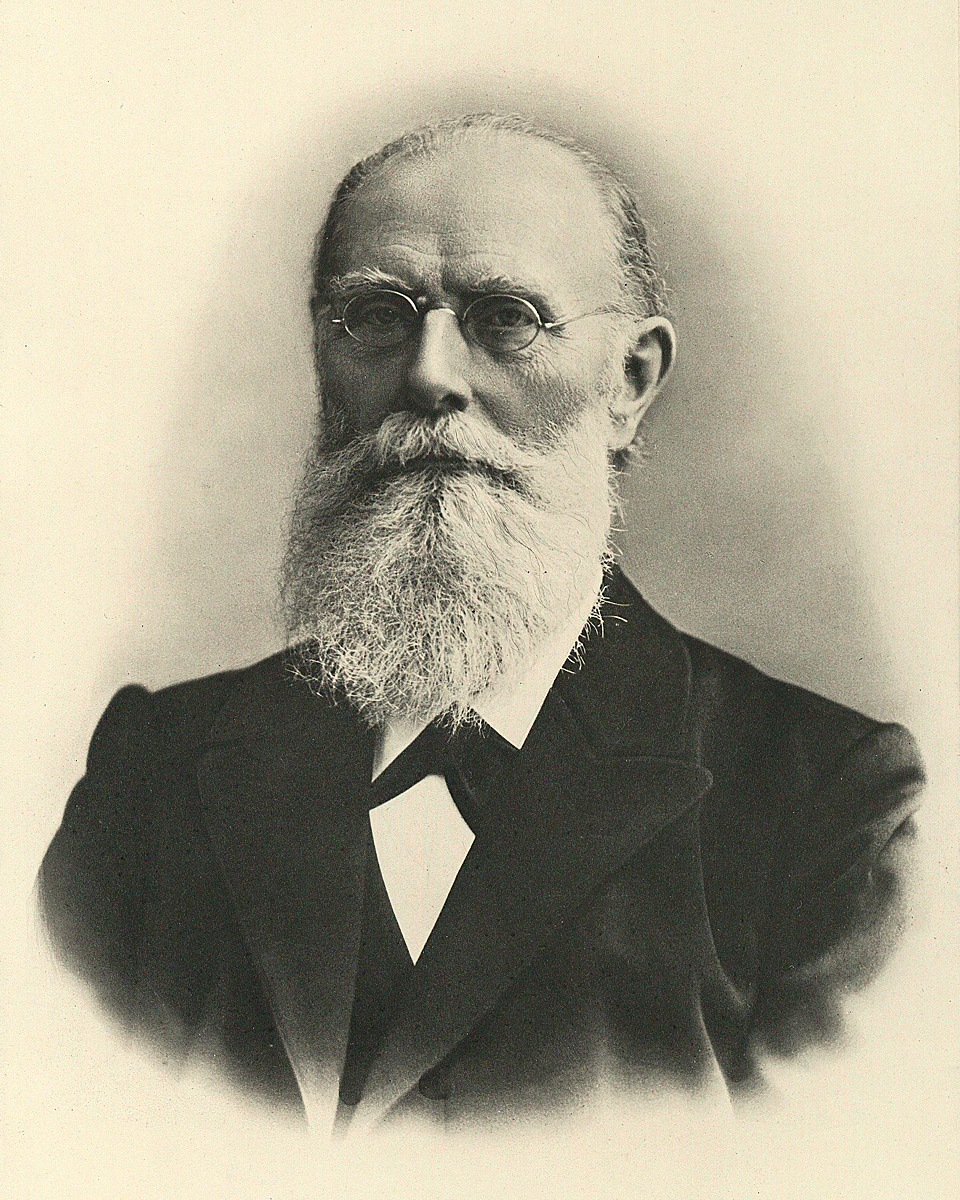
- Born: 28 January 1832; Münster, Province of Westphalia, Kingdom of Prussia
- Died: 7 September 1902 (aged 70); Braunfels, German Empire
- Occupations: Pianist; Conductor; Composer; Conservatory director
- Organizations: Munich Conservatory; Munich Court Opera; Cologne Conservatory
- Children: Ludwig Wüllner

Franz Wüllner (28 January 1832 – 7 September 1902) was a German composer and conductor. He led the premieres of Wagner's Das Rheingold and Die Walküre, but was much criticized by Wagner himself, who greatly preferred the more celebrated conductors Hans von Bülow and Hermann Levi.

== Biography ==
Wüllner was born in Münster and studied in his native place, and at Frankfurt, Berlin, Brussels, and Munich. Among his teachers was Anton Schindler, who styled himself Beethoven's amanuensis carrying on the true traditions of the master's style, a claim disputed by Beethoven's pupil Carl Czerny.

In 1856, Wüllner became instructor in piano at the Munich Conservatory. He held the position of town musical director at Aix-la-Chapelle from 1858 to 1864. In 1867, he became director of the choral classes in the reorganized School of Music at Munich and wrote for them Chorübungen der Münchener Musikschule, text of score reading and singing (Solfege).

He succeeded the temperamental Bülow in 1869 as conductor of the Court Opera and the Academy Courts. Here he conducted the first performances of Rheingold and Walküre (1869, 1870) before the production of the entire Ring cycle at the first Bayreuth Festival of 1876. It is for these renditions that he is usually remembered now.

He became court kapellmeister at Dresden and artistic director of the conservatory in 1877, and director of the Cologne Conservatory and conductor of the Gürzenich concerts in 1884. After 1864 he appeared frequently as conductor of the Lower Rhenish Music Festival. He died in Braunfels.

Among his notable pupils were Volkmar Andreae, Fritz Brun, Lothar Kempter, Bruno Klein, Jan van Gilse, Hans von Koessler, Karl Aagard Østvig, Ernst von Schuch, and the conductor Willem Mengelberg. See: List of music students by teacher: T to Z#Franz Wüllner. Mengelberg controversially claimed that his teacher's ties with Schindler gave Mengelberg a direct connection with Beethoven performance tradition.

Among his works are: Heinrich der Finkler, a cantata for solo, male chorus, and orchestra; additional recitatives to Weber's Oberon, accepted by many of Germany's principal theatres; a setting of Psalm 125, for chorus and orchestra; a setting of Psalm 51 (Miserere) for double choir; and a Stabat Mater for double choir; besides masses, motets, songs, chamber music, and piano pieces.

Wüllner was one of the editors of the Bach-Gesellschaft-Ausgabe, the first complete edition of the works of Johann Sebastian Bach.

== Recording ==
There is a recording fragment in the Thomas Edison National Historical Park archive from 1890 featuring Wüllner at the piano accompanying the singer Karl Mayer in Schubert's 'Wohin?'. This makes Wüllner the earliest-born person whose piano playing has been recorded acoustically (Saint-Saëns is usually credited with that, although he was born 3 years after Wüllner, and Carl Reinecke (1824–1910) left some piano rolls and not acoustic recordings). Unfortunately, the recording quality of the Wüllner cylinder is now so degraded that almost nothing can be discerned about the piano playing at all.
