= Ludwig Wüllner =

German tenor (1858–1938)

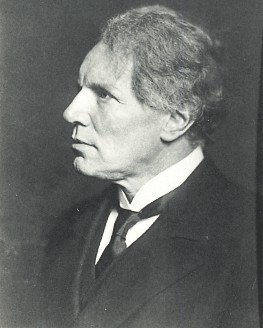
- Ludwig Wüllner c. 1910; photograph by Nicola Perscheid
- Born: 19 August 1858; Münster, Province of Westphalia, Kingdom of Prussia
- Died: 19 March 1938 (aged 79); Kiel, Germany
- Occupations: Tenor; Actor; Narrator; Lecturer
- Organizations: Meiningen Court Theatre
- Parent: Franz Wüllner

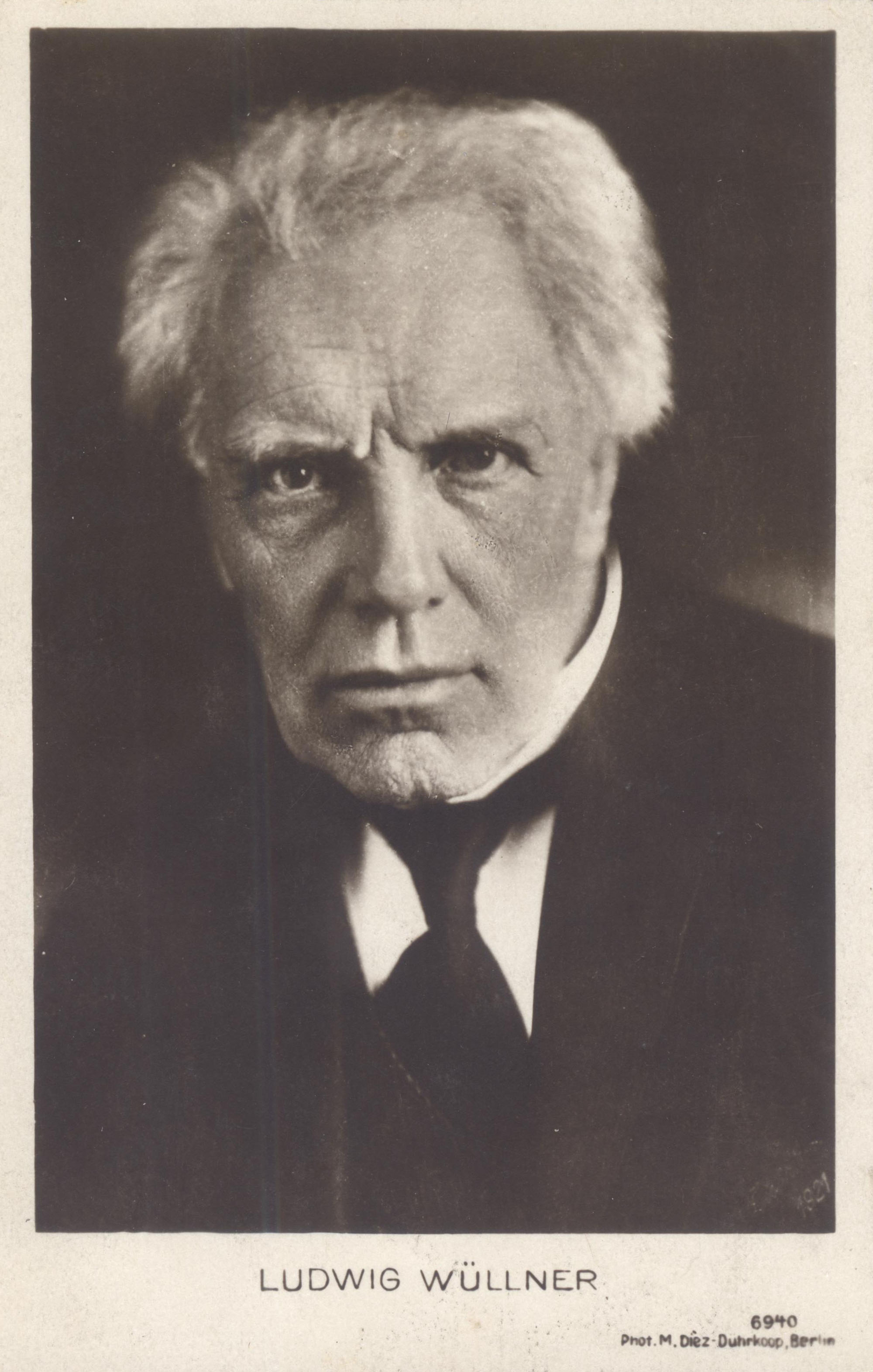
Ludwig Wüllner in 1921

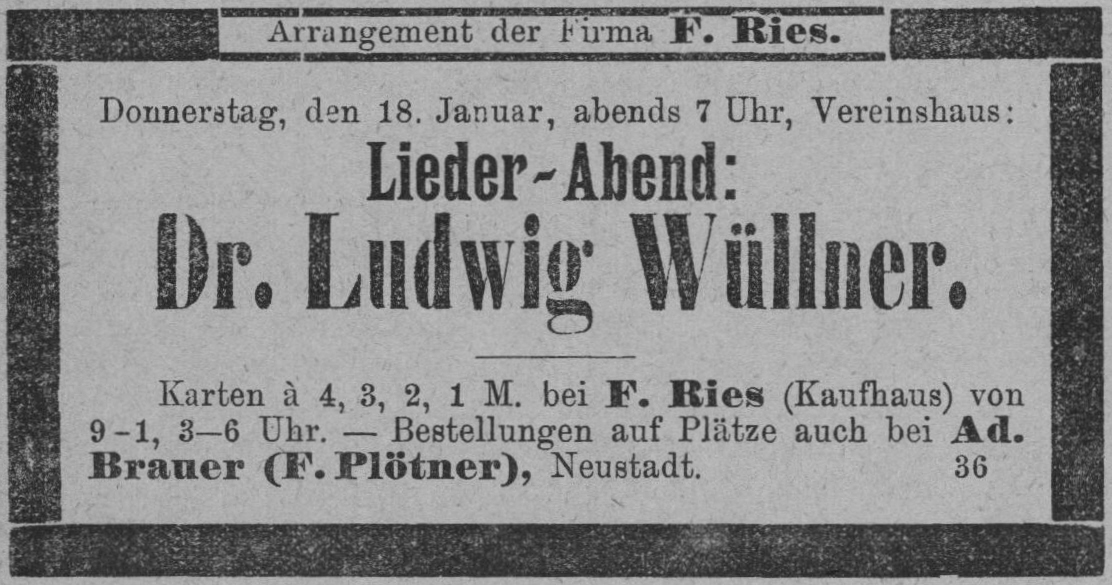
Newspaper ad 1906

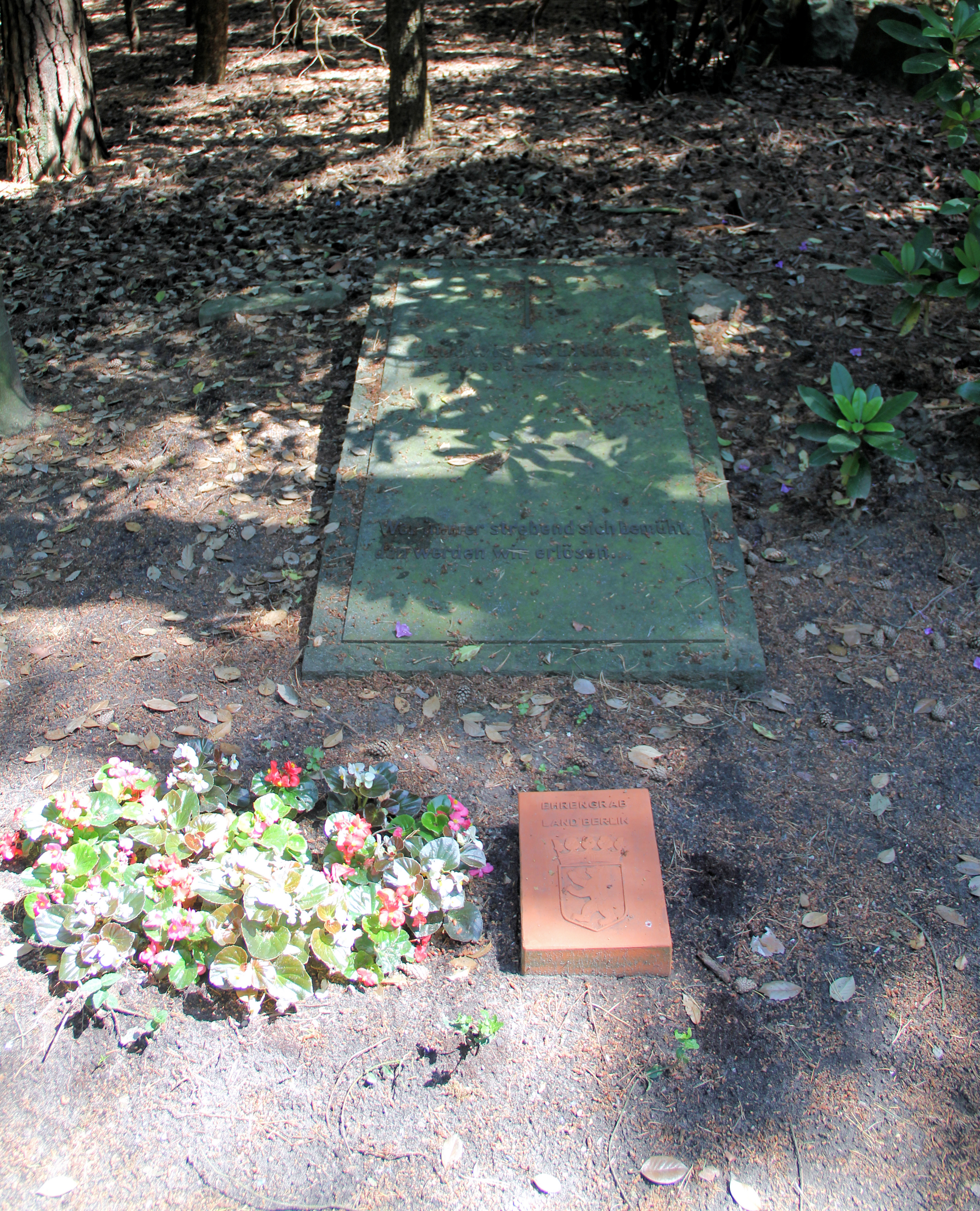
Honorary grave on the Parkfriedhof Lichterfelde

Ludwig Wüllner (19 August 1858 – 19 March 1938) was a German concert and operatic tenor, as well as an actor and narrator. He is regarded as one of the most versatile and important stage performers of his time.

== Life ==
Born in Münster, Wüllner was the son of the composer and conductor Franz Wüllner and grandson of the philologist Franz Wüllner (1798–1842). His mother was Anna, née Ludorff. He learned to play the piano and violin at an early age and sang in the choir of the Maximiliansgymnasium, Munich, which he attended in 1876 – among others with Rudolf von Hößlin, Karl Schlösser, Gustav von Schoch and Carl Seitz. From 1876 to 1880, he read German studies in Munich and Berlin and received his doctorate in 1881 in Strasbourg with the topic "Das Hrabanische Glossar und die ältesten Bayrischen Sprachdenkmäler. A grammatical treatise". After further studies in Berlin, he was Privatdozent for German philology at the Royal Theological and Philosophical Academy in Münster (today University of Münster) from 1884 to 1887. He performed as a violinist, singer and narrator.

From 1887, he studied voice (with Benno Stolzenberg), composition (with Gustav Jensen) and piano (with Otto Klauwell) at the Hochschule für Musik und Tanz Köln. In one of his first appearances as a concert singer, he sang the tenor part in Beethoven's Ninth Symphony with the Gürzenich Orchestra Cologne conducted by his father in 1888. In 1889, he was engaged as an actor at the Meiningen Court Theatre, where he worked until 1895. In 1889, Georg II, Duke of Saxe-Meiningen, awarded him the title of "Herzoglich Meiningischer Hofschauspieler". From 1889, he gave guest performances at the most important German-language theatres in the world, including Deutsches Theater Berlin, Vienna Burgtheater, Prinzregententheater in Munich, the Schauspielhaus in Leipzig and Deutsches Theater in New York. Wüllner made his operatic debut in 1896 at Deutsches Nationaltheater in Weimar in the title role of Wagner's Tannhäuser.

Wüllner was particularly known as a Lieder singer, collaborating with some of the most important musicians and composers of their time, such as Johannes Brahms, Richard Strauss, Fritz Steinbach, Arthur Nikisch, Hermann Zilcher, Artur Schnabel and Felix Weingartner. Wüllner was often called the "Kammersänger of the German people", admired for the clarity of his diction and the expressive dramatic presentation. Max Reger dedicated one of his six songs, Sechs Lieder, Op. 35, to him in 1899.

Wüllner performed in 1902 in Elgar's The Dream of Gerontius in a performance of the Lower Rhenish Music Festival in Düsseldorf. Successful concert tours took him to England, where he performed in 1903 in London and Manchester, to the Netherlands, France, Scandinavia, Russia, the UK and the U.S. Elgar dedicated his "The Wind at Dawn" to him in 1907. In 1910, Wüllner sang the American premiere of Gustav Mahler's Kindertotenlieder in New York, conducted by the composer.

Wüllner was also an important narrator and reciter of poems, ballads and monologues. He was particularly fond of the melodrama form, including the 1902 melodrama Das Hexenlied, with music by Max von Schillings and text by Ernst von Wildenbruch. A recording of this work was made in 1933 with the 74-year-old Wüllner and the Berlin Philharmonic conducted by the composer, only a few days before Schillings' death. There are several recordings of Wüllner's speaking voice in his unique style. Wüllner died in Kiel at the age of 79 and was buried in the Parkfriedhof Lichterfelde in Berlin-Steglitz (Ehren- und Familiengrab, im Walde 227). His grave was an honorary grave of the city of Berlin from 1956 to 2014.

== Drama roles ==
Wüllner appeared in dramatic roles including:

- Title role in Schiller's Wallenstein
- title role in Schumann's Manfred
- title role in Lessing's Nathan der Weise
- title role in Shakespeare's König Lear

== Recordings ==
- Schillings' Das Hexenlied & recitations: Ludwig Wüllner "Germany's greatest bard". Ludwig Wüllner (narrator), Max von Schillings (composer, conductor), Berlin Philharmonic Orchestra. Compact Disc, Bayer Records 200 049. 1999.
- Schillings' Das Hexenlied and other compositions. Max von Schillings (composer, conductor), Berliner Philharmoniker, Staatskapelle Berlin, Ludwig Wüllner (narrator), Barbara Kemp (soprano), Josef Mann (tenor). Compact Disc, Preiser 90294. 2001.
