= Love alone will stay =

"Love alone will stay" is a poem by Caroline Alice Elgar, set to music for voice and piano by her husband, the English composer Edward Elgar, in 1897.

The song was first published in the cultural magazine The Dome – "a Quarterly containing Examples of All the Arts". It is artistically scripted in Elgar's own hand, and signed and dated “12.IX.97.”

Elgar later included a revised version of the poem as the second song, renamed "In Haven", in his song-cycle for voice and orchestra "Sea Pictures".

== Lyrics ==
as published in "The Dome" LOVE ALONE WILL STAY Closely cling, for winds drive fast, Blossoms perish in the blast, Love alone will last. Closely let me hold thy hand, Storms are sweeping sea and land, Love alone will stand. Kiss my lips, and softly say, "Joy may go and sunlit day, Love alone will stay."	in "Sea Pictures" IN HAVEN (CAPRI) Closely let me hold thy hand, Storms are sweeping sea and land; Love alone will stand. Closely cling, for waves beat fast, Foam-flakes cloud the hurrying blast; Love alone will last. Kiss my lips, and softly say: "Joy, sea-swept, may fade to-day; Love alone will stay."
