= Edwin Bush =

English murderer (1940-1961)

Coordinates: 51°30′39″N 0°07′41″W

- Born: 1940; England
- Died: 6 July 1961 (aged 21); HMP Pentonville, London, England
- Occupation: Labourer
- Status: Executed
- Motive: Robbery
- Conviction: Capital murder
- Penalty: Death by hanging

Edwin Albert Arthur Bush (1940 – 6 July 1961) was the first criminal in Britain to be caught through the use of the Identikit facial composite system, the second to last executed in London and the last to be hanged at Pentonville Prison.

== Early life ==
Bush was born to an English mother and an Indian father and was taken into care at age 12 after his living conditions were deemed to be horrific. He later embarked on a life of crime and ended up in Borstal, before the age of 18. By 20, he was living in the slums of Honor Oak, in South East London.

== Murder ==
On March 3, 1961, Elsie May Batten, a 59-year-old assistant in an antique shop in Cecil Court off Charing Cross Road in London was found stabbed to death with an antique dagger and an ornamental dress sword had been stolen. Her body was discovered by the shop owner Louis Meier, who helped detectives try new technology, Identikit, which used a standardised set of facial features to help a witness build a picture of a suspect. During Meier's interview, an image of a suspicious man who had gone into the shop two days before Batten's killing to admire the sword was constructed. Another witness, who had seen a man and his blond girlfriend try to sell a sword the same day as the murder, also used Identikit, so both facial likenesses from the two independent witnesses were printed in local newspapers and distributed to local police officers.

=== Arrest ===
On March 16 Bush and his 17-year-old blonde girlfriend Janet were in Central London, having recently sold the ornamental dress sword. As they walked up Old Compton Street PC Arthur Cole spotted the couple looking in a shop window and recognised Bush from the Identikit images. Bush was arrested and interviewed by police; he claimed innocence but his palm print was found on the dagger, his fingerprints on the sword and a shoeprint at the scene of the murder matched the shoes he was wearing. He was then picked out in an identity parade by a man to whom he had attempted to sell the sword. Bush wrote a full statement admitting the murder and insisting his girlfriend had nothing to do with it. He said in his statement, "I am sorry I done it I don't know what came over me. Speaking personally the world is better off without me."

=== Trial and execution ===
Bush stood trial at the Old Bailey in May 1961 in a case that lasted just two days. He claimed his attack on Elsie was motivated solely by her making racial slurs as they haggled over the price. Bush was sentenced to death on 12 May 1961 by Mr Justice Stevenson, under section 5 of the Homicide Act 1957, charged with “murder in the course or furtherance of theft”, and hanged at Pentonville on 6 July 1961 by Harry Allen.
