= The Salisbury, Covent Garden =

Pub in Covent Garden, London

The Salisbury
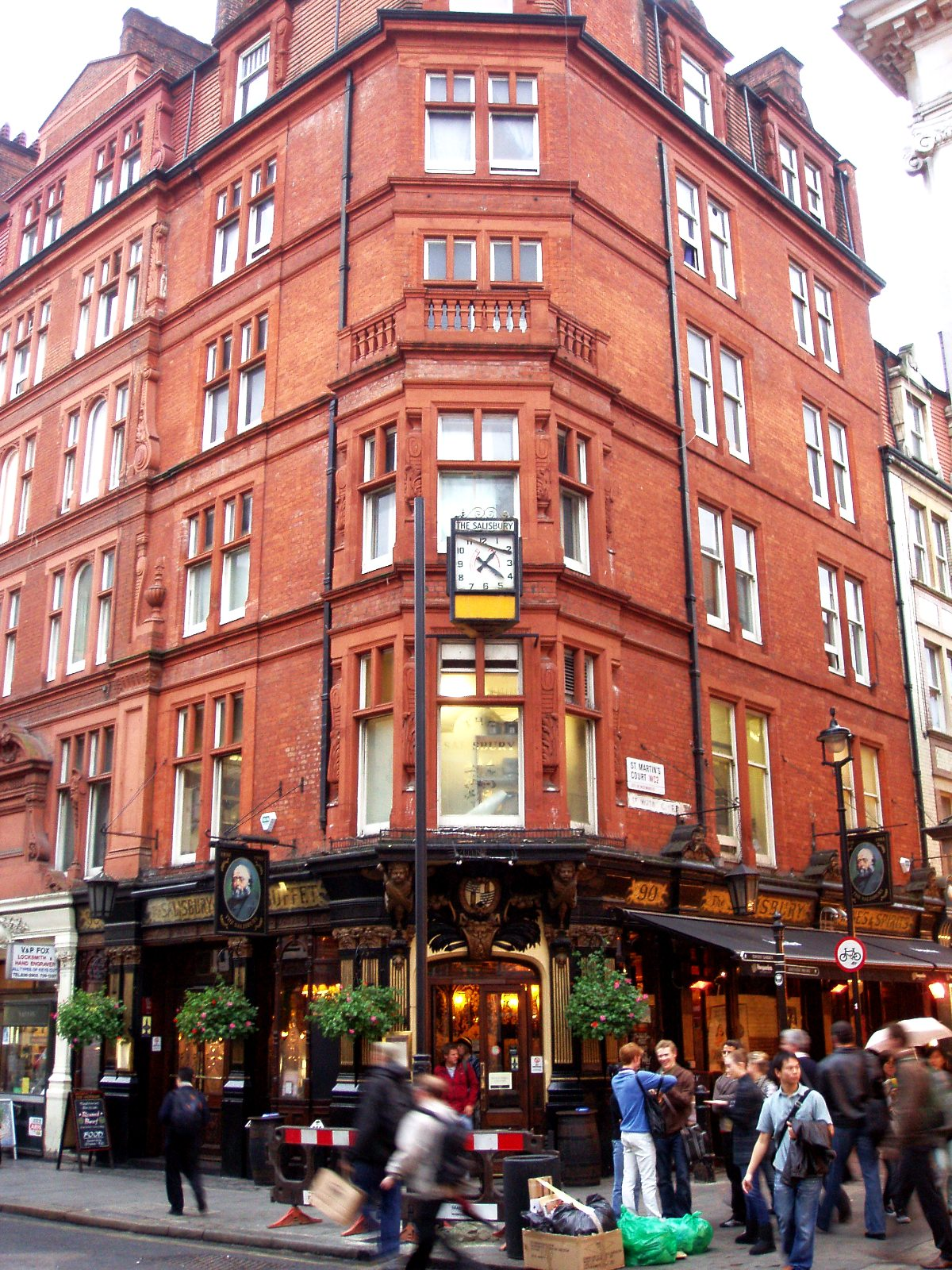
- The Salisbury
- Type: Public house
- Location: 91-93, ST MARTIN'S LANE WC2
- Coordinates: 51°30′39.24″N 0°7′38.28″W
- Built: c. 1899
- Architectural style(s): Victorian, Art Nouveau

Listed Building – Grade II
- Official name: THE SALISBURY PUBLIC HOUSE AND 91-93, ST MARTIN'S LANE
- Designated: 05-Feb-1970
- Reference no.: 1236050

The Salisbury is a Grade II listed public house at 91–93 St Martin's Lane, Covent Garden, London which is noted for its particularly fine late Victorian interior with Art Nouveau elements.

== History ==
It was built as part of a six-storey block in about 1899 on the site of an earlier pub that had been known under several names, including the Coach and Horses and Ben Caunt's Head. As well as being Grade II listed by Historic England, the interior is on CAMRA's National Inventory as being "an historic pub interior of national importance", due to the quality and opulence of the etched and polished glass and the carved woodwork. The "SS" motif that can be seen etched into the glass and in a few places is because the pub was originally called the "Salisbury Stores". The use of the word "Stores" was not uncommon in pub names of that era. Other fittings include art nouveau bronze nymphs holding long-stemmed flowers with light bulbs in the middle of the flowers, which are said to be original.

The pub is named after Lord Salisbury (1830–1903), who was the British Prime Minister three times between 1885 and 1902. The Cecil family still owns the building's freehold, and the Cecil family coat of arms lies between two angels supporting a canopy above the door on the corner. Nearby Cecil Court is also named after the family.

== Notoriety ==
The Salisbury was well known as a gay-friendly pub from Oscar Wilde's time up until the mid-1980s. The 1961 British suspense film Victim, directed by Basil Dearden and starring Dirk Bogarde and Sylvia Syms, includes scenes inside and outside The Salisbury and was the first English language film to use the word "homosexual".

In 1979, the British serial killer Dennis Nilsen attempted to murder Andrew Ho, a student from Hong Kong that he had met in The Salisbury. Although Ho went to the police and Nilsen was questioned, the student chose not to testify, so no charges were brought against Nilsen. Nilsen had already killed once, and went on to murder another fourteen young men.

== Gallery ==
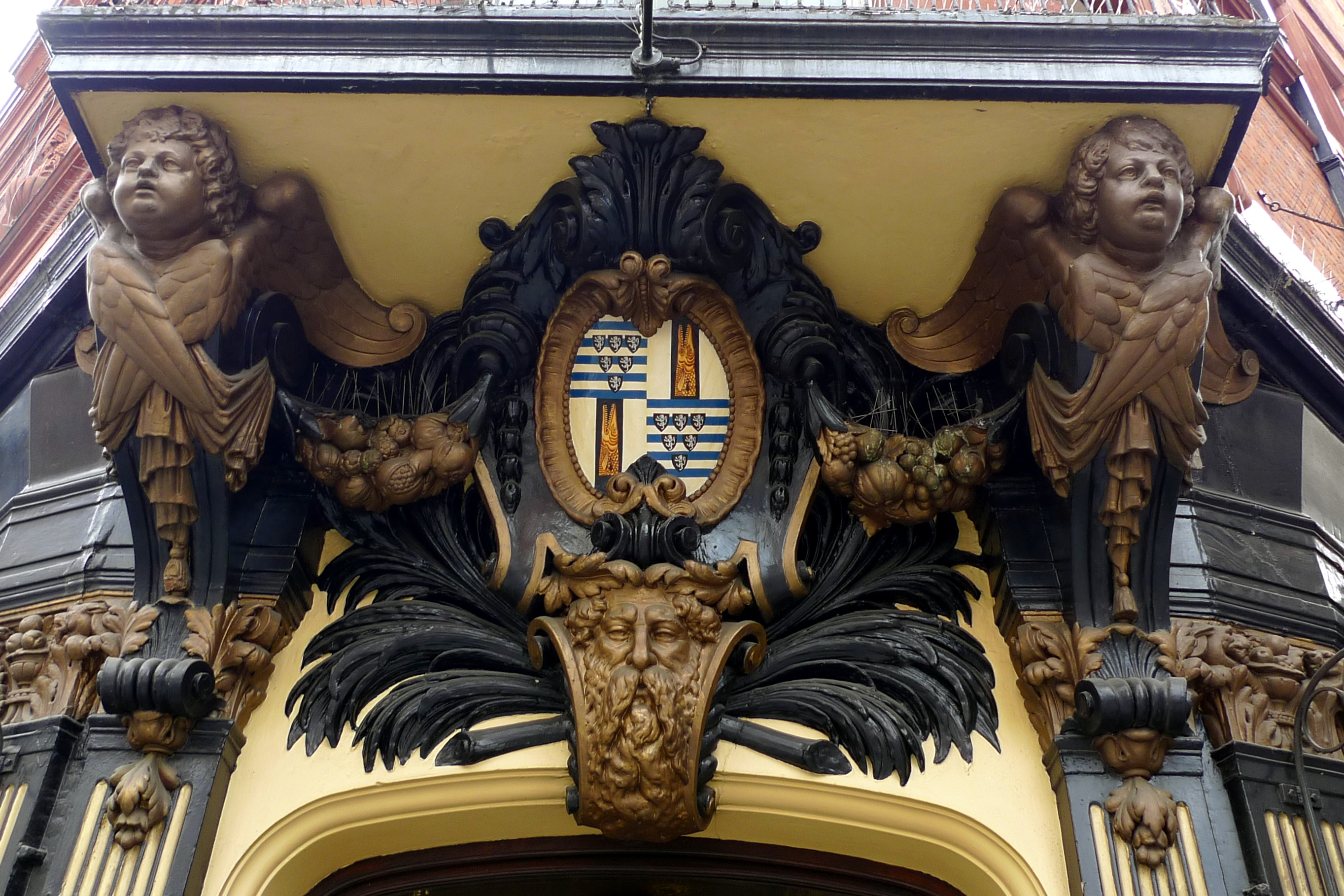
Coat of arms between angels above corner doorway

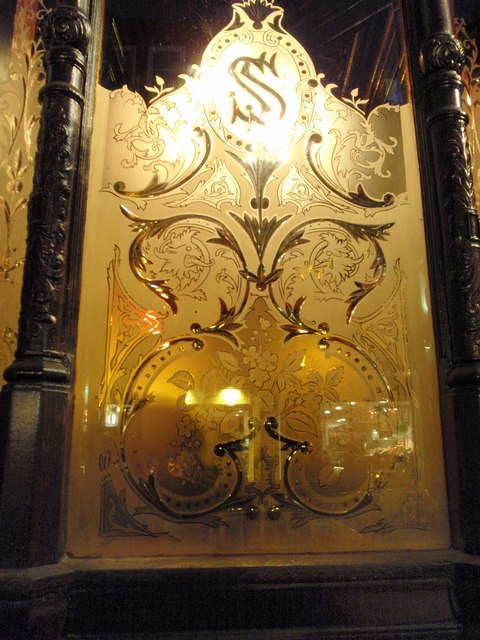
Etched window glass with "SS" motif

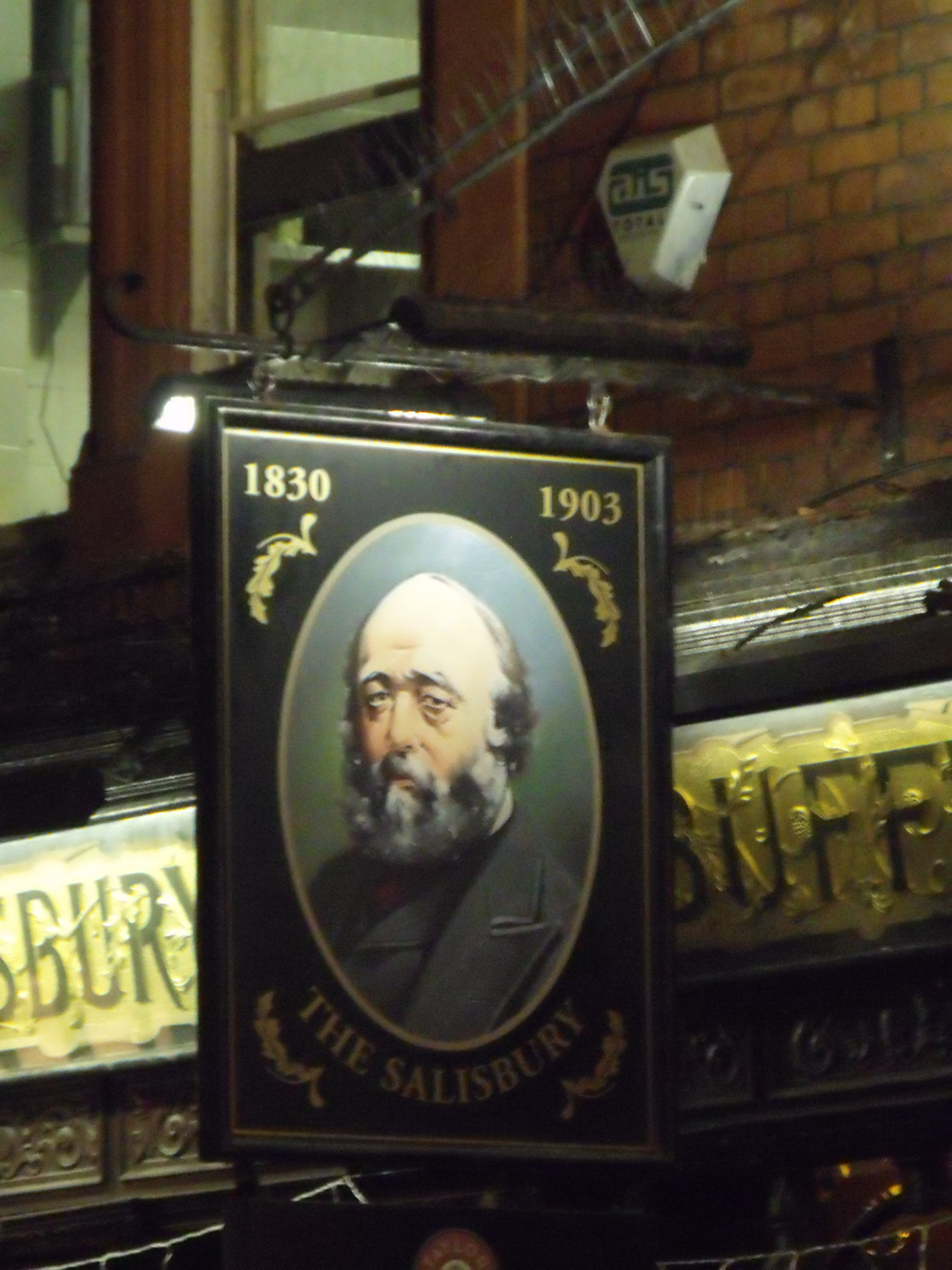
The pub sign showing Lord Salisbury
