= St Martin's Lane =

Street in the City of Westminster, London

Coordinates: 51°30′38″N 0°07′38″W

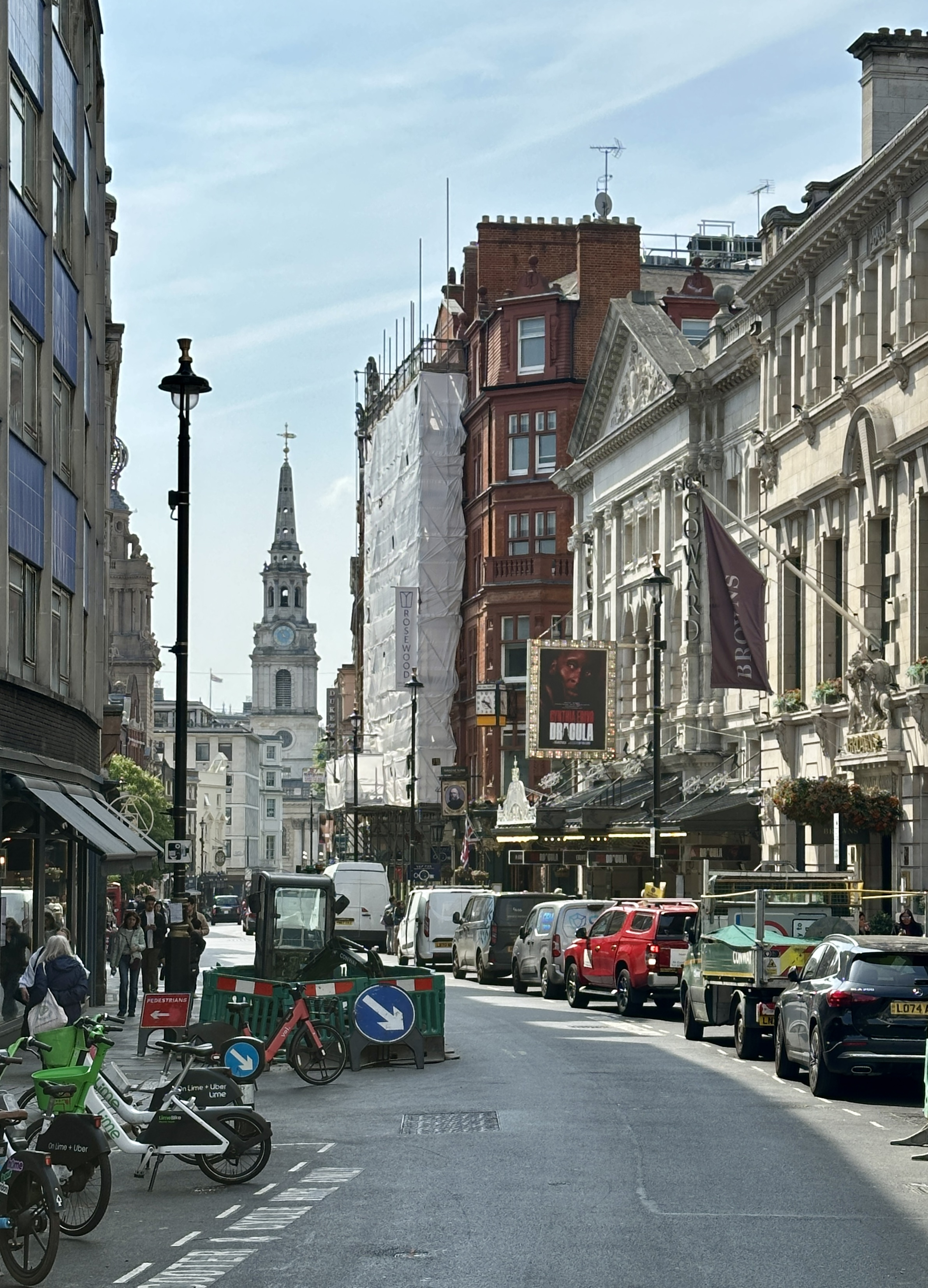
St Martin's Lane with the Noël Coward Theatre in the foreground and St Martin-in-the-Fields in the background

St Martin's Lane is a street in the City of Westminster, which runs from the church of St Martin-in-the-Fields, after which it is named, near Trafalgar Square, northwards to Long Acre. At its northern end, it becomes Monmouth Street. St Martin's Lane and Monmouth Street together form the B404.

St Martin's Lane should not be confused with St Martin's Street, which is located near Leicester Square on the north side of the National Gallery.

== History ==
The street was first built up in 1610 when Robert Cecil, 1st Earl of Salisbury, was granted 5 acres (2.0 ha) of land on the street's west side. It was originally known as West Church Lane; the current name dates from 1618.

A narrow street with relatively little traffic, St Martin's Lane is home to the English National Opera at the Coliseum Theatre, as well as two other theatres, the Duke of York's Theatre and the Noël Coward Theatre, second-hand bookshops, antique dealers, and high-class gentlemen's outfitters. It also has a large number of cafes and a music shop aimed at opera and theatre goers. The theatrical agency set up by Peggy Ramsay in 1953 was located in Goodwin's Court, an alley leading off the lane. Two pedestrian alleys, St Martin's Court and Cecil Court, connect St Martin's Lane with Charing Cross Road and have similar usage.

In the 18th-century St Martin's Lane was noted for the academy founded by William Hogarth and later for premises of cabinet-makers and "upholsterers" such as Thomas Chippendale, who moved to better premises there in 1753, Vile and Cobb, and William Hallett around the corner in Newport Street.

The company Macmillan & Co. Limited was situated in St. Martin's Street, which also resulted in the founding of the name carrying St. Martin's Press in the United States.

== The Salisbury ==
The Salisbury in Covent Garden was built as part of a six-storey block around 1899 on the site of an earlier pub that had been known under several names, including the Coach & Horses and Ben Caunt's Head; it is both Grade II listed, and on CAMRA's National Inventory, due to the quality of the etched and polished glass and the carved woodwork.

== Films ==
The film St Martin's Lane (also known as Sidewalks of London, 1938) starring Vivien Leigh, Rex Harrison, and Charles Laughton, later formed the basis of the Broadway musical Busker Alley. The street is also prominently featured throughout the 1961 film Victim, which also has scenes in Salisbury.
