= Where Corals Lie =

The Where Corals Lie song cover.

"Where Corals Lie" is a poem by Richard Garnett which was set to music by Edward Elgar as the fourth song in his song-cycle Sea Pictures. The poem was first published in Io in Egypt and other poems in 1859 and subsequently anthologized in Sea Music in 1888.

== Lyrics ==
(Italicised text indicates lines repeated in the song, but not in the original poem.)

The deeps have music soft and low
When winds awake the airy spry,
It lures me, lures me on to go
And see the land where corals lie.
The land where corals lie.

By mount and mead, by lawn and rill,
When night is deep, and moon is high,
That music seeks and finds me still,
And tells me where the corals lie.
And tells me where the corals lie.

Yes, press my eyelids close, 'tis well,
Yes, press my eyelids close, 'tis well,
But far the rapid fancies fly
To rolling worlds of wave and shell,
And all the land where corals lie.

Thy lips are like a sunset glow,
Thy smile is like a morning sky,
Yet leave me, leave me, let me go
And see the land where corals lie.
The land, the land, where corals lie.

== Elgar's setting ==
Elgar's music is in the key of B minor. It alternates between the regular off-beat quaver accompaniment and, at the end of each verse, a single colla parte bar that slows down the tempo to emphasise the text and which requires sensitive accompaniment. Woodwind refrains add colour and contrast. Elgar doubles the vocal lines with flute and clarinet (verse one), solo cello (verse two), and violins (verse four). The third stanza is the most challenging, with frequent colla parte, a suspension of the syncopation and an accelerando into a lower register.

It was the most popular of the songs in Sea Pictures. In this musical form, it was a great favourite in Britain, appearing in the classical favourites programme, Your Hundred Best Tunes.

== Notable recordings ==
- Dame Clara Butt — 1912
- Maartje Offers —1928
- Dame Janet Baker— 1965

These New Puritans include a reworking of Where Corals Lie on their 2010 album Hidden.

For a full list of recordings, see the Sea Pictures page.
