= The Dome (periodical) =

British arts periodical published from 1897 to 1900

Poster for The Dome from October 1, 1898. Illustrated by Edward Gordon Craig. 758 × 509 mm. Museu Nacional d'Art de Catalunya

The Dome, subtitled consecutively "A Quarterly Containing Examples of All the Arts" and "An Illustrated Monthly Magazine and Review", was a literary periodical associated with the "Nineties" scene, edited by Ernest J. Oldmeadow, publisher and manager of The Unicorn Press based in London at 7 Cecil Court. It ran for three years, from March 1897 to July 1900. It is usually considered to be the last more or less successful attempt to deliver a valuable literary magazine with a considerable circulation, yet working from an Aestheticist rationale, according to Walter Pater's concepts.

Even more than its decadent movement predecessors The Yellow Book (published 1884–97) and The Savoy (1896), The Dome dealt with both visual and verbal art, and it also covered music and theatre. It was known for its in-depth studies of painters which rose above the level of mere appreciations, and often championed promising talents such as Edward Elgar. The magazine was the last example of British avant-garde publications which focused on Aestheticism since the future avant-garde magazines would focus on modernism.

== Notable contributors ==
- Laurence Binyon - a story "The Paralytic" (No. 4, 1898)
- Lucas Cranach - woodcuts "The Annunciation", "A Saxon Prince on Horseback" (No. 2, 1897)
- Edward Gordon Craig
- Campbell Dodgson
- Albert Dürer - an engraving "St. Hubert" (No. 2, 1897)
- Edward Elgar - a piano solo Minuet (No. 2, 1897); a song Love alone will stay (No. 4, 1898)
- Roger Fry
- Althea Gyles – illustrations, including "Aided Cloinne Uisnigh" (The Violent Death of the Children of Uisnigh), 1897
- Hiroshige - a colour print "The Wave" (No. 4, 1898)
- Hokusai - a print "Fuji through Rain" (No. 4, 1898)
- Laurence Housman - stories "The Troubling of the Waters" (No. 2, 1897); "Little Saint Michael" (No. 4, 1898)
- Liza Lehmann - a song "Aus Mirza Schaffy" (No. 2, 1897)
- Will G. Mein
- Alice Meynell
- G. B. Piranesi - drawings and etchings (No. 4, 1898)
- D. G. Rossetti - a painting "The Sea-Spell" (No. 2, 1897)
- Martin Schongauer
- William Strang
- Arthur Symons
- Francis Thompson
- Ethel Rolt Wheeler
- William Butler Yeats - a poem "The Desire of Man and of Woman" (No. 2, 1897)

== Bibliography ==
- Darcy, Cornelius P. "The Dome" in British Literary Magazines: The Victorian and Edwardian Age, 1837-1913. Ed. Alvin Sullivan. London: Greenwood Press (1984)
- Jackson, Jeffrey B. and Dana L. Jemison, eds. The Dome: Complete Index, 1897-1900. San Francisco, Calif.: Quat'z'Arts Press, 2007.
