= Holywell Street, London =

Former street in London

Coordinates: 51°30′46.65″N 0°6′55.24″W

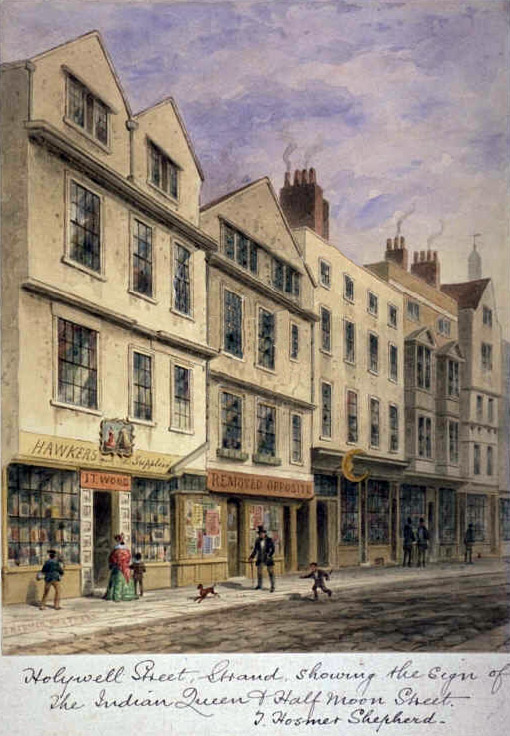
Holywell Street, Strand. by Thomas Hosmer Shepherd (1793–1864)

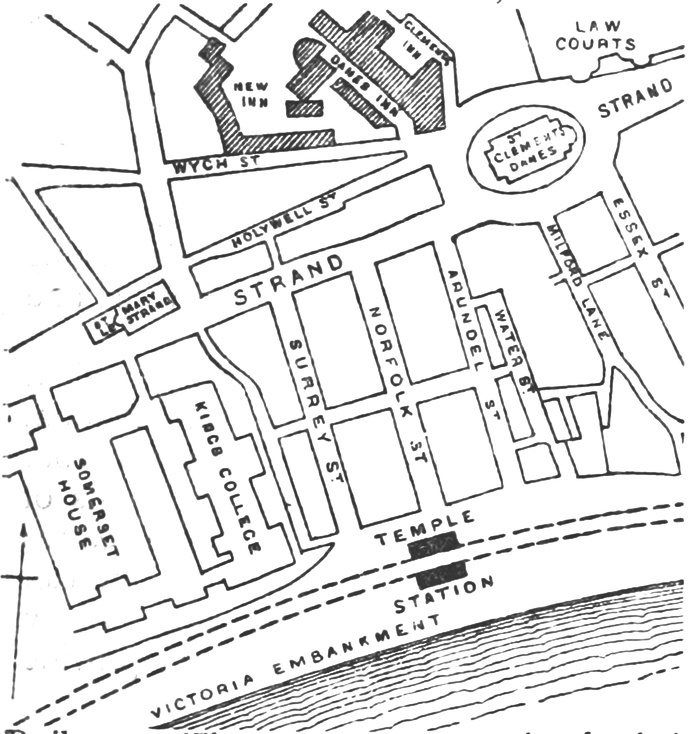
Holywell Street on an 1888 map of London

Holywell Street was a brief, secondary, northern carriageway of part of the Strand, London. It was accordingly subsumed in name when the Strand was widened in 1900. Aside from housing above it was the centre for the sale of romance books and pornography in Victorian London during which time it was known as 'Booksellers' Row'.
