= Two Songs, Op. 35 (Sibelius) =

Collection of art songs by Jean Sibelius (1908)

Six Songs, Op. 35
- Song collection by Jean Sibelius
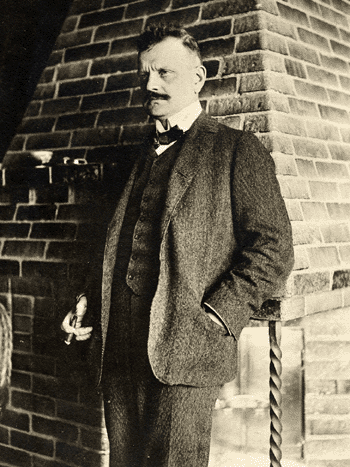
- The composer (c. 1907)
- Opus: 35
- Language: Swedish
- Composed: 1908

External audio
- Sung by Karita Mattila, accompanied by Ilmo Ranta (No. 1); sung by Tom Krause, accompanied by Irwin Gage (No. 2)
- No. 1, "Jubal"
- No. 2, "Teodora"

The Two Songs, Op. 35, (Note: Because Sibelius's Op. 35 songs are sung in Swedish, this article gives preference to each song's native title, rather than the English translation.) is a collection of Swedish-language art songs for vocal soloist and piano written in 1908 by the Finnish composer Jean Sibelius. (Note: All but a few of Sibelius's songs are settings of Swedish-language poems (quantitatively, his favorite poets were Ernst Josephson, Johan Ludvig Runeberg, Viktor Rydberg, and Karl August Tavaststjerna) and are with piano accompaniment. While many are of high quality, they largely have been neglected outside the Nordic realm, due to the limited coverage (in terms of number of speakers) of Swedish (relative to, for example, German or French).) Though considered "masterpieces", the two songs are among the "strangest" songs in Sibelius's oeuvre. "Jubal" (No. 1), furthermore, anticipates Luonnotar, the tone poem for soprano and orchestra (Op. 70, 1913).

== Constituent songs ==
Ordered by catalogue number, the Op. 35 songs are as follows:

- "Jubal", Op. 35/1; text by the Swedish poet Ernst Josephson
- "Teodora", Op. 35/2; text by the Finnish poet Bertel Gripenberg

The songs were first published in 1910 by the German firm of Breitkopf & Härtel. The table below provides additional information about each song:

| Song | Tempo | Time | Key | Premiere | | | | Ref. |
| Song | Tempo | Time | Key | Soloist | Pianist | Date | Venue | Ref. |
|---|---|---|---|---|---|---|---|---|
| No. 1 | Tranquillo assai | common time | B-flat major | Aino Ackté | Oskar Merikanto | 24 September 1908 | Finnish National Theatre | |
| No. 2 | Moderato | 3/4 | D-flat major | —N/a | —N/a | —N/a | —N/a | |

== Notes, references, and sources ==
=== Sources ===
- Barnett, Andrew (2007). Sibelius. New Haven, Connecticut: Yale University Press. ISBN 978-0-300-16397-1.
- Dahlström, Fabian [in Swedish] (2003). Jean Sibelius: Thematisch-bibliographisches Verzeichnis seiner Werke [Jean Sibelius: A Thematic Bibliographic Index of His Works] (in German). Wiesbaden: Breitkopf & Härtel. ISBN 3-7651-0333-0.
- Layton, Robert (1993) [1965]. Sibelius. (The Master Musicians Series) (4th ed.). New York: Schirmer Books. ISBN 0028713222.
