= List of compositions by Anton Bruckner =

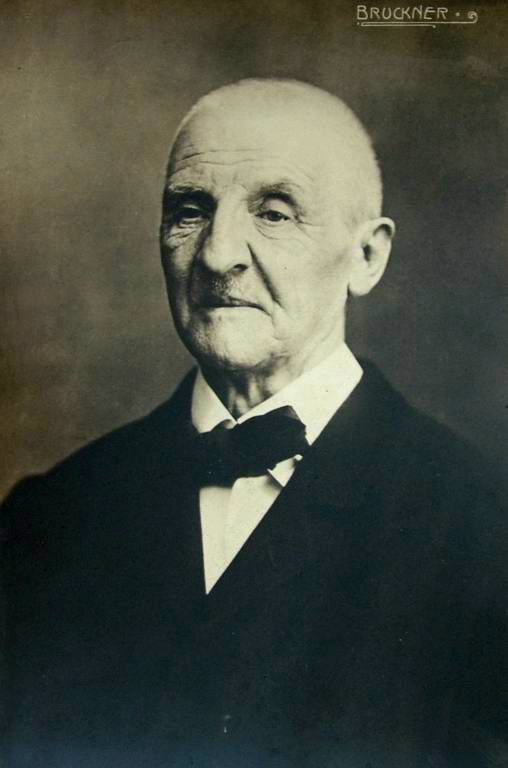
Anton Bruckner

Anton Bruckner is best known for his symphonic works; there are 11 symphonies (the last with an unfinished finale), most of them in several versions. He also composed a few other smaller orchestral works (one overture, one march and three 'small orchestral pieces'), and sketched another symphony.

Bruckner also composed a considerable amount of choral music. There are 59 religious works, of which there are 17 larger choral works (seven masses, two requiems, one religious cantata, five psalm settings, one Te Deum hymn and one Magnificat hymn), 40 smaller choral works (16 hymns, six antiphons, six graduals, three settings of the offertorium, two chorale, two religious elegies, two Libera me, one litany and two other motets), of which a few are in two or three versions, and two aequalia for three trombones. In addition, Bruckner made sketches for two other masses and another requiem. Bruckner also composed 44 Weltliche Chorwerke (secular choral works), seven secular cantatas, of which two are in three versions, and about 20 Lieder for voice and piano.

Bruckner's chamber music includes one theme and variations and six scherzos for string quartet, one string quartet with alternative rondo, one string quintet with additional intermezzo, one duo for violin and piano, and about 50 small piano works.

Other instrumental music includes a few organ works, of which some are of doubtful authorship, and one military march for concert band.

== Werkverzeichnis Anton Bruckner (WAB) ==
The WAB numbers, used in the table below, refer to the Werkverzeichnis Anton Bruckner. This is a thematic catalogue of the music of Anton Bruckner compiled by Renate Grasberger. Lost works, sketches, etc. were added afterwards. Some other, still unclassified, works were identified as WAB deest. The WAB uses a single range of numbers divided into subranges for genre classification. Grasberger sorted the compositions alphabetically by title within each of the subranges. For a few of the pieces, she used an alternate title, which is less used today, or classified them in different subranges than the current Gesamtausgabe.

- WAB 1–54 Sacred choral music
- WAB 55–95 Secular choral music
- WAB 96–109 Orchestral works
- WAB 110–113 Chamber music
- WAB 114–116 Brass ensemble music
- WAB 117–124 Solo piano music
- WAB 125–131 Music for organ
- WAB 132–135 Lost works
- WAB 136–143 Sketches
- WAB 144–145 Doubtful works
- WAB 146–149 Addendum

New attributions and findings, as well as the re-evaluation of the incerta and falsa, require a in-depth revision of the WAB classification. This work is done in the framework of the research project Digitales Werkverzeichnis Anton Bruckner (dWAB, 2017–2019) of the Österreichische Akademie der Wissenschaften. WAB deest works are classified as follows

- WAB 200–224 Original works
- WAB 225–229 Lost works
- WAB add 230–245 Sketches
- WAB add 246–259 Study books
- WAB add 260–329 Adaptations & transcriptions
- WAB add 330-334 Incerta & falsa

== List ==
ID	Title	Key	Genre	Scored for	Composed	IMSLP	Notes
=== Sacred choral music ===
WAB 1	Afferentur regi	F major	Offertorium	Choir and three trombones ad lib.	1861	♫	
WAB 2	Am Grabe	F minor	Elegy	Male choir	1861	♫	Reissue a cappella of first three strophes of Vor Arneths Grab (WAB 53). Elegy for Josefine Hafferl
WAB 3/1	Asperges me No. 1	Aeolian mode	Antiphon	Choir and organ	c. 1845	♫	Antiphon for the Asperges of Septuagesima Sunday till the 4th Sunday of Lent
WAB 3/2	Asperges me No. 2	F major	Antiphon	Choir and organ	c. 1845	♫	Antiphon for the Asperges of Passion Sunday
WAB 4	Asperges me	F major	Antiphon	Choir	c. 1844	♫	Antiphon for the Asperges
WAB 5	Ave Maria	F major	Hymn	Soprano, alto, choir, organ, and cello	1856	♫	Hail Mary, a Marian hymn
WAB 6	Ave Maria	F major	Hymn	Choir (SAATTBB)	1861	♫	Hail Mary, a Marian hymn
WAB 7	Ave Maria	F major	Hymn	Alto, and piano, organ or harmonium	1882	♫	Hail Mary, a Marian hymn
WAB 8	Ave Regina caelorum	Gregorian mode	Antiphon	Voices and organ	c. 1886	♫	Ave Regina caelorum, a Marian antiphon
WAB 9	Messe für den Gründonnerstag	F major	Mass	Choir	1844	♫	Landmesse (Missa brevis) composed in Kronstorf for Maundy Thursday, put as Christus factus est by Grasberger. The extra Kyrie and Gloria, composed in 1845, are lost (see WAB 227).
WAB 10	Christus factus est	D minor	Gradual	Choir (SSAATTBB), three trombones and strings ad lib.	c. 1873	♫	Graduale for Maundy Thursday
WAB 11	Christus factus est	D minor	Gradual	Choir	1884	♫	Graduale for Maundy Thursday
WAB 12	Dir, Herr, dir will ich mich ergeben	A major	Chorale	Choir	c. 1845	♫	
WAB 13	Ecce sacerdos magnus	A minor	Antiphon	Choir, three trombones and organ	1885	♫	Ecce sacerdos magnus for the celebration of the 100th anniversary of the Diocese of Linz
WAB 14	Entsagen	B♭ major	Cantata	Soprano or tenor, choir, and piano or organ	c. 1851	♫	1st Name-day cantata for prelate Michael Arneth. Lyrics from the poem Amaranth by Oskar von Redwitz
WAB 15	Festgesang St. Jodok spross aus edlem Stamm	C major	Cantata	Soprano, tenor, bass, choir, and piano	1855	♫	Name-day cantata for dean Jodok Stülz
WAB 16	Festive Cantata Preiset den Herrn	D major	Cantata	Bass, male quartet, male choir, winds and timpani	1862	♫	To celebrate the laying of the foundation stone of the new Mariä-Empfängnis-Dom
WAB 17a	In jener letzten der Nächte	F minor	Chorale	Voice and organ	c. 1848	♫	Passion chorale for Maundy Thursday. 1st setting
WAB 17b	In jener letzten der Nächte	F minor	Chorale	Choir	c. 1848	♫	2nd setting
WAB 18a	Iam lucis orto sidere	Phrygian mode	Hymn	Choir	1868	♫	Also called In S. Angelum custodem. Version 1, 1st setting
WAB 18b	Iam lucis orto sidere	Phrygian mode	Hymn	Choir and organ	1868	♫	Version 1, 2nd setting
WAB 18c	Iam lucis orto sidere	G minor	Hymn	Male choir	1886	♫	Version 2
WAB 19	Inveni David	F minor	Offertorium	Male choir and four trombones	1868	♫	
WAB 20	Inveni David			Voices and organ	1879	♫	Ending verse Inveni David of Os justi (WAB 30), which was skipped in the first edition. Put as separate work by Grasberger
WAB 21	Libera me	F major	Libera me	Choir and organ	c. 1843	♫	
WAB 22	Libera me	F minor	Libera me	Choir (SSATB), three trombones, organ, cello, and contrabass	1854	♫	Absoute for prelate Michael Arneth
WAB 23	Locus iste	C major	Gradual	Choir	1869	♫	
WAB 24	Magnificat	B♭ major	Magnificat	Vocal quartet, choir, two trumpets, timpani, organ, and strings without viola	1852	♫	
WAB 25	Windhaager Messe	C major	Mass	Alto, two horns, and organ	1842	♫	A Missa brevis composed in Windhaag, also called Messe in C-Dur (Mass in C major).
WAB 26	Mass No. 1	D minor	Mass	Vocal quartet, choir, orchestra, and organ ad lib.	1864	♫	revised in 1876 and 1881/1882
WAB 27	Mass No. 2	E minor	Mass	Choir and winds	1866	♫	2nd version: 1882
WAB 28	Mass No. 3	F minor	Mass	Vocal quartet, choir, orchestra, and organ ad lib.	1868	♫	revised in 1876/1877, 1881/1883 and 1890/1893 (Schalk version)
WAB 29	Missa solemnis	B♭ minor	Mass	Vocal quartet, choir, organ, and orchestra	1854	♫	Missa solemnis for Friedrich Mayer's elevation
WAB 30	Os justi	Lydian mode	Gradual	Choir and organ	1879	♫	A cappella, except for the ending verse Inveni David, which was skipped in the first edition. See WAB 20.
WAB 31	Pange lingua	C major	Hymn	Choir	c. 1835/1891	♫	A setting of Pange lingua; "restored" in 1891.
WAB 32	Tantum ergo	D major	Hymn	Choir	c. 1845	♫	A setting of Tantum ergo (last two verses of Pange lingua), incorrectly classified as Pange lingua by Grasberger
WAB 33	Pange lingua	Phrygian mode	Hymn	Choir	1868	♫	A setting of Pange lingua and Tantum ergo
WAB 34	Psalm 22	E♭ major	Psalm	Choir and piano	c. 1852	♫	Setting of Psalm 23 in the Vulgata
WAB 35	Psalm 112	B♭ major	Psalm	Double choir (SSAATTBB) and orchestra	1863	♫	Setting of Psalm 113 in the Vulgata
WAB 36	Psalm 114	G major	Psalm	Choir (SAATB) and three trombones	1852	♫	Setting of Psalm 116 in the Vulgata
WAB 37	Psalm 146	A major	Psalm	Vocal quartet, Double choir (SSAATTBB), and orchestra	c. 1856	♫	Setting of verses one to 11 of Psalm 147 in the Vulgata
WAB 38	Psalm 150	C major	Psalm	Soprano, choir, and orchestra	1892	♫	Setting of Psalm 150
WAB 39	Requiem	D minor	Requiem	Vocal quartet, choir, one horn, three trombones, organ, and strings	1849	♫	Composed for the death anniversary of Franz Sailer. Slight revision in 1892.
WAB 40	Salvum fac populum tuum	F major	Offertorium	Choir	1884	♫	Setting of verses 22–30 of the Te Deum
WAB 41	Four Tantum ergo	B♭ major A♭ major E♭ major C major	Hymn	Choir and organ ad lib.	1846/1888	♫	Four settings of Tantum ergo. Version two of 1888 is a cappella. NB: The WAB ordering deviates from the ordering by the composer.
WAB 42	Tantum ergo	D major	Hymn	Choir (SSATB) and organ	1846/1888	♫	The fifth setting of Tantum ergo of 1846/1888
WAB 43	Tantum ergo	A major	Hymn	Choir and organ	c. 1845	♫	A setting of Tantum ergo
WAB 44	Tantum ergo	B♭ major	Hymn	Choir, two trumpets, organ, and two violins	c. 1854	♫	A setting of Tantum ergo
WAB 45	Te Deum	C major	Te Deum	Vocal quartet, choir, orchestra, and organ ad lib.	1881, 1884	♫	First-draft version: 1881, final version: 1884
WAB 46	Tota pulchra es	Phrygian mode	Antiphon	Tenor, choir, and organ	1878	♫	Tota pulchra es, a Marian antiphon
WAB 47	Totenlied No. 1	E♭ major	Elegy	Choir	1852	♫	First religious elegy for Josef Seiberl
WAB 48	Totenlied No. 2	F major	Elegy	Choir	1852	♫	Second religious elegy for Josef Seiberl
WAB 49	Trauungschor	F major	Weltliches Chorwerk	Vocal quartet, male choir, and organ	1865	♫	Lyrics by Franz Isidor Proschko. For the wedding celebration of Karl Kerschbaum with Maria Schimatschek
WAB 50	Veni Creator Spiritus	Gregorian mode	Gradual	Voice and organ	1884 at the latest	♫	Veni Creator Spiritus, a gradual for Pentecost
WAB 51	Vexilla regis	Phrygian mode	Hymn	Choir	1892	♫	Vexilla Regis, a Hymn for Passion Sunday and Good Friday
WAB 52	Virga Jesse	E minor	Gradual	Choir	1885	♫	Gradual for the celebration of the 100th anniversary of the Diocese of Linz
WAB 53	Vor Arneths Grab	F minor	Elegy	Male choir and three trombones	1854	♫	Elegy for prelate Michael Arneth. Lyrics by Ernst Marinelli. First three strophes reissued a cappella as Am Grabe (WAB 2)
WAB 54	Zur Vermählungsfeier	D major	Weltliches Chorwerk	Male choir	1878	♫	For the wedding celebration of Anton Ölzelt Ritter von Newin with Amalie Edler von Wieser
=== Secular choral music ===
WAB 55	Der Abendhimmel	A♭ major	Weltliches Chorwerk	Male quartet	1862	♫	Lyrics by Joseph Christian Freiherr von Zeidlitz, 1st setting
WAB 56	Der Abendhimmel	F major	Weltliches Chorwerk	Male choir	1866	♫	2nd setting
WAB 57	Abendzauber	G♭ major	Weltliches Chorwerk	3 yodelers, tenor or baritone, male choir and four horns	1878	♫	Lyrics by Heinrich von der Mattig
WAB 58	Wie bist du, Frühling, gut und treu	G major	Lied	Voice and piano	1856	♫	Also called Amaranths Waldeslieder. Lyrics from the poem Amaranth by Oskar von Redwitz.
WAB 59a	An dem Feste	D♭ major	Weltliches Chorwerk	Male choir	1843	♫	Lyrics by Alois Knauer. Reissued as Festlied (WAB 59b) and Tafellied (WAB 59c)
WAB 59b	Festlied	D major	Weltliches Chorwerk	Male choir	1928	♫	Transcription of An dem Feste (WAB 59a). Lyrics by Ludwig Carl Kraus. Not included in the Gesamtausgabe.
WAB 59c	Tafellied	D♭ major	Weltliches Chorwerk	Male choir	1893		Shortened reissue of An dem Feste (WAB 59a) with lyrics by Karl Ptak
WAB 60	Mayer Cantata Auf Brüder! auf, und die Saiten zur Hand!	D major	Cantata	Voices, male choir, choir, and winds	1855	♫	1st Name-day cantata for prelate Friedrich Mayer, lyrics by Ernst Marinelli
WAB 61a	Arneth Cantata Heil, Vater! Dir zum hohen Feste!	D major	Cantata	male quartet, Choir (SATTBB), three horns, two trumpets, and bass trombone	1852	♫	2nd Name-day cantata for prelate Michael Arneth. Lyrics by Ernst Marinelli. Wrongly put as second setting by Grasberger
WAB 61b	Auf Brüder! auf zur frohen Feier!	D major	Cantata	male quartet, Choir (SATTBB), three horns, two trumpets, and bass trombone	1857	♫	Second setting as 2nd Name-day cantata for prelate Friedrich Mayer. Lyrics by Ernst Marinelli. Wrongly put as first setting by Grasberger
WAB 61c	Heil Dir zum schönen Erstlingsfeste	D major	Cantata	male quartet, Choir (S A T T B B), three horns, two trumpets, and bass trombone	c. 1870		Reissue of the first setting for a Primizfeier (first Mass) in Kremsmünster. Lyrics by Beda Piringer. Not included in the Gesamtausgabe.
WAB 62	Des Dankes Wort sei mir vergönnt	F major	Weltliches Chorwerk	Tenor, bass, and male choir (TTTBB)	c. 1854	♫	Lyrics by Ernst Marinelli
WAB 63	Der deutsche Gesang (Das deutsche Lied)	D minor	Weltliches Chorwerk	Male choir, four horns, three trumpets, three trombones, and bass tuba	1892	♫	Lyrics by Erich Fels
WAB 64	Du bist wie eine Blume	F major	Weltliches Chorwerk	Vocal quartet	1861	♫	Lyrics by Heinrich Heine
WAB 65	Das edle Herz	A major	Weltliches Chorwerk	Male choir	c. 1851	♫	Lyrics by Ernst Marinelli
WAB 66	Das edle Herz	A major	Weltliches Chorwerk	Choir	1857	♫	2nd version for mixed choir
WAB 68	Frühlingslied	A major	Lied	Voice and piano	1851	♫	Lyrics by Heinrich Heine. For the Name-day of Aloisia Bogner
WAB 69	Die Geburt	D♭ major	Weltliches Chorwerk	Male choir	1851	♫	For the Name-day of Josef Seiberl
WAB 70	Germanenzug	D minor	Cantata	Male quartet, male choir and brass band (3 horns, four trumpets, two cornets, three trombones, euphonium and tuba)	1863–1864	♫	Secular cantata for a competition at the first Oberösterreichisches Sängerbundesfest. Lyrics by August Silberstein
WAB 71	Helgoland	G minor	Cantata	Male choir and orchestra with cymbals	1893	♫	Secular cantata to celebrate the 50th birthday of the Men's Choir of Vienna. Lyrics by August Silberstein
WAB 72	Herbstkummer	E minor	Lied	Tenor and piano	1864	♫	Lyrics by "Ernst"
WAB 73	Herbstlied	F♯ minor	Weltliches Chorwerk	2 sopranos, male choir, and piano	1864	♫	Lyrics by Friedrich von Sallet
WAB 74a	Das hohe Lied	A♭ major	Weltliches Chorwerk	Voices (TTB) and male choir	1876	♫	Lyrics by Heinrich von der Mattig (Pseudonym for Heinrich Wallmann) – 1st version a cappella
WAB 74b	Das hohe Lied	A♭ major	Weltliches Chorwerk	Voices (TTB) and male choir, strings and brass instruments	1879	♫	2nd version with accompaniment
WAB 75	Im April	A♭ major	Lied	Voice and piano	c. 1865	♫	Lyrics by Emanuel Geibel
WAB 76	Laßt Jubeltöne laut erklingen	E♭ major	Weltliches Chorwerk	Male choir, two horns, two trumpets, and four trombones	1854	♫	Festive song for the Joyous Entry of imperial bride Elisabeth in Linz. Lyrics by Hillischer.
WAB 77	Der Lehrerstand	E♭ major	Weltliches Chorwerk	Male choir	c. 1847	♫	Lyrics possibly by Ernst Marinelli
WAB 78	Das Lied vom deutschen Vaterland	D♭ major	Weltliches Chorwerk	Male choir	c. 1845	♫	
WAB 79	Mein Herz und deine Stimme	A major	Lied	Voice and piano	1868	♫	Lyrics by August von Platen
WAB 80	Mitternacht	A♭ major	Weltliches Chorwerk	Tenor, male choir, and piano	1869	♫	Lyrics by Joseph Mendelssohn
WAB 81a	Nachruf	C minor	Weltliches Chorwerk	Male choir and organ	1877	♫	Lyrics by Heinrich von der Mattig. Composed in memory of Josef Seiberl. Reissued as Trösterin Musik (WAB 81b)
WAB 81b	Trösterin Musik	C minor	Weltliches Chorwerk	Male choir and organ	1886	♫	Reissue of Nachruf (WAB 81a) with lyrics of August Seuffert
WAB 82	Sängerbund	C major	Weltliches Chorwerk	Male choir	1882	♫	Lyrics by Heinrich von der Mattig (?) and Karl Kerschbaum.
WAB 83/1	Ein jubelnd Hoch in Leid und Lust	D major	Weltliches Chorwerk	Male choir	1851	♫	The first of two mottos for the Liedertafel Eferding
WAB 83/2	Lebt wohl, ihr Sangesbrüder	A major	Weltliches Chorwerk	Male choir	1851	♫	The second of two mottos for the Liedertafel Eferding
WAB 84.1	Wie des Bächleins Silberquelle	G major	Lied	2 sopranos and piano	c. 1845	♫	Sketch for a lied (60 bars). Same lyrics as Ständchen (WAB 84.2)
WAB 84.2	Ständchen	G major	Weltliches Chorwerk	Tenor and male quartet	c. 1846	♫	Lyrics possibly by Ernst Marinelli
WAB 85	Sternschnuppen	F major	Weltliches Chorwerk	Male quartet	c. 1848	♫	Lyrics by Ernst Marinelli
WAB 87	Träumen und Wachen	A♭ major	Weltliches Chorwerk	Tenor and male choir	1890	♫	Lyrics by Franz Grillparzer
WAB 89	Um Mitternacht	F minor	Weltliches Chorwerk	Alto, male choir, and piano	1864	♫	1st setting. Lyrics by Robert Prutz
WAB 90	Um Mitternacht	F minor	Weltliches Chorwerk	Tenor and male choir	1886	♫	2nd setting
WAB 91	Vaterländisch Weinlied	C major	Weltliches Chorwerk	Male choir	1866	♫	Lyrics by August Silberstein
WAB 92	O könnt ich dich beglücken (Vaterlandslied)	A♭ major	Weltliches Chorwerk	Tenor, baritone, and male choir	1866	♫	Lyrics by August Silberstein
WAB 93a	Musikalischer Versuch nach dem Kammer-Styl	D major	Cantata	Vocal quartet, choir (SSAATTBB), and piano	1845	♫	Cantata composed in May 1845 as Lehrerbefähigungsprüfung (essay for teaching qualification)
WAB 93b	Musikalischer Versuch nach dem Kammer-Styl	D major	Cantata	Vocal quartet, choir (SSAATTBB), and piano	1845	♫	2nd setting as Name-day cantata for Alois Knauer, pastor of the Kronstorf church.
WAB 93c	Vergißmeinnicht	D major	Cantata	Vocal quartet, choir (SSAATTBB), and piano	1845	♫	"Don't forget me". Reissue of WAB 93b to remind Friedrich Mayer of his promises to appoint Bruckner in Sankt Florian
WAB 94a	Volkslied	C major	Lied	Voice and piano	1882	♫	Lyrics by Josef Winter, 1st setting
WAB 94b	Volkslied	C major	Weltliches Chorwerk	Male choir	1882	♫	2nd setting
WAB 95/1	Das Frauenherz, die Mannesbrust	A major	Weltliches Chorwerk	Choir	1868	♫	Motto for the Liedertafel Frohsinn. Lyrics by Karl Kerschbaum
WAB 95/2	Des Höchsten Preis, des Vaterlandes Ruhm	C major	Weltliches Chorwerk	Male choir	1868, possibly c. 1850	♫	Motto for the Liedertafel Sierning. Lyrics by Andreas Mittermayr
=== Orchestral works ===
WAB 96	March	D minor	March	Orchestra	1862	♫	Kitzler-Studienbuch, pp. 251–265
WAB 97	Three Orchestral Pieces	E♭ major E minor F major	Piece	Orchestra	1862	♫	Kitzler-Studienbuch, pp. 266–271; 272–277; 278–286
WAB 98	Overture	G minor	Overture	Orchestra with piccolo	1862–1863	♫	Two versions: 1862 and 1863 (modified coda at bars 233–288)
WAB 99	Symphony in F minor (Studiensymphonie)	F minor	Symphony	Orchestra	1863	♫	
WAB 100	Symphony in D minor (Die Nullte)	D minor	Symphony	Orchestra	1869	♫	
WAB 101	Symphony No. 1 (Das kecke Beserl)	C minor	Symphony	Orchestra	1865–1866	♫	1865: first concept Adagio & Scherzo; 1866 "Linz version", revised in 1877/1884; 1891 "Vienna version"
WAB 102	Symphony No. 2	C minor	Symphony	Orchestra	1872	♫	1872 version with Scherzo second and Adagio third, revised in 1873 and 1876; 1877 version, revised in 1892
WAB 103	Symphony No. 3 (Wagner Symphony)	D minor	Symphony	Orchestra	1873	♫	1873 version, revised in 1874; 1876 version, revised in 1877–1878: most Wagner quotations removed, coda added to the Scherzo (not retained later); 1889 version
WAB 104	Symphony No. 4 (Die Romantische)	E♭ major	Symphony	Orchestra	1874	♫	1874-1876 version; 1878 version: new "Hunting" Scherzo and "Volksfest" Finale; 1880 version: new Finale; 1888 version with piccolo and cymbals
WAB 105	Symphony No. 5	B♭ major	Symphony	Orchestra	1876–1878	♫	1876: first concept; revised in 1878
WAB 106	Symphony No. 6	A major	Symphony	Orchestra	1881	♫	
WAB 107	Symphony No. 7	E major	Symphony	Orchestra with Wagner tubas, triangle and cymbals	1883–1885	♫	1883: first concept; revised in 1885
WAB 108	Symphony No. 8 (Die Apokalyptische)	C minor	Symphony	Orchestra with Wagner tubas, triangle, cymbals and harps	1887	♫	1887 version; 1888 Adagio; 1890 version: 3rd woodwind in first three movements, fewer cymbal clashes in Adagio, harps in Trio.
WAB 109	Symphony No. 9	D minor	Symphony	Orchestra with Wagner tubas	1894–1896	♫	1894: first three movements; 1896: finale unfinished
=== Chamber music ===
WAB 110	Abendklänge	E minor	Duo	Piano and violin	1866	♫	A short Character piece
WAB 111	String Quartet	C minor	String quartet	String quartet	1862	♫	Kitzler-Studienbuch, pp. 165–196
WAB 112	String Quintet	F major	String quintet	Viola quintet	1879	♫	Slight revision in 1884.
WAB 113	Intermezzo in D minor	D minor	Intermezzo	Viola quintet	1879	♫	An alternative to the Scherzo of the String Quintet (WAB 112)
=== Brass ensemble music ===
WAB 114	Aequale No. 1	C minor	Aequale	3 trombones	1847	♫	For the funeral of Bruckner's aunt Rosalia Mayrhofer
WAB 115	~~Apollo March~~	E♭ major	March	Concert band	1862	♫	Actually a composition (Mazzuchelli March) by Béla Kéler, another pupil of Sechter. Used as model for the Military march (WAB 116).
WAB 116	Military march	E♭ major	March	Concert band	1865	♫	The Apollo March by Béla Kéler (WAB 115) was used as a model for this work.
=== Solo piano music ===
WAB 117	Erinnerung	A♭ major	Piece	Piano	1868	♫	
WAB 118	Fantasie	G major	Fantasia	Piano	1868	♫	A two-part piece signed for Alexandrine Soika. Part I: Langsam und mit Gefühl; Part II: Allegro
WAB 119	Klavierstück	E♭ major	Piece	Piano	c. 1856	♫	
WAB 120	Four Lancier-Quadrille	C major	Les Lanciers	Piano	c. 1850	♫	Compiled from popular operatic melodies for Aloisia Bogner
WAB 121	Quadrille	D major	Quadrille	Piano four hands	c. 1854	♫	6 parts: Pantalon, Été, Poule, Trénis, Pastourelle & Finale; signed for Marie Ruckensteiner
WAB 122	Steiermärker	G major	Piece	Piano	c. 1850	♫	A Ländler signed for Aloisia Bogner
WAB 123	Stille Betrachtung an einem Herbstabend	F♯ minor	Piece	Piano	1863	♫	Signed for Emma Thanner
WAB 124	Drei kleine Stücke	G major G major F major	Piece	Piano four hands	1853–1855	♫	Composed for the children of Josef Marböck
=== Music for organ ===
WAB 125	Fugue	D minor	Fugue	Organ	1861	♫	
WAB 126/1	Postlude	D minor	Postlude	Organ	c. 1846	♫	
WAB 126/2	Andante (Prelude)	D minor	Prelude	Organ	c. 1846	♫	
WAB 127	Three Preludes	E♭ major E♭ major D major	Prelude	Organ	c. 1835	♫	Doubtful authorship, possibly by Johann Baptist Weiss
WAB 128	Four Preludes	E♭ major	Prelude	Organ	c. 1835	♫	Doubtful authorship, possibly by Johann Baptist Weiss
WAB 129	Prelude (Perger Präludium)	C major	Prelude	Organ or harmonium	1884	♫	
WAB 131	Prelude and Fugue	C minor	Prelude and fugue	Organ	1847	♫	
=== Lost works ===
WAB 132	Litanies		Litany	Choir and brass	c. 1844		
WAB 133	Requiem		Requiem	Male choir and organ	1845		For the funeral of Bruckner's friend Johann Nepomuk Deschl
WAB 134	Salve Maria		Hymn		c. 1844		Marian hymn; possibly a Salve Regina
WAB 135	Zigeuner-Waldlied		Weltliches Chorwerk		1863		The foregoer in 3/4 time of Germanenzug (WAB 70)
=== Sketches ===
WAB 136	~~Domine, ad adjuvandum me festina~~	D major	Motet	Choir	1835	♫	Not by Bruckner, but Johann Baptist Weiss
WAB 138	Mild wie Bäche	A♭ major	Lied	Voice and piano	c. 1845	♫	Sketch for a lied (31 bars)
WAB 139	Mass	E♭ major	Mass	Choir, two oboes, three trombones, organ, and strings	c. 1846	♫	Sketch of Kyrie (58 bars)
WAB 140	Missa pro Quadragesima	G minor	Mass	Choir, three trombones and organ	c. 1845	♫	Mass for the Lent. Sketch of Kyrie (17 bars)
WAB 141	Requiem	D minor	Requiem		1875	♫	Sketch of the Introit (18 bars)
WAB 142	Symphony in B♭ major	B♭ major	Symphony	Orchestra	1869	♫	Sketch for first movement (68 bars)
=== Doubtful works ===
WAB 144	Herz Jesu-Lied	B♭ major	Motet	Choir and organ	c. 1846	♫	Authorship uncertain
WAB 145	O Du liebes Jesu-Kind	F major	Motet	Voice and organ	1845–1846	♫	Authorship uncertain
=== Addendum ===
WAB 146	Kronstorfer Messe	D minor	Mass	Choir	1843–1844	♫	A Missa brevis for the Lent composed in Kronstorf, also called Messe ohne Gloria (und Credo) (Mass without Gloria [and Credo]). Credo foreseen, but not composed.
WAB 147	Freier Sinn und froher Mut	D major	Weltliches Chorwerk	Male choir	1874	♫	Motto for the Gesangverein Liederkrans
WAB 148/1	Im Wort und Liede wahr und frei	C major	Weltliches Chorwerk	Male choir	1869	♫	The first of two mottos as posthumous respects for Simon Sechter. Lyrics by Johann Kajetan Markus
WAB 148/2	Wir alle jung und alt	D minor	Weltliches Chorwerk	Male choir	1869	♫	The second of two mottos as posthumous respects for Simon Sechter. Lyrics by Johann Kajetan Markus
WAB 149	Aequale No. 2	C minor	Aequale	3 trombones	1847	♫	For the funeral of Bruckner's aunt Rosalia Mayrhofer (see WAB 114). Missing score of bass-trombone completed by Hans Bauernfeind
== New attributions and findings == === Secular choral music ===
WAB 200	Der Mondabend	A major	Lied	Voice and piano	c. 1850	♫	Lyrics by Johann Gottfried Kumpf. Lied composed for Aloisia Bogner
WAB 201	Der Trompeter an der Katzbach	F minor	Lied	Voice and piano	1862		Kitzler-Studienbuch, pp. 207–213. Lyrics by Julius Mosen.
WAB 202	Des Baches Frühlingsfeier	D minor, A major	Lied	Voice and piano	1861		Kitzler-Studienbuch, p. 23.
WAB 203	Heut kommt ja Freund Klose zum Gause	C major	Weltliches Chorwerk	Vocal quartet	1889	♫	A canon for vocal quartet
WAB 204	Nachglück	C major	Lied	Voice and piano	1861		Kitzler-Studienbuch, 1st setting: p. 19.
WAB 205	O habt die Thräne gern	A minor	Lied	Voice and piano	1861		Kitzler-Studienbuch, 1st setting: pp. 18–19.
WAB 206	Vor der schlummernden Mutter	F major	Lied	Voice and piano	1861		Kitzler-Studienbuch, p. 22.
WAB 207	Wie neid ich Dich, du stolzer Wald	E♭ major	Lied	Voice and piano	1861		Kitzler-Studienbuch, p. 24.
=== Chamber music ===
WAB 208	Rondo in C minor	C minor	Rondo	String quartet	1862	♫	Alternative Rondo for the String quartet (WAB 111), Kitzler-Studienbuch, pp. 197–206
WAB 209	Six Scherzi	C major D minor A minor C major F major G minor	Scherzos	String quartet	1862		Kitzler-Studienbuch, pp. 58–74.
WAB 210	Thema und Variationen	E♭ major	Variations	String quartet	1862		Kitzler-Studienbuch, pp. 92–104.
=== Solo piano music ===
WAB 211	Two Andante für Klavier	E♭ major D minor	Piece	Piano	1862		Kitzler-Studienbuch, pp. 49–51.
WAB 212	Chromatische Etüde	F major	Étude	Piano	1862		Kitzler-Studienbuch, pp. 79–80.
WAB 213	Duo	A minor	Piece	Piano	1862		Kitzler-Studienbuch, p. 39
WAB 214	Etüde	G major	Étude	Piano	1862		Kitzler-Studienbuch, pp. 77–78.
WAB 215	Four Fantasien	D minor C minor E♭ major F major	Fantasias	Piano	1862		Kitzler-Studienbuch, pp. 213–218.
WAB 216	Five Klavierstücke	D minor G major B♭ major E♭ major E♭ major	Pieces	Piano	1862		Kitzler-Studienbuch, p. 225–227
WAB 217	Three Märsche	C major D minor F major	Marches	Piano	1862		Kitzler-Studienbuch, p. 36, 37, 41.
WAB 218	Mazurca	A minor	Mazurka	Piano	1862		Kitzler-Studienbuch, p. 29.
WAB 219	Menuett	C major	Minuet	Piano	1862		Kitzler-Studienbuch, p. 30.
WAB 220	Menuett mit Trio	G major	Minuet	Piano	1862		Kitzler-Studienbuch, p. 35.
WAB 221	Four Polka	C major	Polkas	Piano	1862		Kitzler-Studienbuch, p. 27–28.
WAB 222	Seven Rondo	G major C minor D minor F major G major E minor E♭ major	Rondos	Piano	1862		Kitzler-Studienbuch, p. 105–134.
WAB 223	Five Themen und Variationen	G major A major A major G major G major	Variations	Piano	1862		Kitzler-Studienbuch, p. 81–90.
WAB 224	Two Walzer	E♭ major C major	Waltz	Piano	1862		Kitzler-Studienbuch, p. 25–26.
=== Lost works ===
WAB 225	Three Stücke		Pieces		c. 1857		
WAB 226	Choral		Choral		1896		
WAB 227	Kyrie and Gloria	F major	Mass	Choir	1845		Extra Kyrie and Gloria for the Messe für den Gründonnerstag, WAB 9
WAB 228	Die Rose				c. 1885		A march or a lied, dedicated to Maria Wimmer
WAB 229	Irische Lieder		Lieder		c. 1846		
=== Sketches ===
WAB add 230	Intoitus ad Rorate	G major	Chorale		c. 1846		
WAB add 231	Es regnet	E minor	Lied	Voice and piano	1862		Kitzler-Studienbuch, pp. 46–47
WAB add 232	Herzeleid	E minor	Lied	Voice and piano	1861		Kitzler-Studienbuch, p. 20
WAB add 233	Kindliche Lieb	F major	Weltliches Chorwerk	male choir			
WAB add 234	Last des Herzens	E♭ major	Lied	Voice and piano	1862		Kitzler-Studienbuch, p. 43
WAB add 235	Nachglück	F major	Lied	Voice and piano	1861		Kitzler-Studienbuch, 2nd setting: p. 21
WAB add 236	O habt die Thräne gern	A minor	Lied	Voice and piano	1862		Kitzler-Studienbuch, 2nd setting: p. 42
WAB add 237	Und stehts dann still in seinem Lauf		Lied	Choir			
WAB add 238	Wunsch	D major	Lied	Voice and piano	1862		Kitzler-Studienbuch, pp. 47–48
WAB add 239	Galopp	C major	Galop	Piano	1862		Kitzler-Studienbuch, p. 29
WAB add 240	Improvisationsskizze Bad Ischl	C minor	Sketch	Organ	1890	♫	Based on the Finale of Symphony No. 1, Händel's Hallelujah and the Kaiserhymne
WAB add 241	Konzertskizze	C minor	Sketch	Organ	1884	♫	For a performance at Kremsmünster on 21 August 1884
WAB add 242	Five Sonatenentwürf	F minor C major C major F major D minor	Sketch	Piano	1862		Kitzler-Studienbuch, pp. 140–156
WAB add 243	Sonatensatz	G minor	Sonata	Piano	1862	♫	1st movement of a sonata, Kitzler-Studienbuch, pp. 157–164
WAB add 244	Symphonieentwürf	D minor	Sketches				
WAB add 245	Skizze zu einer Fuge	D minor	Fugue	Organ			
=== Adaptations & transcriptions (not exhaustive) ===
WAB add 263	Ännchen von Tharau	C major	Lied	Voice and piano	c. 1850		Folk song transcribed for Aloisia Bogner
WAB add 264	An dem Zauberschleier	D major	Lied	Voice and piano	c. 1850		Folk song transcribed for Aloisia Bogner
WAB add 265	Ecce quomodo moritur iustus	G minor	Responsory	Choir, organ, three trombones	1878		Accompaniment by trombones added to a responsory by Franz Joseph Aumann
WAB add 266	Orchestration of Beethoven's Sonate pathétique	C minor	Piece	Orchestra	1862	♫	Exercise in orchestration, Kitzler-Studienbuch, pp. 234–250
WAB add 267	Segenlied	E♭ major	Lied	Organ			Harmonisation of a blessing song by Norbert Hauner or Michael Haydn
WAB add 268	Tenebrae factae sunt	G minor	Responsory	Choir, organ, three trombones	1878		Accompaniment by trombones added to a responsory by Franz Joseph Aumann
WAB add 321	Walzer	G major	Lied	Voice and piano	c. 1850		Folk song Juheisa juhei, ihr Tänzer herbei transcribed for Aloisia Bogner
=== Incerta & falsa ===
WAB add 330	Exaudi	G major		Choir, trombones			Possibly by Franz Joseph Aumann
WAB add 331	Four sketches from Amaranth	C major C major C major B♭ major	Lied	Voice			Possibly by Ernst Friedrich Eduard Richter. Lyrics from the poem Amaranth by Oskar von Redwitz
WAB add 332	Symphonisches Präludium	C minor	Prelude	Orchestra	1875–1876		Doubtful authorship, possibly an exercise in orchestration for Rudolf Krzyzanowski
WAB add 333	~~Pange lingua~~	C major	Hymn	Choir			Not a composition by Bruckner, but by Franz Joseph Aumann
WAB add 334	Präludienbuch		Pieces	Organ			Bruckner's Präludienbuch with 22 organ pieces. Authorship very uncertain

== Sources ==
- Renate Grasberger, Werkverzeichnis Anton Bruckner (WAB), Publikationen des Instituts für österreichische Musikdokumentation, Hans Schneider, Tutzing, 1977 – ISBN 3-7952-0232-9
- Uwe Harten, Anton Bruckner. Ein Handbuch. Residenz Verlag, Salzburg, 1996. ISBN 3-7017-1030-9.
- Anton Bruckner – Sämtliche Werke, Band XXIII/1: Lieder für Gesang und Klavier (1851–1882), Musikwissenschaftlicher Verlag der Internationalen Bruckner-Gesellschaft, Angela Pachovsky (Editor), Vienna, 1997
- Anton Bruckner – Sämtliche Werke, Band XXIII/2: Weltliche Chorwerke (1843–1893), Musikwissenschaftlicher Verlag der Internationalen Bruckner-Gesellschaft, Angela Pachovsky (Editor), Vienna, 2001
- Anton Bruckner – Sämtliche Werke, Band XXV: Kitzler-Studienbuch (1861–1863), facsimile, Musikwissenschaftlicher Verlag der Internationalen Bruckner-Gesellschaft, Paul Hawkshaw and Erich Wolfgang Partsch (Editors), Vienna, 2015
- Derek Watson, Bruckner, Master Musicians Series, J. M. Dent & Sons Ltd, London, 1996. ISBN 978-0-19-816618-4
- Cornelis van Zwol, Anton Bruckner 1824–1896 – Leven en werken, uitg. Thoth, Bussum, Netherlands, 2012. ISBN 978-90-6868-590-9
