= Libera me (disambiguation) =

Libera me /Libera me, Domine ("Deliver me, my God") is a Roman Catholic responsory that is sung in the Office of the Dead and at the absolution of the dead.

Libera me may also refer to:

Music

- Libera me, WAB 21, 1843 motet by Anton Bruckner
- Libera me, WAB 22, 1854 motet by Anton Bruckner
- Libera Me (album), 2008 album by DarkSun

Film

- Libera me (1993 film), French experimental film directed by Alain Cavalier
- Libera Me (2000 film), South Korean action film
