= Two Asperges me, WAB 3 =

1845 motets composed by Anton Bruckner

Two Asperges me
- Motets by Anton Bruckner
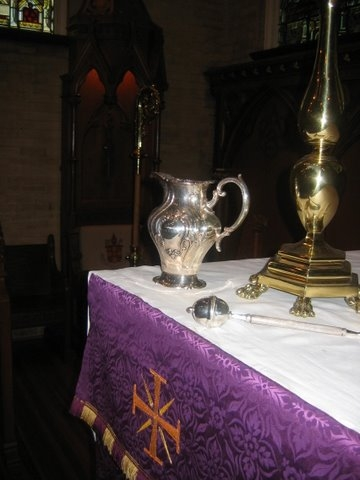
- Pitcher and aspergilium for the Asperges
- Key: Aeolian mode - F major
- Catalogue: WAB 3
- Form: Antiphon
- Text: Asperges me
- Language: Latin
- Composed: 1844/1845: Kronstorf
- Dedication: Asperges
- Published: 1932: Regensburg
- Vocal: SATB choir
- Instrumental: Organ

The two Asperges me (Thou wilt sprinkle me), WAB 3, are sacred motets composed by Anton Bruckner. They are settings of the Latin Asperges me, the antiphon used for the celebration of Asperges.

== History ==
In 1844/1845, Bruckner composed these two settings of Aperges me during his stay in Kronstorf. They were presumably performed at that time.

The manuscripts are stored in the Österreichische Nationalbibliothek. The two motets were first published in band II/2, pp. 67–76 of the Göllerich/Auer biography. They are put in Band XXI/6 of the Gesamtausgabe.

== Music ==
During his stay in Kronstorf Bruckner, composed these two settings of the Asperges me for mixed choir and organ (1844/1845). As for the former Asperges me, the incipit ("Asperges me") is not composed and has to be intoned by the priest in Gregorian mode before the choir is going on. It is the first composition, at the end of which Bruckner has put his signature.

=== Asperges me, WAB 3.1 ===
The work, a setting of 58 bars in Aeolian mode, was composed for the Asperges of Septuagesima Sunday till the 4th Sunday of Lent.

The score is in three parts. Part 1 (19 bars), which begins with "Domine, hysopo" and ends with "dealbabor", is in fugato. Part 2 (25 bars), which follows with the remaining of the text and the doxology till "Spiritui Sancto", is sung in unison with organ accompaniment. Part 3 (14 bars), which begins in canon, goes on till the end of the doxology.

=== Asperges me, WAB 3.2 ===
The work, a setting of 41 bars in F major was composed for the Asperges of Passion Sunday, does not include the doxology.

The score is in three parts. Part 1 (16 bars), sung in homophony, begins with "Domine, hysopo" and ends with "dealbabor". Part 2 (7 bars) follows with the remaining of the text a cappella in Gregorian mode. After a repeat of the incipit (2 bars), part 3 is a modified repeat of the first part.

== Discography ==
=== Asperges me, WAB 3.1 ===
There is only one commercial recording in full accordance with the score:

- Erwin Ortner, Arnold Schoenberg Chor, Anton Bruckner: Tantum ergo - CD: ASC Edition 3, Issue of the choir, 2008

=== Asperges me, WAB 3.2 ===
There is only one commercial recording:

- Balduin Sulzer, Chor des Musikgymnasiums Linz, Musik aus der Stifterstraße – LP: Extempore AD-80.01/2, 1980 (sung fully a cappella)

== Sources ==
- August Göllerich, Anton Bruckner. Ein Lebens- und Schaffens-Bild, c. 1922 – posthumous edited by Max Auer by G. Bosse, Regensburg, 1932
- James Garrat, Palestrina and the German Romantic Imagination, Cambridge University Press, Cambridge, 2004. ISBN 0-521-80737-9
- Anton Bruckner – Sämtliche Werke, Band XXI: Kleine Kirchenmusikwerke, Musikwissenschaftlicher Verlag der Internationalen Bruckner-Gesellschaft, Hans Bauernfeind and Leopold Nowak (Editor), Vienna, 1984/2001
- Cornelis van Zwol, Anton Bruckner 1824–1896 – Leven en werken, uitg. Thoth, Bussum, Netherlands, 2012. ISBN 978-90-6868-590-9
- Uwe Harten, Anton Bruckner. Ein Handbuch. Residenz Verlag, Salzburg, 1996. ISBN 3-7017-1030-9.
