= Asperger =

Asperger or Asperger's may refer to:

- Asperger syndrome, a former diagnosis (DSM-5) affecting social and communication skills
- Hans Asperger (1906–1980), Austrian pediatrician with ties to eugenics after whom Asperger syndrome is named
- Asperger's Are Us, the first comedy troupe formed by people with Asperger syndrome

== See also ==
- "Ass Burgers", South Park episode about Asperger syndrome
- Asperg, a town in Baden-Württemberg, Germany
- Asperges, a Christian rite of sprinkling holy water
  - Aspergillum, a liturgical implement used to sprinkle holy water
  - "Asperges me", a Latin antiphon said or sung at the Asperges
- Aspergillus, a genus of several hundred mold species
- Cynthia Ashperger
- High-functioning autism and Asperger's editors, a Wikipedia essay about editors with Asperger's syndrome
