= An dem Feste, WAB 59a =

Song composed by Anton Bruckner

An dem Feste
- Secular choral work by Anton Bruckner
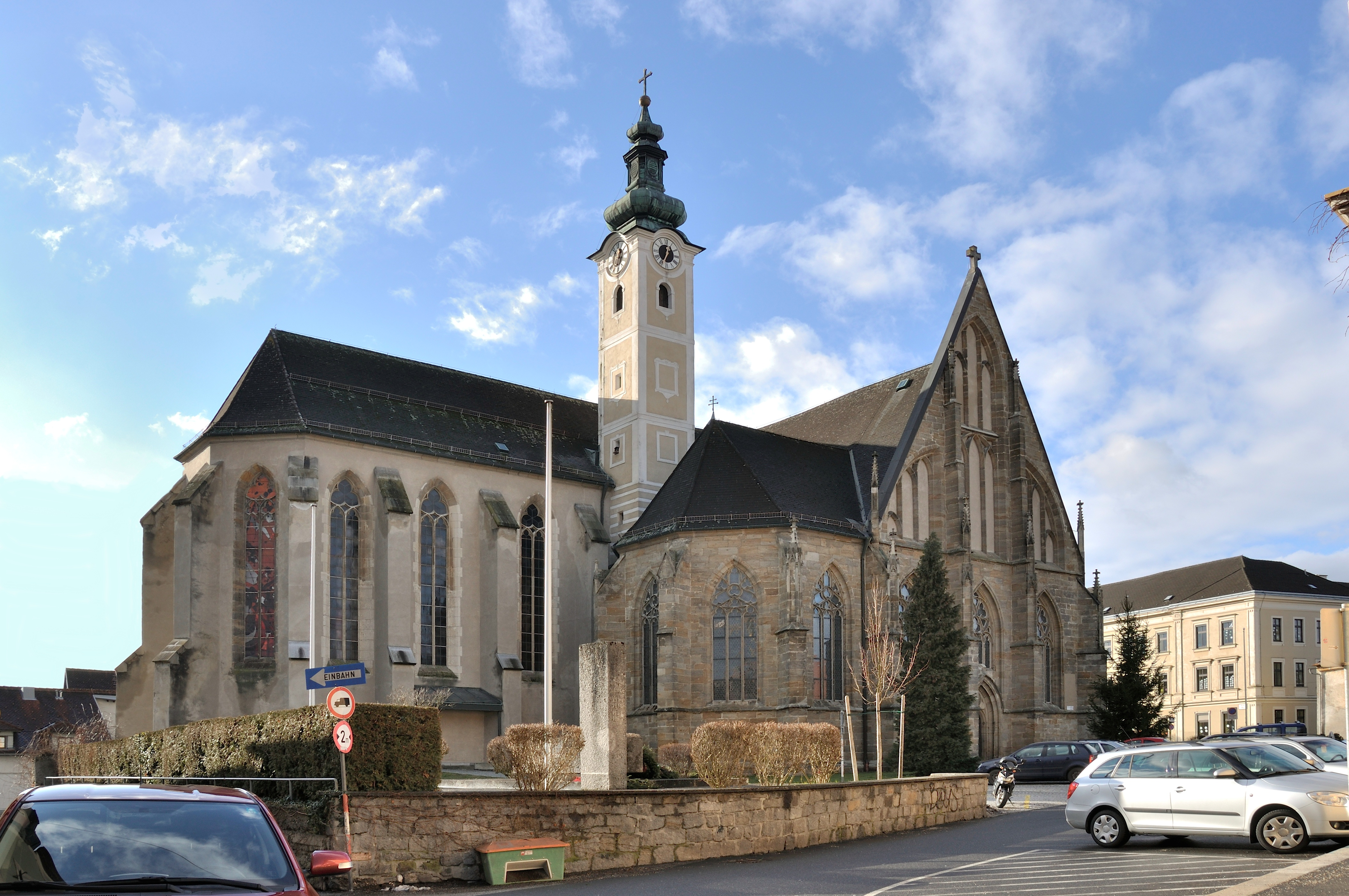
- The city church of Enns
- Key: D-flat major
- Catalogue: WAB 59a
- Text: Alois Knauer
- Language: German
- Composed: 1843: Kronstorf
- Dedication: Josef Ritter von Pessler
- Published: 1932: Regensburg
- Vocal: TTBB choir

"An dem Feste" (At the feast), WAB 59a, is a song composed by the 19-year-old Anton Bruckner in 1843 during his stay as schoolteacher's assistant in Kronstorf. In 1893, near the end of his life, Bruckner modified slightly its music score and let Karl Ptak put another text on the song, with as title "Tafellied" (Table song), WAB 59c.

== History ==
Bruckner composed this youth work on a five-strophe text of the parish priest of Kronstorf, Alois Knauer, in 1843, during his stay as schoolteacher's assistant. He dedicated it to Josef Ritter von Pessler, the parish priest of Enns. The work was performed on 19 September 1843 in the church of Enns. The work, of which the original manuscript is stored in the archive of the Stadt- und Landsbibliothek (City and province library) of Vienna, was first issued in Band I, pp. 231-233, of the Göllerich/Auer biography. The original setting of An dem Feste and a variant for mixed choir are issued in Band XXIII/2, No. 1 of the Gesamtausgabe.

=== Tafellied ===
Near the end of his life, Bruckner let Karl Ptak put another text on the song and modified slightly its music score, with as title Tafellied (Table song), WAB 59c. The revised song, the composition of which was finished on 22 February 1893, was performed by the Wiener Akademisches Gesanverein (Choral association of the university of Vienna) on 11 March 1893. Tafellied is issued in Band XXIII/2, No. 36 of the Gesamtausgabe.

=== Later issues ===
In 1928, Anton Böhm & Sohn issued a new version of Bruckner's popular song transposed to D major with a text by Ludwig Carl Kraus (Freudig laßt das Lied erschallen in der hehren Feierstund), with the title Festlied (Festive song). This new issue of the song, which was originally classified by Renate Grasberger as WAB 67, is now put as WAB 59b.
Two years later (1930), Anton Böhm & Sohn issued again a new version in C major for mixed choir with a text by Alfred Zehelein (Heil dem Feste, das uns heute traut im engen Kreis vereint).

== Text ==
An dem Feste uses a text by Alois Knauer.

An dem Feste, das uns heute
Zu dem frohen Kreis vereint,
Wallt empor das Herz in Freude,
Das es liebend edel meint.
Er, den wir mit Recht verehren,
Unser Hirt und Hirtenhirt,
Auf der Pilgerbahn, der schweren,
Die durch Labyrinthe führt.

At the feast, which today
Unites us as a happy group,
Our hearts exult in joy,
In a loving noble intention.
He, whom we rightfully venerate,
Our shepherd and shepherd of the shepherds
On the difficult voyage of pilgrimage,
Which leads us though labyrinths.

== Music ==
The 20-bar long work (16 bars plus repeat of the last 4 bars) in D-flat major, which is scored for TTBB choir, uses five strophes. There is also a setting for SABB choir.
The revised, 16-bar long Tafellied uses three strophes.

== Discography ==
=== An dem Feste ===
There is a single recording of the original setting :

- Thomas Kerbl, Männerchorvereinigung Bruckner 12, Weltliche Männerchöre – CD: LIVA 054, 2012 – 1st and 5th strophes

== Sources ==
- August Göllerich, Anton Bruckner. Ein Lebens- und Schaffens-Bild, c. 1922 – posthumous edited by Max Auer by G. Bosse, Regensburg, 1932
- Anton Bruckner – Sämtliche Werke, Band XXIII/2: Weltliche Chorwerke (1843–1893), Musikwissenschaftlicher Verlag der Internationalen Bruckner-Gesellschaft, Angela Pachovsky and Anton Reinthaler (Editor), Vienna, 1989
- Cornelis van Zwol, Anton Bruckner 1824–1896 – Leven en werken, uitg. Thoth, Bussum, Netherlands, 2012. ISBN 978-90-6868-590-9
- Uwe Harten, Anton Bruckner. Ein Handbuch. Residenz Verlag, Salzburg, 1996. ISBN 3-7017-1030-9.
- Crawford Howie, Anton Bruckner - A documentary biography, online revised edition
