= Libera me, WAB 21 =

1843 motet composed by Anton Bruckner

Libera me
- Motet by Anton Bruckner
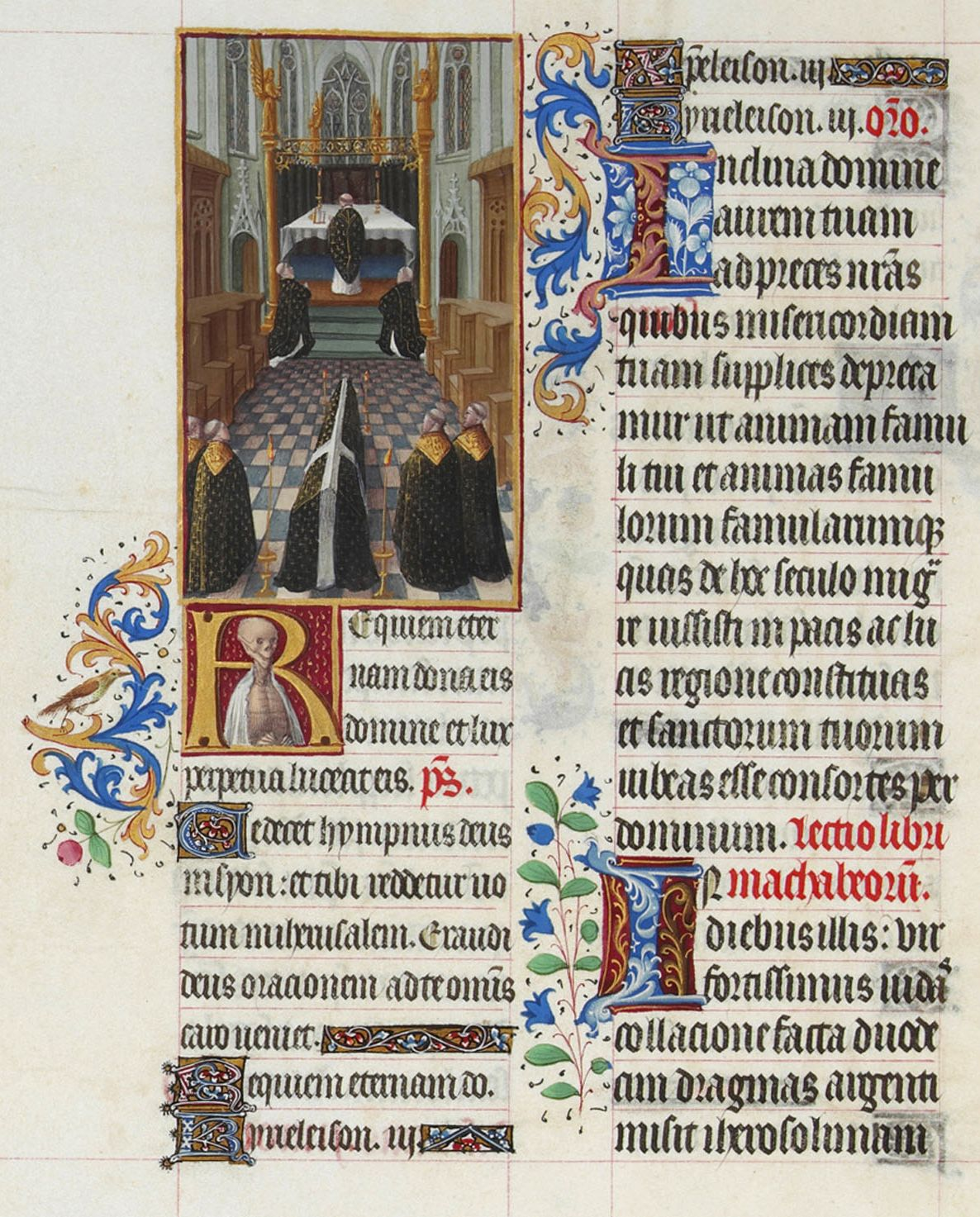
- L'Office des morts (Les très Riches Heures du Duc de Berry), Musée Condé, Chantilly
- Key: F major
- Catalogue: WAB 21
- Form: Absoute
- Text: Libera me
- Language: Latin
- Composed: c. 1843: Kronstorf
- Published: 1932: Regensburg
- Vocal: SATB choir
- Instrumental: Organ

Libera me (Deliver me), WAB 21, is the first of two settings of the absoute Libera me, composed by Anton Bruckner in c. 1843.

== History ==
Bruckner composed the motet during his stay in Kronstorf. The work was presumably performed at that time.

The original manuscript is lost, but there are two good copies, one made by Max Auer (Kronstorf, 1903). The motet was first published in band I, pp. 243–248 of the Göllerich/Auer biography. It is put in Band XXI/3 of the Gesamtausgabe.

== Music ==
The work is scored in F major for mixed choir and organ. In this youth work, two parts of the responsory are not included: the second "Quando caeli movendi sunt et terra" and the second "Dum veneris iudicare saeculum per ignem".

== Discography ==
There are a few recordings of this first setting of Libera me:

- Joseph Pancik, Prager Kammerchor, Anton Bruckner: Motetten / Choral-Messe – CD: Orfeo C 327 951 A, 1993 - transcription a cappella with repeat of the first verse
- Dan-Olof Stenlund, Malmö Kammarkör, Bruckner: Ausgewählte Werke – CD: Malmö Kammarkör MKKCD 051, 2004
- Thomas Kerbl, Chorvereinigung Bruckner 09, Anton Bruckner: Chöre/Klaviermusik – CD: LIVA 034, 2009
- Łukasz Borowicz, Anton Bruckner: Requiem, RIAS Kammerchor Berlin, Akademie für Alte Musik Berlin – CD: Accentus ACC30474, 2019 - Cohrs edition with revised organ accompaniment and repeat of the first verse
- Sigvards Klava, Latvian Radio Choir, Bruckner: Latin Motets, 2019 – CD Ondine OD 1362
- Christian Erny, The Zurich Chamber Singers, Bruckner Spectrum - CD: Berlin Classics LC06203, 2022

== Sources ==
- August Göllerich, Anton Bruckner. Ein Lebens- und Schaffens-Bild, c. 1922 – posthumous edited by Max Auer by G. Bosse, Regensburg, 1932
- Anton Bruckner – Sämtliche Werke, Band XXI: Kleine Kirchenmusikwerke, Musikwissenschaftlicher Verlag der Internationalen Bruckner-Gesellschaft, Hans Bauernfeind and Leopold Nowak (Editor), Vienna, 1984/2001
- Cornelis van Zwol, Anton Bruckner 1824–1896 – Leven en werken, uitg. Thoth, Bussum, Netherlands, 2012. ISBN 978-90-6868-590-9
- Uwe Harten, Anton Bruckner. Ein Handbuch. Residenz Verlag, Salzburg, 1996. ISBN 3-7017-1030-9.
