= Vergißmeinnicht, WAB 93 =

1845 cantata by Anton Bruckner

Vergißmeinnicht
- by Anton Bruckner
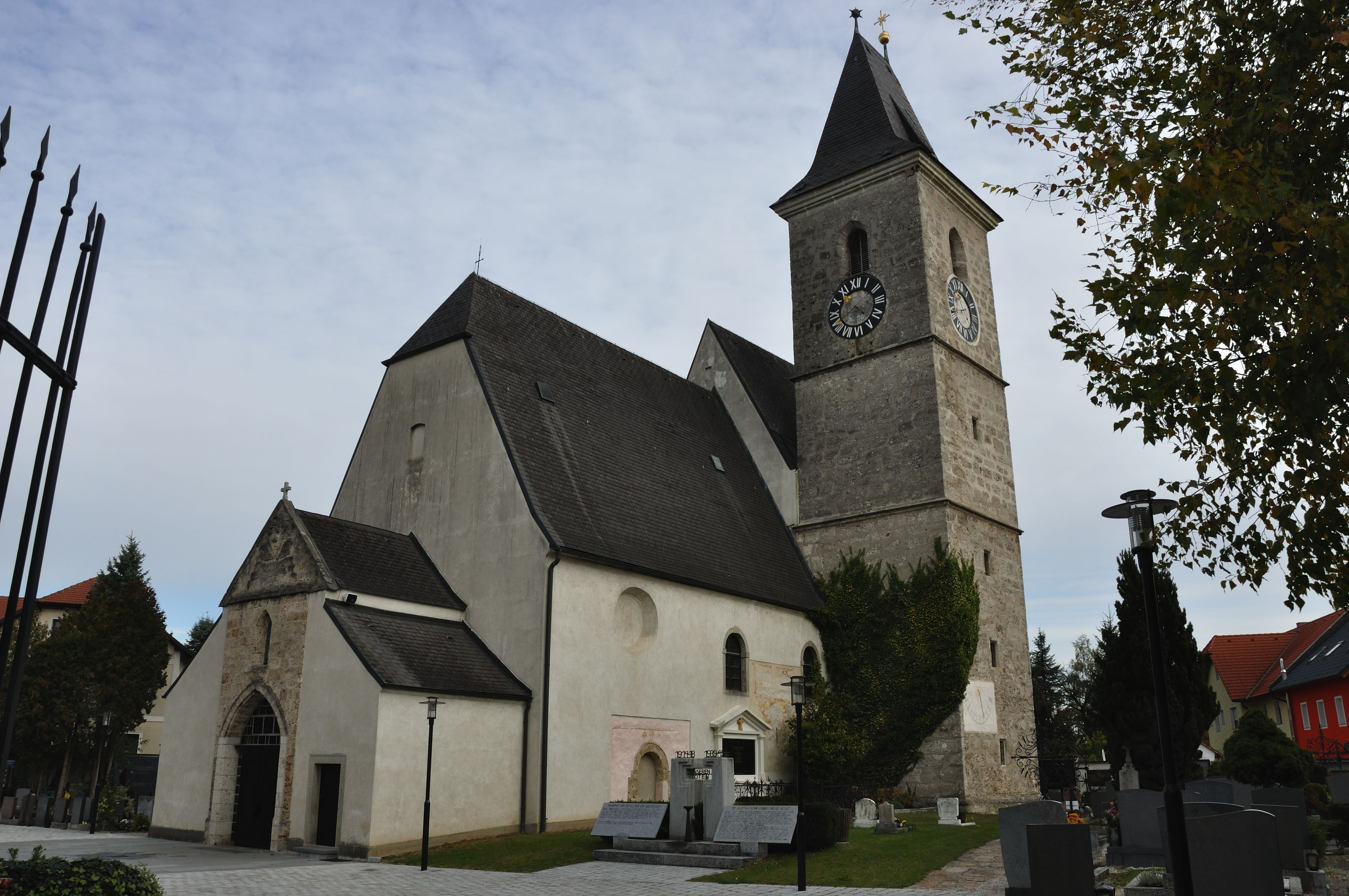
- Bartholomäus and Katharina church, Kronstorf
- Key: D major
- Catalogue: WAB 93
- Form: Cantata
- Language: German
- Composed: 1845: Kronstorf
- Dedication: 2nd version: Alois Knauer; 3rd version: Friedrich Mayer
- Vocal: SSAATTBB choir – SATB soloists
- Instrumental: Piano

Vergißmeinnicht (Forget-me-not), WAB 93, is a cantata composed by Anton Bruckner in 1845.

== History ==
When he stayed in Kronstorf, Bruckner composed in 1845 the first version of this cantata as Musikalischer Versuch nach dem Kammer-Styl (Musical essay in chamber style), which he signed as Candidatus (candidate) for his Lehrbefähigungsprüfung (teacher aggregation). Bruckner's examination, which was held in Linz on 27 and 28 May 1845, was successful.

A slightly modified, second version was dedicated to Alois Knauer, the parish priest of Kronstorf. The performance occurred on 21 June 1845 (Knauer's name day) or the evening before.

The third version, entitled Vergißmeinnicht (Forget-me-not), was sent to Friedrich Mayer, who was at that time prebendary and choirmaster of the St. Florian Abbey, to remind him of the promise to provide Bruckner with an employment in the Abbey after his successful teacher examination. It is not known when it was performed.

The manuscripts of the first and second versions are stored at the Österreichische Nationalbibliothek. The manuscript of the third version is stored in the archive of the St. Florian Abbey. A facsimile of the third version was first issued in band I, pp. 286–300 of the Göllerich/Auer biography.

The three versions of the cantata are put in Band XXII/1 No. 1 of the Gesamtausgabe.

== Text ==
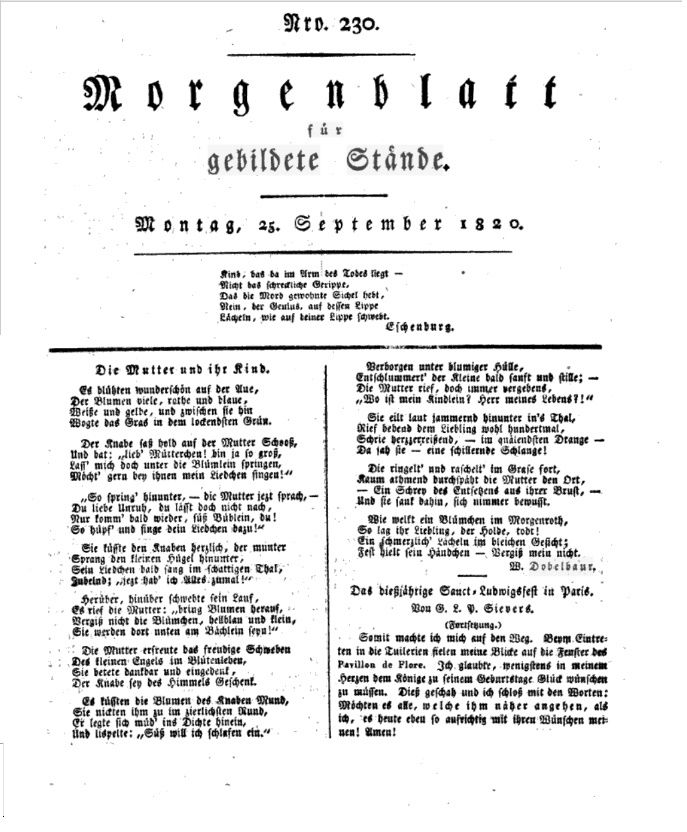
Morgenblatt, 25 September 1820, with W. Dobelbaur's text

The work is based on the eleven-strophe poem Die Mutter und ihr Kind (The mother and her child) by W. Dobelbaur.

Es blühten wunderschön auf der Aue,
Der Blumen viele, rothe und blaue,
Weiße und gelbe, und zwischen sie hin
Wogte das Gras in dem lockendsten Grün.

Der Knabe saß hold auf der Mutter Schooß,
Und bat: „Lieb' Mütterchen! Bin ja so groß,
Laß' mich doch unter die Blümlein springen,
Möcht' gern bey ihnen mein Liedchen singen!“.

„So spring' hinunter, – die Mutter jetzt sprach, –
Du liebe Unruh, du lässt doch nicht nach,
Nur komm' bald wieder, süß Büblein, du!
So hüpf' und singe dein Liedchen dazu!“

Sie küsste den Knaben herzlich, der munter
Sprang den kleinen Hügel hinunter,
Sein Liedchen bald sang im schattigen Thal,
Jubelnd; „jetzt hab' ich Alles zumal!“

Herüber, hinüber schwebte sein Lauf,
Es rief die Mutter: „bring Blumen herauf,
Vergiß nicht die Blümchen, hellblau und klein,
Sie werden dort unten am Bächlein seyn!“

Die Mutter erfreute das freudige Schweben
Des kleinen Engels im Blütenleben,
Sie betete dankbar und eingedenk,
Der Knabe sey des Himmels Geschenk.

Es küssten die Blumen des Knaben Mund,
Sie nickten ihm zu im zierlichsten Rund,
Er legte sich müd' ins Dichte hinein,
Und lispelte: „Süß will ich schlafen ein.“

Verborgen unter blumiger Hülle,
Entschlummert' der Kleine bald sanft und stille; –
Die Mutter rief, doch immer vergebens,
„Wo ist mein Kindlein? Herr meines Lebens?!“

Sie eilt laut jammernd hinunter in's Thal
Rief bebend dem Liebling wohl hundertmal,
Schrie herzzerreißend, – im quälendsten Drange –
Da sah sie – ein schillernde Schlange!

Die ringelt' und raschelt' im Grase fort,
Kaum athmend durchspäht die Mutter den Ort,
– Ein Schrey des Entsetzens aus ihrer Brust, –
Und sie sank dahin, sich nimmer bewusst.

Wie welkt ein Blümchen im Morgenroth,
So lag ihr Liebling, der Holde, todt!
Ein schmerzlich' Lächeln im bleichen Gesicht;
Fest hielt sein Händchen – Vergiß mein nicht.

Wonderfully blossoming on the meadow
were many flowers, red and blue,
White and yellow, and among them
The grass rippled in the most alluring green.

The lovely boy sat on his mother's lap,
And asked: “Dear mom, I am grown enough,
Let me jump among the little flowers,
I want to sing my little song to them!”

“So jump down”, said the mother then,
“Restless you, you will not cease,
But come back soon, sweet little boy!
So jump and sing your little song!”

She kissed the boy heartily, who jumped
Sprightly down the little hill,
Soon he sang his little song in the shady valley,
Jubilant; “Now I have everything!“

Up and down floated his song.
His mother called: “Bring up flowers,
Do not forget the flowers, light blue and small,
They will be down there along the creek!”

The mother enjoyed the joyful floating
Of the little angel among the flowers,
She prayed thankfully, mindful
That the boy was a gift from Heaven.

The flowers kissed the boy's mouth,
They nodded to him in a dainty round,
He laid down exhausted among them,
And whispered: “I will go to sweet sleep.”

Hidden under the flowery cover,
The boy fell soon sweet and silent asleep;
The mother called, but always in vain,
“Where is my little child, Lord of my life?”

She hurries, whining loudly, down to the valley,
Called shuddering her darling hundred times,
Cried heartbreakingly, in tormenting urge.
There she saw – a shimmering snake!

It curled and rustled away through the grass,
Barely breathing, the mother spied at the place,
A cry of horror from her breast,
And she sank down, unconscious.

Like a wilted flower in the dawn,
So lay her lovely darling dead!
With a painful smile in his pale face,
His little hand held firmly – forget-me-not.

== Setting ==
The cantata in D major is scored for SSAATTBB choir, SATB soloists and piano. The 149-bar long work is in seven movements:

1. Eingangschor: Es blühten wunderschön auf der Aue - four-part mixed choir
2. Recitative: Der Knabe saß hold auf der Mutter Schooß - soprano and alto
3. Arie: Sie küsste den Knaben herzlich - soprano and alto
4. Duet: Die Mutter erfreute das freudige Schweben - soprano and alto, Allegro
5. Quartet: Verborgen unter blumiger Hülle - soprano, alto, tenor and bass
6. Duet: Die ringelt' und raschelt' im Grase fort - tenor and bass, Moderato
7. Schlußchor: Wie welkt ein Blümchen im Morgenroth - eight-part mixed choir a cappella, Andante

The third version is 7 bars shorter (142 bars), and the first duet: soprano and alto, is replaced by a duet: soprano and tenor.

== Sources ==
- August Göllerich, Anton Bruckner. Ein Lebens- und Schaffens-Bild, c. 1922 – posthumous edited by Max Auer by G. Bosse, Regensburg, 1932
- Uwe Harten, Anton Bruckner. Ein Handbuch. Residenz Verlag, Salzburg, 1996. ISBN 3-7017-1030-9
- Anton Bruckner – Sämtliche Werke, Band XXII/1: Kantaten und Chorwerke I (1845–1855), Musikwissenschaftlicher Verlag der Internationalen Bruckner-Gesellschaft, Franz Burkhart, Rudolf H. Führer and Leopold Nowak (Editor), Vienna, 1987 (Available on IMSLP: Neue Gesamtausgabe, XXII/1. Kantaten und Chorwerke Teil 1: Nr. 1-5)
- Cornelis van Zwol, Anton Bruckner 1824–1896 – Leven en werken, uitg. Thoth, Bussum, Netherlands, 2012. ISBN 978-90-6868-590-9
- Crawford Howie, Anton Bruckner - A documentary biography, online revised edition

A rendition of the cantata using a notation software can be heard on Vergissmeinnicht, WAB 93c – entire chorus practice
