= Abendzauber, WAB 57 =

1878 song composed by Anton Bruckner

Abendzauber
- Secular choral work by Anton Bruckner
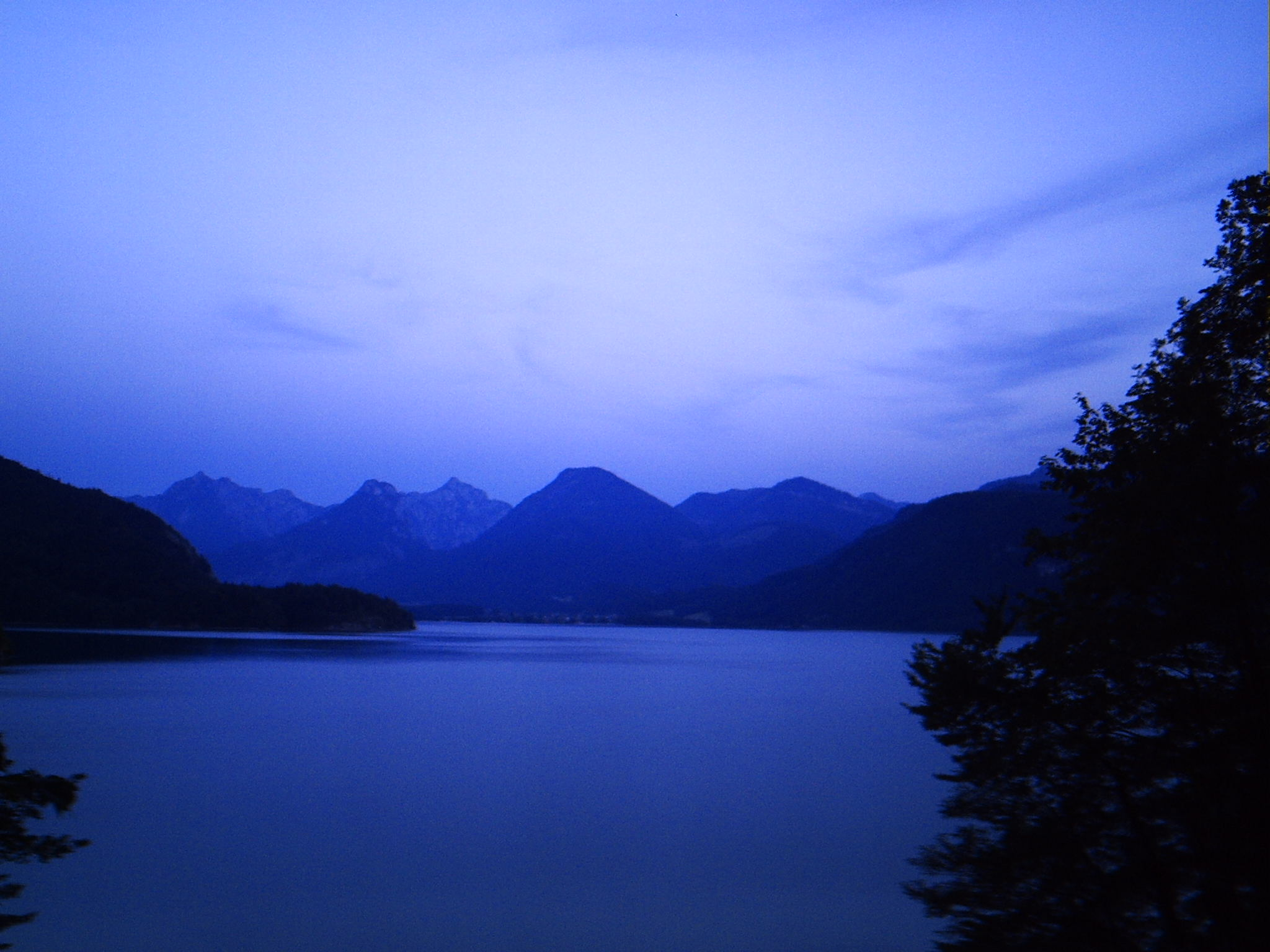
- The Wolfgangsee in the evening
- Key: G♭ major
- Catalogue: WAB 57
- Text: Heinrich von der Mattig
- Language: German
- Composed: 13 January 1878: Vienna
- Dedication: Carl Almeroth
- Published: 1911: Vienna
- Vocal: TTBB choir, "yodelers", and tenor or baritone soloist
- Instrumental: Four horns

Abendzauber (Evening magic), WAB 57, is a song composed by Anton Bruckner in 1878.

== History ==
Bruckner composed the song on a text of Heinrich von der Mattig on 13 January 1878. He dedicated it to Carl Almeroth. The piece was not performed during the composer's life, because of its performance difficulties (humming voices). It was first performed in 1911 by Viktor Keldorfer with the Wiener Männergesang-Verein (Vienna men's choral association), and was thereafter published by the Universal Edition. It was very popular with Austrian choirs during the interbellum.

The work, of which the original manuscript is stored in the archive of the Wiener Männergesang-Verein, is issued in Band XXIII/2, No. 29 of the Gesamtausgabe.

== Text ==
Abendzauber uses a text by Heinrich von der Mattig.

Der See träumt zwischen Felsen,
Es flüstert sanft der Hain.
Den Bergeshang beleuchtet
Des Mondes Silberschein.

Und aus dem Waldesdunkel
Hallt Nachtigallensang,
Und von dem See weh’n Lieder
Mit zauberhaftem Klang.

Ich saß am Seegestade,
Vertieft in süßen Traum;
Da träumte ich zu schweben
Empor zum Himmelsraum.

Wer könnte je vergessen
Den wonnevollen Ort!
Noch tief im Herzen klingen
Die Zaubertöne fort.

The lake dreams between rocks,
The forest whispers gently.
The mountain slope is lit
By the silvery light of the moon.

From the darkness of the forest,
Sounds the song of the nightingale,
And from the lake, songs float
With enchanting sound.

I sat at the lakeshore,
Lost in sweet dream;
I dreamed to hover
Aloft to Heaven's realm.

Who could ever forget
This delightful place!
Deep in my heart
The enchanting tones still sound.

== Music ==
The 82-bar long work in G♭ major is scored for TTBB choir, tenor or baritone soloist. Similarly to Das hohe Lied, the first part (58 bars) is sung by the soloist with an accompaniment of humming voices. From "Wer könnte je vergessen", the melody is taken over by the choir. In addition, four horns are figuring Alphorns, and a Ferngesang (chant from a distance) of female voices is figuring yodelers.

The song, which is in the line of Mitternacht, WAB 80, and the two settings of Um Mitternacht (WAB 89 and 90), is a remarkable example of nature imagery. Bruckner's specialist Ernst Kurth considers this original, somewhat odd piece as one Bruckner's most romantic works.

== Selected discography ==
The first recording of Abendzauber was by Bryan Fairfax, with Alfred Orda (tenor), the BBC Chorus and the horns of the London Symphony Orchestra, Szymanowski - Bruckner - Schumann. A Choral Anthology – CD: Symposium Records 1423 (4 September 1960)

A selection of the few other recordings:

- Rolf Beck, Markus Krause (baritone), Süddeutsches Vokalensemble and horn ensemble Marie Luise Neunecker, Romantische Chormusik – CD:Koch Schwann 3 1398-2 H1, 1994
- Timothy Seelig, Timothy Jenkins (tenor), Turtle Creek Chorale and Fort Worth Symphony Brass, Times of the Day – CD: Reference Recordings RR-67, 1995
- Jan Schumacher, Christoph Prégardien (Tenor), Camerata Musica Limburg, Serenade. Songs of night and love – CD: Genuin GEN 12224, 2011 - with male "yodelers"

== Sources ==
- Anton Bruckner – Sämtliche Werke, Band XXIII/2: Weltliche Chorwerke (1843–1893), Musikwissenschaftlicher Verlag der Internationalen Bruckner-Gesellschaft, Angela Pachovsky and Anton Reinthaler (Editor), Vienna, 1989
- Cornelis van Zwol, Anton Bruckner 1824–1896 – Leven en werken, uitg. Thoth, Bussum, Netherlands, 2012. ISBN 978-90-6868-590-9
- Uwe Harten, Anton Bruckner. Ein Handbuch. Residenz Verlag, Salzburg, 1996. ISBN 3-7017-1030-9.
