= Leopold von Zenetti =

Austrian composer (1805–1892)

- Leopold von Zenetti (Museum Lauricum Enns)
- Born: 15 November 1805; Enns, Austria
- Died: 12 October 1892 (aged 86)
- Occupations: Composer, Organist, Sacristan

Joseph Leopold von Zenetti (15 November 1805 – 12 October 1892) was an Austrian composer. He was the organist and choirmaster of the parish church in Enns in Upper Austria for 63 years.

== Life ==
Biographers of Anton Bruckner recently revived interest in one of his masters, the long-forgotten Leopold von Zenetti. Zenetti was born in the sexton’s house in Enns. His youth was marked by the French occupation and by the turbulent events in Upper Austria at the time. Zenetti had early access to music through his father who served as a bassist, the local organist and the Thurnermeistern whose instrumental skills were appreciated in the church and for musical representations. During his studies in Linz, he played in the orchestra of the Gesellschaft der Musikfreunde in Linz. He later became the organist and sacristan in Enns, where he lived at Kirchenplatz Nr. 5. Zenetti was actively involved in the liturgical and musical life of his home town.

Anton Bruckner was born near Enns and worked in Kronstorf and St Florian. Between 1843 and 1845, he was the pupil of Leopold von Zenetti in Enns. He visited his master up to three times a week to study figured bass using The Well-Tempered Clavier by Johann Sebastian Bach. Bruckner continued to work with Zenetti until 1855. Zenetti's music library was of considerable interest to Bruckner. Zenetti taught him the music of the First Viennese School as well as that of the emerging Romantic style.

Even after he became Professor of harmony and counterpoint at the University of Music in Vienna, Bruckner continued to seek advice from Zenetti. The student-teacher relationship had become a lasting friendship, and every time Bruckner was in Upper Austria "he came to Enns to visit, to speak cordially with his master during a few hours."

== Compositions ==
Late attention to Zenetti also explains the fate of his work. The number of compositions formally attributed to Zenetti is small: the Pastoralmesse in C for choir, soloists, orchestra and organ (1851), the Festmesse in B-flat for men's choir a cappella (written in 1883 for the inauguration of the pavilion of the Ennser Männergesangverein 'Concordia') and the Terzetto for violon, viola and cello (1882).

However, many unsigned manuscripts can be attributed to Zenetti: orchestral scores, vocal music, songs, masses, Vespers, Requiems and instrumental music. The bulk of his music library is lost or is scattered in various collections (including the Austrian National Library, the Museum of the city of Enns, the Museum of the Church of Enns, and the musical archives of the city of Linz). This corpus, which is often limited to isolated parts, gives a good view of the work of this composer, teacher, organist, and choirmaster of the second half of the 19th century.

== Bibliography ==
- Paul-Gilbert Langevin, Anton Bruckner - apogée de la symphonie, l'Age d'Homme, Lausanne, 1977 – ISBN 2-8251-0880-4
- Elisabeth Maier, Franz Zamazal, Anton Bruckner und Leopold von Zenetti, Akad. Druck- u. Verl.-Anst., Graz, 1980, - ISBN 3-2010-1146-0
