= Volkslied, WAB 94 =

1882 song composed by Anton Bruckner

Volkslied
- Secular choral work by Anton Bruckner
- Coat of Arms of the Empire of Austria
- Key: C major
- Catalogue: WAB 94
- Form: Patriotic song
- Text: Josef Winter
- Language: German
- Composed: 1882: Vienna
- Dedication: Competition for a hymn for the German People in Austria
- Published: 1932: Regensburg
- Vocal: First setting: Soloist and piano; Second setting: TTBB choir

The Volkslied ("National hymn"), WAB 94, is a patriotic song composed by Anton Bruckner in 1882 for a competition for a Hymne für das Deutsche Volk in Österreich (Hymn for the German People in Austria).

== History ==
On 16 October 1881, the Deutsche Zeitung invited submissions for a text für eines sangbares Nationallied (for a singable national hymn). From 1,750 texts entered, Josef Winter's was awarded the first prize. On 1 January 1882 a second invitation appeared for a Hymne für das Deutsche Volk in Österreich (Hymn for the German People in Austria), for men's choir as well as for voice and piano. Bruckner, as one of the 1,320 participants, sent a sample of both settings. No prize was awarded for any of the submissions.

The manuscripts are stored in the archive of the Österreichische Nationalbibliothek and the Bibliothèque nationale de Paris. The two settings were first published in Band III/2, pp. 191 and 192 of the Göllerich/Auer biography. The setting for voice and piano is issued in Band XXIII/1, No. 6 of the Gesamtausgabe. The setting for men's choir is issued in Band XXIII/2, No. 32 of the Gesamtausgabe.

== Lyrics ==
The song uses Josef Winter's lyrics:

Anheben lasst uns allzusamm'
Ein Lied von starkem Klange,
In Österreich den deutschen Stamm
Lasst preisen uns mit Sange.
Die auf die Ostmark einst gestellt,
Dem Feind den Weg zu weisen,
Sie stehen heute noch im Feld
Und halten blank ihr Eisen.

Let us raise together
A song of powerful sound,
Let us sing praise
To the German tribe in Austria.
Those, once positioned on the Eastern march
To show the enemies the way,
They still stand today in the field
And hold their weapon readily.

== Music ==
There are two settings of the Volkslied WAB 94:

- A 34-bar-long setting for voice and piano, which uses the first strophe of Winter's text.
- A 67-bar-long setting for men's TTBB choir, which uses the six strophes of Winter's text.

== Discography ==
=== Setting for voice and piano ===
There is no commercial recording of this setting. A live performance by Raymond Armstrong (1 April 2017) is available in the Bruckner Archive.

=== Setting for men's choir ===
There is a single recording of this setting:

- Thomas Kerbl, Männerchorvereinigung, Weltliche Männerchöre – CD: LIVA 054, 2012 – 1st strophe only

Note
The Volkslied has been performed at the Brucknerfest 2022 (Brucknerfest 2022 - Krieg und Frieden (29-09-2022)). A recording is available in the Bruckner Archive.

== Sources ==
- August Göllerich, Anton Bruckner. Ein Lebens- und Schaffens-Bild, c. 1922 – posthumous edited by Max Auer by G. Bosse, Regensburg, 1932
- Anton Bruckner – Sämtliche Werke, Band XXIII/1: Lieder für Gesang und Klavier (1851–1882), Musikwissenschaftlicher Verlag der Internationalen Bruckner-Gesellschaft, Angela Pachovsky (Editor), Vienna, 1997
- Anton Bruckner – Sämtliche Werke, Band XXIII/2: Weltliche Chorwerke (1843–1893), Musikwissenschaftlicher Verlag der Internationalen Bruckner-Gesellschaft, Angela Pachovsky and Anton Reinthaler (Editor), Vienna, 1989
- Cornelis van Zwol, Anton Bruckner 1824–1896 – Leven en werken, uitg. Thoth, Bussum, Netherlands, 2012. ISBN 978-90-6868-590-9
- Uwe Harten, Anton Bruckner. Ein Handbuch. Residenz Verlag, Salzburg, 1996. ISBN 3-7017-1030-9.
