= Arneth Cantata, WAB 61 =

Arneth Cantata Heil Vater! Dir zum hohen Feste
- by Anton Bruckner
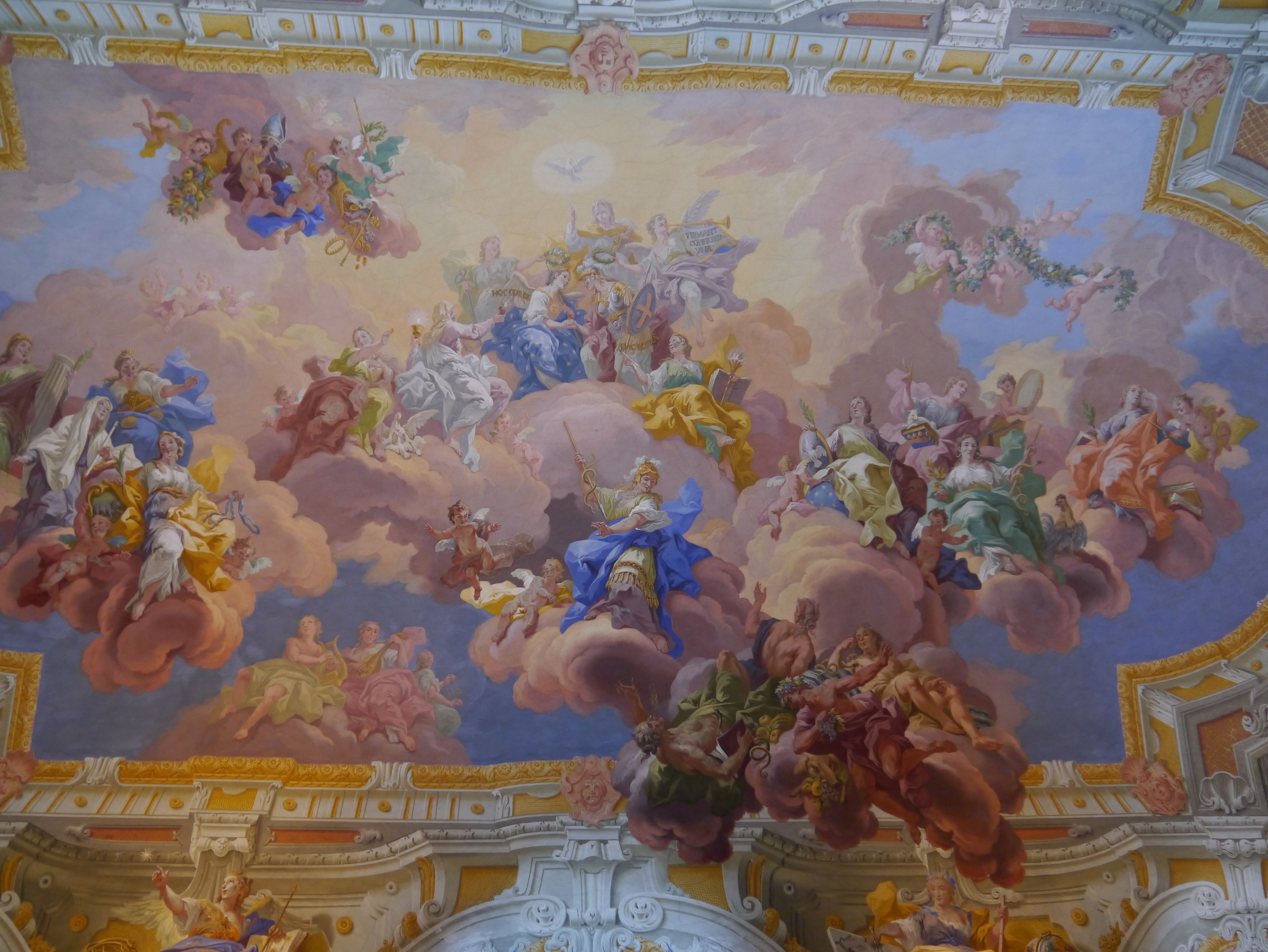
- Ceiling of the library of the St. Florian Abbey
- Key: D major
- Catalogue: WAB 61
- Form: Cantata
- Text: Ernst Marinelli
- Language: German
- Composed: 1852: St. Florian (1st version); 1857: St. Florian (2nd version)
- Dedication: Michael Arneth (1st version); Friedrich Mayer (2nd version)
- Vocal: SATTBB choir
- Instrumental: 3 horns, 2 trumpets, bass-trombone

The Arneth Cantata, WAB 61, is a cantata composed by Anton Bruckner in 1852.

== History ==
Bruckner composed the cantata for the name-day of Michael Arneth, the prior of the St. Florian Abbey. The piece was performed on 29 September 1852 on the evening before Arneth's name day.

The original manuscript is stored in the archive of the St. Florian Abbey. A facsimile of the cantata was first published in band II/1, pp. 116–128 of the Göllerich/Auer biography. It is put in Band XXII/1 No. 3a of the Gesamtausgabe.

There are two other versions of this celebratory composition:

- Auf Brüder! auf zur frohen Feier!, a shortened, 111-bar long version in five movements, on another text of Marinelli, composed in 1857. It was performed on 17 July 1857 as second name-day Cantata for Friedrich Mayer. The original manuscript of this second version is stored in the archive of the St. Florian Abbey. It is put in Band XXII/1 No. 3b of the Gesamtausgabe.
- Heil dir zum schöne Erstlingsfeste. In c. 1870, another text by Beda Piringer was put on the original seven-movement setting of the cantata for a Primitzfeier (celebration of the first Mass) by a newly ordained priest in Kremsmünster. The original score is lost, but copies of it are stored in the archive of the Kremsmünster Abbey. It is not known whether Bruckner was involved in the realisation process of the new setting. This setting is not put in the Gesamtausgabe.

== First version ==
=== Text ===
The first version of the cantata is using a text by Franz Ernst Marinelli.

Heil Vater! Dir zum hohen Feste.
Es weihen wir und werte Gäste
Des Dankes und der Liebe Preis
Dir durch die Gunst der Musen.
Dir schlägt so treu und wahr und heiß
Das Herz in jedem Busen.

An dreißig Jahre mögen's sein,
Da standest du als Vater ein
Für uns in Gott zu sorgen
Und alle, die sich dir vertraut,
Die freudig auf dein Wort gebaut,
Sie waren wohl geborgen.

Drum bringen wir mit Jubel heut',
Was jedes Herz an Liebe beut,
Was jeder Mund für dich erfleht
Und jeder Blick dir froh gesteht
Am Weihaltar des Dankes dar.

Des Herren Ruhm, des Hauses Kraft,
Die zierde Dein Priesterschaft,
Warst Du der Deinen Segen,
Und schrittest edel, fromm und mild
ein Hirte nach des Meisters Bild,
Voran auf unsern Wegen.

Du wirktest treu und bieder hier,
Drum sahst du in der Canonie
Manch edle Frucht erscheinen,
Du hast gelöst die schwere Pflicht
Und darum auch vergessen's nicht
Die Deinen!

Sie bringen dir mit Jubel heut'
Was jedes Herz an Liebe beut,
Was jeder Mund für dich erfleht
Und jeder Blick dir froh gesteht,
Sie rufen heut' im Brüderchor
Für dich den Dank des Herrn empor.

Hail father! To you on this noble celebration
We and worthy guests donate
The prize of gratitude and love
To you, favoured by the muses.
To you, faithfully, truly and fervently
The heart beats in every bosom.

It should be about thirty years,
Since you vouched as father
To care for us in God
And for all who trusted in you
And happily relied on your word;
They were well sheltered.

Therefore we offer today rejoycing
What every heart has in love,
What every mouth evokes for you,
And every look leaves you with joy,
On the blessed alter of thanks.

The praise of the Lord, the power of the house,
Your priesthood honoured them,
You were the blessing of your people,
You proceeded noble, devoted and gentle,
A shepherd on the frame of the Lord
Ahead of our ways.

You acted faithfully and honestly here,
Therefore you saw within the Canonics
Many a noble fruit appear,
You bore the heavy burden
And that is why your people will not
Forget you!

Today they bring to you with jubilation
What every heart has in love,
What every mouth evokes for you,
And every look leaves you with joy,
Today as a brotherly choir they evoke
For you the gratitude of the Lord.

=== Setting ===
The 123-bar long work, plus an 18-bar repeat, in D major is scored for SATTBB choir, and brass instruments (3 horns, 2 trumpets and bass-trombone). The trombone functions mostly as bass voice of a horn quartet.

The first version of the cantata (WAB 61a) is in seven movements:

1. Heil Vater! Dir zum hohen Feste: six-voice SATTBB mixed choir (24 bars) - Bewegt
2. An dreißig Jahre mögen's sein: TTBB men's choir a cappella (16 bars) - Mit Gefühl
3. Drum bringen wir mit Jubel heut: six-voice mixed choir (18 bars) - Bewegt
4. Des Herren Ruhm, des Hauses Kraft: men's choir a cappella (16 bars) - Mit Gefühl
5. Drum bringen wir mit Jubel heut: six-voice mixed choir (18 bars) - part 3 da capo
6. Du wirktest treu und bieder hier: men's choir a cappella (19 bars) - Andante
7. Final Choir Sie bringen dir mit Jubel heut': six-voice mixed choir (30 bars) - Nicht zu geschwind

This cantata, the first of three larger-scale occasional compositions, is mostly conventionally diatonic and based on simple structures. Movements two and three are repeated as movements four (with a different text) and five (exact repetition). The work displays already some marks of Bruckner's style. Two horn passages, which recur frequently, provide as in later works musical unity.

== Second version ==
=== Text ===
The second version of the catata is using a new text by Franz Ernst Marinelli.

Auf, Brüder! auf zur frohen Feier!
Mit Festeskränzen schmückt die Leier
Und innig wie's im Herzen schlägt
Erweckt die Kraft der Lieder.
Der Tag, der seinen Namen trägt,
Kehrt uns gesegnet wieder.

Wo ist das Herz, das Ihn nicht kennt?
Wo ist der Dank, der Ihn nicht nennt?
In Liebe und Vertrauen.
Saht Ihr wohl je auf Vaters Wort
Auf solchen Freundes milden Hort
Getäuschte Hoffnung bauen?

Nein! nein, die Hoffnung täuschet nicht.
Der Edle liebt der Liebe Pflicht.
Und wo der Vater streng gebaut,
Ist auch der Freund zugleich bereit.
Und knüpft das Band
Mit treuer Hand.

Drum schlägt das Herz in freier Brust
Und folgt des Dankes hehre Lust
Auf seinen Lebenswegen.
Und droht die Zeit auch noch so schwer
Es lächelt ihm von oben her
Von oben her der Segen.

O Herr im Himmel siehe hier
Der Deinen Schaar, sie ruft zu Dir.
Und Preis und Dank ist ihr Gebet
Und Segen, den sie heiß erfleht,
Geliebt, geachtet und verehrt
Ist er auch Deines Schutzes wert.

Let's go, brothers for a happy celebration!
Decorate the lyre with a festive wreath
And fondly as it beats in the heart
Arouses the power of the songs.
The day, which carries his name,
Returns to us, blessed.

Where is the heart, which does not know him?
Where is the thanks, which does not mention him?
In love and trust.
Did you ever see on the father's word,
On such a friend's gentle refuge
building deceived hopes?

No! no, hope does not deceive.
The noble man loves the duty of love.
And where the father is trusted,
The friend is also immediately ready
And ties the band
With faithful hand.

Therefore the heart beats in a happy chest
Followed by the noble delight of thanks
On his paths of life.
And even if time threatens so heavily
there smiles at him from above
From above the blessing.

O Lord in Heaven, see here
The group of yours, it calls to You.
And praise and thanks is their prayer
And blessing that they implore intensely,
Beloved, respected and venerated
he is also worthy of Your custody.

=== Setting ===
The second version of the cantata (WAB 61b) is in five movements:

1. Auf, Brüder auf zur frohen Feier!: six-voice SATTBB mixed choir (25 bars) - Bewegt
2. Wo ist das Herz, das Ihn nicht kennt: TTBB men's choir a cappella (19 bars) - Mit Gefühl
3. Nein, nein die Hoffnung täuschet nicht: six-voice mixed choir (18 bars) - Bewegt
4. Drum schlägt das Herz in froher Brust: men's choir a cappella (19 bars) - Andante
5. Final Choir O Herr im Himmel siehe hier: six-voice mixed choir (30 bars) - Nicht zu geschwind

The repeat of movements two and three was eliminated. The opening section of the first choir was expanded from thirteen bars to fourteen, and last half of movement two was recomposed. The shortened, second version is 111-bar long, plus an 11-bar repeat.

== Sources ==
- August Göllerich, Anton Bruckner. Ein Lebens- und Schaffens-Bild, c. 1922 – posthumous edited by Max Auer by G. Bosse, Regensburg, 1932
- Anton Bruckner – Sämtliche Werke, Band XXII/1: Kantaten und Chorwerke I (1845–1855), Musikwissenschaftlicher Verlag der Internationalen Bruckner-Gesellschaft, Franz Burkhart, Rudolf H. Führer and Leopold Nowak (Editor), Vienna, 1987 (Available on IMSLP: Neue Gesamtausgabe, XXII/1. Kantaten und Chorwerke Teil 1: Nr. 1-5)
- Uwe Harten, Anton Bruckner. Ein Handbuch. Residenz Verlag, Salzburg, 1996. ISBN 3-7017-1030-9
- Keith William Kinder, The Wind and Wind-Chorus Music of Anton Bruckner, Greenwood Press, Westport, Connecticut, 2000
- Cornelis van Zwol, Anton Bruckner 1824–1896 – Leven en werken, uitg. Thoth, Bussum, Netherlands, 2012. ISBN 978-90-6868-590-9
- Crawford Howie, Anton Bruckner - A documentary biography, online revised edition
