= Two Totenlieder (Bruckner) =

1852 elegies composed by Anton Bruckner

- Motets by Anton Bruckner
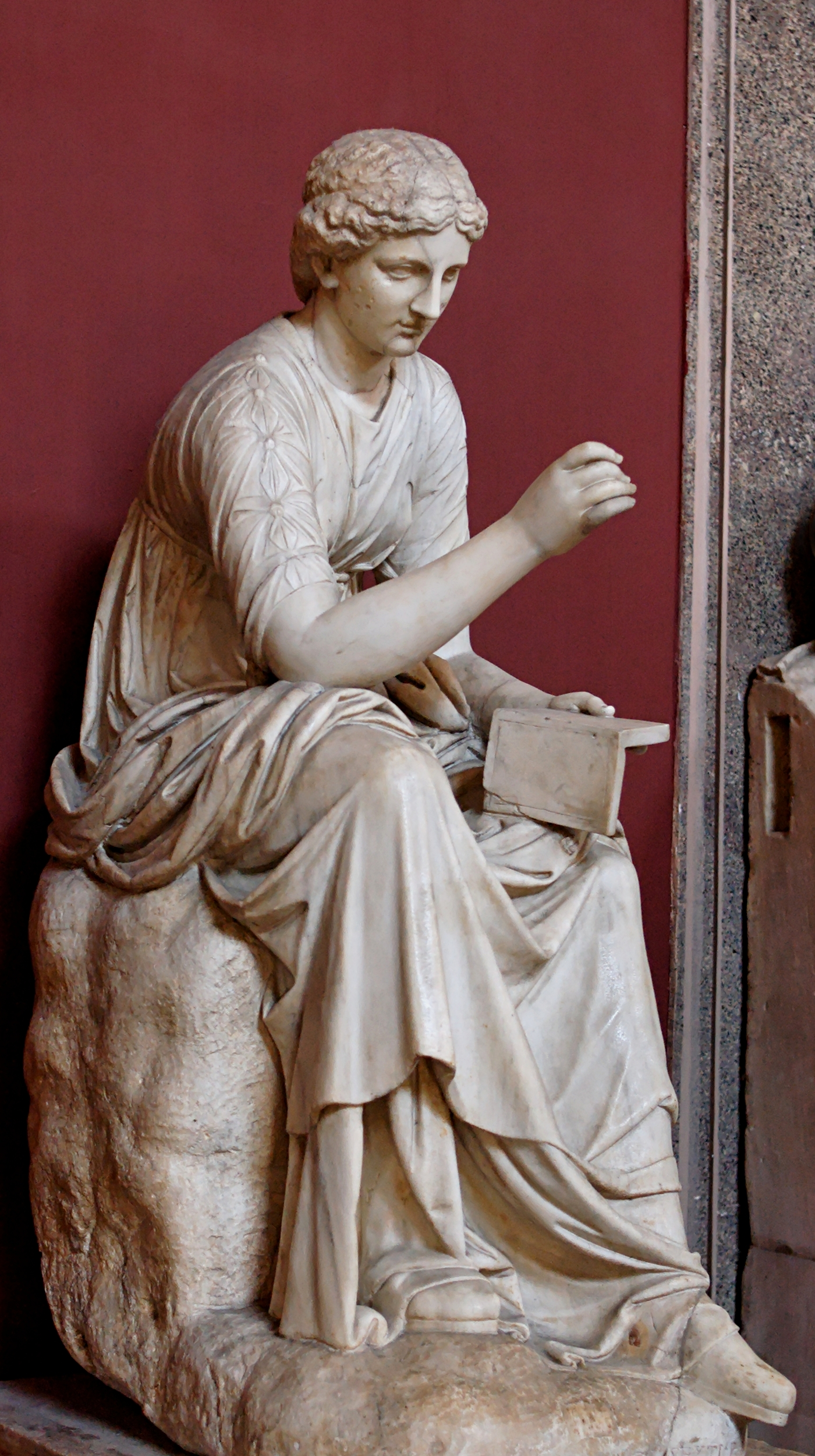
- Calliope, muse of elegy
- Key: E♭ major, F major
- Catalogue: WAB 47/1 & 47/2
- Form: Elegy
- Language: German
- Composed: 1852: St. Florian Abbey
- Dedication: Funeral of Josef Seiberl
- Published: 1932: Regensburg
- Vocal: SATB choir

The two Totenlieder, WAB 47/1 & 47/2, are elegies composed by Anton Bruckner in 1852.

== History ==
Bruckner composed these two motets in 1852 for the funeral of his friend Josef Seiberl. The original manuscript is in the Stadtmuseum of Wels and a transcription is in the Österreichische Nationalbibliothek.

The two Totenlieder were first published in band II/2, pp. 141–144 of the Göllerich/Auer biography. They are put in Band XXI/16 of the Gesamtausgabe.

== Text ==
O ihr, die ihr heut mit mir zum Grabe geht
und bei meinem Leichnam jetzt versammelt steht,
heftet Sinn und Herzen nicht an diese Eitelkeit!
Sucht nur Gottes Reich und die Gerechtigkeit.

You, who go today with me to the tomb
And are now convened by my corps,
Do not stick your soul and heart to this vanity!
Look only for Gods kingdom and for justice.

== Music ==
The works are scored for SATB choir a cappella. The first setting in E♭ major is 10-bar long. The second setting in F major is 19-bar long.

== Discography ==
There are a few recordings of the Totenlieder:

- Jürgen Jürgens, Monteverdi-Chor, Bruckner - Music of St Florian Period (II) - CD: BSVD-0111 (Bruckner Archive), 1985 - only the first Totenlied
- Duncan Ferguson, Choir of St. Mary's Cathedral of Edinburgh, Bruckner: Motets – CD: Delphian Records DCD34071, 2010
- Thomas Kerbl, Chorvereinigung Bruckner 2011, Anton Bruckner Lieder/Magnificat – CD: LIVA 046, 2011
- Philipp von Steinäcker, Vocalensemble Musica Saeculorum, Bruckner: Pange lingua - Motetten - CD: Fra Bernardo FB 1501271, 2015
- Łukasz Borowicz, Anton Bruckner: Requiem, RIAS Kammerchor Berlin, Akademie für Alte Musik Berlin – CD: Accentus ACC30474, 2019

== Sources ==
- August Göllerich, Anton Bruckner. Ein Lebens- und Schaffens-Bild, c. 1922 – posthumous edited by Max Auer by G. Bosse, Regensburg, 1932
- Anton Bruckner – Sämtliche Werke, Band XXI: Kleine Kirchenmusikwerke, Musikwissenschaftlicher Verlag der Internationalen Bruckner-Gesellschaft, Hans Bauernfeind and Leopold Nowak (Editor), Vienna, 1984/2001
- Cornelis van Zwol, Anton Bruckner 1824–1896 – Leven en werken, uitg. Thoth, Bussum, Netherlands, 2012. ISBN 978-90-6868-590-9
