= Das hohe Lied, WAB 74 =

Das hohe Lied
- Secular choral work by Anton Bruckner
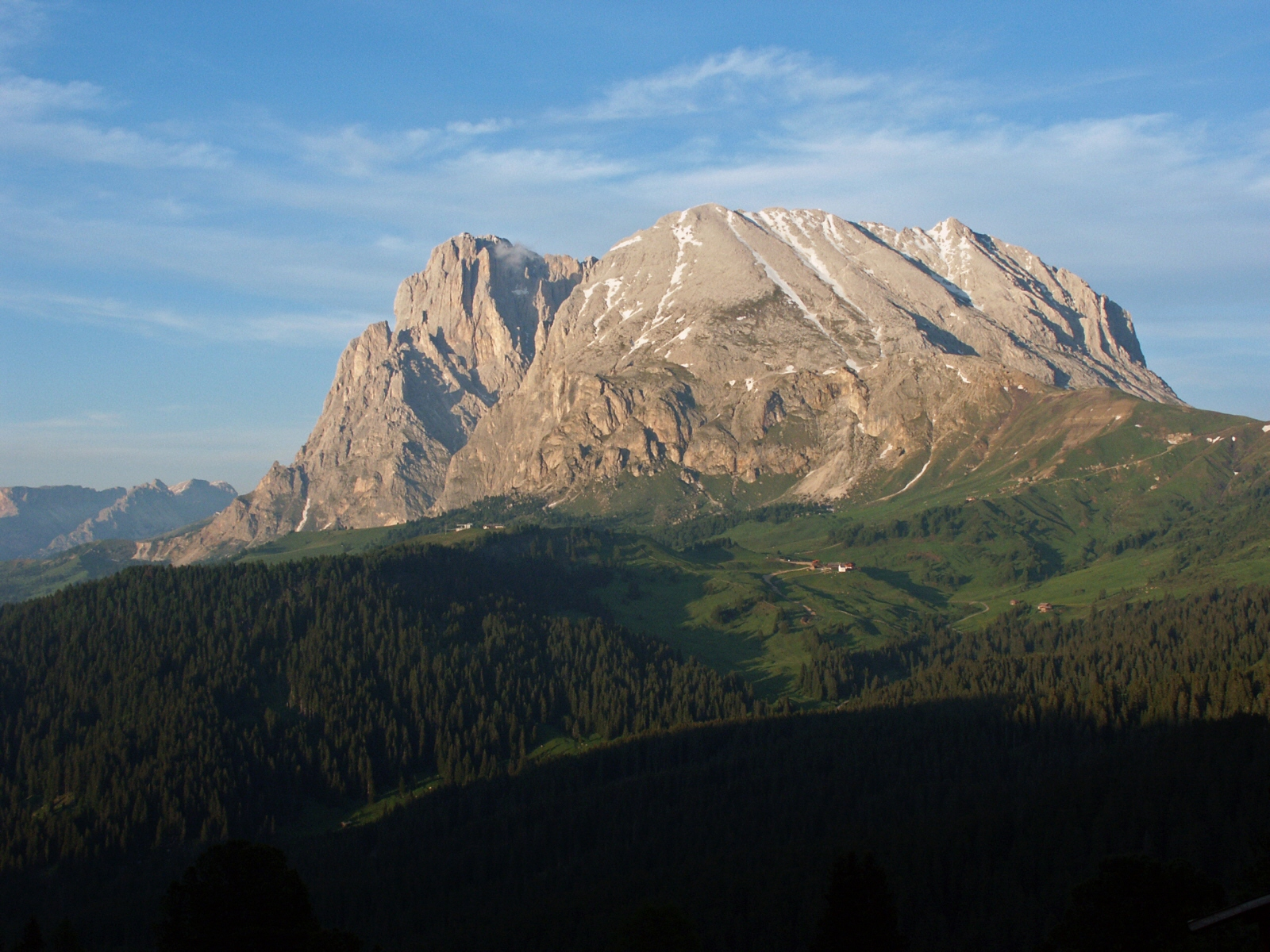
- The Plattkofel in the evening
- Key: A-flat major
- Catalogue: WAB 74
- Text: Heinrich von der Mattig
- Language: German
- Composed: 31 December 1876: Vienna
- Dedication: Wiener Akademisches Gesangverein
- Published: 1902: Vienna
- Vocal: TTBB double choir, 2 tenor and baritone soloists
- Instrumental: First setting: a cappella; Second setting: String and brass instruments

Das hohe Lied (The song of the heights), WAB 74, is a song for double men's choir and three soloists, which Anton Bruckner composed in 1876 on a text by Heinrich von der Mattig.

== History ==
Bruckner composed Das hohe Lied on a text of Heinrich von der Mattig on 31 December 1876 as homage to the Wiener Akademisches Gesangverein (Academic singing association of Vienna). Das Hohelied is a German name of the Song of Songs, which is possibly an intentional allusion.

During the rehearsals, the choir found the work difficult to perform because of the use of humming voices. Therefore, conductor Richard Heuberger asked Bruckner to revise the work. When revising the work in 1879, Bruckner added an accompaniment of strings and brass instruments. On 10 December 1879 a new rehearsal occurred under Bruckner's baton, but was not followed by a public performance. The first public performance occurred posthumously in 1902 in a transcription by Hans Wagner.

The original manuscript is stored in the archive of the Universitätssängerschaft 'Barden zu Wien'. Wagner's transcription was issued by Doblinger, Vienna in 1902. The original setting of 1876 is issued in Band XXIII/2, No. 27 of the Gesamtausgabe. The revised setting of 1879 is put in an Appendix to Band XXIII/2 of the Gesamtausgabe.

== Text ==
Das hohe Lied is based on a text by Heinrich von der Mattig.

Im Tale rauscht die Mühle und stört des Wandrers Lied,
Bis er durch Waldesdunkel hinauf die Berge flieht.
Und immer ferner rauschet die Mühle tief im Tal.
Und immer kräft'ger schallet des Liedes Widerhall.
Die Höhe ist erklommen, jetzt ist das Lied allein
Und schwimmt auf luft'gen Wellen ins Abendrot hinein.

In the valley, the rustling mill disturbs the walker's song,
Until he escapes through forest darkness up to the mountains.
And in the valley, the mill is rustling ever more distantly.
And ever more strongly resonates the song.
The heights are reached, the song is now alone
And floats on aerial waves into the evening's red.

== Music ==
The 84-bar long work in A-flat major is scored for TTBB double choir, and 2 tenor and a baritone soloists. Similarly to Abendzauber, the first part (44 bars) is sung by the soloists with an accompaniment of humming voices, figuring the rustling mill. From "Die Höhe ist erklommen", the melody is taken over by the double choir.

Because of the performance difficulties (humming voices) encountered during the rehearsals, Bruckner added in 1879 an accompaniment of strings (2 violas, 2 cellos and double bass) to enhance the humming voices, and of brass instruments (4 horns, 3 trombones and a tuba) to accompany the double choir.

== Sources ==
- Anton Bruckner – Sämtliche Werke, Band XXIII/2: Weltliche Chorwerke (1843–1893), Musikwissenschaftlicher Verlag der Internationalen Bruckner-Gesellschaft, Angela Pachovsky and Anton Reinthaler (Editor), Vienna, 1989
- Cornelis van Zwol, Anton Bruckner 1824–1896 – Leven en werken, uitg. Thoth, Bussum, Netherlands, 2012. ISBN 978-90-6868-590-9
- Uwe Harten, Anton Bruckner. Ein Handbuch. Residenz Verlag, Salzburg, 1996. ISBN 3-7017-1030-9.
