= Libera me, WAB 22 =

1854 motet composed by Anton Bruckner

Libera me
- Motet by Anton Bruckner
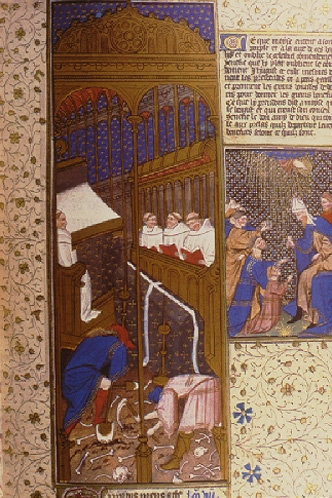
- L'Office des morts, Maître de Rohan
- Key: F minor
- Catalogue: WAB 22
- Form: Absoute
- Text: Libera me
- Language: Latin
- Composed: 28 March 1854: Sankt Florian
- Published: 1922: Vienna
- Vocal: SSATB choir
- Instrumental: 3 trombones, organ, cello, double bass

Libera me ("Deliver me"), WAB 22, is the second of two settings of the absoute Libera me, composed by Anton Bruckner in 1854.

== History ==
Bruckner composed the motet during his stay in Sankt Florian for the absoute of the funeral of prelate Michael Arneth.

The original manuscript is lost, but several copies of it are found in the archive of the St. Florian Abbey, the Kremsmünster Abbey and the Österreichische Nationalbibliothek. The motet was first published in an appendix of band 7-10 of Musica divina, Vienna, 1922. It is put in Band XXI/17 of the Gesamtausgabe.

== Music ==
The in total 94-bar work in F minor is scored for SSATB choir, 3 trombones and figured bass (organ, cello and double bass). It is in five parts, separated by cadences on the responses Quando cœli and Dum veneris

1. Libera me, Domine: homophonic, 18 bars, ending pianissimo on per ignem with a bare fifth
2. Tremens fac: five-voice fugato, 23 bars, ending in homophonic fortissimo on Quando cœli
3. Dies illa: 25 bars, in canon, with a variety of imitative textures, ending in homophonic fortissimo on Dum veneris
4. Requiem aeternam: 10 bars, a chorale sustained by the trombones
5. First part da capo

Part 3 contains dissonances similar to those found in the Agnus Dei of the later Mass in E minor. Apart from its significance as a precursor to Bruckner's mature style, the F minor Libera me is effective on its own terms. The music is heartfelt and profound, and is a gracious, if rather austere, rendering of the text.

== Selected discography ==
The first recording of the Libera me occurred in 1979:

- Hans Zanotelli, Hans Zanotelli, Philharmonia vocal-ensemble Stuttgart, Anton Bruckner: Latin motets – CD: Calig CAL 50477

A selection among the about 20 recordings:

- Anton Bruckner – Music of the St. Florian Period (II), Jürgen Jürgens conducting the Monteverdi-Chor and the Camerata Academica Hamburg, Werner Kaufmann (Organ), 1985; this historical, previously not issued performance has recently been transferred to CD: BSVD-0111, 2012
- Matthew Best, Corydon Singers, English Chamber Orchestra Wind Ensemble, Mass in E minor; Libera me; Zwei Aequale – CD: Hyperion CDA66177, 1985
- Petr Fiala, Czech Philharmonic Choir, Anton Bruckner: Motets – CD: MDG 322 1422-2, 2006
- Erwin Ortner, Arnold Schoenberg Chor, Anton Bruckner: Tantum ergo – CD: ASC Edition 3, issue of the choir, 2008
- Thomas Kerbl, Chorvereinigung Bruckner 09, Ensemble Linz, Anton Bruckner: Chöre/Klaviermusik – CD: LIVA 034, 2009
- Łukasz Borowicz, Anton Bruckner: Requiem, RIAS Kammerchor Berlin, Akademie für Alte Musik Berlin – CD: Accentus ACC30474, 2019

== Sources ==
- Max Auer, Anton Bruckner als Kirchenmusiker, G. Bosse, Regensburg, 1927
- Keith William Kinder, The Wind and Wind-Chorus Music of Anton Bruckner, Greenwood Press, Westport, Connecticut, 2000
- Anton Bruckner – Sämtliche Werke, Band XXI: Kleine Kirchenmusikwerke, Musikwissenschaftlicher Verlag der Internationalen Bruckner-Gesellschaft, Hans Bauernfeind and Leopold Nowak (Editor), Vienna, 1984/2001
- Cornelis van Zwol, Anton Bruckner 1824–1896 – Leven en werken, uitg. Thoth, Bussum, Netherlands, 2012. ISBN 978-90-6868-590-9
