= Iam lucis orto sidere, WAB 18 =

Iam lucis orto sidere
- Motet by Anton Bruckner
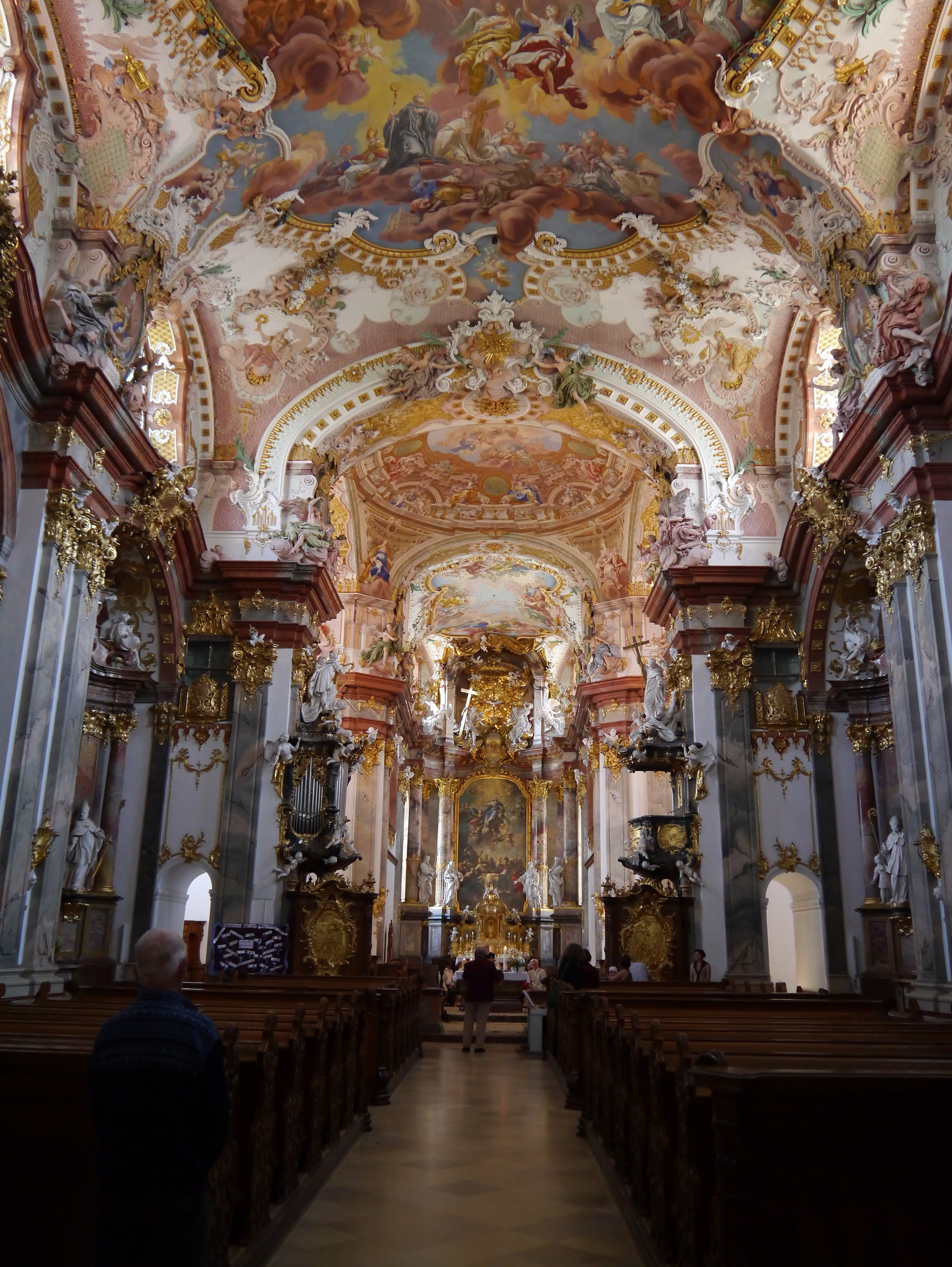
- Nave of Wilhering Abbey Church
- Key: Phrygian mode (1st & 2nd setting); G minor (3rd setting)
- Catalogue: WAB 18
- Language: Latin
- Composed: 1868: Linz (1st & 2nd settings); 1886: Vienna (3rd setting)
- Dedication: Alois Dorfer
- Published: 1868: Wilhering Abbey
- Vocal: SATB choir (1st & 2nd settings); TTBB choir (3rd setting)
- Instrumental: Organ (2nd setting); a cappella (1st & 3rd settings)

Iam lucis orto sidere (Now that the daylight fills the sky), WAB 18, is a motet composed by Anton Bruckner in 1868. The work is also known as In S. Angelum custodem (In the custody of the holy angel). Bruckner revised the composition in 1886.

== History ==
Bruckner composed this motet in the summer of 1868 for the Schutzengelbruderschaft ("Guardian angel confraternity") of Wilhering Abbey. Bruckner dedicated it to Adolf Dorfer, the abbot of the abbey. Bruckner set the music on the text written by Robert Riepl, one of the priests working at the abbey. The motet was performed in the same year in the abbey.

Riepl's text is an adaptation of the text used by Orlande de Lassus. Bruckner's original manuscript, which was stored in the abbey, is lost. A copy of it is stored in the archive of the Kremsmünster Abbey and two other copies are found in the Austrian National Library. The motet was published in 1868 by the Wilhering Abbey.

In 1886, Bruckner made a new version of the motet for men's choir, which was published in the journal An den schönen blauen Donau, volume 1, no. 8, p. 240, F. Mamroth, Vienna.

The Gesamtausgabe includes two settings of the 1868 version in volume XXI/24, and the 1886 setting in volume XXI/35.

== Music ==
The first version in Phrygian mode, which Bruckner composed in 1868, is 24-bar long. Two settings are extant: a first with all eight verses of Riepl's text for SATB choir a cappella, and a second with only one verse of a different text for SATB choir and organ. The motet is a simple, modally inspired piece and homophonic throughout.

A new version of the motet in G minor, which Bruckner composed in 1886, uses verses 1, 2, 7 and 8 of Riepl's text and is set for TTBB choir a cappella.

=== Text of the first setting (Robert Riepl) ===
Iam lucis orto sidere
Dignare, custos Angele!
Mentis fugare nubila
Et alma ferre lumina;
Me recta prudens edoce,
Ur exsequar, me commone.

Fidus venis qui coelitus
Illuc redisque nuntius!
Preces, labores, lacrimas
Ad Regis aulam perferas;
Donum clientis parvulum
Reddas Datori munerum.

Miserrimum dulcissimo
Blandus fove solacio;
Salutis ad negotia
Me dormitantem concita.
Quando reluctor, argue;
Vires labanti suffice.

Puro refulgens lumine,
Quod emicat de Numine!
Me sanctitatis aemulum
A labe serves integrum.
Ne castitatis candida
Contaminentur lilia.

Firma repelle dextera
Vim daemonis sub tartara;
Carnis retunde fomitem,
Superbiae propaginem,
Tuis ut armis protegar
Palmamque victor consequar.

Cordis rigentis ferream
Perfringe pertinaciam;
Culpae gravatum sacrina
Manu potenti subleva
Poenasque sonti debitas
Fac suplicans ut arceas.

Fuga ruant quum turbida
Mortalis aevi tempora:
Caduca fac me temnere,
Aeterna semper quaerere,
Ut heareat mens fervida
Sublimis inter sidera.

Urgente pugna lugubri
Fortis paventi subveni;
Per mortis umbram dirige
Defende coram Judice
Laetaque de sententia
Fruar perenni gloria. Amen.

Now that daylight fills the sky,
Let it, O Guardian Angel,
Banish unclear minds
And bring the nourishing light!
Teach me prudently the correct order
And admonish me to reach it!

Reliably you come from Heaven
And return as a messenger to it.
Bring the offers, pains and tears
To the King's court;
Provide the Giver of talents
With a small gift from the servant!

Foster me, the unfortunate, embracing
With the sweetest consolation!
Prompt me, the dormant,
To the works of salvation!
Blame me, when I hesitate,
Give me the strength, when I fall!

Radiant of the pure light,
Which floods out from God,
I am in search of holiness.
Deliver me from stain,
So that the white lilies of chastity
Be not sullied.

By your powerful right repel
The powers of the Devil to Hell;
Destroy the pleasure of the flesh,
Which arises from pride,
So that, protected by your arms,
I may be victorious.

Break the inflexible obstinacy
Of the merciless heart;
I am oppressed by the burden of sin,
Relieve it by your powerful hand
And spare me the punishment of the guilty
By your prayers.

In storms let hurry the times
The temporal life will assault!
Let me disdain the ephemeral
And always seek the eternal,
So that my noble soul
Would remain in Heaven.

When mortal struggle is imminent,
Assist me, quavering, firmly!
Guide me through the shades of death,
Advocate me in front of the Judge
And on grounds of the acquittal
Might I enjoy the eternal splendour! Amen.

=== Text of the second setting ===
Iam lucis orto sidere
O Angele piissime!
Caecas mentis caligines
Splendore tuo dissipes;
Quae recta sunt, me edoce,
Ut faciam, me admone.

Now that the daylight fills the sky,
My holy angel,
By your brightness
Draw the darkness from my soul;
Teach me the right way
And advise me to follow it.

Note: In addition to the Latin text, there is also a German version based on a text by Margarete Hemleben entitled Du Herr der Herren, in a presumably Protestant-oriented hymnal.

Du Herr der Herren, Jesus Christ,
Lass leuchten uns dein Angesicht,
Daß Deiner Liebe heller Schein
Verwandle unser irdisch Sein,
Zu tragen durch der Erde Nacht
Dein Licht, Dein Leben, Deine Macht.

O Lord of Lords, Jesus Christ,
Let us shine your face,
That your love's shine brightly
Transform our earthly being,
To carry through the earth's night
Your light, your life, your power.

A performance can be heard on YouTube: Choir Nomen Nescio Arnhem – Du Herr der Herren

== Selected discography ==
The first recording occurred in 1976:

- Mathias Breitschaft, Limburger Domsingknaben, Bruckner: 9 Motets/Palestrina: 8 Motets – LP: Carus FSM 53118 (1st verse of the 1st setting)

=== 1868 version ===
==== First setting ====
A few other recordings, all with deviations from the score:

- Balduin Sulzer, Chor des Musikgymnasiums Linz, Musik aus der Stifterstraße – LP: Extempore AD-80.01/2, 1980 (verses 1, 2 & 3)
- Robert Jones, Choir of St. Bride's Church, Bruckner: Motets – CD: Naxos 8.550956, 1994 (all 8 verses)
- Lionel Sow, Choeur de Filles Caecilia & Maîtrise des Petits Chanteurs de Saint-Christophe de Javel, Johannes Brahms – Anton Bruckner Jardins secrets – CD: Studio SM Collection Blanche D3029, 2004 (verses 1, 2 & 3)

==== Second setting ====
Only one recording :

- Balduin Sulzer, Mozart Chor Linz, Bruckner – CD: AtemMusik Records ATMU 97001, 1997 (with brass accompaniment)

=== 1886 version ===
There are two recordings of this version:

- Duncan Ferguson, Choir of St. Mary's Cathedral of Edinburgh, Bruckner: Motets – CD: Delphian Records DCD34071, 2010
- Matthias Giesen, Schola Floriana, Kirchenmusik im Bruckner-Ort Ansfelden – CD: Weinberg Records SW 010497-2, 2016 (strophes 1 & 2)

== Sources ==
- Anton Bruckner – Sämtliche Werke, Band XXI: Kleine Kirchenmusikwerke, Musikwissenschaftlicher Verlag der Internationalen Bruckner-Gesellschaft, Hans Bauernfeind and Leopold Nowak (Editor), Vienna, 1984/2001
- Cornelis van Zwol, Anton Bruckner 1824–1896 – Leven en werken, uitg. Thoth, Bussum, Netherlands, 2012. ISBN 978-90-6868-590-9
- Crawford Howie, Anton Bruckner – A documentary biography, online revised edition
