= Oskar von Redwitz =

German poet

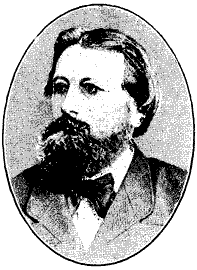
Oskar von Redwitz

Oskar Freiherr von Redwitz (28 June 1823 – 6 July 1891) was a German poet from Lichtenau, Bavaria. Having studied at the Ludwig-Maximilians-Universität München and the University of Erlangen, he was apprenticed to the law in the Bavarian State service (1846–49).

He next (1849–50) studied languages and literature at the University of Bonn, and in 1851 was appointed professor of aesthetics and of the history of literature at the University of Vienna. In 1852, however, he gave up this post and retired to his estate of Schellenberg, near Kaiserslautern.

The pious sentimentality of his romantic epic Amaranth (1849; 42nd ed., 1898) had already gained him enthusiastic admirers, and this work was followed, in 1850, by Märchen and by Gedichte (1852) and the tragedy Sieglinde (1854). He next settled on his estates near Kronach, and here wrote the tragedy Thomas Morus (1856), the historical dramas Philippine Welser (1859) and Der Zunftmeister von Nürnberg (1860), of which the first two met with great success.

Elected member of the Bavarian Second Chamber for the district in which he lived, he moved back to Munich in 1862. In 1868, he published the novel Hermann Stark, deutsches Leben, and in 1871 Das Lied vom neuen deutschen Reich ("Song of the New German Reich", which contains several hundred patriotic sonnets). In 1872, he took up his residence at Meran, but passed the last years of his life at a sanatorium for nervous disorders near Bayreuth, where he died on 6 July 1891.
