= Asperges me =

Latin antiphon; Gregorian hymn

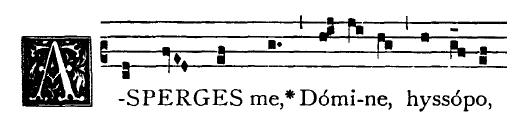
Incipit of the standard Gregorian chant setting of the Asperges, from the Liber Usualis

Asperges me is a Latin antiphon said or sung at a High Mass in the Catholic and Evangelical-Lutheran traditions during all liturgical seasons except the Easter (Paschal) season and Palm Sunday. It traditionally accompanies the Asperges, the ritual sprinkling of the congregation by the celebrating priest with holy water, as part of an entrance ritual, symbolising the cleansing of the people. Its words are taken from Psalm 51:

Text	Translation
Asperges me, Domine, hyssopo et mundabor, Lavabis me, et super nivem dealbabor. Miserere mei, Deus, secundum magnam misericordiam tuam.	'Thou shalt sprinkle me with hyssop, and I shall be cleansed: Thou shalt wash me, and I shall be made whiter than snow. Have mercy on me, O God, according to thy great mercy.'

It is followed by the conventional doxology (except on the first Sunday of Passiontide):

Text	Translation
Gloria Patri et Filio et Spiritui Sancto; Sicut erat in principio, et nunc, et semper, et in saecula saeculorum. Amen.	'Glory be to the Father, and to the Son, and to the Holy Spirit. As it was in the beginning, is now, and ever shall be, world without end. Amen.'

It is not uncommon for the priest to pause sprinkling at the Gloria Patri, then bow towards the Tabernacle out of reverence for the Holy Trinity. He then resumes as the antiphon is recited a second time.

From Easter until Pentecost, Asperges me is replaced by the more lengthy and florid antiphon, Vidi aquam.

Although usually sung to plainchant, Asperges Me has been set to music; two well-known examples are those by Gilles Binchois (Bologna, International museum and library of music, Ms Q15) and Tomás Luis de Victoria.
