= Libera me =

Roman Catholic responsory in Masses for the dead

"Libera me" ("Deliver me") is a responsory sung in the Office of the Dead in the Catholic Church, and at the absolution of the dead, a service of prayers for the dead said beside the coffin immediately after the Requiem Mass and before burial. The text asks God to have mercy upon the deceased person at the Last Judgment.

In addition to the Gregorian chant in the Roman Gradual, many composers have written settings for the text, including Tomás Luis de Victoria, Anton Bruckner (two settings), Giuseppe Verdi, Gabriel Fauré, Maurice Duruflé, Igor Stravinsky, Benjamin Britten, Sigismund von Neukomm, Orlande de Lassus, Krzysztof Penderecki, Antonio Salieri, Lorenzo Perosi, Arnold Rosner and Patrick Gowers (first stanza only).

Libera me, Domine, de morte æterna, in die illa tremenda
Quando cœli movendi sunt et terra
Dum veneris iudicare sæculum per ignem.

Tremens factus sum ego, et timeo, dum discussio venerit, atque ventura ira
Quando cœli movendi sunt et terra.

Dies illa, dies iræ, calamitatis et miseriæ, dies magna et amara valde
Dum veneris iudicare sæculum per ignem.

Requiem æternam dona eis, Domine: et lux perpetua luceat eis.

Deliver me, O Lord, from death eternal on that fearful day,
When the heavens and the earth shall be moved,
When thou shalt come to judge the world by fire.

I am made to tremble, and I fear, till the judgment be upon us, and the coming wrath,
When the heavens and the earth shall be moved.

That day, day of wrath, calamity and misery, day of great and exceeding bitterness,
When thou shalt come to judge the world by fire.

Rest eternal grant unto them, O Lord: and let light perpetual shine upon them.

The responsory is begun by a cantor, who sings the first part of the versicles, and the responses are sung by the choir. The text is written in the first-person singular, "Deliver me, O Lord, from eternal death on that fearful day", a dramatic substitution in which the choir speaks for the dead person.

In the traditional Office, Libera me is also said on All Souls' Day (2 November) and whenever all three nocturns of Matins of the Dead are recited. On other occasions, the ninth responsory of Matins for the Dead begins with Libera me, but continues with a different text (Domine, de viis inferni ...).
