= Kronstorf =

- Municipality
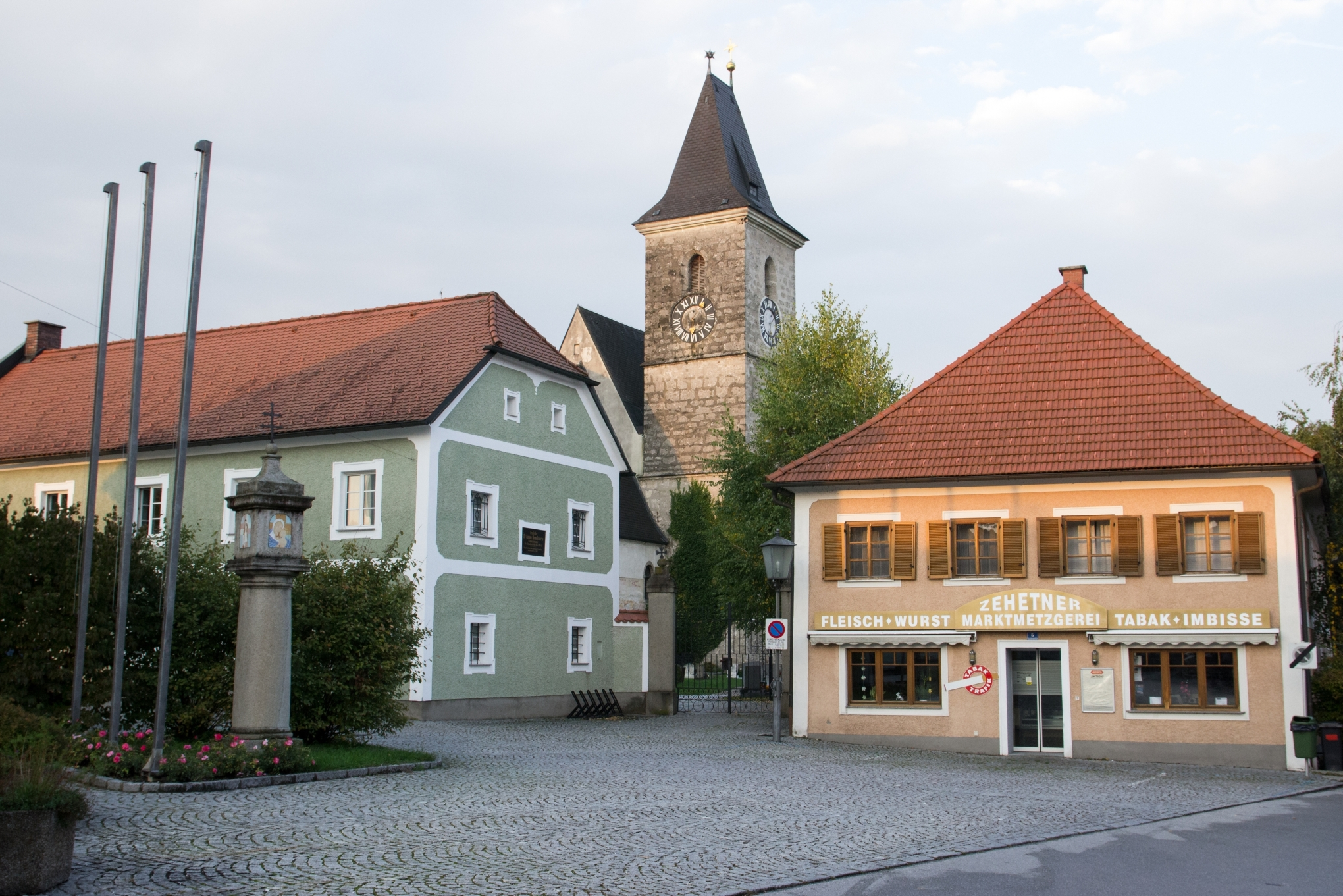

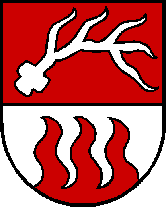
- Coat of arms

- Location within Austria
- Coordinates: 48°8′34″N 14°28′0″E
- Country: Austria
- State: Upper Austria
- District: Linz-Land

Government
  - Mayor: Christian Kolarik (ÖVP)

Area
  - Total: 21.34 km^{2} (8.24 sq mi)
- Elevation: 277 m (909 ft)

Population (2018-01-01)
  - Total: 3,389
  - Density: 158.8/km^{2} (411.3/sq mi)
- Time zone: UTC+1 (CET)
  - Summer (DST): UTC+2 (CEST)
- Postal code: 4484
- Area code: 07225
- Vehicle registration: LL
- Website: www.kronstorf.at

Kronstorf is a municipality in the district Linz-Land in the Austrian state of Upper Austria. In April 2026, the groundbreaking ceremony for the first Austrian google data center took place, which is supposed to provide around 100 jobs in the future with electricity and cooling coming from the river Enns.

== Economy ==
Kronstorf is the seat of a hydroelectric power plant named Mühlrading at the river Enns.

At the end of 2008, it was announced that the Google Group intended to build its first Austrian google data center in Kronstorf, and a 70-hectare plot of land between Kronstorf, Dietach and Hargelsberg was purchased. As google didnt start the project for 10 years, the two municipalities in form of the Kronstorf-Hargelsberg company repurchased 20 hectares. In April 2026, the groundbreaking ceremony for a data center which is supposed to provide around 100 jobs took place. The center is geared at Google cloud services, YouTube-streaming and to provide the infrastructure for AI-services. Mühlrading and photovoltaic panels are to provide electric power and the Enns will be used for cooling. As in other google data centers (in Hamina Finland), Google intends to offer waste heat for local district heating.

== Population ==
Historical population
Year	Pop.	±%
1869	1,073	—
1880	1,183	+10.3%
1890	1,174	−0.8%
1900	1,246	+6.1%
1910	1,236	−0.8%
1923	1,200	−2.9%
1934	1,162	−3.2%
1939	1,179	+1.5%
1951	1,619	+37.3%
1961	1,872	+15.6%
1971	2,209	+18.0%
1981	2,278	+3.1%
1991	2,418	+6.1%
2001	3,002	+24.2%
2011	3,140	+4.6%
