= List of secular choral works by Anton Bruckner =

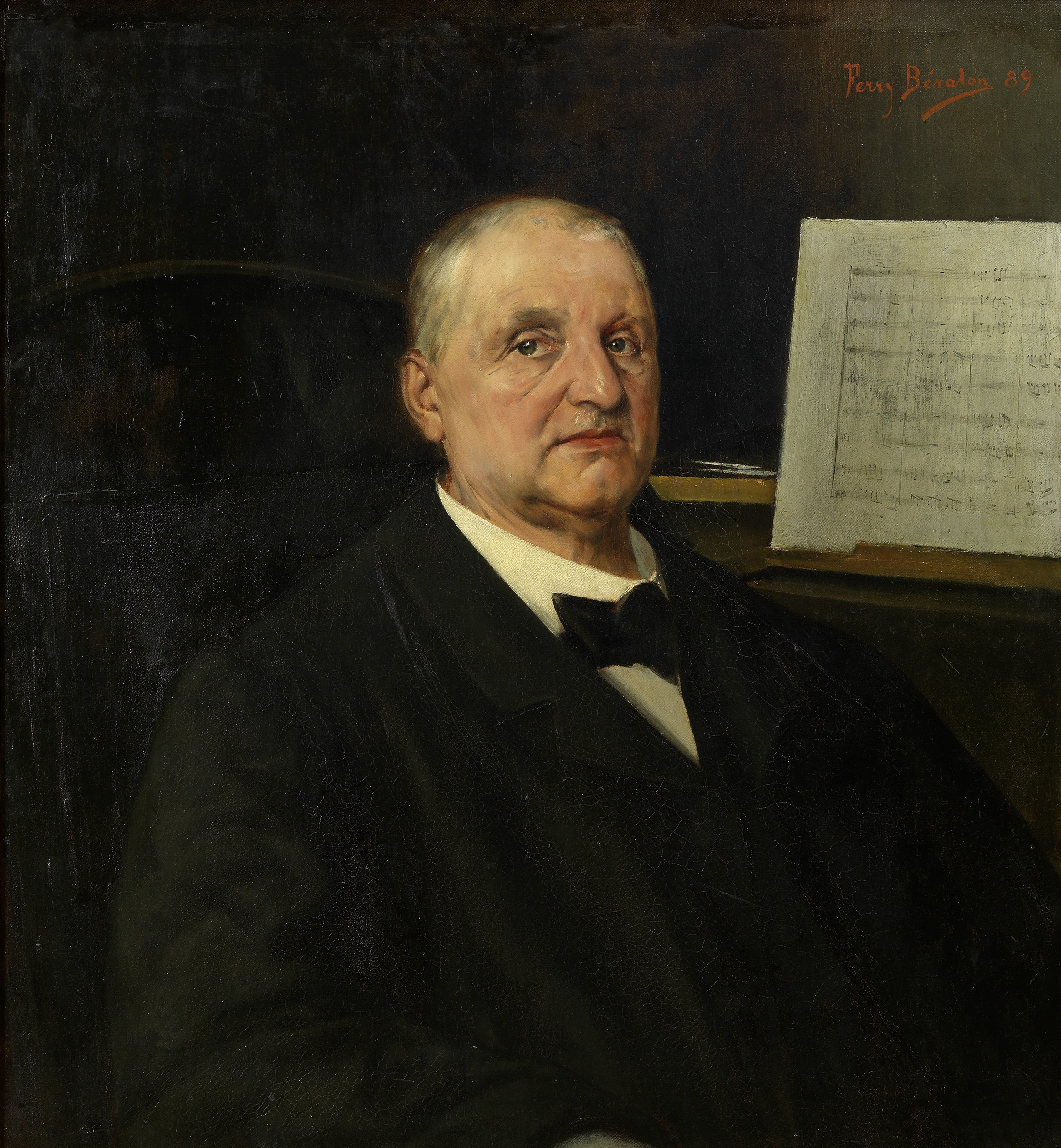
Portrait of Anton Bruckner (1889)

Throughout almost all his composing life, Anton Bruckner composed about thirty Weltliche Chorwerke (secular choral works) and seven Wahlsprüche (mottoes) on German-language texts, the first in 1843 and the last in 1893. Many of these works including the mottoes, often with a patriotic slant, were written for Liedertafel (men's choral societies), above all Frohsinn and Sängerbund. Others were composed for private occasions, such as weddings, funerals, birthdays or name-days, being dedicated to friends and acquaintances of the composer. The large majority of these works are set for men's choir, sometimes with soloists. Only two choral works (WAB 64 and WAB 66) and one motto (WAB 95.1) are set for mixed choir.

== Kronstorf ==
- An dem Feste, WAB 59a, a 20-bar long work, with 5 strophes, in D♭ major for men's choir composed on 19 September 1843 on a text by Alois Knauer. Around his life-end (1893), Bruckner reissued this first Weltliches Chorwerk as Tafellied, WAB 59c.

== Sankt Florian ==
- Das Lied vom deutschen Vaterland, WAB 78, a 20-bar long work in D♭ major for men's choir composed in c. 1845. The composer of the text is unknown.
- Ständchen, WAB 84.2, a 29-bar long work in G major, for humming men's-voice quartet and tenor soloist, composed in c. 1846 on a text possibly by Ernst Marinelli. Bruckner used this text already in c. 1845 for his sketched lied Wie des Bächleins Silberquelle, WAB 84.1.
- Der Lehrerstand, WAB 77, an 84-bar long work in E♭ major for men's choir and voice quartet, composed in c. 1847 on a text possibly by Ernst Marinelli.
- Sternschnuppen, WAB 85, a 38-bar long work in F major for men's voice quartet composed in c. 1848 on a text by Ernst Marinelli.
- Two mottoes: Ein jubelnd Hoch in D major, WAB 83.1, and Lebt wohl, ihr Sangesbrüder in A major, WAB 83.2., for men's choir composed for the Liedertafel Eferding in 1851.
- Das edle Herz, WAB 65 (1st setting), a 46-bar long work in A major for men's choir composed in c. 1851 on a text by Ernst Marinelli.
- Die Geburt, WAB 69, a 25-bar long work in D♭ major for men's choir, composed in the beginning of 1852 for the name day of Bruckner's friend Josef Seiberl.
- Vor Arneths Grab, WAB 53, a 28-bar long work in F minor for men's choir and 3 trombones on a text by Ernst Marinelli, composed in 1854 as elegy for prelate Michael Arneth.
- Laßt Jubeltöne laut erklingen, WAB 76, a 100-bar long "semi-cantata" in E♭ major for men's choir on a text by Hillischer, composed in 1854 as festive song for the Joyous Entry of imperial bride Elisabeth in Linz.
- Des Dankes Wort sei mir vergönnt, WAB 62, an 89-bar long work F major scored for 5-part humming men's choir and tenor and bass soloist composed around 1845-1849 (or 1854?) on a text by Ernst Marinelli.

== Linz ==
- Das edle Herz, WAB 66, a 38-bar long 2nd setting in A major for mixed choir composed in December 1857.
- Am Grabe, a 21-bar long reissue in 1861 of the first 3 strophes a cappella of Vor Arneths Grab as elegy for Josefine Hafferl.
- Du bist wie eine Blume, WAB 64, a 32-bar long work in F major for mixed-voice quartet composed on 5 December 1861 on a text by Heinrich Heine
- Der Abendhimmel (1st setting), WAB 55, a 38-bar long work in A♭ major for men's-voice quartet composed in January 1862 on a text by Joseph Christian Freiherr von Zeidlitz.
- Herbstlied, WAB 73, a 69-bar work in F♯ minor, for men's choir, 2 soprano soloists and piano, composed on 19 March 1864 on a text by Friedrich von Sallet.
- Um Mitternacht (1st setting), WAB 89, a 59-bar long work in F minor for men's choir, alto soloist and piano composed on 12 April 1864 on a text by Robert Prutz.
- Trauungschor, a WAB 49, a 55-bar long work in F major for men's choir, men's-voice quartet and organ, composed in 1865 on a text by Franz Isidor Proschko for the wedding celebration of Karl Kerschbaum with Maria Schimatschek.
- Der Abendhimmel (2nd setting), WAB 56, a 38-bar long work in F major for men's choir, composed on 6 December 1866.
- Vaterlandslied, WAB 92, an 87-bar long work in A♭ major for men's choir, and tenor and baritone soloists, composed in November 1866 on a text by August Silberstein.
- Vaterländisch Weinlied, WAB 91, a 12-bar long work (6 strophes) in C major for men's choir, November 1866 on a text by August Silberstein.
- Motto: Des Höchsten Preis, WAB 95.2, in C major for men's choir, composed in c. 1868 for the Liedertafel Sierning on a text by Andreas Mittermayr.
- Motto: Das Frauenherz, die Mannesbrust, WAB 95.1, in A major for mixed choir, composed in c. 1868 for the Liedertafel Frohsinn on a text by Karl Kerschbaum.

== Vienna ==
- Two mottoes: Im Wort und Liede wahr und frei, WAB 148.1, in C major, and Wir Alle, Jung und Alt, WAB 148.2, in D minor, composed in 1869 on texts by Johann Kajetan Markus as posthumous respects for Simon Sechter.
- Mitternacht, WAB 80, an 84-bar long work in A♭ major for men's choir, tenor soloist and piano, composed in 1869 on a text by Joseph Mendelssohn.
- Motto: Freier Sinn und hoher Mut, WAB 147, in D major for men's choir, composed on 21 March 1874 for the Gesangverein Liederkrans.
- Das hohe Lied, WAB 74, an 84-bar long work in A♭ major for humming men's choir, and 2 tenor and baritone soloists, composed on 31 December 1876 on a text by Heinrich von der Mattig. In 1879 Bruckner made a 2nd setting of it with strings (2 violas, cello and double bass) and brass instruments (4 horns, 3 trombones and tuba).
- Nachruf, WAB 81a, a 51-bar long work in C minor for men's choir and organ, composed on 19 October 1877 on a text by Heinrich von der Mattig, in memory of Josef Seiberl.
  In 1886, the work was reissued as Trösterin Musik, WAB 81b, with another text by August Seuffert.
- Abendzauber, WAB 57, an 82-bar long work in G♭ major, for men's choir, mezzo-soprano or tenor/baritone solo, 3 yodelers and 4 horns, composed on 15 January 1878 on a text by Heinrich von der Mattig.
- Zur Vermählungsfeier, WAB 54, a 68-bar long work in D major for men's choir, composed on 27 November 1878 for the wedding celebration of Anton Ölzelt Ritter von Newin with Amalie Edler von Wieser.
- Sängerbund, WAB 82, a 79-bar long work in C major for men's choir, composed on 3 February 1882. Two settings: on a text by Heinrich von der Mattig (?), and a text by Karl Kerschbaum.
- Volkslied, WAB 94, a 67-bar long work in C major for men's choir, composed in 1882 on a text by Josef Winter. Bruckner composed it, as well as another setting for voice and piano (Sämtliche Werke, Band XXIII/1, No. 6), for a competition Für ein sangbares Nationallied (for a singable National hymn).
- Um Mitternacht (2nd setting), WAB 90, a 93-bar long work in F minor for humming men's choit and tenor soloist, composed on 11 February 1886.
- Heut komt ja Freund Klose zum Gause, WAB 203, a 4-bar long, 4-voice canon in C major, composed on 29 April 1889. Not issued in the Gesamtausgabe.
- Träumen und Wachen, WAB 87, a 75-bar long work in A♭ major for humming men's choir and tenor soloist, composed on 15 December 1890 on a text by Franz Grillparzer.
- Der deutsche Gesang, WAB 63, an 87-bar long work in D minor for men's choir and brass instruments (4 horns, 3 trumpets, 3 trombones and double-bass tuba), composed on 29 April 1892 on a text by Erich Fels.
- Tafellied, WAB 59c, a 16-bar long reissue with 3 strophes, of An dem Feste, WAB 59a, in D♭ major composed on 22 February 1893 on a text by Karl Ptak.

== Discography ==
The discography of Bruckner's Weltliche Chorwerke is much smaller than that of his religious works. Most Weltliche Chorwerke were much later issued and are, as a result of it, still quite unknown. Except Trösterin Musik, WAB 88, which is quite popular and has been recorded about 30 times, the Weltliche Chorwerke are rarely performed. One third of these works (8 Weltliche Chorwerke and 4 mottoes) have not yet been commercially recorded.

Four recordings are dedicated to Bruckner's Weltliche Chorwerke:

- Guido Mancusi, Chorus Viennensis, Musik, du himmlisches Gebilde! – CD: ORF CD 73, 1995 (8 Weltliche Chorwerke)
- Thomas Kerbl, Männerchorvereinigung Bruckner 08, Anton Bruckner Männerchöre – CD: LIVA 027, 2008 (9 Weltliche Chorwerke)
- Jan Schumacher, Camerata Musica Limburg, Serenade. Songs of night and love – CD: Genuin GEN 12224, 2011 (4 Weltliche Chorwerke)
- Thomas Kerbl, Männerchorvereinigung Bruckner 12, Weltliche Männerchöre – CD: LIVA 054, 2012 (12 Weltliche Chorwerke and 3 mottoes)

A compilation of 5 lieder and 30 Weltliche Chorwerke (Bruckner – Lieder and Secular Choral Music) in the chronological order of the Gesamtausgabe Band XXIII/1: Lieder für Gesang und Klavier, and Band XXIII/2: Weltliche Chorwerke, is available in the Bruckner Archive: Charter Oak COR-2178 (set of 2 CDs).

During the Brucknerfest Linz 2024, the Chorus Viennensis and Sonat Vox performed on 5 October 2024 an a cappella repertoire for Men’s Choir including ten Bruckner's Weltliche Chorwerke.

== Sources ==
- Renate Grasberger, Werkverzeichnis Anton Bruckner (WAB), Publikationen des Instituts für österreichische Musikdokumentation, Hans Schneider, Tutzing, 1977 - ISBN 3-7952-0232-9
- Anton Bruckner – Sämtliche Werke, Band XXIII/2: Weltliche Chorwerke (1843–1893), Musikwissenschaftlicher Verlag der Internationalen Bruckner-Gesellschaft, Angela Pachovsky and Anton Reinthaler (Editor), Vienna, 2001
- Uwe Harten, Anton Bruckner. Ein Handbuch. Residenz Verlag, Salzburg, 1996. ISBN 3-7017-1030-9.
- Cornelis van Zwol, Anton Bruckner 1824–1896 – Leven en werken, uitg. Thoth, Bussum, Netherlands, 2012. ISBN 978-90-6868-590-9
- Crawford Howie, Anton Bruckner - A documentary biography, online revised edition
