= Träumen und Wachen, WAB 87 =

1890 song composed by Anton Bruckner

Träumen und Wachen
- Secular choral work by Anton Bruckner
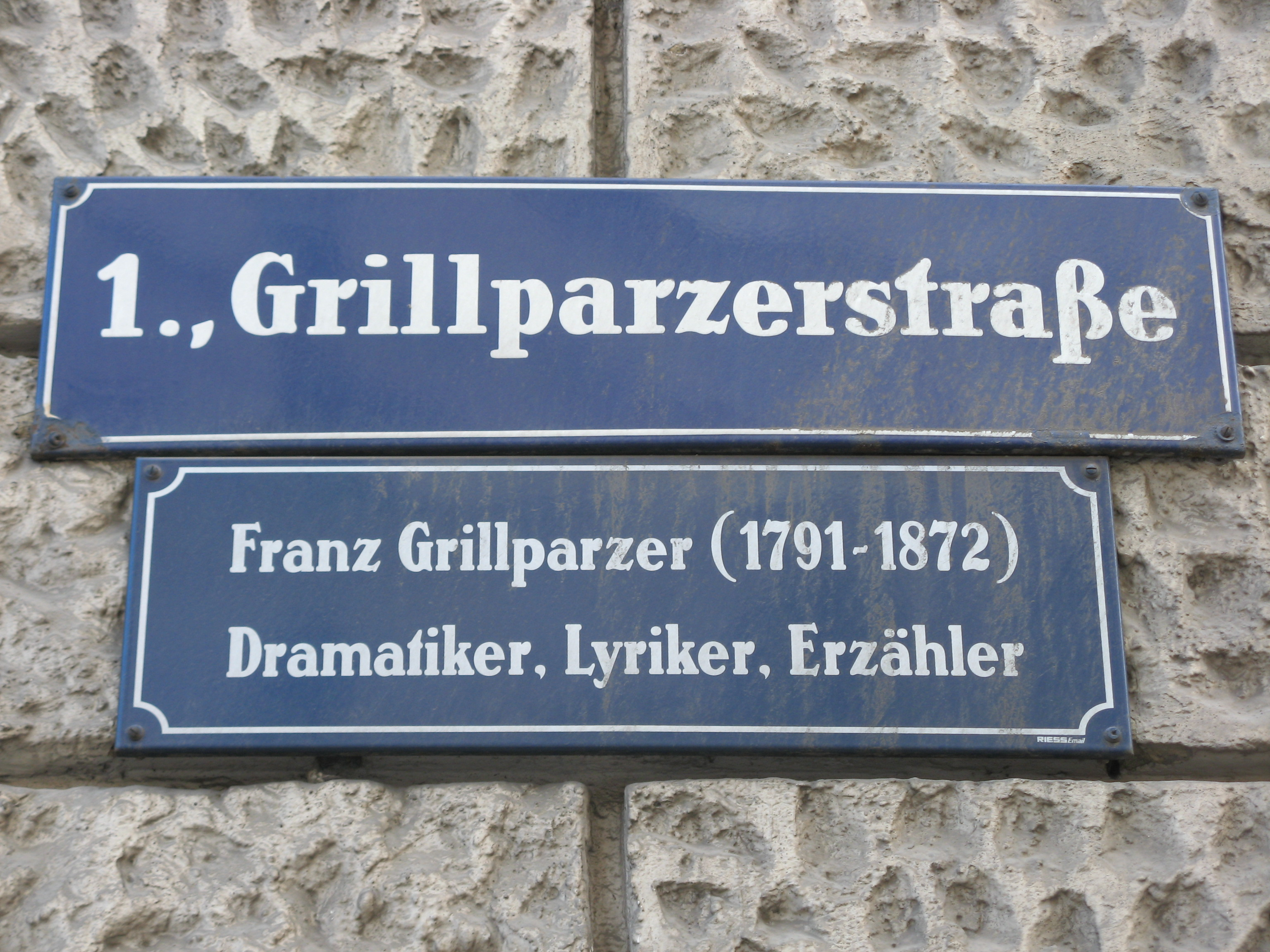
- Street plaque of the Grillparzerstraße, Vienna
- Key: A♭ major
- Catalogue: WAB 87
- Text: Franz Grillparzer
- Language: German
- Composed: 15 December 1890: Vienna
- Dedication: Wilhelm Ritter von Hartel
- Published: 1891: Vienna
- Vocal: TTBB choir and tenor soloist

Träumen und Wachen (Dreaming and being awake), WAB 87, is a song, which Anton Bruckner composed in 1890 to celebrate the 100th anniversary of Franz Grillparzer's birth.

== History ==
Bruckner composed the song on 15 December 1890. The text is from the end of Act I of Franz Grillparzer's drama Der Traum ein Leben.

The piece was performed under Bruckner's baton at the Grillparzer-Feier, to celebrate the 100th anniversary of Grillpatzer's birth (15 January 1891) by the Wiener Akademisches Gesangverein (Academic singers association of Vienna) with Franz Schaumann (tenor) in the ballroom of the university of Vienna. Bruckner dedicated the composition to his housemate Wilhelm Ritter von Hartel, the rector of the university of Vienna.

The piece, of which the original manuscript is stored in the archive of the performing choir (current name: Universitätssängerschaft 'Barden zu Wien'), was published in 1891 by Theodor Rättig, Vienna without Bruckner's assignment.

Because of the encountered performance difficulties (humming voices), Bruckner revised the composition slightly on 4 February 1892. The song is issued in Band XXIII/2, No. 34 of the Gesamtausgabe.

== Text ==
The work uses a text from the end of Act I of Franz Grillparzer's drama Der Traum ein Leben (A dream is life):

Schatten sind des Lebens Güter,
Schatten seiner Freuden Schar,
Schatten Worte, Wünsche, Taten;
Die Gedanken nur sind wahr.

Und die Liebe, die du fühlest,
Und das Gute, das du tust,
Und kein Wachen als im Schlafe,
Wenn du einst im Grabe ruhst.

Shadows are the goods of life,
Shadows its joys,
Shadows words, wishes, acts;
Thoughts alone are true.

And the love that you feel,
And the good that you do,
And awakening only in the sleep
When you once rest in the grave.

== Music ==
The 75-bar long work in A-B-A' form is scored in A♭ major for TTBB choir and tenor soloist. The first 24 bars are sung by the choir. On bar 25 ("Und die Liebe, die du fühlest"), the text is taken over in D♭ major by the tenor soloist with accompaniment of humming voices. From bar 44 ("wenn du einst im Grabe ruhst."), the song is taken over by the choir. From bar 52, the choir repeats the first strophe.

== Discography ==
There are two recordings of Träumen und Wachen:

- Guido Mancusi, Chorus Viennensis, Herbert Lippert (tenor), Musik, du himmlisches Gebilde! – CD: ORF CD 73, 1995
- Thomas Kerbl, Männerchorvereinigung, Michael Nowak (tenor) Weltliche Männerchöre – CD: LIVA054, 2012

== Sources ==
- Anton Bruckner – Sämtliche Werke, Band XXIII/2: Weltliche Chorwerke (1843–1893), Musikwissenschaftlicher Verlag der Internationalen Bruckner-Gesellschaft, Angela Pachovsky and Anton Reinthaler (Editor), Vienna, 1989
- Cornelis van Zwol, Anton Bruckner 1824–1896 – Leven en werken, uitg. Thoth, Bussum, Netherlands, 2012. ISBN 978-90-6868-590-9
- Uwe Harten, Anton Bruckner. Ein Handbuch. Residenz Verlag, Salzburg, 1996. ISBN 3-7017-1030-9.
