= Sternschnuppen, WAB 85 =

Sternschnuppen
- Secular choral work by Anton Bruckner
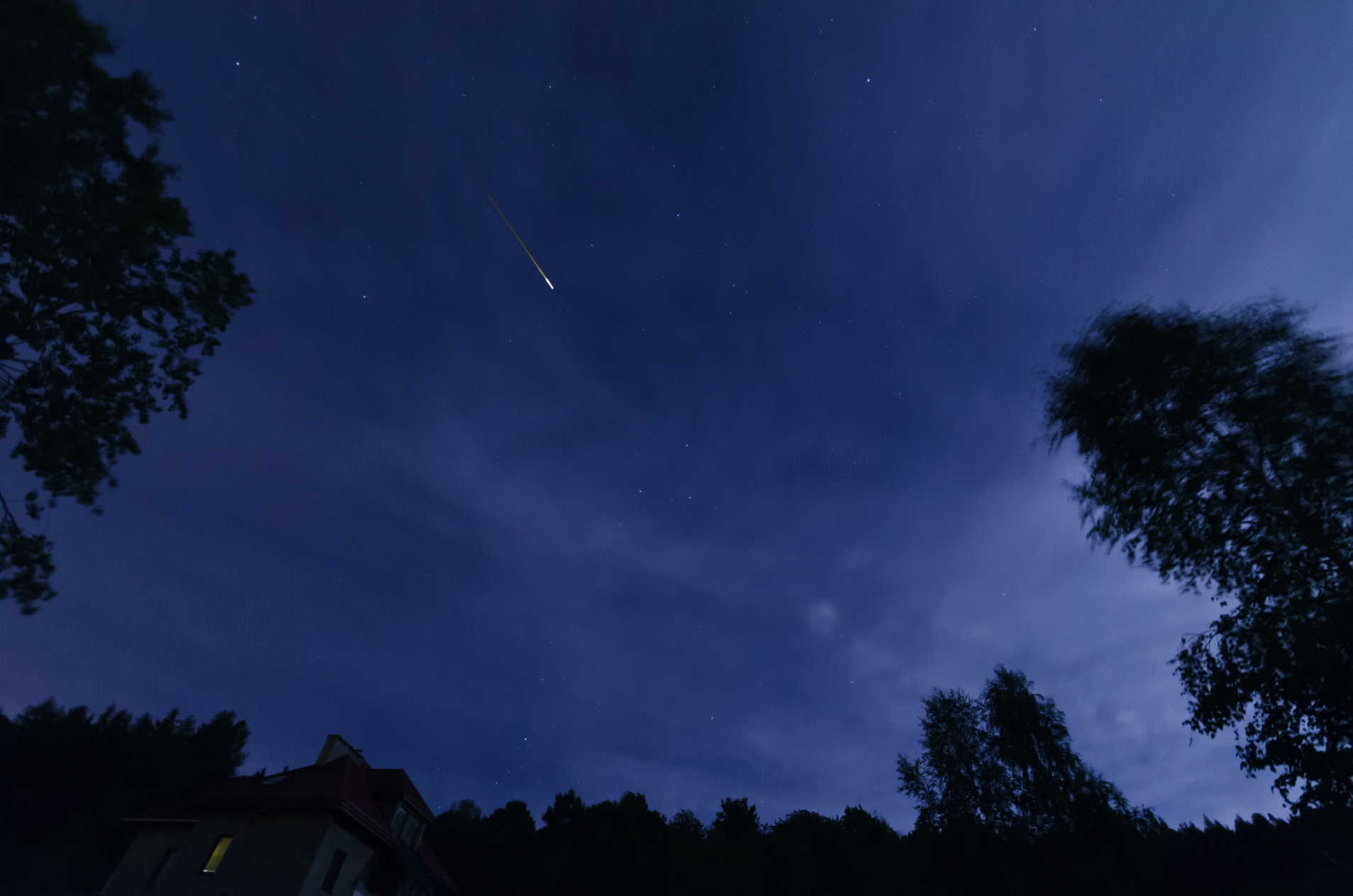
- Shooting star
- Key: F major
- Catalogue: WAB 85
- Text: Ernst Marinelli
- Language: German
- Composed: c. 1848: Sankt Florian
- Dedication: Bruckner's own men's quartet
- Published: 1932: Regensburg
- Vocal: TTBB quartet

Sternschnuppen (Shooting stars), WAB 73, is a song, which Anton Bruckner composed for his own men's voice quartet in c. 1848 during his stay in the Sankt Florian.

== History ==
Bruckner composed the song on a text of Ernst Marinelli in c. 1848. He dedicated it to his own men's voice quartet, which was composed of Ludwig Ehrenecker, Franz Schäfler, Johann Nepomuk Hueber and himself. It is not known when the piece was first performed.

The original manuscript is stored in the archive of the St. Florian Abbey. The piece was first published in band II/2, pp. 94-96 of the Göllerich/Auer biography. It was thereafter issued in 1954, together with Ständchen, in the Chorblattreihe of Robitschek, Vienna. The piece is issued in Band XXIII/2, No. 5 of the Gesamtausgabe.

== Text ==
Sternschnuppen is using a text by Ernst Marinelli.

Wenn Natur die sanften Lider
Still zum Abendschlummer neigt
Und dem schattenreichen Flieder
Philomelens Sang entsteigt,

Wenn mit goldnem Schmuck die Leier
In dem Schwesterreigen kehrt
Und die Welt in stiller Feier
Lunas milder Blick verklärt,

Schwingt sich auf wie leises Fragen
Sehnsuchtsvoll der feuchte Blick,
Ob kein Bild von schönen Tagen
Himmel strahlt ins Herz zurück?

Und die Sterneschnuppen mahnen,
Wie das eitel Träumen war;
Denn der Seele dunkles Ahnen
Wird nur drüben offenbar.

When nature tilts her gentle lids
Quietely for evening's sleep,
And from the shadowy lilac
Philomela's song rises,

When Lyra with golden ornament
Enters into a sisters' round dance
And the world in silent feast
Is illuminated by Luna's gentle glance,

Like a silent question
A moist glance swings up longingly,
If no image of beautiful days
The sky will reflect into the heart?

And the shooting stars remind
How it was dream in vain,
Because the soul's dark foreseeing
Is revealed only over there.

== Music ==
The 38-bar long work in F major is scored for TTBB quartet. In the Göllerich/Auer biography the song is described as follows: Über dem Ganzen liegt die weichliche Romantik der damals beliebten Männerchor-Musik (On the whole piece rests the softish romanticism of the at that time popular men's choir-music).

== Discography ==
A selection among the few recordings of Sternschnuppen:

- Guido Mancusi, Chorus Viennensis, Musik, du himmlisches Gebilde! – CD: ORF CD 73, 1995
- Hubert Voigt, Thüringer Männerchor Ars Musica, Weltliches und Geistliches – CD issued by the choir, 2012 live

== Sources ==
- August Göllerich, Anton Bruckner. Ein Lebens- und Schaffens-Bild, c. 1922 – posthumous edited by Max Auer by G. Bosse, Regensburg, 1932
- Anton Bruckner – Sämtliche Werke, Band XXIII/2: Weltliche Chorwerke (1843–1893), Musikwissenschaftlicher Verlag der Internationalen Bruckner-Gesellschaft, Angela Pachovsky and Anton Reinthaler (Editor), Vienna, 1989
- Cornelis van Zwol, Anton Bruckner 1824–1896 – Leven en werken, uitg. Thoth, Bussum, Netherlands, 2012. ISBN 978-90-6868-590-9
- Uwe Harten, Anton Bruckner. Ein Handbuch. Residenz Verlag, Salzburg, 1996. ISBN 3-7017-1030-9.
- Crawford Howie, Anton Bruckner - A documentary biography, online revised edition
