= Ständchen, WAB 84.2 =

1846 lied composed by Anton Bruckner

Ständchen
- Secular choral work by Anton Bruckner
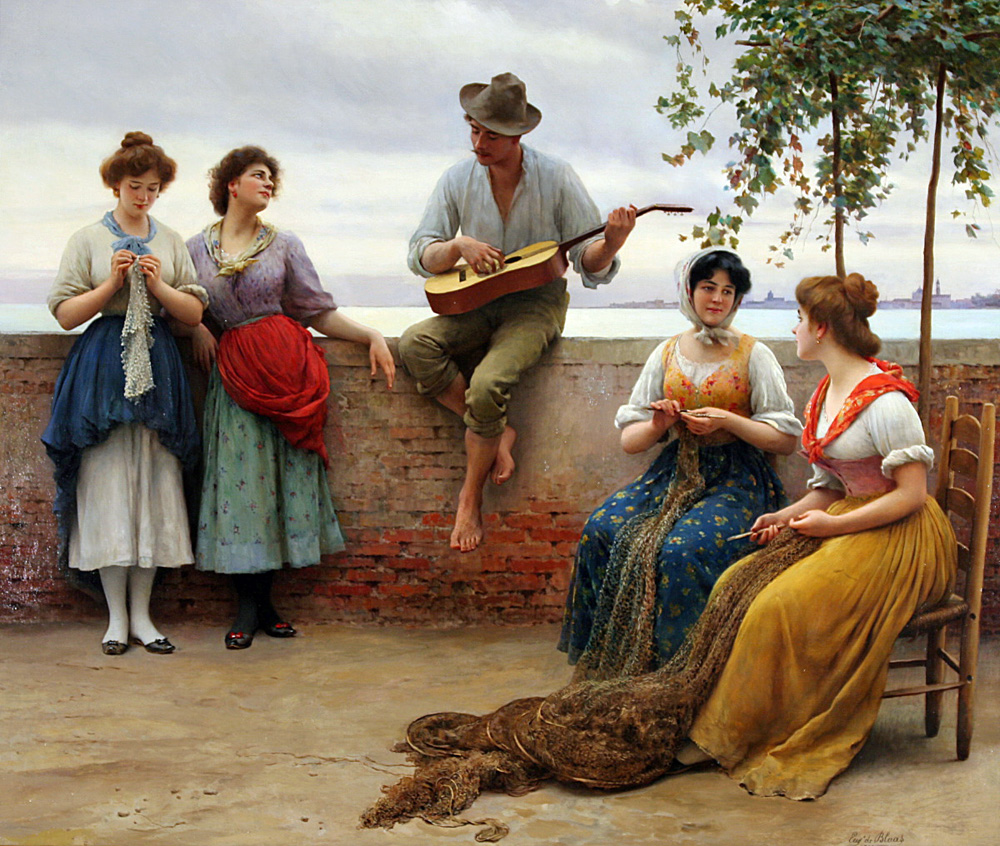
- Eugene de Blaas – "The Serenade"
- Key: G major
- Catalogue: WAB 84.2
- Language: German
- Composed: c. 1846: St. Florian
- Dedication: Frau Schlager
- Published: 1932: Regensburg
- Vocal: TTBB quartet, tenor soloist

"Ständchen" ("Serenade"), WAB 84.2, is a Lied composed by Anton Bruckner in c. 1846.

== History ==
Bruckner composed this serenade, which he dedicated to Mrs. Schlager, the wife of the mayor of St. Florian, during the beginning of his stay in St. Florian. For the composition Bruckner used a text, which he had already used for the unfinished lied Wie des Bächleins Silberquelle, WAB 84.1.

It is not known when the piece was performed. The work, of which the original manuscript is stored in the archive of the Liedertafel Frohsinn, was first issued in Band II/2, pp. 61–64 of the Göllerich/Auer biography. It was thereafter issued in 1954, together with Sternschnuppen, in the Chorblattreihe of Robitschek, Vienna. It is issued in Band XXIII/2, No. 3 of the Gesamtausgabe.

== Text ==
Ständchen is using a text of an unknown author (possibly Ernst Marinelli).

Wie des Bächleins Silberquelle
Ruhig durch die Fluren bricht
Und des Mondes goldne Helle
Freundlich uns zum Herzen spricht:

Wandle froh durchs Leben weiter,
Frei von Kummer und von Leid,
Jeder Tag beginne heiter
Und entflieh' mit Seligkeit.

As the creek's silvery source
Breaks calmly through the fields
And the moon's golden light
Speaks friendly to our heart:

Walk happily through your further life,
Free from sorrow and pain,
May each day begin cheerfully
And end in blessedness.

== Music ==
The 29-bar long work in 6/8 is in G major. It is scored for TTBB quartet and tenor soloist. During the first 18 bars the text is sung by the tenor soloist with accompaniment of humming voices. From bar 19, the second part (Wandle froh durchs Leben weiter) is sung again by the men's quartet.

== Discography ==
There is a single recording of Bruckner's Ständchen:

- Thomas Kerbl, Quartet of the Männerchorvereinigung Bruckner 12, Michael Nowak (tenor), Weltliche Männerchöre – CD: LIVA 054, 2012

== Sources ==
- August Göllerich, Anton Bruckner. Ein Lebens- und Schaffens-Bild, c. 1922 – posthumous edited by Max Auer by G. Bosse, Regensburg, 1932
- Anton Bruckner – Sämtliche Werke, Band XXIII/2: Weltliche Chorwerke (1843–1893), Musikwissenschaftlicher Verlag der Internationalen Bruckner-Gesellschaft, Angela Pachovsky and Anton Reinthaler (editor), Vienna, 1989
- Uwe Harten, Anton Bruckner. Ein Handbuch. Residenz Verlag, Salzburg, 1996. ISBN 3-7017-1030-9.
- Cornelis van Zwol, Anton Bruckner 1824–1896 – Leven en werken, uitg. Thoth, Bussum, Netherlands, 2012. ISBN 978-90-6868-590-9
- Crawford Howie, Anton Bruckner - A documentary biography, online revised edition
