= Trauungschor, WAB 49 =

1865 wedding song composed by Anton Bruckner

Trauungschor
- Secular choral work by Anton Bruckner
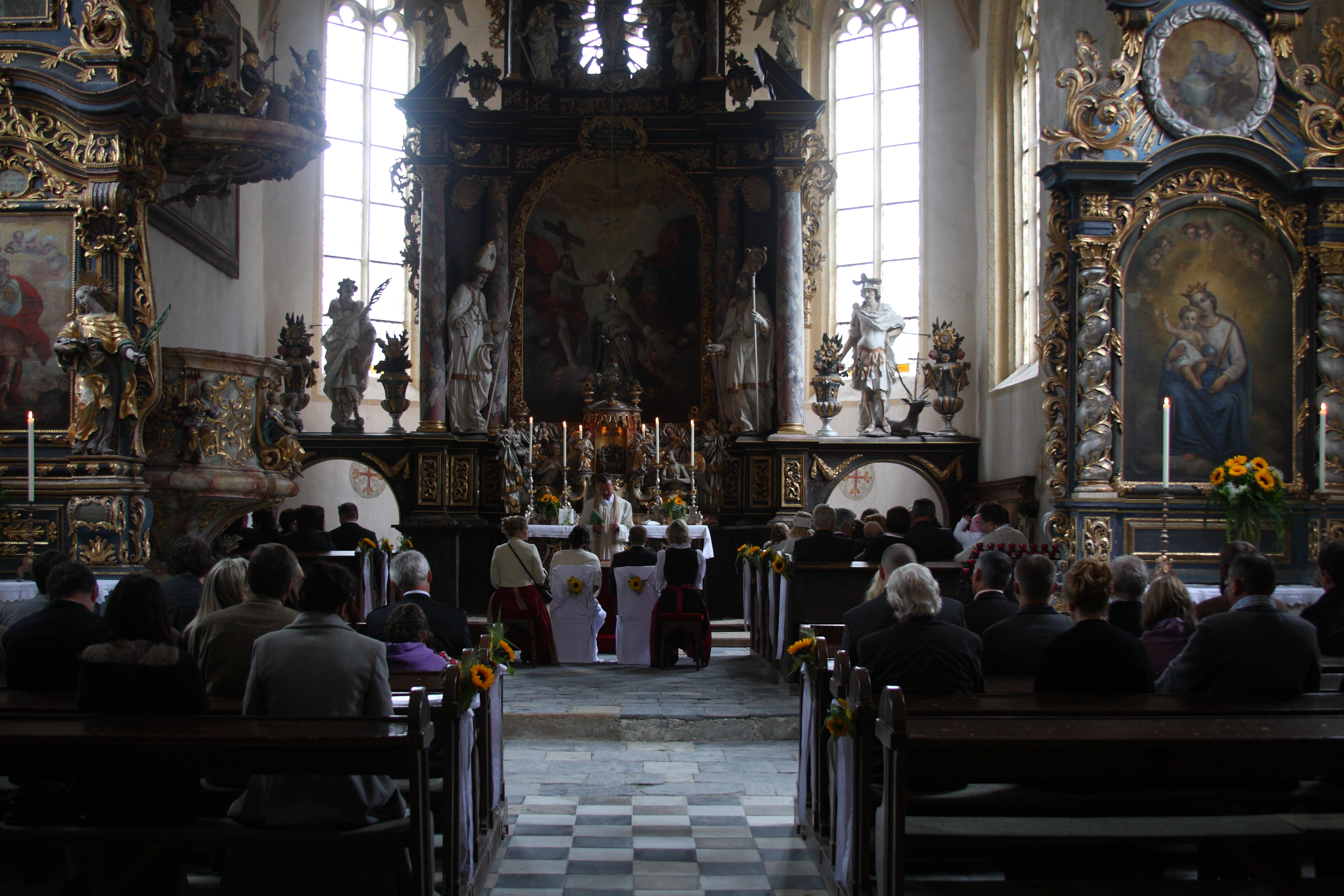
- A wedding ceremony in Austria
- Key: F major
- Catalogue: WAB 49
- Form: Wedding music
- Language: German
- Composed: 8 January 1865: Linz
- Dedication: Wedding of Karl Kerschbaum
- Published: 1932: Regensburg
- Vocal: TTBB choir & vocal quartet
- Instrumental: Organ

Trauungschor ("Wedding chorus"), WAB 49, is a wedding song composed by Anton Bruckner on 8 January 1865.

== History ==
Bruckner composed the setting for the wedding ceremony of his friend Karl Kerschbaum, chairman of the Liedertafel Frohsinn, with Maria Schimatschek, a concert singer and daughter of Franz Schimatschek. The sacred piece was performed by Frohsinn, with Bruckner at the organ, on 5 February 1865 during the celebration of the wedding in the Linzer Stadtpfarrkirche (Linz Parish Church).

The original manuscript is stored in the Frohsinn-archive of the Linzer Singakademie. After this single performance the music fell into oblivion. It was first published in band III/2, pp. 219–224 of the Göllerich/Auer biography. It is put in Band XXIII/2, No. 18 of the Gesamtausgabe.

== Text ==
The work uses a text by Franz Isidor Proschko.

O schöner Tag, o dreimal sel’ge Stunde,
wo ich empfing das neue Sakrament,
wo Gottes Priester meine Hand gesegnet,
zum heiligen Bunde, den der Tod nur trennt.

Wollt ihr sanft wie Engel wandeln
eure Bahn durch diese Zeit,
nehmt im Denken, nehmt im Handeln
nur den Frieden zum Geleit!

O beautiful day, o three times blessed hour,
When I received the new sacrament,
When God's priest blessed my hand
To the holy band, which only death will cut.

If you want to walk softly like angels
Your way through this time,
Take in mind, take in action
Only peace as your guidance!

== Music ==
The in total 55-bar long work in F major is scored for TTBB choir, voice quartet, and organ. The setting of the first strophe (bars 1 to 17) is sung by the choir. The setting of the second strophe (bars 18 to 38) is sung by the vocal quartet. Thereafter the setting of the first strophe is repeated da capo.

In the newspaper Linzer Zeitung of 8 February 1865 the work was praised as a unique product of a creative spirit (originelle Geistesschöpfung).

== Discography ==
There are two recordings of the Trauungschor:

- Thomas Kerbl, Chorvereinigung Bruckner 08, Anton Bruckner Männerchöre – CD: LIVA 027, 2008
- * Yoshihiko Iwasa, MGV Tokyo Lieder Tafel 1925 (TLT), MGV Tokyo Lieder Tafel 1925 - CD issued by the choir, 2016

== Sources ==
- August Göllerich, Anton Bruckner. Ein Lebens- und Schaffens-Bild, c. 1922 – posthumous edited by Max Auer by G. Bosse, Regensburg, 1932
- Anton Bruckner – Sämtliche Werke, Band XXIII/2: Weltliche Chorwerke (1843–1893), Musikwissenschaftlicher Verlag der Internationalen Bruckner-Gesellschaft, Angela Pachovsky and Anton Reinthaler (Editor), Vienna, 1989
- Cornelis van Zwol, Anton Bruckner 1824–1896 – Leven en werken, uitg. Thoth, Bussum, Netherlands, 2012. ISBN 978-90-6868-590-9
- Crawford Howie, Anton Bruckner - A documentary biography, online revised edition
