= Des Dankes Wort sei mir vergönnt, WAB 62 =

Song composed by Anton Bruckner

Des Dankes Wort sei mir vergönnt
- Secular choral work by Anton Bruckner
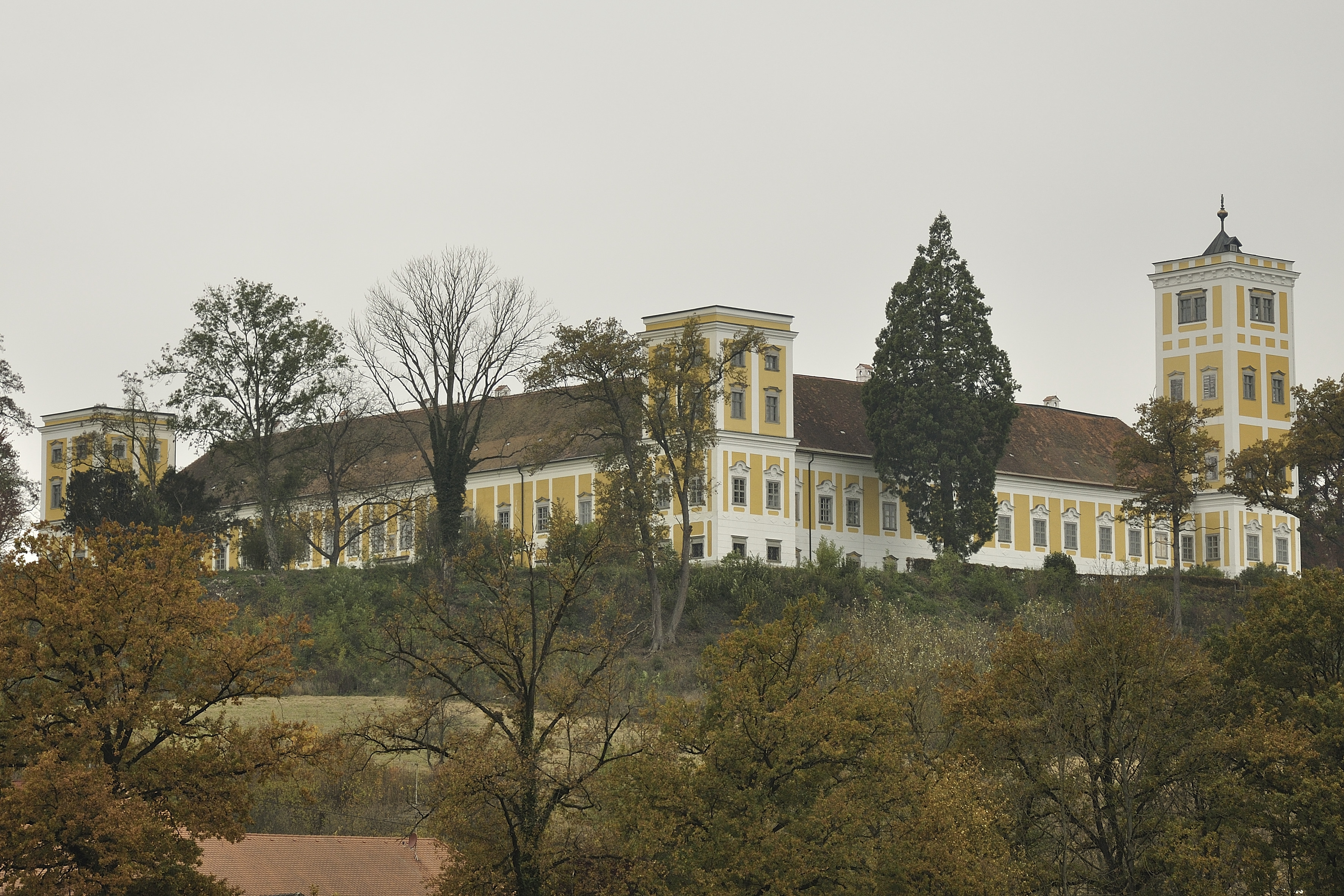
- Tillysburg Castle
- Key: F major
- Catalogue: WAB 62
- Text: Ernst Marinelli
- Language: German
- Composed: c. 1845: Sankt Florian
- Dedication: Earl Charles O'Hegerty
- Published: 1989: Vienna
- Vocal: TTTBB choir and soloists

Des Dankes Wort sei mir vergönnt (Let grant me to say a word of thanks), WAB 62, is a song composed by Anton Bruckner during his stay in Sankt Florian.

== History ==
Bruckner composed this song on a text of Ernst Marinelli between 1845 and 1855, during his stay in Sankt Florian. He dedicated the work as thanks to Earl Charles O'Hegerty, the occupant of Tillysburg Castle, near Sankt Florian. It is not known when the song was performed at that time. On 13 May 1996 the work was performed again on the authentic location (Tillysburg Castle).

The original manuscript of the work is lost, but a copy by Karl Aigner is stored in the archives of the Österreichische Nationalbibliothek. The work is issued in Band XXIII/2, No. 11 of the Gesamtausgabe.

== Text ==
Des Dankes Wort sei mir vergönnt uses a text by Ernst Marinelli.

Des Dankes Wort sei mir vergönnt
Dir heute zu verkünden.
O daß ich würdig singen könnt'
Mein freudiges Empfinden,
Das mich an diesem Tag belebt,
Dem Freudentag der Deinen,
An dem dich Lieb' und Dank umschwebt,
Wenn alle sich vereinen.

Dem Vater gilt das erste Hoch!
Es ruft's der Kinder Reigen,
Die wie ein liebes, sanftes Joch
An deiner Brust sich neigen
Du zählst die teuren Häupter all,
Die Häupter deiner Lieben.
O weine nicht, die volle Zahl
Macht ja ein Engel drüben.

Das zweite Hoch, nicht minder wahr,
Schallt wie aus einem Munde,
Dies bringet dir der Freunde Schar
Im edlen treuen Bunde
Und die das Leben Dir vereint,
Stehen sie auch noch so ferne.
Du hast's mit ihnen wohl gemeint,
Hoch! rufen sie dir gerne.

Und dieses Hoch erschallet laut,
Schallt wohl mit hundert Stimmen,
Die alle, wo sie dir vertraut,
Zu frohem Dank entglimmen.
Der Arme ruft's, den du erquickt,
Der Diener, den du dir erkoren,
Der Sänger, den du hoch beglückt,
Und der den Dank dir zugeschworen.

Let grant me today to say
A word of thanks to you.
O, that I could respectfully sing
My happy feeling,
Which lightens me up this day,
The day of delight of yours,
During which love and thanks surround you,
When all are joining!

The first cheer is for the father,
Shouted by the children,
Who, as a dear and sweet yoke,
Bend themselves at your chest.
You tell all their dear heads,
The heads of your beloved.
O, do not cry, the full number
Is made by an angel over there.

The second cheer, not less worthy,
It sounds as from one mouth,
Is brought to you by the host of friends
In noble and faithful bond
Who join your life,
Even if they are faraway.
You have good intentions for them,
Cheers! they like to call you.

And this cheer may sound loudly,
Sound well with hundred voices,
All those, who are dear to you,
Arise a happy thanks.
The poor, whom you revived,
The servant, whom you have chosen,
The singer, whom you make happy,
And who swears you their thanks.

The "angel", to whom the text refers, could be O'Hegerty's wife, who deceased in 1845, or his son, who deceased in 1854.

== Music ==
The 89-bar long work in F major is scored for TTTBB choir with humming voices and soloists.

The song begins with a tenor soloist with accompaniment of humming voices. From bar 15 ("Wenn alle sich vereinen") the choir takes it over. On bar 23 ("O weine nicht,"), the tenor soloist takes it over with again accompaniment of humming voices. The choir takes it again over at the beginning of the third strophe. The same process is repeated on bar 46 ("Du hast's mit ihnen wohl gemeint,") with a bass soloist, and on bar 68 ("Der Arme ruft's,") with two tenor soloists. Thereafter, the choir goes till the end with a repeat of the first part of the fourth strophe.

== Discography ==
There is a single recording of Des Dankes Wort sei mir vergönnt.

- Thomas Kerbl, Männerchorvereinigung Bruckner 12, Weltliche Männerchöre – CD: LIVA 054, 2012

== Sources ==
- Anton Bruckner – Sämtliche Werke, Band XXIII/2: Weltliche Chorwerke (1843–1893), Musikwissenschaftlicher Verlag der Internationalen Bruckner-Gesellschaft, Angela Pachovsky and Anton Reinthaler (Editor), Vienna, 1989
- Cornelis van Zwol, Anton Bruckner 1824–1896 – Leven en werken, uitg. Thoth, Bussum, Netherlands, 2012. ISBN 978-90-6868-590-9
- Uwe Harten, Anton Bruckner. Ein Handbuch. Residenz Verlag, Salzburg, 1996. ISBN 3-7017-1030-9.
