= Der Lehrerstand, WAB 77 =

1847 song composed by Anton Bruckner

Der Lehrerstand
- Secular choral work by Anton Bruckner
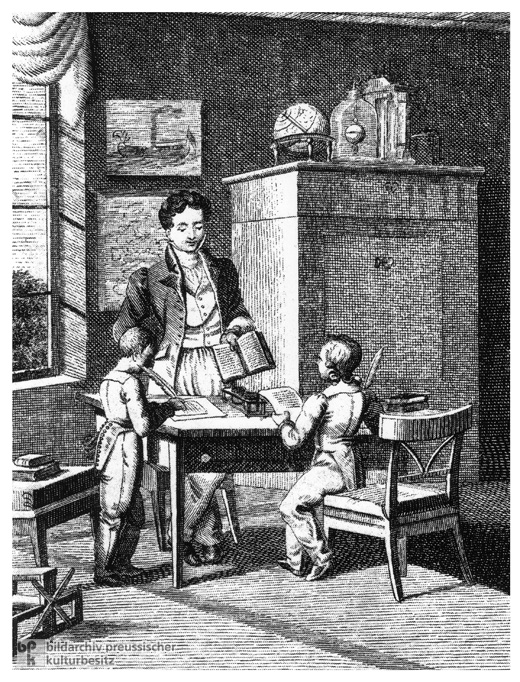
- Private education in the early 19th century
- Key: E-flat major
- Catalogue: WAB 77
- Language: German
- Composed: c. 1847: Sankt Florian
- Dedication: Michael Bogner
- Published: 1932: Regensburg
- Vocal: TTBB choir and voice quartet

Der Lehrerstand (The post of the teacher), WAB 77, is a song composed by Anton Bruckner in c. 1847 during his stay in Sankt Florian.

== History ==
Bruckner composed this plea for the teachers on a text possibly of Ernst Marinelli in c. 1847 during his stay in Sankt Florian. Bruckner dedicated the work to his superior, schoolmaster Michael Bogner.

The song was possibly performed by the Liedertafel St. Florian for celebrating Bogner's 45th birthday.

The original manuscript of the work is lost, but copies are stored in the archives of the Liedertafel St. Florian and of the Österreichische Nationalbibliothek. The work, which was first issued in Band II/2, pp. 16–22, of the Göllerich/Auer biography, is issued in Band XXIII/2, No. 4 of the Gesamtausgabe.

== Text ==
Der Lehrerstand uses a text possibly by Ernst Marinelli.

Die Zeit weiset auf einen Stand,
Der wenig gilt, doch allen nützt,
Den leider! mancher hier zuland
Weder ehret noch unterstützt.
Ist jener Stand euch nicht bekannt?
Es ist der wackre Lehrerstand.

Jener Stand ist in seinem Glück,
Wenn sein segensreiches Walten
Auf den Menschen wirkt zurück.
Tätigkeit und freies Schalten
Werden enden bald den Hohn,
Der meistens war bisher sein Lohn.

Trägheit war und ist ihm verhaßt,
Weil er nur Fleiß und Ordnung liebt.
Gern trägt er der Beschwerden Last,
Ist geduldig und nie betrübt,
Auch dann nicht, wenn ihn drückt die Not,
Und den Seinigen mangelt Brot.

Mehrmals ward er der Toren Spott,
Doch verließ ihn nie der Edelmut,
Fest vertrauend auf einen Gott,
Der ist und bleibt sein höchstes Gut.
Immer ernsthaft und bescheiden
Bleibt er selbst in Freud und Leiden.

Kennt ihr den Stand, der Geister weckt,
Das Kind fürs Leben brauchbar macht,
Oft wurde er mit Schmach bedeckt,
Von Narren auch sogar verlacht.
Höret! Dies ist der Lehrerstand,
Der so viel nützt dem Vaterland.

Für Menschenwohl und Menschenglück
Kämpfe fort, du wackrer Stand!
Es wird sich ändern dein Geschick
In einem bessern Vaterland.
Dort empfange von Gottes Sohn
Deinen verkürzten Erdenlohn.

Time points at a post,
Which is little estimated, but serves everyone,
Which, alas! many in this country
Neither honour nor support.
Do you not know this post?
It is the brave post of the teacher.

That post is in its joy,
When its beneficial effects
Reach back to people.
Work and free action
Will soon end the scorn,
Which was till now mostly its reward.

It hated and hates idleness,
Because it only loves diligence and order.
Gladly it carries the heavy burden,
Is patient and never saddened,
Not even when oppressed by poverty,
And the family lacking bread.

It was often the mockery of the foolish,
But never lost generosity,
Trusting firmly in God,
Who is and remains his greatest good.
Always serious and modest
Remaining even in joy and pain.

Do you know the post which wakes up the mind,
Makes the child fit for life,
It was often rewarded with disgrace
Ridiculed by fools.
Listen! This is the post of the teacher,
Which is so useful for the fatherland.

For the welfare and happiness of people
Fight further, you brave post!
Your fate will change
In a better fatherland,
Where you will receive from God's Son
Your reward shortened on earth.

== Music ==
The 84-bar long work in E-flat major is scored for TTBB choir and voice quartet. The choir starts in 4/4. On bar 14 ("Jener Stand ist in seinem Glück") the voice quartet takes it over in 3/4. On bar 45 ("Mehrmals ward er der Toren Spott"), the choir takes it over in 4/4, turning from bar 60 ("Kennt ihr den Stand, der Geister weckt") into 6/8, and from bar 72 ("Für Menschenwohl und Menschenglück") again in 4/4 till the end. This first larger work for men's choir tries for original traits, decent effects and expressive differentiation.

== Discography ==
- Thomas Kerbl, Männerchorvereinigung Bruckner 12, Weltliche Männerchöre – CD: LIVA 054, 2012
- Markus Stumpner, Erinnerung - Bruckner in St. Florian, St. Florianer Sängerknaben, Solo Musica SM 450, 2024 - Arr. for Choir & Fortepiano by Franz Farnberger

== Sources ==
- August Göllerich, Anton Bruckner. Ein Lebens- und Schaffens-Bild, c. 1922 – posthumous edited by Max Auer by G. Bosse, Regensburg, 1932
- Anton Bruckner – Sämtliche Werke, Band XXIII/2: Weltliche Chorwerke (1843–1893), Musikwissenschaftlicher Verlag der Internationalen Bruckner-Gesellschaft, Angela Pachovsky and Anton Reinthaler (Editor), Vienna, 1989
- Cornelis van Zwol, Anton Bruckner 1824–1896 – Leven en werken, uitg. Thoth, Bussum, Netherlands, 2012. ISBN 978-90-6868-590-9
- Uwe Harten, Anton Bruckner. Ein Handbuch. Residenz Verlag, Salzburg, 1996. ISBN 3-7017-1030-9.
- Crawford Howie, Anton Bruckner - A documentary biography, online revised edition
