= Das Lied vom deutschen Vaterland, WAB 78 =

1845 song composed by Anton Bruckner

Das Lied vom deutschen Vaterland
- Secular choral work by Anton Bruckner
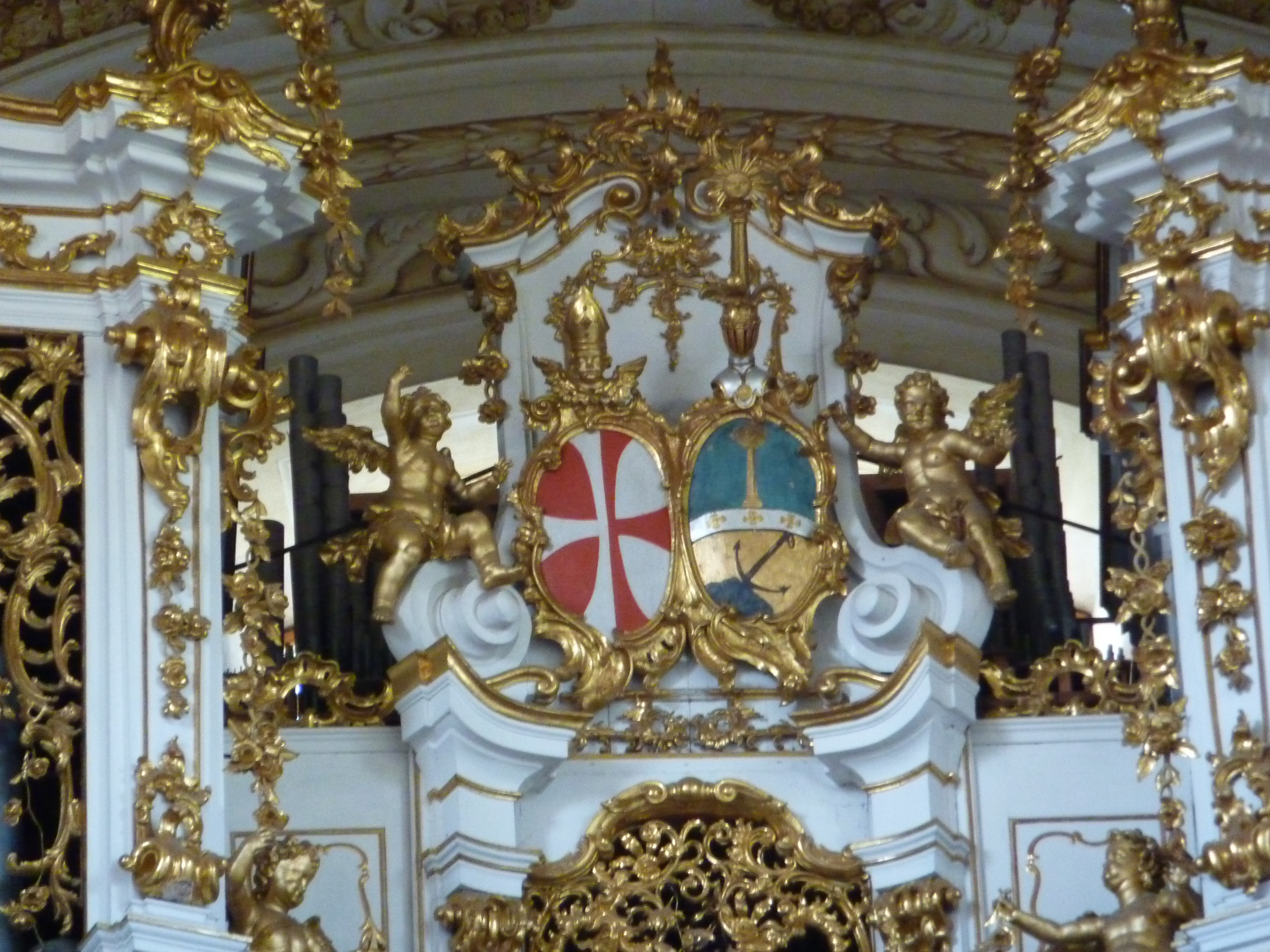
- Coat of arms of the St. Florian Abbey
- Key: D-flat major
- Catalogue: WAB 78
- Language: German
- Composed: c. 1845: St. Florian
- Dedication: Hans Schläger
- Published: 1932: Regensburg
- Vocal: TTBB choir

Das Lied vom deutschen Vaterland, WAB 78, is a patriotic song composed by Anton Bruckner in c. 1845 during his stay in St. Florian.

== History ==
Bruckner composed this work on a text of an unknown author c. 1845 during his stay in St. Florian. He dedicated it to Hans Schläger, the founder of the St. Florian choir.

The original manuscript is stored in the archive of the St. Florian Abbey. It was performed on 11 November 1921 in St. Florian by Franz Xaver Müller for the 25th anniversary of the composer's death.

The work, which was first issued in Band II/2, pp. 14–15, of the Göllerich/Auer biography, is issued in Band XXIII/2, No. 2 of the Gesamtausgabe.

== Lyrics ==
"Das Lied vom deutschen Vaterland" uses lyrics by an unknown author.

Wohlauf, ihr Genossen, stimmt an, stimmt an,
Und hört ihr die Hörner nicht dröhnen?
Und seht ihr nicht funkeln den goldenen Wein,
Stimmt ein mit freudigen Tönen
Und singet im Hochklang Hand in Hand
Das Lied vom deutschen Vaterland.

Up, companions, intone, intone,
And do you not hear the droning horns?
And do you not see the sparkling golden wine,
Join us in with happy sounds
And sing in high tone, hand in hand
The song of the German fatherland.

== Music ==
The 20-bar long work in D-flat major is scored for TTBB choir. The sung begins with a Bruckner's typical octave leap in all four voices.

In 1906, Franz Xaver Müller added three additional strophes to the song.

== Discography ==
There is a single recording of Das Lied vom deutschen Vaterland:

- Thomas Kerbl, Männerchorvereinigung 12, Weltliche Männerchöre – CD: LIVA 054, 2012

== Sources ==
- August Göllerich, Anton Bruckner. Ein Lebens- und Schaffens-Bild, c. 1922 – posthumous edited by Max Auer by G. Bosse, Regensburg, 1932
- Anton Bruckner – Sämtliche Werke, Band XXIII/2: Weltliche Chorwerke (1843–1893), Musikwissenschaftlicher Verlag der Internationalen Bruckner-Gesellschaft, Angela Pachovsky and Anton Reinthaler (Editor), Vienna, 1989
- Cornelis van Zwol, Anton Bruckner 1824–1896 – Leven en werken, uitg. Thoth, Bussum, Netherlands, 2012. ISBN 978-90-6868-590-9
- Uwe Harten, Anton Bruckner. Ein Handbuch. Residenz Verlag, Salzburg, 1996. ISBN 3-7017-1030-9.
