= Am Grabe, WAB 2 =

1861 elegy composed by Anton Bruckner

Am Grabe
- Secular choral work by Anton Bruckner
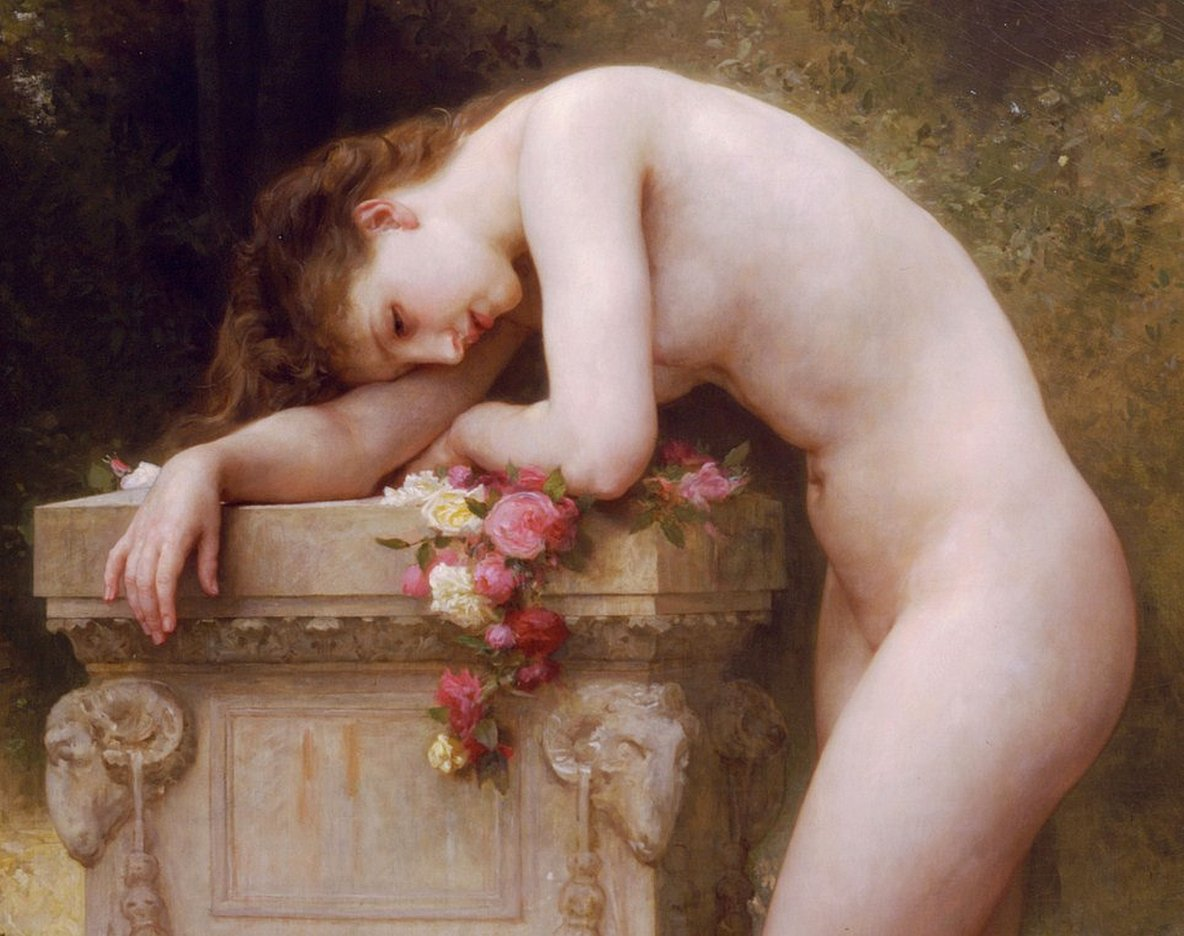
- Elegy by William-Adolphe Bouguereau
- Key: F minor
- Catalogue: WAB 2
- Form: Elegy
- Language: German
- Composed: 1861: Linz
- Dedication: Funeral of Josephine Hafferl
- Published: 1924: Vienna
- Vocal: TTBB choir

Am Grabe (At the grave), WAB 2, is an elegy composed by Anton Bruckner in 1861, for men's voices a capella.

== History ==
Am Grabe is a revised a cappella setting of the elegy Vor Arneths Grab, WAB 53. The elegy was performed on the funeral of Josephine Hafferl on 11 February 1861.

The original manuscript is stored in the archive of the Liedertafel Frohsinn. The song, which was edited first by Wöß, Universal Edition, in 1924, is put in Band XXIII/2, No. 13 of the Gesamtausgabe.

In addition, an autograph slight revision of the song has been found on an undated copy of the manuscript (Mus.Hs. 2104).

== Music ==
The 21-bar-long, a cappella setting discarded the fourth strophe of Marinelli's text. The voice score of the first two strophes (bars 1-8) is almost identical to that of Vor Arneths Grab. The score of the third strophe is 5 bars longer. From bar 15 the score is different and ends at bars 19-21 alike bars 26-28 of the original setting.

A score with another text by Gottfried Grote has been issued by Schott Music in 1961.

Lasset uns den Leib begraben,
überwindet Leid und Schmerz,
denkt der Hoffnung, die wir haben:
Gottes Weg führt heimatwärts.

Nicht für immer ist entschwunden,
der uns liebend war gesellt,
denn wer hier mit Gott verbunden,
freut sich dort der neuen Welt.

Drum laßt uns den Herren preisen,
der zum Heimgang ihn erwählt,
und an uns will treu beweisen,
daß im Leid sein Trost nicht fehlt.

Let us bury the body,
conquer suffering and hurt,
think of the hope that we have:
Gods way leads towards [our] homeland.

Not for ever is gone,
who was our loving company,
because who is connected to God here,
will enjoy the New World there.

Therefore let us praise the Lord,
who chose him to go home,
and will faithfully prove to us
that in suffering, consolation will not be missing.

There is also an arrangement by Jeff Reynolds for 4-part trombone ensemble (with optional contrabass trombone part).

== Discography ==
There is only one recording of the full setting of Am Grabe:

- Łukasz Borowicz, Anton Bruckner: Requiem, RIAS Kammerchor Berlin, Akademie für Alte Musik Berlin – CD: Accentus ACC30474, 2019 - revised version (Cohrs edition, based on manuscript Mus.Hs. 2104).

NB: On CD LIVA 027, only the first two strophes were recorded.

== Sources ==
- August Göllerich, Anton Bruckner. Ein Lebens- und Schaffens-Bild, c. 1922 – posthumous edited by Max Auer by G. Bosse, Regensburg, 1932
- Anton Bruckner – Sämtliche Werke, Band XXIII/2: Weltliche Chorwerke (1843–1893), Musikwissenschaftlicher Verlag der Internationalen Bruckner-Gesellschaft, Angela Pachovsky and Anton Reinthaler (Editor), Vienna, 1989
- Cornelis van Zwol, Anton Bruckner 1824–1896 – Leven en werken, uitg. Thoth, Bussum, Netherlands, 2012. ISBN 978-90-6868-590-9
- Crawford Howie, Anton Bruckner - A documentary biography, online revised edition
