= Die Geburt, WAB 69 =

1851 song composed by Anton Bruckner

Die Geburt
- Secular choral work by Anton Bruckner
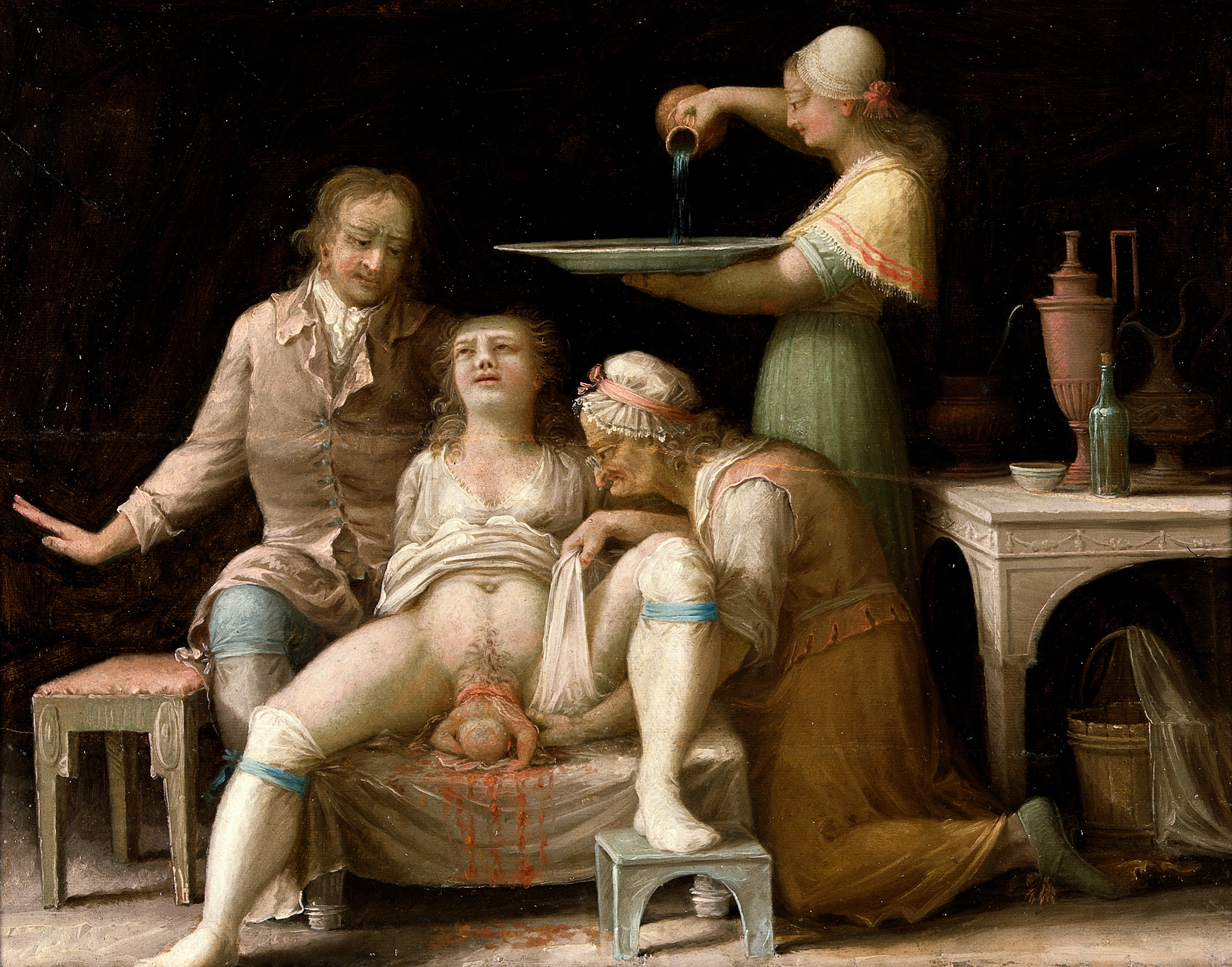
- A birth-scene
- Key: D-flat major
- Catalogue: WAB 69
- Language: German
- Composed: 1851: St. Florian
- Dedication: Name day of Josef Seiberl
- Published: 1932: Regensburg
- Vocal: TTBB choir

Die Geburt (The birth), WAB 69, is a song composed by Anton Bruckner in 1851 during his stay in St. Florian.

== History ==
Bruckner composed this work on a text of an unknown author in 1851 during his stay in St. Florian. On 19 March 1852, he dedicated the song to his friend Josef Seiberl to celebrate his name day. It is not known whether it was performed at that time.

The original manuscript is stored in the archive of Wels. The work, which was first issued in Band II/2, pp. 147-150, of the Göllerich/Auer biography, is issued in Band XXIII/2, No. 8 of the Gesamtausgabe.

== Text ==
Die Geburt uses a text by an unknown author.

Es landet ein Fremdling im Hafen der Welt,
Hat Mangel an allem, an Nahrung und Geld.
O Fremdling, o setze den Fuß auf das Land,
Wir reichen dir alle so freundlich die Hand.
Herein, herein, herein,
Sollst lieber Verwandter uns sein.

Und hast du das deine dann redlich getan,
So kannst du dem Vater im Himmel dich nah'n,
Dann preisen dich Menschen und freuen sich dein
Und wiegen im schlummernden Grabe dich ein.
Zur Ruh', zur Ruh', zur Ruh,
So gehörst du der Heimat dann zu.

A stranger landed in the harbour of the world,
Had lack at everything, food and money.
O stranger, put your foot on the land,
We all reach out so friendly to you.
Come in, come in, come in,
You will be our dear relative.

And once you did your duty fairly,
Then you can approach the Father in the Heaven,
Then people praise you and enjoy you,
And cradle you in the slumbering grave.
To rest, to rest, to rest,
So you belong to the [heavenly] homeland.

== Music ==
The 25-bar long work in D-flat major is scored for TTBB choir. The feurige (ardent) first 12 bars, in periods of 4 bars, have to be repeated three times - presumably foreseen for four couplets, of which only one has been retrieved. From bar 13, Und hast du das deine dann redlich getan, the Schubert-like song evolves slower to the end.

== Sources ==
- August Göllerich, Anton Bruckner. Ein Lebens- und Schaffens-Bild, c. 1922 – posthumous edited by Max Auer by G. Bosse, Regensburg, 1932
- Anton Bruckner – Sämtliche Werke, Band XXIII/2: Weltliche Chorwerke (1843–1893), Musikwissenschaftlicher Verlag der Internationalen Bruckner-Gesellschaft, Angela Pachovsky and Anton Reinthaler (Editor), Vienna, 1989
- Cornelis van Zwol, Anton Bruckner 1824–1896 – Leven en werken, uitg. Thoth, Bussum, Netherlands, 2012. ISBN 978-90-6868-590-9
- Uwe Harten, Anton Bruckner. Ein Handbuch. Residenz Verlag, Salzburg, 1996. ISBN 3-7017-1030-9.
- Crawford Howie, Anton Bruckner - A documentary biography, online revised edition
