= Du bist wie eine Blume, WAB 64 =

1861 song composed by Anton Bruckner

Du bist wie eine Blume
- Secular choral work by Anton Bruckner
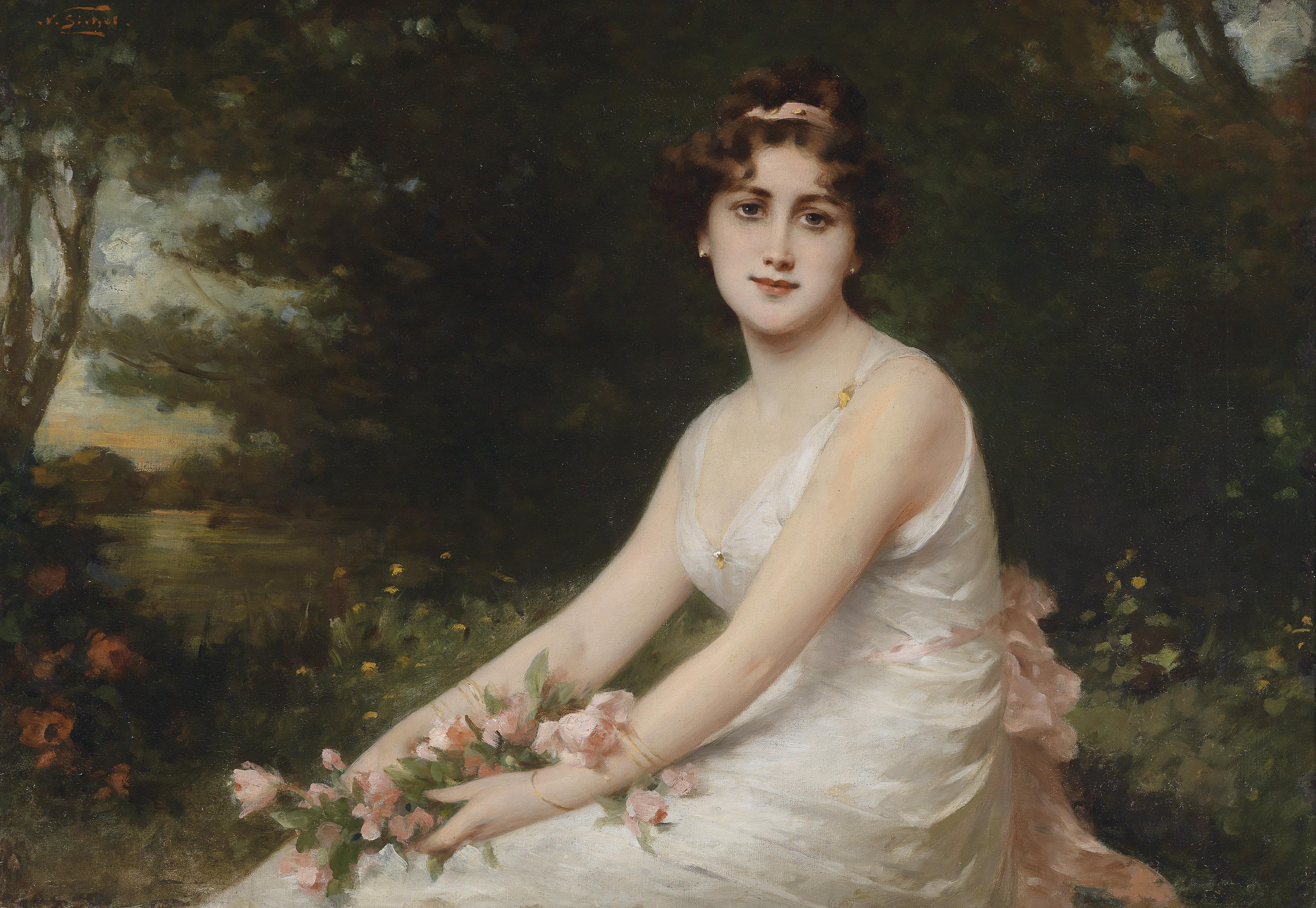
- Junge Dame mit Rosen am Seeufer, Nathanael Sichel
- Key: F major,
- Catalogue: WAB 64
- Text: Heinrich Heine
- Language: German
- Composed: 5 December 1861: Linz
- Dedication: Liedertafel Sängerbund
- Published: 1932: Regensburg
- Vocal: SATB quartet

Du bist wie eine Blume (You are like a flower), WAB 64, is a song, which Anton Bruckner composed in 1861.

== History ==
Bruckner composed the song on a text of Heinrich Heine on 5 December 1861. On request of his friend Alois Weinwurm, Bruckner composed the song for the opening concert of the Liedertafel Sängerbund.

The piece was performed 10 days later under Bruckner's baton in the Redoutensaal of Linz by four soloists: Hermine and Wilhelmine Ritter, Heinrich Knoll and Ferdinand Hummel. The piece became a favourite of Sängerbund.

Bruckner's manuscript of 5 December 1861 (A-LIsakaWAB64) is stored in the archive of the city of Linz.
Another undated work manuscript (Mus.Hs.3166) is stored in the archive of the Österreichische Nationalbibliothek. A copy of this work manuscript was first published in Band III/2, pp. 193–196 of the Göllerich/Auer biography.
A score based on manuscript A-LIsakaWAB64 is issued in Band XXIII/2, No. 14 of the Gesamtausgabe.

== Text ==
The song uses a text of Heinrich Heine's Buch der Lieder (Book of Songs).

Du bist wie eine Blume,
So hold und schön und rein;
Ich schau dich an, und Wehmut
Schleicht mir ins Herz hinein.

Mir ist, als ob ich die Hände
Aufs Haupt dir legen sollt',
Betend, dass Gott dich erhalte
So rein und schön und hold.

You are like a flower,
So lovely, fair and pure;
I gaze at you and wistful
Melancholy slips into my heart.

It's as though I ought to place
My hands upon your head
And pray God to ever keep you
So pure, fair, and lovely.

== Music ==
The 32-bar long work in F major is scored for SATB quartet.

== Discography ==
There are three recordings of the song:

- Johannes Hiemetsberger, Chorus sine nomine, Romantik rediscovered - European choral gems of the 19th century – CD: Helbling C8352CD, 2017
- Reiner E. Moritz, Anton Bruckner - The making of a giant – BR: Arthaus Musik NTSSC, 2021
  A recording of seven motets, and two Weltliche Chorwerke: Du bist wie eine Blume and the premiere of Vaterlandslied by Alexander Koller with Hard-Chor-Linz and the Linzer Sängerakademie, is together with the documentary.

NB: A live performance of the song can be heard on Youtube.

- Calmus Ensemble, Bruckner Vocal - Du bist wie eine Blume, WAB 64 – Carus, 2023 – Original performance for voice quartet

Note

- A fragment, sung by the Chor der Singakademie Linz, can be heard from the 30th minute of the videofilm Das Leben Anton Bruckners of Hans Conrad Fischer (1975).
- A performance by Stephen Cleobury with the BBC Choir (2011) is put in the Bruckner Archive: Charter Oak COR-2178 (box of 2 CDs).

== Sources ==
- August Göllerich, Anton Bruckner. Ein Lebens- und Schaffens-Bild, c. 1922 – posthumous edited by Max Auer by G. Bosse, Regensburg, 1932
- Anton Bruckner – Sämtliche Werke, Band XXIII/2: Weltliche Chorwerke (1843–1893), Musikwissenschaftlicher Verlag der Internationalen Bruckner-Gesellschaft, Angela Pachovsky and Anton Reinthaler (Editor), Vienna, 1989
- Cornelis van Zwol, Anton Bruckner 1824–1896 – Leven en werken, uitg. Thoth, Bussum, Netherlands, 2012. ISBN 978-90-6868-590-9
- Uwe Harten, Anton Bruckner. Ein Handbuch. Residenz Verlag, Salzburg, 1996. ISBN 3-7017-1030-9.
- Crawford Howie, Anton Bruckner - A documentary biography, online revised edition
