= Nachruf, WAB 81a =

1877 song composed by Anton Bruckner

Nachruf
- Secular choral work by Anton Bruckner
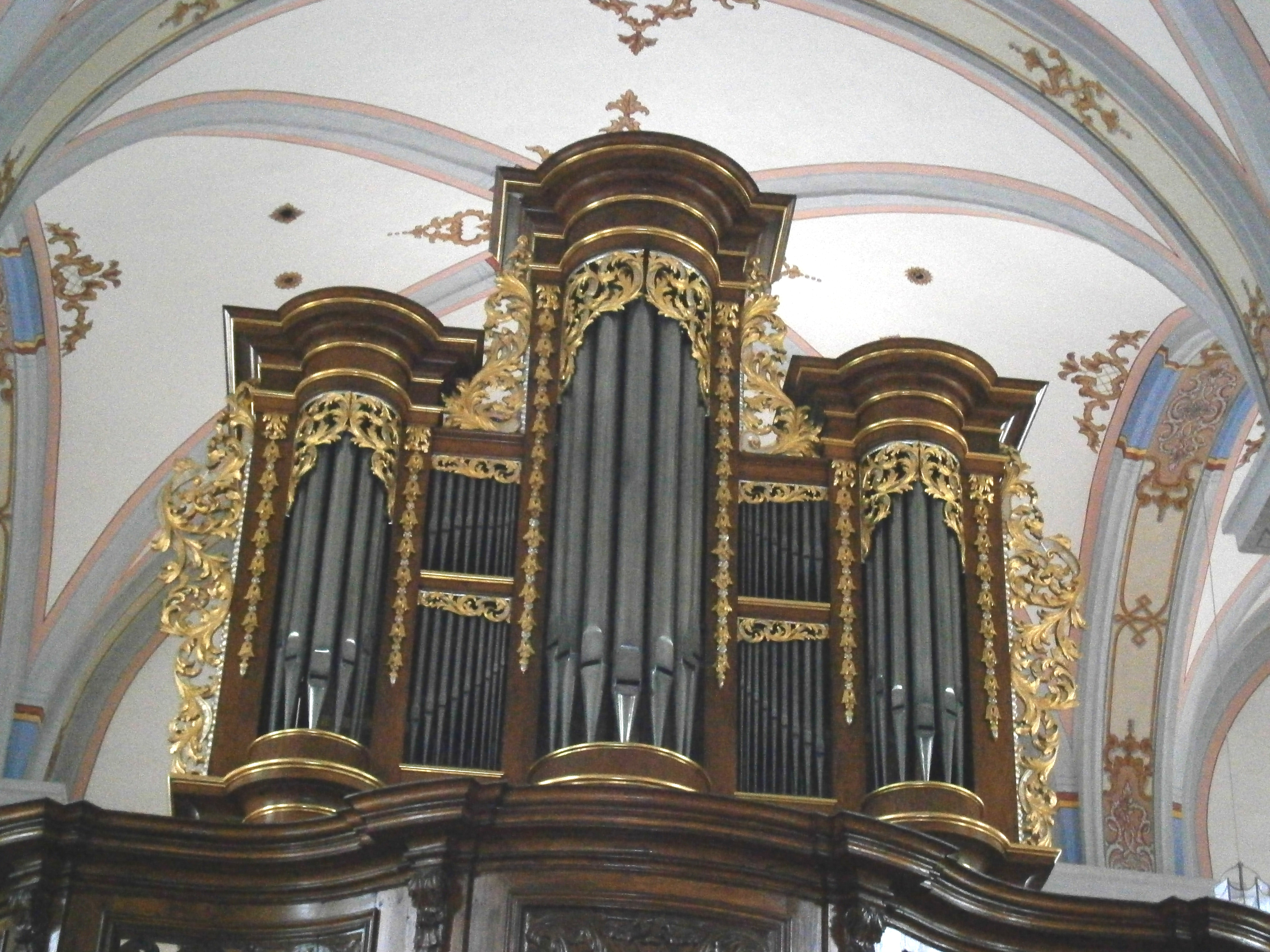
- The organ of the Karmeliterkirche, Beilstein
- Key: C minor
- Catalogue: WAB 81a
- Text: Heinrich von der Mattig
- Language: German
- Composed: 19 October 1877: Vienna
- Dedication: In memory of Joseph Seiberl
- Published: 1911: Vienna
- Vocal: TTBB choir
- Instrumental: Organ

Nachruf ("Obituary"), WAB 81a, is a song composed by Anton Bruckner in 1877 in memory of Joseph Seiberl. The song is better known as its 1886 reissue as Trösterin Musik ("Music, the Comforter"), WAB 81b.

== History ==
Bruckner composed the song on a text of Heinrich von der Mattig on 19 October 1877 in memory of his friend Joseph Seiberl, who died on 10 June 1877. The piece was performed nine days later by the Liedertafel Sängerbund in the St. Florian Abbey. The work, of which the original manuscript is stored in the Library of Congress in Washington, was first issued in Band XXIII/2, No. 28a of the Gesamtausgabe.

=== Trösterin Musik ===
In 1886 Rudolf Weinwurm asked August Seuffert, editor of the Wiener Zeitung, to write another text to fit to Bruckner's Nachruf. Weinwurm performed the revised setting as Trösterin Musik with the Wiener Akademischer Gesangverein in the Musikvereinsaal on 11 April 1886. The original manuscript is lost. A copy of it is stored in the Österreichische Nationalbibliothek. The revised setting, which was first edited by Viktor Keldorfer (Universal Edition) in 1911, is put in Band XXIII/2, No. 28b of the Gesamtausgabe.

== Text ==
Nachruf uses a text by Heinrich von der Mattig.

Vereint bist, Töneheld und Meister,
Mit jener hohen Schar der Geister,
Die hier schon höh'res Dasein führen,
Weil sie der Tonwelt Geist erspüren.

Du hast aus buntem Tongewühle
Gar oft in freiem Orgelspiele
Mit Kunst gelenkt die Melodien
Zu andachtsvollen Harmonien.

Drum mag's im Orgelstrome brausen
Und heut in Sturmakkorden sausen:
Vergessen bleibst du nie hienieden;
Du gabst uns Kunst, nun ruh' in Frieden!

You joined, hero and master of sounds,
This grand cohort of spirits,
Who here already ran a higher existence,
Because they sensed the spirit of the world of sounds.

You have from a chequered chaos of sound
Quite often in free organ play
Driven artfully the melodies
To devout harmonies.

Therefore may it roar in the organ's stream
And whiz today in stormy chords:
You will never be forgotten here on earth:
You gave us art, now rest in peace!

=== Trösterin Musik ===
The second setting as Trösterin Musik uses a text by August Seuffert.

Musik! Du herrliches Gebilde,
Voll hoher Macht, voll süßer Milde,
Wir fühlen doppelt tief dein Walten,
Wenn uns ein Leid das Herz gespalten.

Der Schmerzenswogen wirres Drängen,
Es glättet sich vor deinen Klängen,
Besänftigt all die Fluten ziehen
Ins weite Meer der Harmonien.

Wie Orgelton, wie Meereswogen
Kommt dann der Trost ins Herz gezogen
Und stillt der Seele wildes Sehnen
Und löst das Weh in milden Tränen.

Music! You lovely creation,
Full of high power and sweet mildness,
We feel double deep your motion,
When sorrow has split our hearts.

The clouded pressure of the waves of pain
It softens by your sounds,
Smoothly all the flows travel
In the wide sea of harmonies.

Like the tone of the organ and the waves of the sea,
The consolation draws then into the heart,
And calms the wild longings of the soul
And loosens the pain in mild tears.

== Music ==
The 51-bar long work in C minor is scored for TTBB choir and organ. The first 30 bars are sung a cappella. The organ is set fortissimo (in organo pleno with pedal) on bar 31 by the text "Drum mag's im Orgelstrome brausen". The song ends a cappella pianissimo on "nun ruh' in Frieden!".

== Selected discography ==
In the original setting as Nachruf the organ accompaniment from bar 31 is meaningful because of the profession of the defunct. In the second setting as Trösterin Musik, the organ accompaniment can, as many performers are doing, be removed without harming the sense of the piece. The second strophe, which is a variant of the first is also often omitted.

=== Nachruf ===
There is only one recording with the original text as Nachruf:

- Łukasz Borowicz, Anton Bruckner: Requiem, RIAS Kammerchor Berlin, Akademie für Alte Musik Berlin – CD: Accentus ACC30474, 2019 - adapted for SATB mixed choir, followed by Trösterin Musik

=== Trösterin Musik ===
The first recording of Trösterin Musik was by Willi Schell with the Cronenberger Männerchor in 1956 – 45 rpm: Tonstudio Wolfgang Jakob (Dortmund)

A selection of the about 30 other recordings:

- Jörg-Peter Weigle, Männerchor des Leipziger Rundfunkchores, In einem kühlen Grunde – LP: Eterna 7 35 209, 1984; reissued in CD: Delta 18 331 – a cappella
- Robert Shewan, Roberts Wesleyan College Chorale; Thaddeus James Stuart (organ), Choral Works of Anton Bruckner – CD: Albany TROY 063, 1991
- Michael Gläser, Chor des Bayerischen Rundfunks, Leise Töne der Brust – CD: Oehms Classics OC 589, 1993 – a cappella
- Martin L. Fiala, Männergesang-Verein Sängerlust, Festkonzert – CD: EE-004CD, 1994 – 1 strophe a cappella
- Guido Mancusi, Chorus Viennensis, Walter Lochmann (organ), Musik, du himmlisches Gebilde! – CD: ORF CD 73, 1995
- Thomas Kerbl, Männerchorvereinigung Bruckner 08, Philipp Sonntag (organ), Anton Bruckner – Männerchöre – CD: LIVA027, 2008 – 1 strophe

== Sources ==
- Anton Bruckner – Sämtliche Werke, Band XXIII/2: Weltliche Chorwerke (1843–1893), Musikwissenschaftlicher Verlag der Internationalen Bruckner-Gesellschaft, Angela Pachovsky and Anton Reinthaler (Editor), Vienna, 1989
- Cornelis van Zwol, Anton Bruckner 1824–1896 – Leven en werken, uitg. Thoth, Bussum, Netherlands, 2012. ISBN 978-90-6868-590-9
- Uwe Harten, Anton Bruckner. Ein Handbuch. Residenz Verlag, Salzburg, 1996. ISBN 3-7017-1030-9.
