= Sängerbund, WAB 82 =

Song composed by Anton Bruckner in 1882

Sängerbund
- Secular choral work by Anton Bruckner
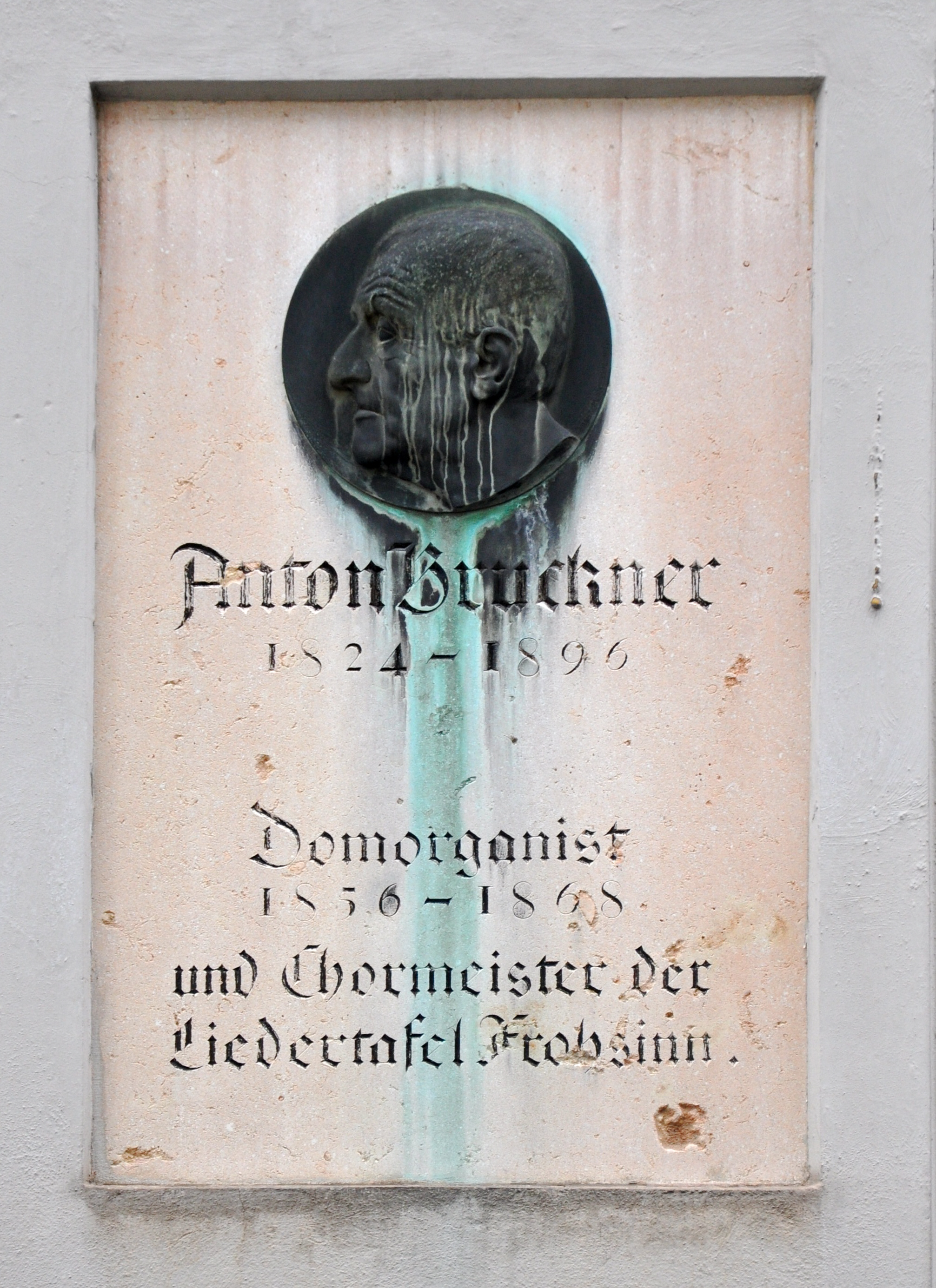
- Plaque to Anton Bruckner, Old Cathedral, Linz
- Key: C major
- Catalogue: WAB 82
- Form: Patriotic song
- Text: 1: Heinrich von der Mattig (?); 2: Karl Kerschbaum
- Language: German
- Composed: 3 February 1882: Vienna
- Dedication: August Göllerich
- Published: 1911: Vienna
- Vocal: TTBB choir

Sängerbund (Singers association), WAB 82, is an Austrian patriotic song in German, which Anton Bruckner composed in 1882.

== History ==
Bruckner composed the song on a text of an unknown author, possibly Heinrich von der Mattig, on 3 February 1882. He dedicated it to August Göllerich senior.

With Buckner's agreement, Karl Kerschbaum, the secretary of the Liedertafel Frohsinn, put another, more generalised text on the score to increase the chance of performances. The piece was first performed by Frohsinn in Wels during the fifth Oberösterreichisch-Salzburgisches Sängerbundfest (feast of the singers associations from Upper Austria and Salzburg) on 10 June 1883.

The song was a favourite of the Liedertafel Frohsinn, which performed it again in Passau in September 1890. As homage to their honorary chairman, Frohsinn performed the song on 4 September 1894 for celebrating Bruckner's 70th birthday.

The piece, of which the original manuscript is stored in the archive of the Liedertafel Frohsinn, was published first in 1911 by Viktor Keldorfer (Universal Edition) with Kerschbaum's text. It is issued with both texts in Band XXIII/2, No. 31 of the Gesamtausgabe.

== Lyrics ==
The original manuscript of Sängerbund was using lyrics of an unknown author, possibly Heinrich von der Mattig. The song was later edited with a revised lyrics by Karl Kerschbaum:

Nichts Schönres auf der ganzen Erde
Als froher Sang am Heimatherde
Lobpreisend deutsche Sitt' und Treu.
Es drängt hinaus von Kreis zu Kreise
Und es ertönt in Festes Weise
Das deutsche Lied so frisch und frei.

Ob unsre Brust erbebt vom Leide,
Ob unsern Sinn verklärt die Freude,
Wir halten fest am deutschen Liederband,
Und braust auch Sturmwind durch die Lande,
Das Lied tönt bis zum Grabesrande
Für Freiheit und fürs Vaterland.

Translation:

Nothing is more beautiful all over the world
Than a happy song on the native soil,
Praising the German virtue and loyalty.
It rushes out from circle to circle
And it rings out in festive tune:
The German song so fresh and free.

If our chest shudders of pain,
If our mind glorifies joy,
We hold firmly on to the German band of songs,
And even if storm rushes over the land,
The song will sound to edge of the grave
For freedom and the fatherland.

== Music ==
The 79-bar long work in C major is scored for TTBB choir.

The first strophe begins as a fanfare and evolves via a series of sixth chords to the ending tonic chord. The second strophe begins similarly and evolves from A major via a sixth chord of F minor to the same end as the first strophe.

== Discography ==
Sängerbund (with Karl Kerschbaum's text) was recorded three times by Attila Nagy with the Universitätssängerschaft 'Barden zu Wien' in 1996 (100th anniversary of Bruckner's death):

- on 18 May 1996: Anton Bruckner und seine Zeit – CD: disc-lazarus DL-USB 8B
- on 7 June 1996: Bruckner-Festabend anlässlich des 100. Todestages von Ehrenmitglied Anton Bruckner – CD: disc-lazarus DL-USB 8C
- on 26 October 1996: Konzert im Brucknerjahr – CD: disc-lazarus DL-USB 8D

== Sources ==
- Anton Bruckner – Sämtliche Werke, Band XXIII/2: Weltliche Chorwerke (1843–1893), Musikwissenschaftlicher Verlag der Internationalen Bruckner-Gesellschaft, Angela Pachovsky and Anton Reinthaler (Editor), Vienna, 1989
- Cornelis van Zwol, Anton Bruckner 1824–1896 – Leven en werken, uitg. Thoth, Bussum, Netherlands, 2012. ISBN 978-90-6868-590-9
- Uwe Harten, Anton Bruckner. Ein Handbuch. Residenz Verlag, Salzburg, 1996. ISBN 3-7017-1030-9.
