= Herbstlied, WAB 73 =

1864 song composed by Anton Bruckner

Herbstlied
- Secular choral work by Anton Bruckner
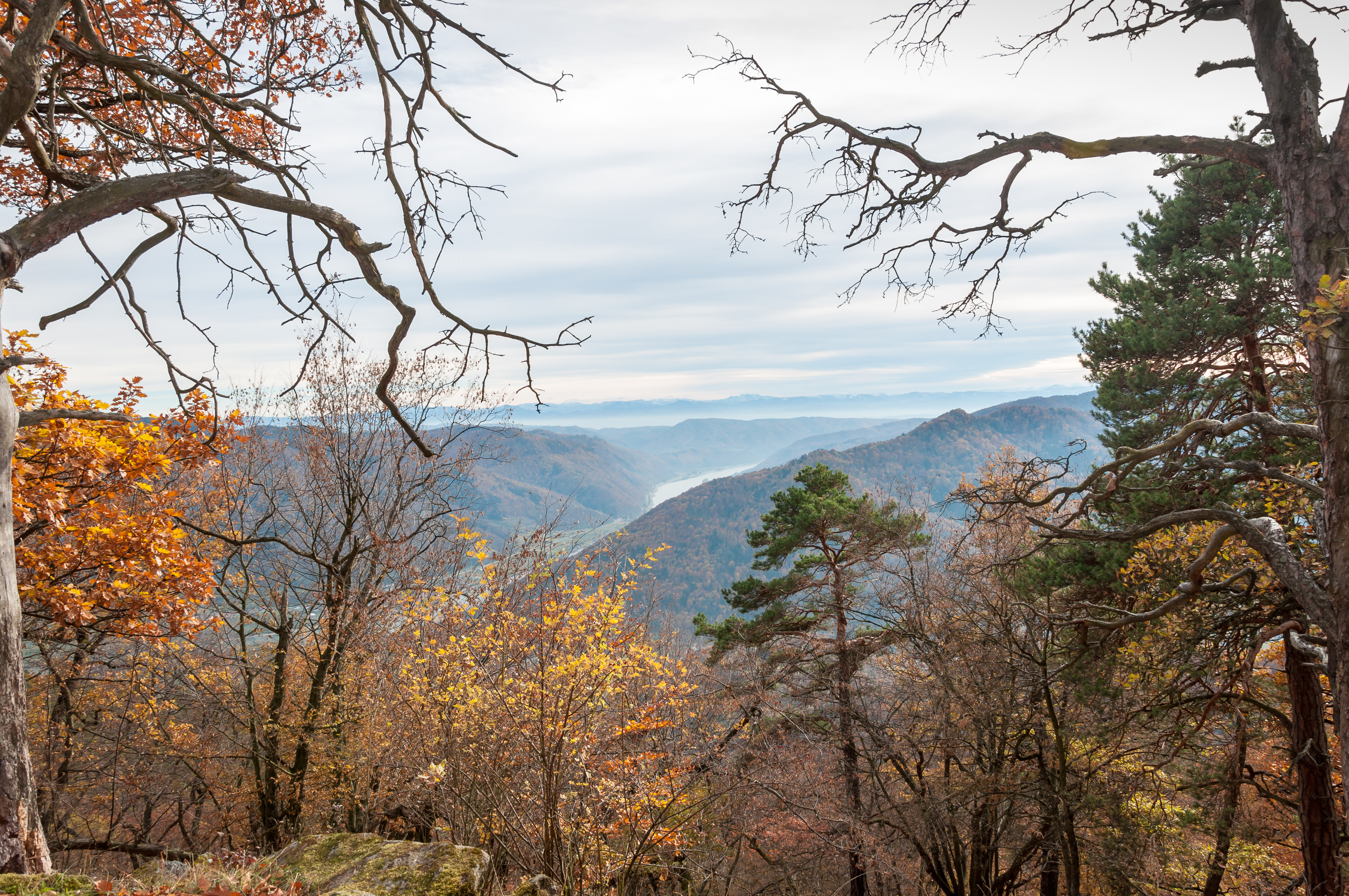
- Buchberg, Lower Austria in autumn
- Key: F♯ minor
- Catalogue: WAB 73
- Text: Friedrich von Sallet
- Language: German
- Composed: 19 March 1864: Linz
- Dedication: Josef Hafferl
- Published: 1911: Vienna
- Vocal: TTBB choir, 2 soprano soloists
- Instrumental: Piano

Herbstlied (Autumn song), WAB 73, is a romantic song composed by Anton Bruckner in 1864. The song, scored for men's choir and two soprano soloists with piano accompaniment, depicts an autumn walking with nightingale song.

== History ==
Bruckner composed the song on a text of Friedrich von Sallet on 19 March 1864.

Bruckner dedicated the song to his friend Josef Hafferl, chairman of the Liedertafel Frohsinn. The piece was performed on 24 November 1864 in the Redoutensaal of Linz by Frohsinn under Bruckner's baton, with Marie Schimatschek and Anna Bergmann as soloists.

A copy of the work, of which the original manuscript is lost, is stored in the archive of the Liedertafel Frohsinn. The piece, which was first issued by Viktor Keldorfer (Universal Edition) in 1911, is issued in Band XXIII/2, No. 16 of the Gesamtausgabe.

== Text ==
Herbstlied is using a text by Friedrich von Sallet.

Durch die Wälder streif’ ich munter,
Wenn der Wind die Stämme rüttelt
Und mit Rasseln bunt und bunter
Blatt auf Blatt herunterschüttelt.

Denn es träumt bei solchem Klange
Sich gar schön vom Frühlingshauche,
Von der Nachtigall Gesange
Und vom jungen Grün am Strauche.

Lustig schreit’ ich durchs Gefilde,
Wo verdorrte Disteln nicken,
Denk’ an Maienröslein milde
Mit den morgenfrischen Blicken.

Nach dem Himmel schau’ ich gerne,
Wenn ihn Wolken schwarz bedecken,
Denk’ an tausend liebe Sterne,
Die dahinter sich verstecken.

I walk cheerfully through the forests,
When the wind shakes the trunks,
And rattling shakes down
More colourful leaves.

Because in such sound one dreams
Pleasantly of a hint of spring,
Of the song of nightingale
and of young green on the bush.

I walk cheerfully through the fields,
Where withered thistles nod,
And think of the gentle may rose
With morning's fresh eyes.

I like to look to the sky
When black clouds cover it,
Think of thousand lovely stars,
Which are hidden behind.

== Music ==
The 69-bar long work in F♯ minor is scored for TTBB choir, two soprano soloists and piano. Strophe 1 is sung by the men's choir. Strophe 2 (from bar 17) is sung by the two soprano soloists, who are figuring the song of the nightingales, with accompaniment of the men's choir. Strophe 3 is sung again by the men's choir. Strophe 4, which is sung again by the two soprano soloists with accompaniment of the men's choir, is ending pianissimo.

In the Göllerich/Auer biography, the song is described as ein treffliches Stimmungsbild herbstlicher Naturromantik (a felicitous evocation of autumnal nature-romanticism).

== Discography ==
The first recording of Herbstlied was by Theodor Rehmann with the Aachener Domchor in 1938 – 78 rpm: Electrola EG 6530 (transcription for choir)

There are two other recordings:

- Thomas Kerbl, Quartet of the Männerchorvereinigung Bruckner 08, Regina Riel & Katharina Lyashenko (soprano soloists), Mariko Onishi (piano), Anton Bruckner – Männerchöre – CD: LIVA027, 2008 (men's choir replaced by a men's vocal quartet)
- Markus Stumpner, Erinnerung - Bruckner in St. Florian, Sankt Florianer Sängerknaben – CD : Solo Musica SM 450, 2024

== Sources ==
- August Göllerich, Anton Bruckner. Ein Lebens- und Schaffens-Bild, c. 1922 – posthumous edited by Max Auer by G. Bosse, Regensburg, 1932
- Anton Bruckner – Sämtliche Werke, Band XXIII/2: Weltliche Chorwerke (1843–1893), Musikwissenschaftlicher Verlag der Internationalen Bruckner-Gesellschaft, Angela Pachovsky and Anton Reinthaler (Editor), Vienna, 1989
- Cornelis van Zwol, Anton Bruckner 1824–1896 – Leven en werken, uitg. Thoth, Bussum, Netherlands, 2012. ISBN 978-90-6868-590-9
- Uwe Harten, Anton Bruckner. Ein Handbuch. Residenz Verlag, Salzburg, 1996. ISBN 3-7017-1030-9.
- Crawford Howie, Anton Bruckner - A documentary biography, online revised edition
