= HMM =

HMM or hmm may refer to:

== Arts and entertainment ==
- Hail Mary Mallon, an American hip-hop group
- Hallmark Movies & Mysteries, a U.S. cable channel
- Heavy metal music, a subgenre of rock music
- Heroes of Might and Magic, a video game series (also abbreviated as HoMM)
- High-end Master Model, a high-quality Zoids model kit

== Organizations ==
- HMM (company), a South Korean container transportation and shipping company
- Hatch Mott MacDonald, a North American engineering consulting firm
- Homenmen, an Armenian sporting organization

== Science and technology ==
- Heavy meromyosin, a protein fragment
- Heterogeneous memory management, in the Linux kernel
- Hidden Markov model, a statistical model

== Other uses ==
- Central Mashan Miao language (ISO 639-3 code), spoken in China
- Hammerton railway station (National Rail code), England, National Rail

== See also ==
- Hum (sound), a wordless vocalization
- An interjection or filler (linguistics)
- Homenmen (disambiguation)
