= Laßt Jubeltöne laut erklingen =

- Secular choral work by Anton Bruckner
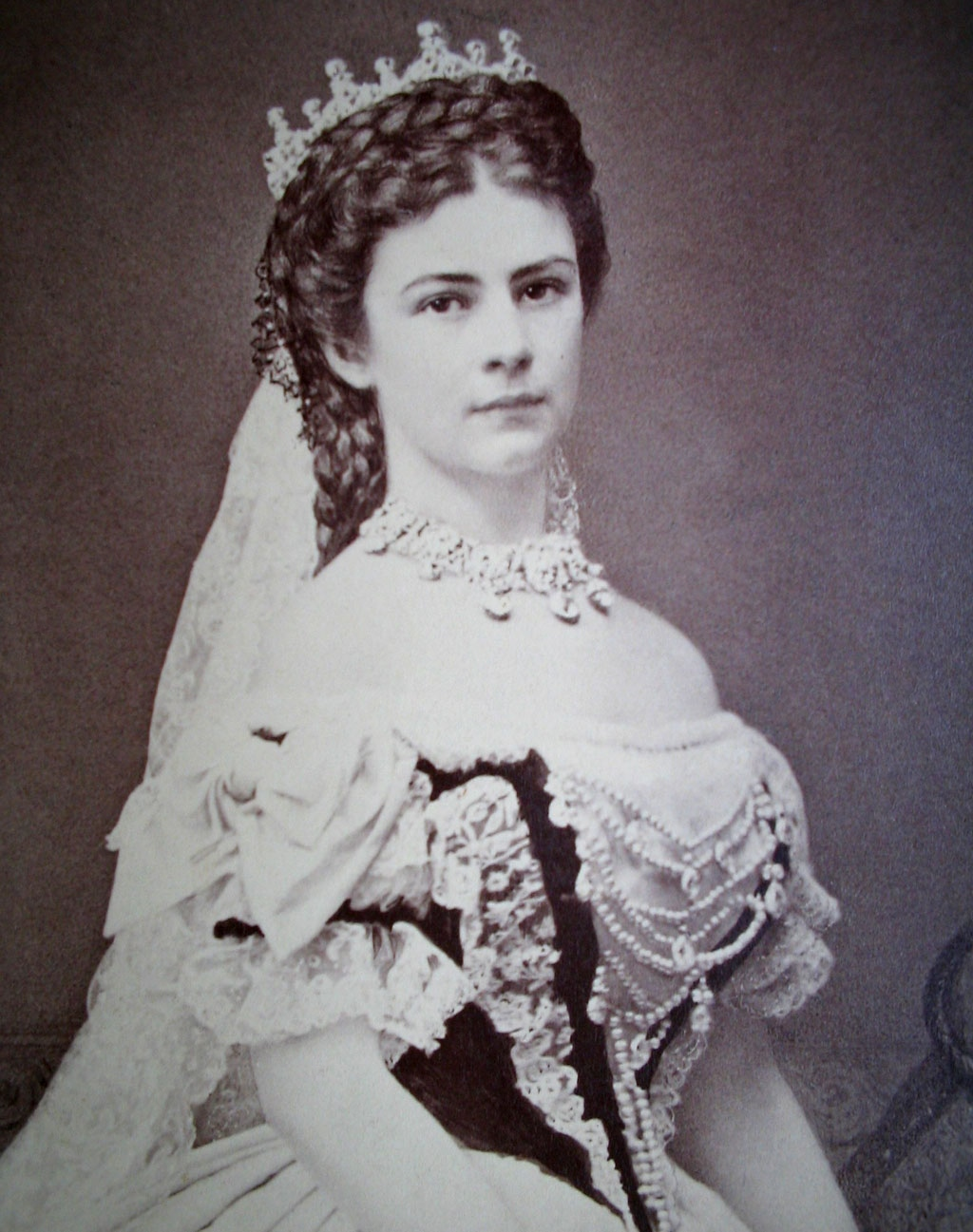
- Elisabeth of Bavaria
- Key: E♭ major
- Catalogue: WAB 76
- Form: Festive hymn
- Text: Hillischer
- Language: German
- Composed: 1854: St. Florian
- Dedication: Joyous Entry of princess Elisabeth in Linz
- Published: 1932: Regensburg
- Vocal: TTBB choir
- Instrumental: Brass instruments

Laßt Jubeltöne laut erklingen (Let exultation sound loudly), WAB 76, is a festive song composed by Anton Bruckner in 1854.

== History ==
Bruckner composed this "cantata" on a text of Hillischer in 1854.

The piece was intended to be sung by the Liedertafel Frohsinn for the Joyous Entry of Elisabeth of Bavaria, then the bride of Franz Joseph of Austria, known as Sisi, in Linz on 22 April 1854. However, Bruckner's composition was not performed, but instead a transcription of the Bavarian national hymn with the same text by Hillischer.

Another text by Anton August Naaf, "Dir, holde Heimat, soll erklingen der höchsten Liebe treues Lied" (To you, lovely homeland, should sound the faithful song of highest love), was used for the music for a performance of the Wiener Schubertbund on 15 June 1898.

Later again, another text was put by Anton Weiss for the Wiener Schubertbund. Bruckner's autograph manuscript is stored in the archive of the Oberösterreichisches Landesarchiv.

A facsimile of the work with Naaf's text was first published in band III/2, pp. 162–179 of the Göllerich/Auer biography, with Hillischer's original text in footnote. The work is put with the original text only in XXIII/2, No. 10 of the Gesamtausgabe.

== Text ==
The text used for the cantata is by Hillischer:

Laßt Jubeltöne laut erklingen
Aus treuer, biedrer Männerbrust,
Singt Töne, die zum Himmel dringen,
Mit heilig frommer Sängerlust.

Und freut euch, freundlich zog ja wieder
Bei all den treuen Bürgern sein
Zu seinem Volk so echt und bieder
Des schönen Öst'reichs Herrscher ein.

O jubelt freundlich ihm entgegen,
All Glück liegt ja in seiner Hand,
Von ihm allein strömt aller Segen
Wohltuend auf das Vaterland.

Wie unsre Berge fest und kühn,
wie unsre Luft so frisch und rein
Soll unser wahrer, edler Sinn,
Soll unsre Treu zum Kaiser sein.

Gott schütze Öst'reichs Doppelaar,
Erhöre unser fromm Gebet,
Schütz' unser edles Herrscherpaar
Franz Josef und Elisabeth.

Let exultation sound loudly,
From faithful and worthy men's chests.
Sing sounds which rise to heaven,
Sung with devoted holy joy,

And rejoice, because he returned friendly
To all his faithful citizens,
To his people so true and worthy,
Beautiful Austria's ruler.

O rejoice friendly towards him,
All fortune lies in his hand,
From him alone streams all blessing
Beneficially on the country.

Like our mountains firm and daring,
Like our air, so fresh and pure,
Should our true and noble mind,
Should our faith be for the emperor.

May God protect the two-headed Austrian eagle,
Hear our devoted prayer,
Protect our noble imperial couple
Franz Josef and Elisabeth.

== Music ==
The 100-bar long work in E♭ major is scored for TTBB choir and brass instruments (2 horns, 2 trumpets and 4 trombones).

The work consists of two related sections and a coda. While the horns and the trumpets are used only to contribute brief fanfare, pedal tones, and occasionally to the roots of otherwise incomplete chords, the four trombones almost always double the voices. Like other Bruckner's works, the work begins with a distinctive motive that provides much of the ensuing musical material. Obvious derivatives of this motive form the beginning and the ending of each section, and all of the imitative passages are based on developments of it. Since no two statements of this tune are identical, it provides both musical unity and variety. The music is of substantial interest, because it contains an attractive blend of progressive and textural variety.

== Discography ==
There is a single recording of Laßt Jubeltöne laut erklingen:

- Thomas Kerbl, Men choir and brass instrument ensemble of the Anton Bruckner Privatuniversität Linz, Weltliche Männerchöre – CD: LIVA 054, 2012

== Sources ==
- August Göllerich, Anton Bruckner. Ein Lebens- und Schaffens-Bild, c. 1922 – posthumous edited by Max Auer by G. Bosse, Regensburg, 1932
- Anton Bruckner – Sämtliche Werke, Band XXIII/2: Weltliche Chorwerke (1843–1893), Musikwissenschaftlicher Verlag der Internationalen Bruckner-Gesellschaft, Angela Pachovsky and Anton Reinthaler (Editor), Vienna, 1989
- Keith William Kinder, The Wind and Wind-Chorus Music of Anton Bruckner, Greenwood Press, Westport, Connecticut, 2000
- Cornelis van Zwol, Anton Bruckner 1824–1896 – Leven en werken, uitg. Thoth, Bussum, Netherlands, 2012. ISBN 978-90-6868-590-9
- Crawford Howie, Anton Bruckner - A documentary biography, online revised edition
