= Hans Schläger =

Austrian conductor and composer (1820 - 1885)

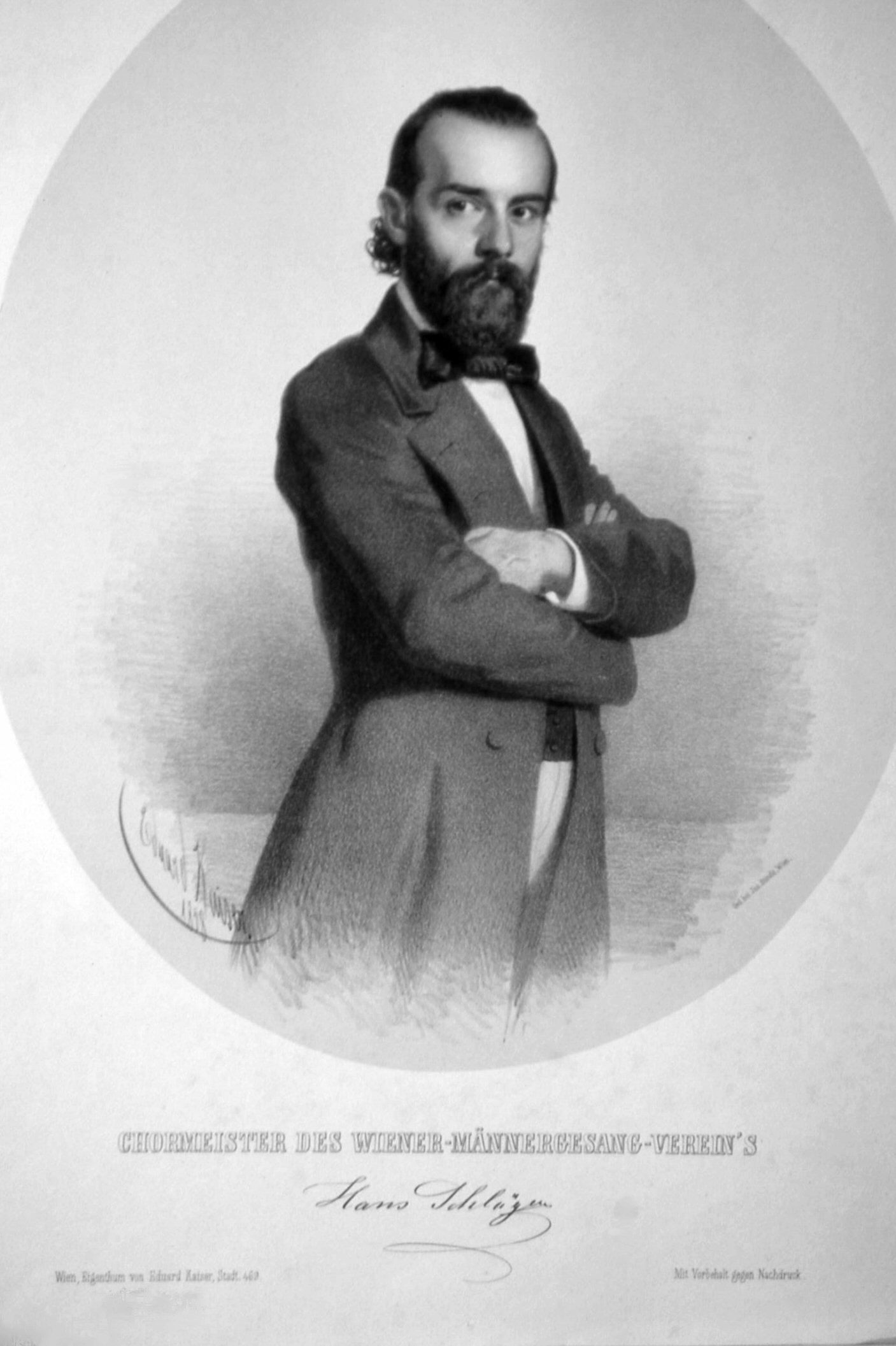
Lithograph by Eduard Kaiser (1858)

Hans (Johann) Schläger (5 December 1820 – 17 May 1885) was an Austrian conductor and composer, important in the musical life of Salzburg in the 1860s. He was particularly involved in choral music.

== Life ==
Schläger was born in Feldkirchen an der Donau, Upper Austria, in 1810. His father Johann Schläger, a teacher, gave him early music lessons, and he was a choirboy at St. Florian Monastery, where he received violin lessons. In Linz he trained from 1836 to 1838 to be a teacher; he became an assistant teacher in Regau, and afterwards in Sankt Florian, where he was the predecessor of Anton Bruckner. (Bruckner dedicated his early choral work Das Lied vom deutschen Vaterland, written in 1845, to Schläger).

From 1845 to 1847 he studied composition under Gottfried von Preyer at Vienna Conservatory, and later studied singing at the Akademie der Tonkunst in Vienna. From 1854 to 1861 he was director of the Wiener Männergesang-Verein ("Vienna Men's Choral Society"); as its director he won a prize at the Singing Festival in Nuremberg in 1861.

=== In Salzburg ===
Schläger moved to Salzburg, where from 1861 to 1868 he was Kapellmeister of the Dom-Musik-Verein und Mozarteum; from 1862 he was also director of the Salzburger Liedertafel. He was important in the musical life of Salzburg at this period, bringing notable choral works to the city for the first time, including Haydn's The Creation, Schumann's Paradise and the Peri and Mendelssohn's St. Paul.

In 1868 he married Countess Pauline von Oldershausen (born Countess von Zichy-Vásonykeő).

He resigned from his offices and devoted himself to composition. He was adviser to the publisher Breitkopf & Härtel on their complete edition of Mozart (now known as the Alte Mozart-Ausgabe).

Schläger died in Salzburg in 1885.

== Compositions ==
Compositions, some of which were printed, include operas (Hans Haidekukuk, Die Prophezeiung and Doctor und Friseur), songs, choral works, 2 symphonies and 3 string quartets. His biographer in Biographisches Lexikon des Kaiserthums Oesterreich (1875) wrote: "Music critics praise in Schläger's compositions originality of invention, stylish portrayal of characters and action, and colourful instrumentation."
