= Homenmen (disambiguation) =

Homenmen (Armenian: Հ.Մ.Մ., romanized: H.M.M., pronounced [ˈhɔmɛnmɛn]) is a pan-Armenian sports and scouting organization.

Homenmen may also refer to:

- Homenmen Beirut, a multi-sports club based in Beirut, Lebanon
- Erebuni-Homenmen FC, formerly Homenmen-FIMA FC, a football club based in Yerevan, Armenia

== See also ==
- HMM (disambiguation)
- Homenetmen (disambiguation)
