= Homenetmen Beirut =

Homenetmen Beirut may refer to:

- Homenetmen Beirut (basketball), a Lebanese basketball club
- Homenetmen Beirut (football), a Lebanese football club

== See also ==
- Homenetmen (disambiguation)
