= Homenetmen (disambiguation) =

Homenetmen (Armenian: Հ.Մ.Ը.Մ., romanized: H.M.Ə.M, pronounced [ˈhɔmɛnetmɛn]) is a pan-Armenian sports and scouting organization.

Homenetmen may also refer to:

- Homenetmen Lebanon, a multi-sports club based in Lebanon
  - Homenetmen Antelias
  - Homenetmen Beirut
    - Homenetmen Beirut (football)
    - Homenetmen Beirut (basketball)
  - Homenetmen Bourj Hammoud
- Al-Yarmouk SC, formerly Homenetmen Aleppo, a sports club based in Aleppo, Syria
  - Al-Yarmouk SC (football)
  - Al-Yarmouk SC (men's basketball)
  - Al-Yarmouk SC (women's basketball)
- FC Pyunik, formerly Homenetmen Yerevan, a sports club based in Yerevan, Armenia
- Kilikia FC, formerly Homenetmen AOSS Yerevan, a football club based in Yerevan, Armenia

== See also ==
- Homenmen (disambiguation)
