= Vor Arneths Grab, WAB 53 =

Anton Bruckner's composition

Vor Arneths Grab
- Secular choral work by Anton Bruckner
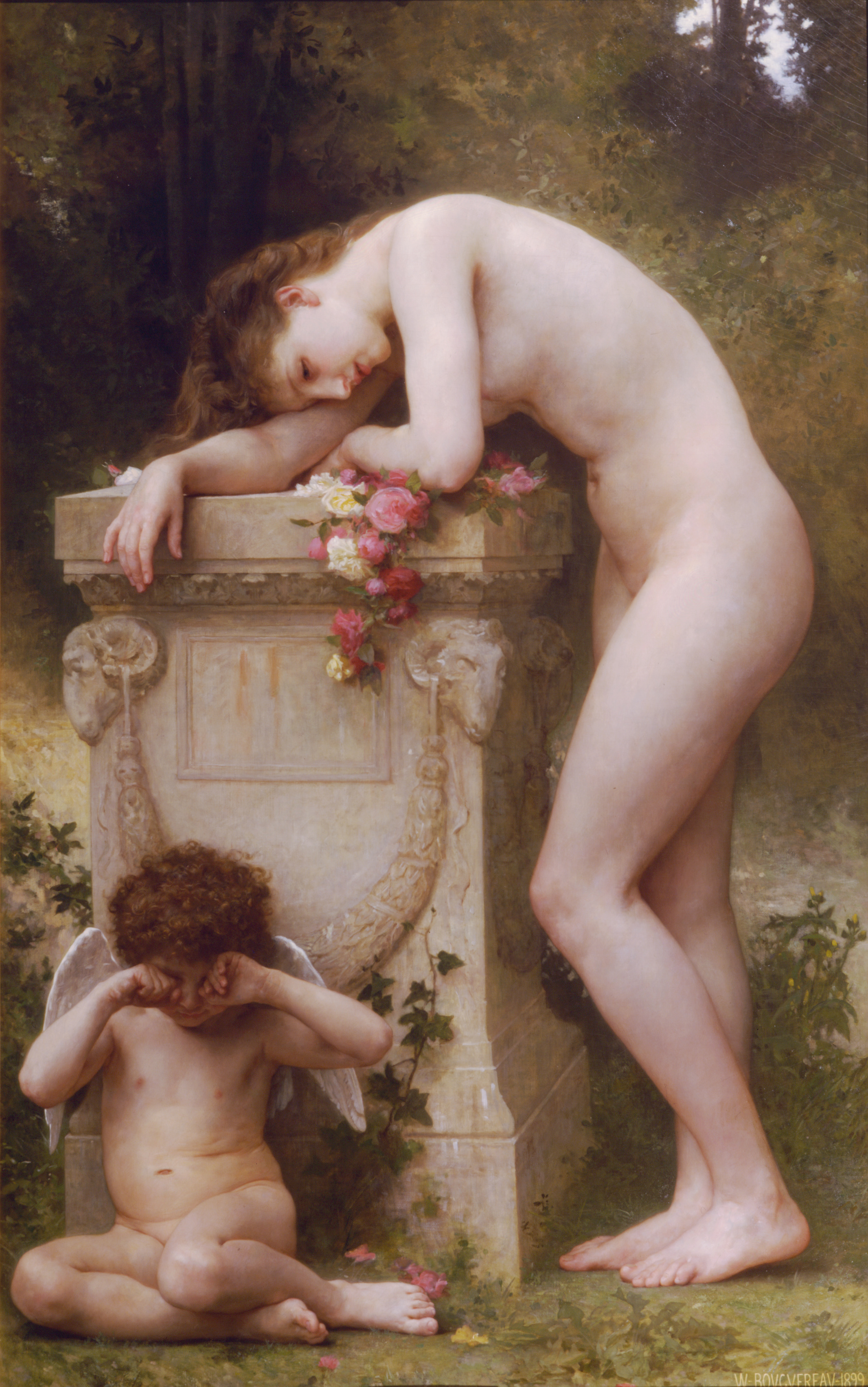
- Elegy by William-Adolphe Bouguereau
- Key: F minor
- Catalogue: WAB 53
- Form: Elegy
- Language: German
- Composed: 1854: St. Florian
- Dedication: Funeral of Prior Michael Arneth
- Published: 1932: Regensburg
- Vocal: TTBB choir
- Instrumental: 3 trombones

Vor Arneths Grab (Facing Arneth's tomb), WAB 53, is an elegy composed by Anton Bruckner in 1854, for men's voices and three trombones.

== History ==
Bruckner composed the elegy Vor Arneths Grab, WAB 53, for the funeral of Michael Arneth, the prior of the St. Florian Abbey. The work, which was written together with the Libera me, WAB 22, was performed on 28 March 1854 at the cemetery of the abbey.

The elegy was performed a second time for the funeral of Magistrate Wilhelm Schiedermayr on 23 September 1855.

The original manuscript of the elegy is stored in the archive of Wels. The work, which was first published in band II/2, pp. 184–188 of the Göllerich/Auer biography, is put in Band XXIII/2, No. 9 of the Gesamtausgabe.

Am Grabe is a revised a cappella setting of the elegy, was performed on the funeral of Josephine Hafferl.

== Text ==
The elegy uses a text by Ernst von Marinelli.

Brüder, trocknet eure Zähren,
stillt der Schmerzen herbes Leid,
Liebe kann sich auch bewähren
durch Ergebungsinnigkeit.

Wohl ist dies das letzte Schauen
auf die Leiche und den Sarg,
doch die Seele, die sie barg,
triumphiert durch Gottvertrau’n.

Drum lasst uns den Herren preisen,
der die Edelsten erwählt
und für uns, die armen Waisen,
auch den Himmel offen hält!

Wollen hier am Grab geloben
Treue, Recht und frommen Sinn,
dass der Selige dort oben,
hat sich unser Geist erhoben,
uns zum Vater führe hin.

Brothers, dry your tears,
Still the hard pain of your sorrow,
Love can also show
In the intimacy of resignation.

While this is the last look
On the corps and the coffin,
The soul which they contained,
triumphs by trust in God.

Therefore, let us praise the Lord,
Who elects the most noble
And for us, the poor orphans,
also holds the Heaven open!

We want to promise at the tomb
Trust, justice and pious devotion,
That the blessed one above,
Once our spirit will have risen,
Will lead us to the Father.

== Music ==
The 28-bar-long work in F minor is scored for TTTB choir and 3 trombones. The setting of the first two strophes (bars 1 to 8) is identical. It is followed (bars 9 to 16) by the setting of the third strophe, and, after two instrumental bars, ends (bars 19 to 28) with the setting of the last strophe.

Although it is a funeral song, it displays little of the mournful character one might expect. The text and the music, with largely diatonic harmony and a predominance of major sonorities, focus instead on confidence about resurrection and salvation. Like the concomitant Libera me, the work contains portents of Bruckner's mature style and has thus a significant place in Bruckner's musical development.

== Discography ==
There are three recordings of Vor Arneths Grab:

- Jürgen Jürgens, Monteverdi-Chor, Bruckner - Music of St Florian Period (II) – CD: BSVD-0111 (Bruckner Archive), 1985
- Thomas Kerbl, Chorvereinigung Bruckner 08, Anton Bruckner Männerchöre – CD: LIVA 027, 2008
- Łukasz Borowicz, Anton Bruckner: Requiem, RIAS Kammerchor Berlin, Akademie für Alte Musik Berlin – CD: Accentus ACC30474, 2019

== Sources ==
- August Göllerich, Anton Bruckner. Ein Lebens- und Schaffens-Bild, c. 1922 – posthumous edited by Max Auer by G. Bosse, Regensburg, 1932
- Keith William Kinder, The Wind and Wind-Chorus Music of Anton Bruckner, Greenwood Press, Westport, Connecticut, 2000
- Anton Bruckner – Sämtliche Werke, Band XXIII/2: Weltliche Chorwerke (1843–1893), Musikwissenschaftlicher Verlag der Internationalen Bruckner-Gesellschaft, Angela Pachovsky and Anton Reinthaler (Editor), Vienna, 1989
- Cornelis van Zwol, Anton Bruckner 1824–1896 – Leven en werken, uitg. Thoth, Bussum, Netherlands, 2012. ISBN 978-90-6868-590-9
- Crawford Howie, Anton Bruckner - A documentary biography, online revised edition
