= Carl Debrois van Bruyck =

Austrian pianist, composer and music writer

Carl Debrois van Bruyck (14 March 1828 – 15 August 1902) was an Austrian pianist, composer and music writer.

== Life ==
Born in Brno, Moravia, Debrois van Bruyck is primarily known as a special admirer of the composer Robert Schumann. Among other things he set to music poems by his friend Friedrich Hebbel. Debrois van Bruyck presented his autobiography. His written remains can be found in the music and manuscript collection of the Wienbibliothek im Rathaus.

Debrois van Bruyck died in Waidhofen an der Ybbs, Lower Austria at age 74.

== Work ==
- Technische und ästhetische Analysen des Das Wohltemperierte Klavier, nebst einer allgemeinen, Sebastian Bach und die sogenannte kontrapunktische Kunst betreffende Einleitung. Breitkopf & Härtel, 3rd edition, Leipzig 1925.
