= Franz Isidor Proschko =

Austrian writer

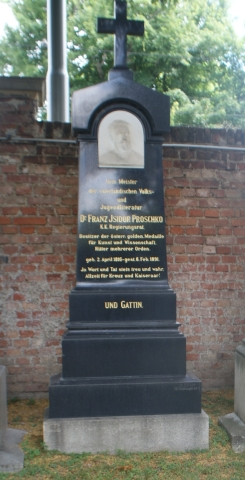
Grave of Franz Isidor Proschko at the Vienna Central Cemetery

Franz Isidor Proschko, pseudonym Franz von Hohenfurth (2 April 1816 in Hohenfurth, Bohemia – 6 February 1891 in Vienna), was an Austrian author.

== Early life ==
From 1828 Proschko attended the high school in České Budějovice and then studied Civil and Criminal Law at the University in Prague. After he finished studies at the University of Vienna with a legal dissertation was finished, he took a job as a trainee at police headquarters in Linz.

Proschko was a police officer and after a stop in Graz, he was transferred to Vienna in 1867 one was awarded the title Police Council awarded in 1883, he went on board. At the age of 75 years of age Franz Isidor Proschko died on 6 February 1891 in Vienna. His final resting place he found in a grave of honor (German: Ehrengrab) in the Vienna Central Cemetery between the composer Josef Mayseder and Johannes Baptist Moser.
