= Chorus Viennensis =

Chorus Viennensis is a men's choir composed of former members of the Vienna Boys Choir. It was founded in 1952. The choir has won the Grand Prix du Disque, the Mozart Interpretation Prize and the Schubert Interpretation prize.
