= Humming =

Wordless tone with closed mouth

A man producing a long monotone hum

A woman humming a tune

A hum (/hʌm/) is a sound made by producing a wordless tone with the mouth closed, forcing the sound to emerge from the nose. To hum is to produce such a sound, often with a melody. It is also associated with thoughtful absorption, 'hmm'.

A hum has a particular timbre (or sound quality), usually a monotone or with slightly varying tones. There are other similar sounds not produced by human singing that are also called hums, as the sound produced by machinery in operation, such as a microwave, or by an insect in flight. The hummingbird was named for the sound that bird makes in flight which sounds like a hum.

== Mechanics ==
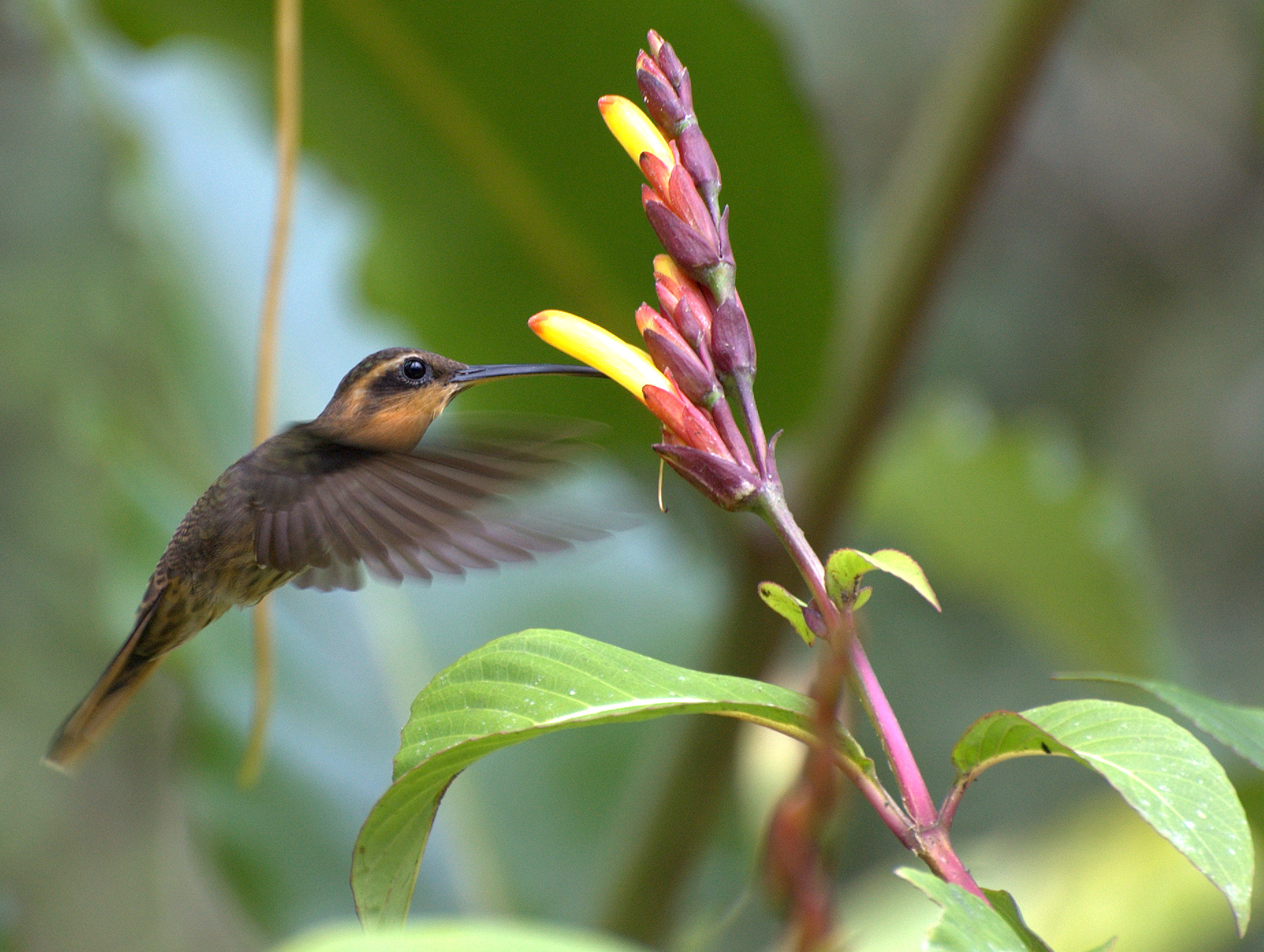
A hummingbird with flower

A 'hum' or 'humming' by humans is created by the resonance of air in various parts of passages in the head and throat, in the act of breathing. The 'hum' that a hummingbird creates is also created by resonance: in this case by air resistance against wings in the actions of flying, especially of hovering.

== Humming in human evolution ==
Joseph Jordania suggested that humming could have played an important role in the early human (hominid) evolution as contact calls. Many social animals produce seemingly haphazard and indistinct sounds (like chicken cluck) when they are going about their everyday business (foraging, feeding). These sounds let group members know that they are among kin and there is no danger. In the case of the appearance of any signs of danger (such as suspicious sounds or movements in a forest), the animal that notices danger first, stops moving, stops producing sounds, remains silent and looks in the direction of the danger sign. Other animals quickly follow suit and very soon all the group is silent and is scanning the environment for possible danger.

Charles Darwin was the first to notice this phenomenon on the example of the wild horses and the cattle. Joseph Jordania suggested that for humans, as for many social animals, silence can be a sign of danger, and that's why gentle humming and musical sounds relax humans (see the use of gentle music in music therapy, lullabies).

== Humming in language ==
In Pirahã, the only surviving dialect of the Mura language, there is a special register of speech which uses solely humming, with no audible release.

== Music ==
Humming is often used in music of genres, from classical (for example, the famous chorus at the end of Act 2 of Giacomo Puccini's Madama Butterfly or the aria of Heitor Villa-Lobos's Bachianas Brasileiras No. 5) to jazz to R&B.

Another form of music derived from basic humming is the humwhistle. Folk art, also known as "whistle-hum," produces a high pitch and low pitch simultaneously. The two-tone sound is related to field holler, overtone singing, and yodeling the music.

== See also ==
- Kazoo
- The Hum – an apparently widespread phenomenon involving a low-frequency hum of unknown origin, inaudible to most people
- Mains hum – an electric or electromagnetic phenomenon that causes a low frequency (50 or 60 Hz) audible signal
