= Uwe Harten =

German musicologist (born 1944)

Uwe Harten (born 16 August 1944) is a German musicologist, who works in Austria.

== Life ==
Born in Ehrhorn, Harten grew up in Hamburg, where he was a boy soprano at the Staatsoper. He took over the roles of a child. In Hamburg he also began his studies of musicology and art history, which he continued in Vienna with Erich Schenk. He gained his doctorate with his study of the Viennese Schumann admirer Carl Debrois van Bruyck.

He then worked as a dramaturgical assistant at the Vienna Chamber Opera. Furthermore, he assisted Anthony van Hoboken in the production of his Werkverzeichnis of Joseph Haydn.

Since 1972 he has been a member of the Kommission für Musikforschung at the Österreichische Akademie der Wissenschaften. Since 1974 he has been secretary and member of the board of directors of the Denkmäler der Tonkunst in Österreich.

In addition Harten worked as an assistant at the Anton Bruckner Institut Linz since its foundation in 1978. From 1988 to 2000 he was also its deputy scientific director and participated between 1977 and 2000 in the organization of the Bruckner symposiums in Linz. Harten is also President of the Hans Rott Society.

Harten has been living in Vienna since 1964 and is married to the musicologist Christa Harten, née Flamm.

== Publications ==
- (as project manager and publisher): Anton Bruckner. Ein Handbuch. Residenz Verlag, Salzburg-Wien 1996, ISBN 3-7017-1030-9.
- (as edit.): Hans Rott (1858–1884). Biographie, Briefe, Aufzeichnungen und Dokumente aus dem Nachlaß von Maja Loehr (1888–1964). Österreichische Akademie der Wissenschaften, Wien 2000, ISBN 3-7001-2943-2.
- Max Kalbeck zum 150. Geburtstag: Skizzen einer Persönlichkeit. Hans Schneider, Tutzing 2007, ISBN 3-7952-1236-7.
- with Johannes Volker Schmidt (as edit.): "Die Sache, für die mein Leben einsteht". Studien zu Leben und Werk des Wiener Komponisten Hans Rott. Olms Verlag, Hildesheim 2014, ISBN 978-3-487-15160-1.
