= August Göllerich =

Austrian pianist and conductor

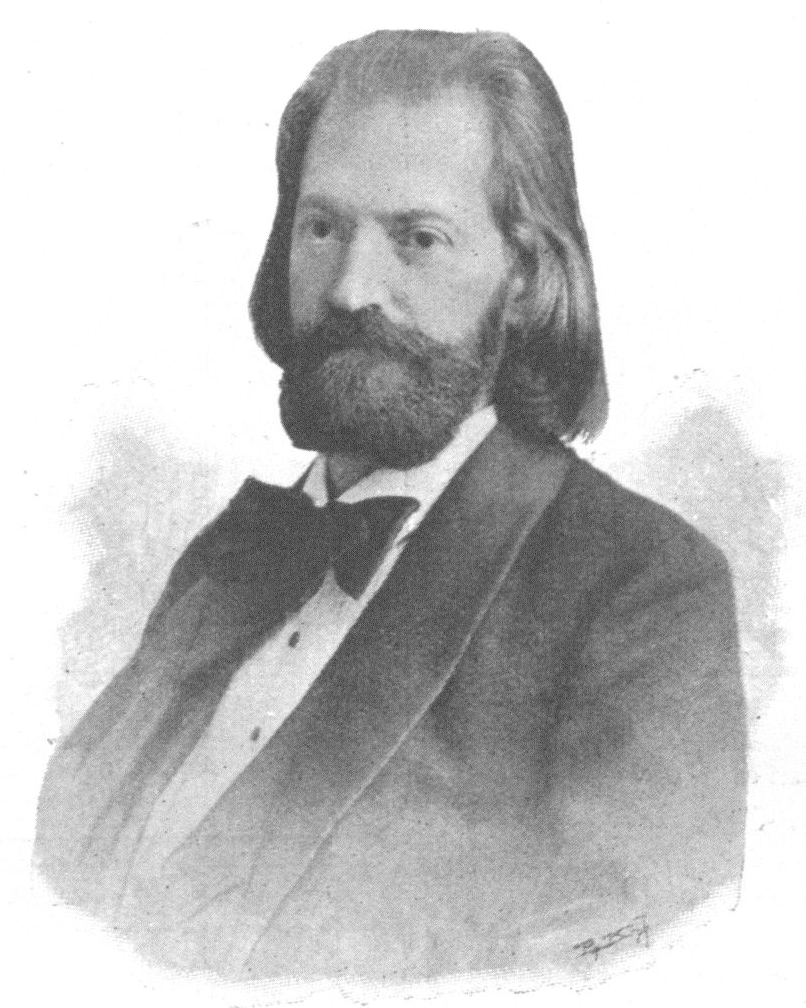
- August Göllerich in 1900
- Born: 2 July 1859; Linz
- Died: 16 March 1923 (aged 63); Linz
- Education: University of Vienna
- Occupations: Pianist; Conductor; Music educator; Biographer
- Organizations: Linz Musikverein

August Göllerich (2 July 1859 – 16 March 1923) was an Austrian pianist, conductor, music educator and music writer. He studied the piano with Franz Liszt, who made him also his secretary and companion on concert tours. Göllerich is known for studying the life and work of Anton Bruckner whose secretary and friend he was. He initiated and conducted concerts of Bruckner's music in Linz, and wrote an influential biography.

== Life ==
Born in Linz, the son of the Wels town secretary and later member of the Reich Council and State Parliament August Göllerich and his wife Maria, née Nowotny, Göllerich grew up in middle-class circumstances. His father was a member of a liberal writers and literary association in Wels. Göllerich attended the Linz Realschule, which he completed with the Matura.

He studied mathematics at the University of Vienna, as his father wished. In 1882, he attended the Bayreuth Festival. After his father's death in 1883, he devoted himself entirely to music, studying in Vienna the piano with Toni Raab, and composition with Anton Bruckner. Raab introduced him to Franz Liszt in 1884, who accepted him as a piano student. He recognized Göllerich's literary and pianistic talent, and made him his secretary and travel companion, on concert tours to Germany, Italy and Russia. After Liszt's death in 1886, he worked as a music critic in Vienna.

Göllerich became a secretary of Anton Bruckner. From 1890 until 1896, he was director of the Ramann-Volckmann'sche Musikschule, a music school in Nuremberg, together with his wife Gisela Pászthory-Voigt, also a pianist and student of Liszt. One of her children from an earlier marriage was Casimir von Pászthory.

From 1896 until his death in 1923, Göllerich was director of the Linz Musikverein, which made him also the artistic director of the Musikverein concerts and choir master of the Schubertbund choir. He conducted the world premieres of many important works by Liszt and Bruckner in a series calles Bruckner Festkonzerte, making Linz a leading place for music. Authorized by Bruckner, he wrote a biography of the composer, covering not only his life but also a thorough analysis of his compositions. His work remained an influential biography of the composer, including views regarded later as problematic, such as "Musikant Gottes" (God's musician).

Göllerich died in Linz. The Anton Bruckner Private University holds his diaries, in which his memories of Liszt are recorded, and other materials, which are now in the Austrian National Library in Vienna.

== Publications ==
- Franz Liszt Berlin 1908
- Anton Bruckner. Ein Lebens- und Schaffensbild. 1936
- The piano master classes of Franz Liszt, 1884-1886 : diary notes of August Göllerich.
