= List of cantatas by Anton Bruckner =

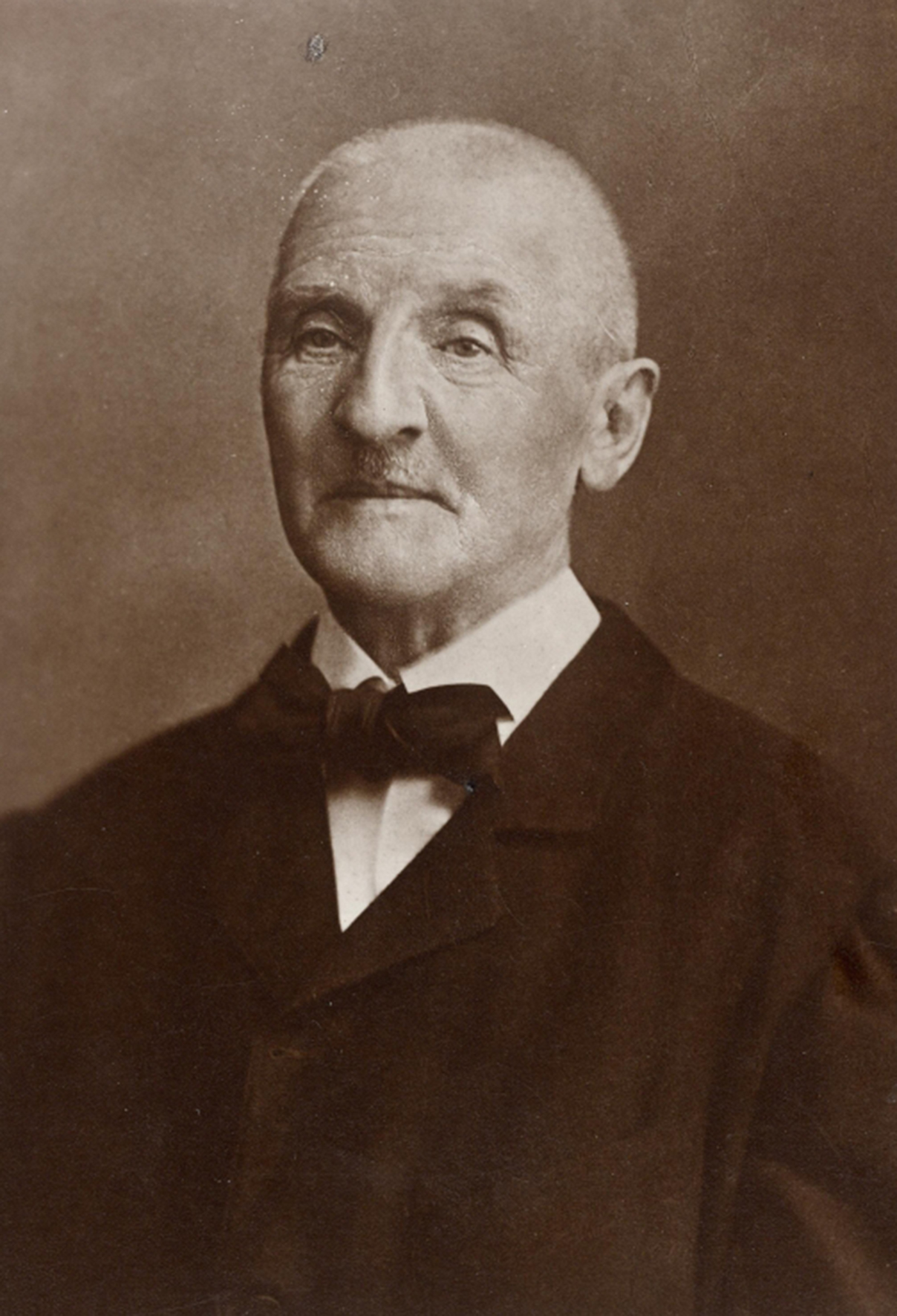
Anton Bruckner c. 1890/1895

Anton Bruckner composed eight cantatas during his life, the earliest Vergißmeinnicht, in 1845, the last, Helgoland, in 1893.

== Kronstorf and Sankt Florian ==
The five cantatas, composed between 1845 and 1855 during Bruckner's stay as schoolteacher's assistant in Kronstorf and as organist in Sankt Florian, were Name-day cantatas. These cantatas are put in Band XXII/1 of the Gesamtausgabe.

During his stay as schoolteacher's assistant in Kronstorf Bruckner composed his first cantata:

- Bruckner composed the cantata Musikalischer Versuch nach dem Kammer-Styl (Musical essay in chamber style), WAB 93, in D major for his teacher aggregation in May 1845.
  - He made a second version to celebrate the name day of Alois Knauer, the parish priest of Kronstorf.
  - He sent thereafter a third version, which he entitled Vergißmeinnicht (Do not forget me), to remind Friedrich Mayer of the promise to provide him with an employment in the St. Florian Abbey.

During his stay as organist in Sankt Florian, Bruckner composed the following four name-day cantatas:

- Entsagen (Renunciation), WAB 14, is a cantata in B-flat major composed in c. 1851 on a text of Oskar von Redwitz's Amaranth for the name day of Michael Arneth, the prior of the St. Florian Abbey.
- The Arneth Cantata Heil Vater! Dir zum hohen Feste (Hail father! To you on this noble celebration), WAB 61, is a cantata in D major composed in 1852 for the name day of Michael Arneth.
  - In 1857, he made a shortened second version as Auf Brüder! auf zur frohen Feier!, for the name day of Friedrich Mayer, the next prior of Abbey.
  - In c. 1870, a third version as Heil dir zum schöne Erstlingsfeste was set for a Primitzfeier (celebration of the first Mass) by a newly ordained priest in Kremsmünster.
- The Mayer Cantata Auf, Brüder! auf, und die Saiten zur Hand! (Let's go, brothers! and take the strings into our hands!), WAB 60, is a cantata in D major composed in 1855 for the name day of Friedrich Mayer.
- The Festgesang Sankt Jodok sproß aus edlem Stamme (Festive song "Saint Judoc came from a noble house"), WAB 15, is a cantata in C major composed at the end of 1855 for the name day of Jodok Stülz, the dean of the St. Florian Abbey.

== Linz and Vienna ==
In the 1860s, during his stay in Linz, after the end of Sechter's and Kitzler's tuition, Bruckner composed the following two cantatas:

- The festive cantata Preiset den Herrn (Praise the Lord), WAB 16, is a religious cantata in D major composed in 1862 for the celebration of the laying of the foundation stone of the new Mariä-Empfängnis-Dom of Linz.
- Germanenzug, WAB 70, is a secular, patriotic cantata in D minor composed in 1863–1864 on a text by August Silberstein for competition at the first Oberösterreichisch-Salzburgisches Sängerbundesfest.

Thirty years later, during his stay in Vienna, Bruckner composed this last cantata:

- Helgoland, WAB 71, is a secular, patriotic cantata in G minor composed in 1893 on another text by August Silberstein to celebrate the 50th birthday of the Men's Choir of Vienna.

These three cantatas are put in Band XXII/2 of the Gesamtausgabe.

== Sources ==
- Anton Bruckner – Sämtliche Werke, Band XXII/1: Kantaten und Chorwerke I (1845–1855), Musikwissenschaftlicher Verlag der Internationalen Bruckner-Gesellschaft, Franz Burkhart, Rudolf H. Führer and Leopold Nowak (Editor), Vienna, 1987
- Anton Bruckner – Sämtliche Werke, Band XXII/2: Kantaten und Chorwerke II (1862–1893), Musikwissenschaftlicher Verlag der Internationalen Bruckner-Gesellschaft, Franz Burkhart, Rudolf H. Führer and Leopold Nowak (Editor), Vienna, 1987
- Uwe Harten, Anton Bruckner. Ein Handbuch. Residenz Verlag, Salzburg, 1996. ISBN 3-7017-1030-9.
- Cornelis van Zwol, Anton Bruckner 1824-1896 - Leven en werken, uitg. Thoth, Bussum, Netherlands, 2012. ISBN 978-90-6868-590-9
