= Der deutsche Gesang, WAB 63 =

1892 song composed by Anton Bruckner

Der deutsche Gesang
- Secular choral work by Anton Bruckner
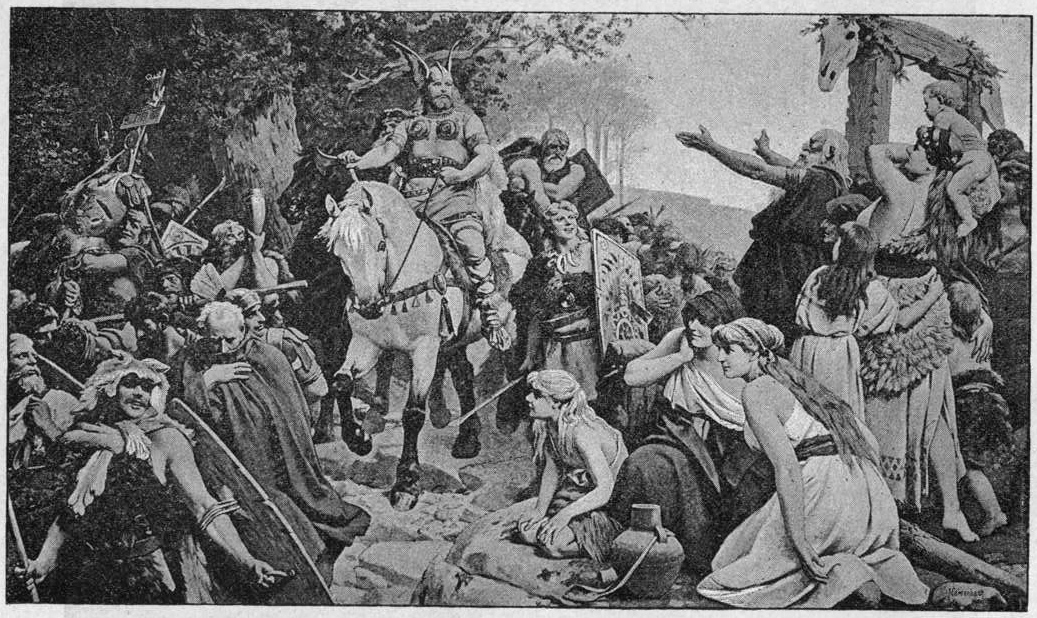
- Heimkehr der Deutschen aus der Schlacht im Teutoburger Walde by Paul Thumann
- Key: D minor
- Catalogue: WAB 63
- Form: Patriotic song
- Text: Erich Fels
- Language: German
- Composed: 29 April 1892: Vienna
- Dedication: Erstes deutsch-akademisches Sängerfest
- Published: 1911: Vienna
- Vocal: TTBB choir
- Instrumental: Brass band

Der deutsche Gesang ("The German song"), WAB 63, is a patriotic song composed by Anton Bruckner in 1892, one year before Helgoland.

== History ==
Bruckner composed Der deutsche Gesang on 29 April 1892 for the Erstes deutsch-akademisches Sängerfest (First German-academic singers' festival), which would happen in Salzburg in June 1892. The performance on 5 June under the baton of Raoul Mader was a "Kracher" (a huge success).

The original manuscript is stored in the archive of the Universitätssängerschaft 'Barden zu Wien' in Vienna. The song was first published in 1911 by Viktor Keldorfer (Universal Edition). The piece, also called Das deutsche Lied, was performed several times till the years 1930. It is put in Band XXIII/2, No. 35 of the Gesamtausgabe.

== Lyrics ==
The song uses lyrics by Erich Fels, pseudonym of Aurelius Polzer:

Wie durch Bergtal dumpf grollt Donnergedröhn,
Wie der Sturmwind saust um waldige Höhn,
Wie die Meeresflut tost an klippigem Strand,
So schalle, so schmett’re, die Feinde zu schrecken,
Die schlafferen Brüder vom Schlafe zu wecken,
Der deutsche Gesang durchs gefährdete Land!

As the thunder rumbles through mountain vallies,
As the storm wind tosses the wooded heights,
As the sea's flood roars on the craggy coast,
So breaks, so blares, to frighten the foemen,
To waken the slumbering brothers from sleeping,
German song through the land under threat!

== Music ==
The 87-bar long work in D minor, which shows affinities with the patriotic Germanenzug (1863), Sängerbund (1882) and Helgoland (1893), is scored for TTBB choir and brass instruments (4 horns, 3 trumpets, 3 trombones and contrabass-tuba).

== Discography ==
There are four recordings of Der deutsche Gesang:

- Robert Shewan, Roberts Wesleyan College Chorale and Brass Ensemble, Anton Bruckner - Sacred and Secular Choral Works – LP: Roberts Wesleyan College Records 41 448, 1983. Remastered to CD: High Definition Tape Transfers HDTT.
- Robert Shewan, Roberts Wesleyan College Chorale and Brass Ensemble, Choral Works of Anton Bruckner – CD: Albany TROY 063, 1991
- Timothy Seelig, Turtle Creek Chorale Dallas, Fort Worth Symphony Brass, Times of the Day – CD: Reference Recordings RR-67, 1995
- Thomas Kerbl, Männerchorvereinigung, Blechbläserensemble der Anton Bruckner Privatuniversität Linz, Weltliche Männerchöre – CD: LIVA 054, 2012

Note
Der deutsche Gesang has been performed at the Brucknerfest 2022 (Brucknerfest 2022 - Krieg und Frieden (29-09-2022)). A recording is available in the Bruckner Archive.

== Sources ==
- Anton Bruckner – Sämtliche Werke, Band XXIII/2: Weltliche Chorwerke (1843–1893), Musikwissenschaftlicher Verlag der Internationalen Bruckner-Gesellschaft, Angela Pachovsky and Anton Reinthaler (Editor), Vienna, 1989
- Cornelis van Zwol, Anton Bruckner 1824–1896 – Leven en werken, uitg. Thoth, Bussum, Netherlands, 2012. ISBN 978-90-6868-590-9
- Uwe Harten, Anton Bruckner. Ein Handbuch. Residenz Verlag, Salzburg, 1996. ISBN 3-7017-1030-9.
