= Helgoland (Bruckner) =

Secular cantata by Anton Bruckner

- by Anton Bruckner
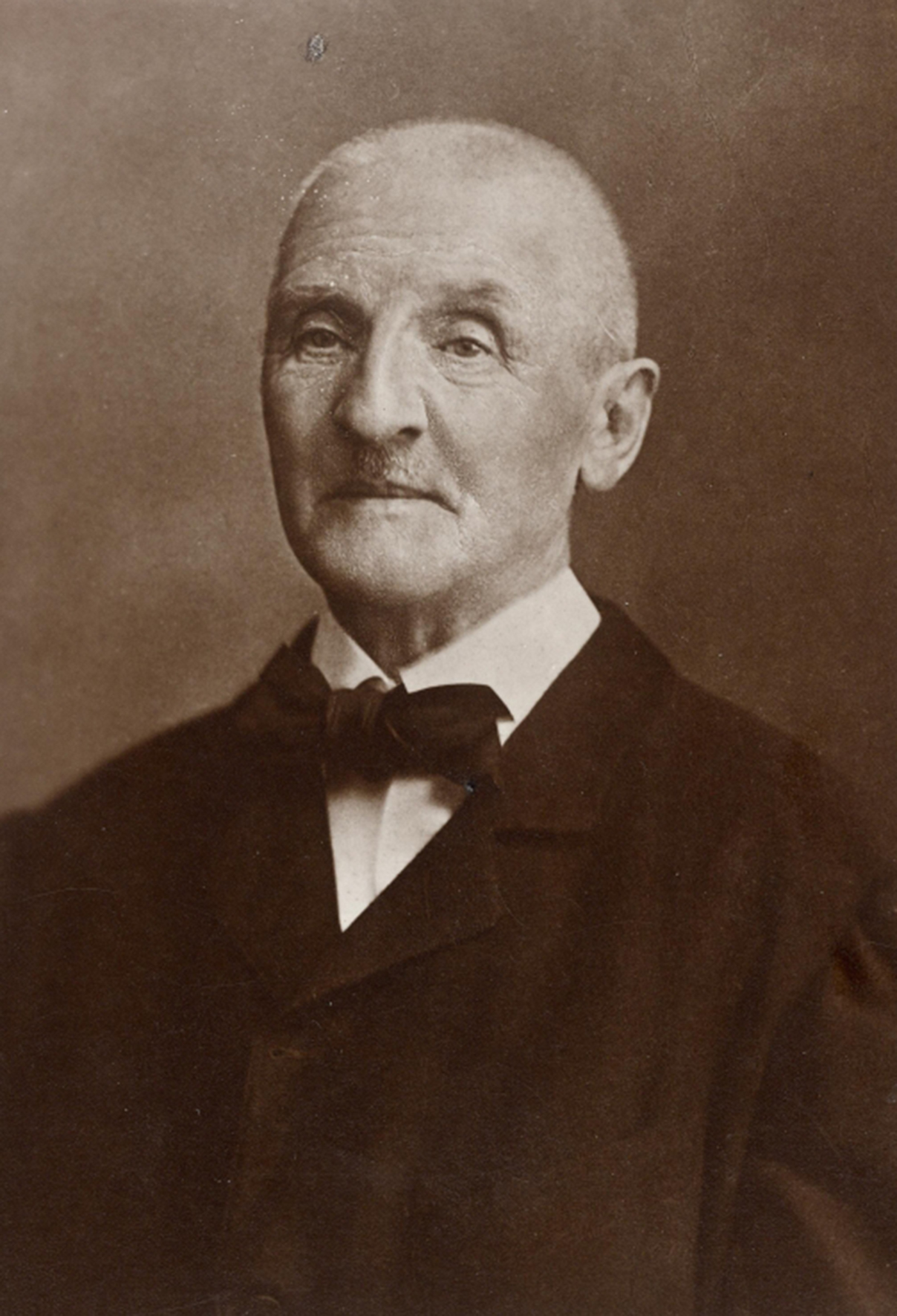
- The composer, c. 1890/1895
- Key: G minor
- Catalogue: WAB 71
- Form: Patriotic cantata
- Dedication: Men's Choir of Vienna
- Performed: 8 October 1893: Hofburg Palace, Vienna
- Published: 1893 (vocal and piano score)
- Recorded: 1977 – Wyn Morris, Ambrosian Male Voice Chorus and Symphonica of London
- Movements: 7
- Vocal: TTBB choir
- Instrumental: Orchestra

Helgoland, WAB 71, is a secular, patriotic cantata for male choir and orchestra, composed by Anton Bruckner in 1893. Since Bruckner did not complete the 9th symphony, Helgoland is his last complete work.

== History ==
One year earlier, Bruckner had already composed another, shorter patriotic work, Der deutsche Gesang (WAB 63), that was premiered at the First German Academic Song Festival in Salzburg in June 1892.

Helgoland was composed in April 1893 for the Men's Choir of Vienna to celebrate its 50th birthday. The text was written by August Silberstein, who had already provided poems set to music by Bruckner (Germanenzug in 1864 and Vaterlandslied in 1866).

The setting was a case of interest, as the Frisian island of Heligoland had just been given to Germany in 1890 by Great Britain (in exchange for Zanzibar). Helgoland was conducted on 8 October 1893 by the Men's Choir of Vienna and the Vienna Philharmonic Orchestra under Eduard Kremser's baton in the Winterreitschule of the Hofburg Palace.

Bruckner legated the manuscript to the Österreichische Nationalbibliothek. The work was first published as vocal and piano reduction score by Cyrill Hynais in 1893. The vocal and orchestral score was posthumously issued by Doblinger, Vienna in 1899. It is put in Band XXII/2 No. 8 of the Gesamtausgabe.

== Text ==
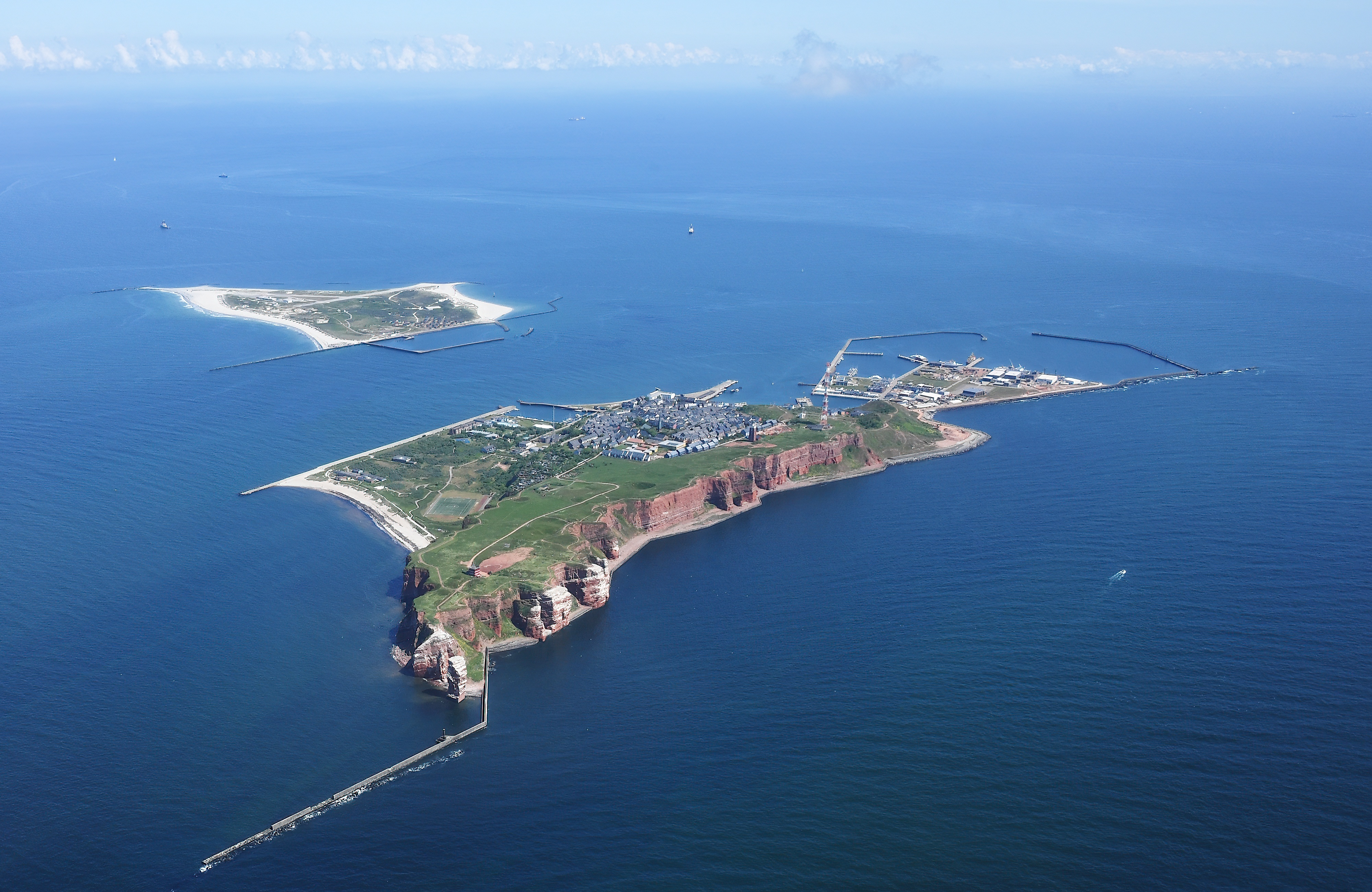
A bird's-eye view of the island of Heligoland

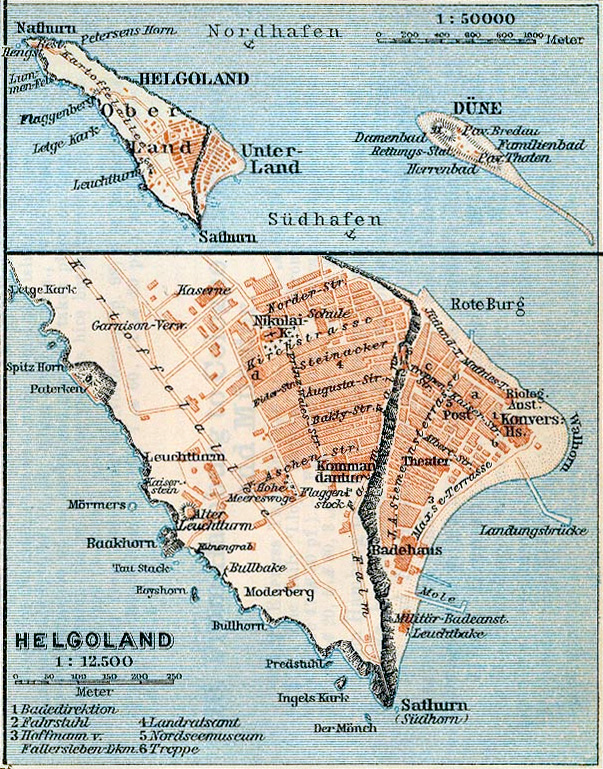
A map of Heligoland from 1910, 14 years after Bruckner's death

The text from August Silberstein's Mein Herz in Liedern focuses on the Saxon people of the island who are threatened by the invasion of the Romans, but divine intervention saves them:

Hoch auf der Nordsee, am fernesten Rand
Erscheinen die Schiffe, gleich Wolken gesenkt;
In wogenden Wellen, die Segel gespannt,
Zum Eiland der Sachsen der Römer sich lenkt!

O weh um die Stätten, so heilig gewahrt,
Die friedlichen Hütten, von Bäumen umlaubt!
Es wissen die Siedler von feindlicher Fahrt!
Was Lebens noch wert, auch Leben sie raubt!

So eilen die Zagen zum Ufer herbei,
Was nützet durch Tränen zur Ferne geblickt;
Da ringet den Besten vom Busen sich frei
Die brünstige Bitte zum Himmel geschickt:

Der du in den Wolken thronest,
Den Donner in deiner Hand,
Und über Stürmen wohnest,
Sei du uns zugewandt!

Lass toben grause Wetter,
Des Blitzes Feuerrot,
Die Feinde dort zerschmetter!
Allvater! Ein Erretter aus Tod und bitt'rer Not!
Vater!

Und siehe, die Welle, die wogend sich warf,
Sie steiget empor mit gischtenden Schaum,
Es heben die Winde sich sausend und scharf,
Die lichtesten Segel verdunkeln im Raum!

Die Schrecken des Meeres, sie ringen sich los,
Zerbrechen die Maste, zerbersten den Bug;
Der flammenden Pfeile erblitzend' Geschoss,
Das trifft sie in Donners hinhallendem Flug.

Nun, Gegner, Erbeuter, als Beute ihr bleibt,
Gesunken zu Tiefen, geschleudert zum Sand,
Das Wrackgut der Schiffe zur Insel nun treibt!
O Herrgott, dich preiset frei Helgoland!

On the North Sea's most distant horizon
Ships appear that resemble clouds;
In billowy waves with tension on the sail
The Romans approach the Saxons' isle.

Alack! The holy lieus, hitherto preserved,
The peaceful homes surrounded by trees!
The settlers are aware of the adverse armada!
Everyone being worth living, as they also steal life!

Even those who hesitated now rush to the shore
For looking with tears in the eyes is of no use;
Thus, from the most valuables' bosoms
A prayer is sent to the sky:

Thou who art enthroned in the clouds,
Who hast thunder in thy hand
And who demandest tempests,
Be benevolent upon us!

Let dreadful storms bluster,
Lightning's fire,
And smash yonder foes!
Lord! Our saviour from death and bitter hardships!
Father!

And look, the wave, that was billowing
Turns into froth-like foam,
The winds arise and they bolt fiercely,
Even the brightest sails are darkened!

The horrors of the ocean are relinquished,
They burst the masts and the bows;
The all-igniting arrows of lightning
Strike them while thunder accompanies their flight.

Now, enemy, looter, you stay as a loot,
Sunk to the ocean's depth, dashed to the sand,
Your ships' wreckage floats towards the island!
O Lord, the free Heligoland praises thee!

== Setting ==
The 317-bar long composition in G minor, scored for TTBB male choir and orchestra (2 flutes, 2 oboes, 2 clarinets, 2 bassoons, 4 horns, 3 trumpets, 3 trombones, contrabass tuba, timpani, cymbal and strings), is set as a three-part sonata form with coda.

The piece is full of strength and enthusiasm, and carries the mark of Wagner's influence. The orchestral introduction depicts already the atmosphere of storm and fate, which hangs over the text. The first part (first three strophes) depicts the approach of the enemies and the announcement of the prayer, the mid-part (next two strophes) depicts the invocation of the deity, and the third part (reprise with development) depicts the storm and the sinking of the enemies. The coda on the last verse "O Herrgott, dich preiset frei Helgoland!, with a cymbal crash near the end (bar 309), is a hymn to the deity.

Duration: about 13 minutes.

== Discography ==
Helgoland is seldom played presumably because of the text, a poem with German patriotic content, but also the high requirements, i.e., a symphonic orchestra and a professional men's choir.
Fritz Oeser made an adaptation of the work for mixed choir and orchestra, and put on it a new text „Dröhne, du Donner“ (Roar, you Thunder!), so that the work would be performed more often. However, no recording of this adaptation is available as yet.

Many noted Brucknerian conductors have neglected to record the work, although Daniel Barenboim has done it twice, at the time of his playing the symphonies of Bruckner with the Chicago Symphony Orchestra and with the Berlin Philharmonic Orchestra.

There are four commercial recordings of the work:

- Wyn Morris, Symphonica of London and Ambrosian Chorus – LP: Symphonica SYM 11 (with Wagner's "Das Liebesmahl der Apostel"), 1977; transferred to CD: IMP PCD 1042, 1993; CD: Klassic Haus KHCD-2012-043, 2012 (with Symphony No. 6 by Heinz Bongartz)
- Daniel Barenboim, Chicago Symphony Orchestra and Chicago Symphony Chorus – LP: DG 2707 116, 1979 (with Symphony "No. 0" and Psalm 150); transferred to DGG CDs: 6 October 1992 and 1 May 1995.
- Daniel Barenboim, Berlin Philharmonic Orchestra, Berlin Radio Choir and Ernst Senff Choir – CD: Teldec 0630 16646-2, 1992 (with Symphony No. 1); reissued on CD: Elektra/Wea/Teldec, June 16, 1998; in a CD-box of Barenboim's Berlin cycle by Warner Classics, 10 January 2006.
- Alberto Hold-Garrido, Choruses for Male Voices and Orchestra, Lund University Student Singers and Malmö Opera Orchestra – CD: Naxos 8572871, 2012

Note
A not-issued recording by Takashi Asahina can be heard on John Berky's website: Helgoland by T. Asahina with the Osaka Philharmonic Orchestra (1987) [Download of the Month for September, 2013]. The December, 2022 Download of the Month on the site was the 1993 out-of-print recording of the work by Wyn Morris. Other not-issued recordings by among others, Gennadi Rozhdestvensky and Neeme Järvi are stored in the Bruckner Archive.
Helgoland has also been performed at the Brucknerfest 2022 (Brucknerfest 2022 - Krieg und Frieden (29-09-2022)). A recording is available in the Bruckner Archive.

=== Transcription for organ (Martin Bernhard) ===
- Kevin M. Clarke, Bruckner, Bicentennial Houston CD – CD BSA-007 (Létourneau Organ, Episcopal Church of Saint John the Divine, Houston, 27 May 2025)

== Sources ==
- Anton Bruckner – Sämtliche Werke, Band XXII/2: Kantaten und Chorwerke II (1862–1893), Musikwissenschaftlicher Verlag der Internationalen Bruckner-Gesellschaft, Franz Burkhart, Rudolf H. Führer and Leopold Nowak (Editor), Vienna, 1987 (Available on IMSLP: Neue Gesamtausgabe, XXII/2. Kantaten und Chorwerke Teil 2: Nr. 6-8)
- Uwe Harten, Anton Bruckner. Ein Handbuch. Residenz Verlag, Salzburg, 1996. ISBN 3-7017-1030-9.
- Cornelis van Zwol, Anton Bruckner - Leven en Werken, Thot, Bussum (Netherlands), 2012. ISBN 90-686-8590-2
