= Mayer Cantata, WAB 60 =

Mayer Cantata Auf, Brüder! auf, und die Saiten zur Hand!
- by Anton Bruckner
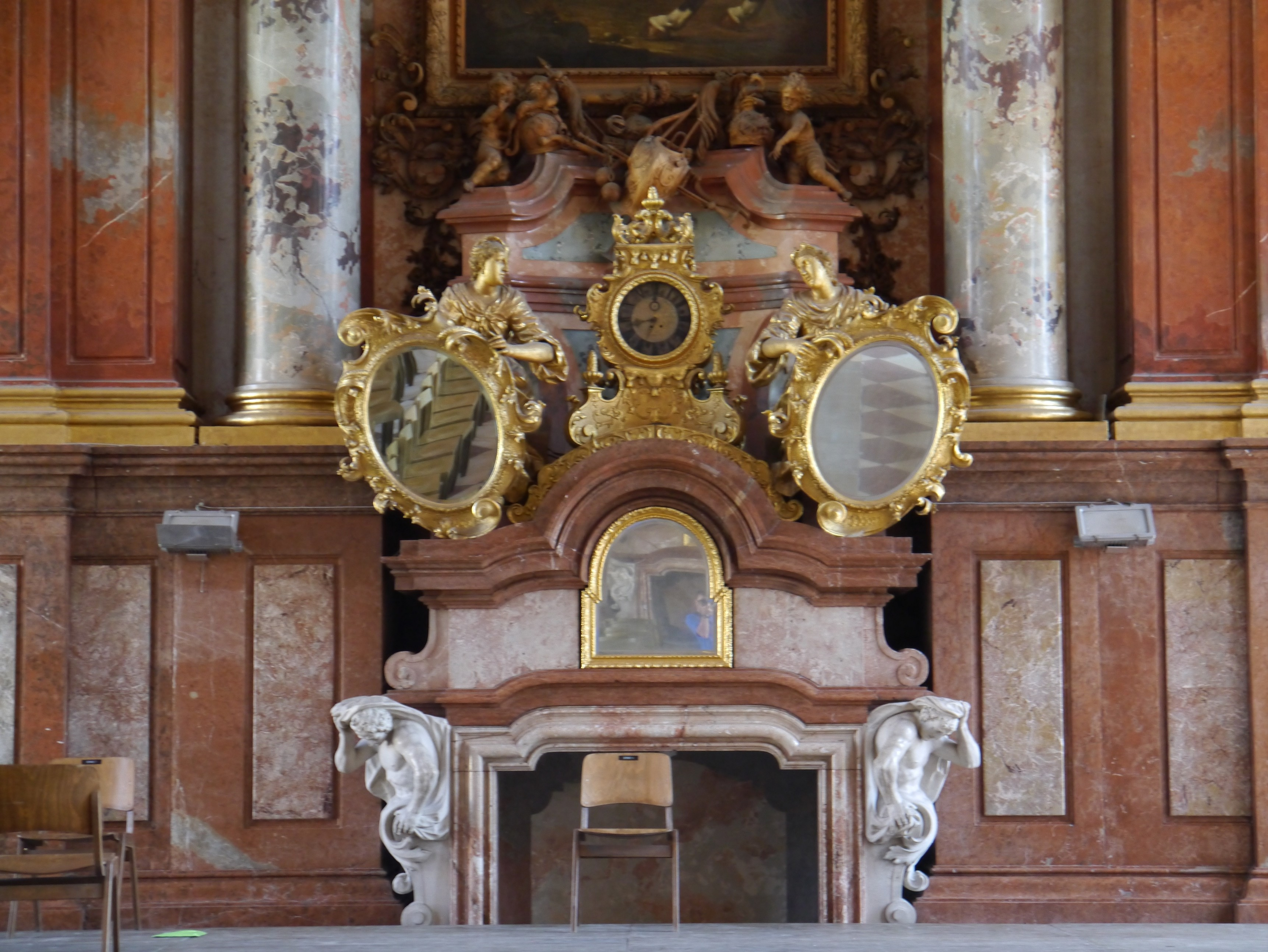
- The Marble Hall of St. Florian Abbey
- Key: D major
- Catalogue: WAB 60
- Form: Cantata
- Occasion: Name day
- Text: by Franz Ernst Marinelli
- Language: German
- Composed: 1 July 1855: St. Florian Abbey
- Dedication: Friedrich Mayer
- Vocal: SATB choir, TTBB choir and TTBB vocal quartet
- Instrumental: 2 oboes, 2 bassoons, 3 horns, 2 trumpets, 3 trombones

The Mayer Cantata, WAB 60, is a cantata composed by Anton Bruckner in 1855. It is the second of three larger-scale occasional compositions, and the composer's first extended composition for large wind ensemble and choir.

== History ==
Bruckner composed the cantata for the name-day of Friedrich Mayer, the prior of the St. Florian Abbey. The piece was performed on 17 July 1855 on the evening before Mayer's name day.

The Mayer Cantata, composed one year after the Missa solemnis, was the penultimate large work composed by Bruckner during his stay in St. Florian. Five months later, three weeks before he moved to Linz, he composed the cantata Festgesang, WAB 15, "Farewell to St. Florian".

The manuscript is stored in the archive of the St. Florian Abbey. An excerpt of the cantata was first published in band II/2, pp. 230–239 of the Göllerich/Auer biography. The cantata is put in Band XXII/1 No. 4 of the Gesamtausgabe.

== Text ==
The work is using a text by Franz Ernst Marinelli.

Auf, Brüder! auf, und die Saiten zur Hand!
Schon winket zärtlich die holde Camöne.
Sie rufet Euch in das herrliche Land
Lebendiger, ewig bezaubernder Töne.
Wir folgen, denn was sie uns singen heißt,
Das lehrt uns ein liebend versöhnender Geist,
Das strömt voll Jubel aus offener Kehle,
als träumt' es in Edens Gefilden die Seele.

Wohl ist's die Liebe, sie schlinget das Band
der Eintracht um euch in heiliger Schöne,
Wohlan, so nahet und reichet ihr Pfand
dem Helden des Tages, Ihr würdigen Söhne.

Heil unserm Vater, den wir lieben,
dem das Herz in Freude schlägt,
Der von weiser Sorg' getrieben,
seines Hauses Lasten trägt.
Heil dem Förderer des Schönen,
Heil dem edelsten Mäcen,
Dem die Engel, die versöhnen,
liebreich mild zur Seite gehen!
Der das Schroffe weiß zu wenden
und der starren Form gebeut,
Der in seine Zeit zu senden
weiß den Blick, der uns erfreut:
Heil ihm dem Edlen, Kühnen,
dessen Kraft der Jugend gleich,
Dessen Werk' verschönern, sühnen,
dessen Herz an Liebe reich!

Let's go, brothers! and take the strings into our hands!
The lovely Muse is already waving tenderly.
She is calling you into the great land
Of living and eternally enchanting tones.
We will follow for what she is asking us to sing,
A loving, reconciling spirit will teach us.
This flows full of jubilation from an open throat
As if the soul was dreaming it in the fields of Eden.

It is probably love, it ties the ribbon
of harmony around you in holy beauty,
Approach then and offer its pledge
to the hero of the day, you worthy sons.

Hail to our father, whom we love,
whose heart is beating with happiness,
He, who carries the burden of the house,
supported by his wise care.
Hail to the supporter of beauty,
hail to the most noble Maecenas,
At whose side, loving and mild,
the reconciling angels walk.
He, who knows how to tune the roughness,
and who commands the rigid form,
Who is able to send
the glance that delights us:
Hail to him, the noble, brave,
whose strength is like that of youth,
Whose work refurbishes and expiates,
whose heart is full of love.

== Setting ==
The in total 169-bar long work in D major is scored for SATB choir, TTBB choir and TTBB vocal quartet, and wind instruments (2 oboes, 2 bassoons, 3 horns, 2 trumpets and 3 trombones).

The cantata is in three movements:

1. Auf, Brüder! auf: men's choir and vocal quartet, horns and trombones (bars 1 to 27)
2. Wohl ist's die Liebe: the vocal quartet a cappella (bars 28 to 69) - Langsam, gemütlich
3. Heil unserm Vater: mixed choir, wind instruments (bars 70 to 169) - Heiter

The cantata, the second of three larger-scale occasional compositions, is Bruckner's first extended composition for large wind ensemble and choir. The first verse, which expresses a male point of view, introduced by a solo horn, is set for men's voices with instruments in a comparable register (horns and trombones). The text of the second movement, which projects a gentle, thoughtful mood, is sung with smaller forces a cappella. The words of the final stanza, which are highly celebratory, introduced by the trumpets, is using the whole tessitura of voices with a large set of wind instruments. The solo horn recalls the introductory motive, providing a musical unity. This cantata may be the first work, in which Bruckner's personal style is clearly recognisable.

== Discography ==
There is a single recording of the Mayer Cantate:

- Thomas Kerbl, Chorvereinigung, Weltliche Männerchöre – CD: LIVA 054, 2012 – in part 2 with organ colla parte, and in part 3 a 27-bar cut (bars 110-136)

== Sources ==
- August Göllerich, Anton Bruckner. Ein Lebens- und Schaffens-Bild, c. 1922 – posthumous edited by Max Auer by G. Bosse, Regensburg, 1932
- Anton Bruckner – Sämtliche Werke, Band XXII/1: Kantaten und Chorwerke I (1845–1855), Musikwissenschaftlicher Verlag der Internationalen Bruckner-Gesellschaft, Franz Burkhart, Rudolf H. Führer and Leopold Nowak (Editor), Vienna, 1987 (Available on IMSLP: Neue Gesamtausgabe, XXII/1. Kantaten und Chorwerke Teil 1: Nr. 1-5)
- Uwe Harten, Anton Bruckner. Ein Handbuch. Residenz Verlag, Salzburg, 1996. ISBN 3-7017-1030-9
- Keith William Kinder, The Wind and Wind-Chorus Music of Anton Bruckner, Greenwood Press, Westport, Connecticut, 2000
- Cornelis van Zwol, Anton Bruckner 1824–1896 – Leven en werken, uitg. Thoth, Bussum, Netherlands, 2012. ISBN 978-90-6868-590-9
- Crawford Howie, Anton Bruckner - A documentary biography, online revised edition
