= Festive Cantata (Bruckner) =

Fest-Kantate Preiset den Herrn
- by Anton Bruckner
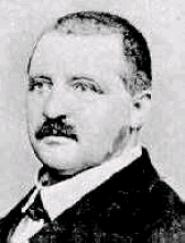
- The composer, c. 1860
- Key: D major
- Catalogue: WAB 16
- Form: Festive cantata
- Dedication: Laying of the foundation stone of the new Mariä-Empfängnis-Dom
- Performed: 1 May 1862: site of the Mariä-Empfängnis-Dom
- Published: 1932: Regensburg
- Recorded: 1994
- Movements: 8
- Vocal: TTBB choir and soloists
- Instrumental: Wind band

The Fest-Kantate Preiset den Herrn, WAB 16, is a festive cantata composed by Anton Bruckner in 1862 for the celebration of the laying of the foundation stone of the new Mariä-Empfängnis-Dom of Linz.

== History ==
To celebrate the laying of the foundation stone of the new Mariä-Empfängnis-Dom (Cathedral of the Immaculate Conception) of Linz, bishop Franz-Josef Rudigier asked Bruckner for a cantata. Bruckner responded enthusiastly with the composition of the Festive Cantata Preiset den Herrn (Praise the Lord) on a text of the theologian Maximilian Pammesberger.

On 1 May 1862 the foundation stone was laid. To celebrate the event the cantata was performed by the choir Frohsinn, invited guest singers and the brass band of the Infantry Regiment Freiherr von Bamberg No. 13 under the baton of Engelbert Lanz.

The Festive Cantata, WAB 16, is the first notable religious work that Bruckner composed after his strenuous study period by Sechter. It will be followed one year later by Psalm 112 (1863), and again one year later by the secular cantata Germanenzug and the first great mass, Mass No. 1 in D minor (1864).

The Festive Cantata was performed by Theodor Guschlbauer on 6 September 1980 during the Brucknerfest. A recording of this performance is available in the Bruckner Archive. The Cantata was also performed on 10 June 2022 during a concert to celebrate Neeme Järvi’s 85th anniversary.

The manuscript of the cantata is stored in the archive of the Episcopacy of Linz. A facsimile was first published in volume III/2, pp. 197–216 of the Göllerich/Auer biography. A choir and piano score has been issued by Doblinger in 1955. It is published in volume XXII/2 no. 6 of the Gesamtausgabe.

== Text ==
The cantata uses a text of the theologian Maximilian Pammesberger.

Preiset den Herrn,
Lobsinget seinem heiligen Namen!
Grund und Eckstein bist du, Herr,
Deiner Kirche groß und hehr.

Thaue deine Kraft und Stärke
Ueber Fundament und Stein,
Die wir zu dem heil’gen Werke
Weihend senken ein.

Preiset den Herrn, Maria preiset,
Ohne Mackel empfangen!

Aus der Erde Schooß
Wächst der Bau
Riesengroß
In des Himmels Blau.

Das ist der Unbefleckten Haus,
Drin öffnet sich die Gnadenquelle,
Und strömet reich und helle
Ins Land hinaus.

Des Landes Stämme wallen fromm
Aus allen Gauen zu dem Dom
Von unsrer lieben Frauen;
Sie grüßen sie viel tausendmal
Und schöpfen Heil im Gnadensaal
Durch Glauben und Vertrauen.

Preiset den Herrn,
Lobsingt seinem heiligen Namen,
Maria preiset,
Die mächtige Helferin. Amen.

Praise the Lord,
Sing the praises of His holy name!
My Lord, Thou art the fundament and cornerstone
Of Thy great and noble church.

Thaw Thy power and force
On foundation and stone,
Which we sink devoutly
Into the holy work!

Praise the Lord, praise Mary,
Conceived immaculate!

From the bowels of the earth
The building is growing
Striking greatly
Into the blue of the sky.

This is the house of the Immaculate,
In which the source of grace
Arises and streams rich and pure
Into the country.

The tribes from all the districts of the country
Go on a devout pilgrimage to the cathedral
Of our blessed Lady;
They greet her times without number
And find salvation in the room of grace
By faith and trust.

Praise the Lord,
Sing the praises of His holy name,
Praise Mary,
The mighty helper. Amen.

== Setting ==
The 241-bar long work in D major for men's chorus, male solo quartet, bass soloist, and wind band (2 flutes, 2 oboes, 4 clarinets, 2 bassoons, 4 horns, 3 trumpets, 3 trombones, 1 bass tuba and timpani), is composed of eight short parts:

1. Opening choir: "Preiset den Herrn", D major veering to F♯ minor – Bewegt, doch nicht zu schnell
2. Aria: "Taue deine Kraft und Stärke", A major veering to F♯ major – Solo quartet a cappella, choir repeat with woodwinds (flute, clarinet and bassoon) – Langsam, bittend
3. Bridging choir: "Preiset den Herrn", D major – Bewegt, nicht zu schnell
4. Arioso: "Aus der Erde Schoß", G major – Bass soloist – Langsam, nicht schleppend
5. Aria: "Das ist der Unbefleckten Haus", E♭ major – Solo quartet a cappella with internal repetition – Langsam bewegt
6. Prelude by reed instruments (clarinets and bassoons), E♭ major veering to G major
7. Chorale: "Des Landes Stämme wallen fromm", a cappella, G major
8. Final choir "Preiset den Herrn", D major – Bewegt, nicht zu schnell

Total duration: 10 to 13 minutes.

The opening choir with its starting octave leap in unison, as in the Overture in G minor, and its reminiscence to the Arneth Cantata is majestic and solemn. It thereafter evolves in a fugato on "Grund und Eckstein bist du, o Herr". To bind the work together the solemn opening choir is repeated twice, in the third and eight parts.

Preiset den Herrn … demonstrates Bruckner’s primary concerns at the time of composition—form and orchestration. His interest in form is reflected in the closely related melodies, repetition of motives among the movements, and especially in the finale, which sums up the entire composition, by making reference to much of what has preceded it. … The contrast of full ensemble with a variety of smaller groups is convincing, and Bruckner has made effective use of the timbral resources available to him. … Bruckner’s chord and key choices are often surprising and indicate that he was developing much more confidence in his unorthodox harmonic ideas.

== Selected discography ==
A commercial recording in full accordance with the original score edited by the critical Gesamtausgabe is still awaited.

Out of the seven commercial recordings, Petr Fiala's live performance – with trombones colla parte during the choir repeat of part 2 (mm. 70–82) – is the most in accordance with the original score. Thomas Kerbl's live recording – without basstuba and with organ colla parte for a cappella parts 2, 5 and 7 – is, according to Hans Roelofs, also a convincing performance.

The Festive Cantata has undergone several adaptations: for choir, only with organ accompaniment, for mixed choir with a different text ...
The two recordings by Track follow his own adaptations, one for male-voice choir (1990), the other as Festkantate zur Weihnacht (festive Christmas cantata) for mixed choir with Herbert Vogg’s text "Ehre sei Gott in der Höhe" (1996).

In the version for male-voice choir the Arioso (part 4) is skipped. Parts 2 and 5 are accompanied by organ, part 7 is sung a cappella.
In the version for mixed choir (Festkantate zur Weihnacht) part 4 is sung by the male voices with the original instruments, parts 2, 5 – converted to C major – and 7 are sung by the whole choir with organ. Because of the female voices and the organ accompaniment this version sounds smoother than the original version.

- Martin L. Fiala, Steyrer Männergesang-Verein Sängerlust and Bläserkreis Oberösterreichischer Landesmusikschullehrer, Festkonzert – CD: Ensemble Electronique EE-004CD, 1994 (Live)
- Thomas Kerbl, Männerchorvereinigung Bruckner 08, Ensemble Linz, Philipp Sonntag (Organ), Anton Bruckner, Männerchöre – CD: Bruckner Haus LIVA027, 2008 (Live)
- Gerhard Track, Wiener Männergesang-Verein, Wiener Schubertbund, Slovak Radio Symphony Orchestra, Manfred Schiebel (Organ), Ausgewählte Chorwerke – CD issued by the Wiener Schubertbund, 1990 (Live)
- Gerhard Track, Choir and Symphony Orchestra of the Konservatorium Wien, Manfred Schiebel (Organ), Gerhard Track dirigiert Anton Bruckner – CD: PMI Records-USA PMI 20105, 1996 (Live)

== Sources ==
- August Göllerich, Anton Bruckner. Ein Lebens- und Schaffens-Bild, c. 1922 – posthumous edited by Max Auer by G. Bosse, Regensburg, 1932
- Anton Bruckner – Sämtliche Werke, Band XXII/2: Kantaten und Chorwerke II (1862–1893), Musikwissenschaftlicher Verlag der Internationalen Bruckner-Gesellschaft, Franz Burkhart, Rudolf H. Führer and Leopold Nowak (Editor), Vienna, 1987 (Available on IMSLP: Neue Gesamtausgabe, XXII/2. Kantaten und Chorwerke Teil 2: Nr. 6-8)
- John Williamson, The Cambridge Companion to Bruckner, Cambridge University Press, Cambridge, 2004. ISBN 0-521-80404-3
- Cornelis van Zwol, Anton Bruckner - Leven en Werken , Thot, Bussum (Netherlands), 2012. ISBN 90-686-8590-2
- Uwe Harten, Anton Bruckner. Ein Handbuch. Residenz Verlag, Salzburg, 1996. ISBN 3-7017-1030-9.
- Crawford Howie, Anton Bruckner - A documentary biography, online revised edition
