= Symphonic Prelude (Bruckner) =

Symphonisches Präludium
- by Anton Bruckner or his entourage
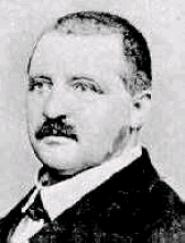
- The composer, c. 1860
- Key: C minor
- Catalogue: WAB 332
- Form: Overture
- Composed: 1876: Linz
- Performed: 7 September 1949: Munich
- Published: 2002
- Recorded: 2013
- Instrumental: Orchestra

The Symphonisches Präludium (Symphonic Prelude) in C minor, WAB add 332, is an orchestral composition by Anton Bruckner or his entourage, composed in 1876. The work was discovered shortly after World War II. Heinrich Tschuppik, who found the orchestral score of the work in the estate of Bruckner's pupil Rudolf Krzyzanowski, attributed the authorship to Bruckner. Thirty years later, Mahler scholar Paul Banks, who knew only a four-stave reduction of the work, proposed that the work might be attributed to Mahler. While the exact circumstances of the composition of this Prelude have not been determined, it is certain to have been composed within the circle of Bruckner and his students at the Vienna Conservatory of Music. Based on the original orchestral score, it seems likely that the work was at least sketched by Bruckner, possibly as an exercise in orchestration for Krzyzanowski.

== History ==
After World War II, Heinrich Tschuppik discovered a 43-page long manuscript of an unknown overture-like symphonic movement in C-minor in the estate of his uncle, Rudolf Krzyzanowski. The manuscript carried the inscription Rudolf Krzyzanowski cop. 1876 on the first page, and on the last page in large blue letters von Anton Bruckner (by Anton Bruckner).

=== An unknown work by Anton Bruckner? ===
Krzyzanowski was a pupil of Anton Bruckner, who, together with Gustav Mahler, prepared in 1877 the piano transcription of Bruckner's Third Symphony. Tschuppik reported his finding in the Schweizerische Musikzeitung and in the Süddeutsche Zeitung, prepared a clean copy of the score and handwritten orchestral parts, and arranged also a four-stave particello of it. A copy of the manuscript was also made for storing in the Österreichische Nationalbibliothek.

Tschuppik showed the piece to experts on Bruckner, Max Auer and Franz Gräflinger, and conductor Volkmar Andreae. Andreae agreed to perform this unknown Sinfonisches Präludium with the Vienna Philharmonic. However, the performance, which had been planned for 23 January 1949 did not take place, because Leopold Nowak, who was asked for expertise, had not been able to come to a final conclusion about the authorship. The premiere was performed later by the Munich Philharmonic under Fritz Rieger on 7 September 1949.

Shortly afterwards Tschuppik died and his clean copy, handwritten orchestral parts, and a photocopy of the four stave particello remained stored in the archive of the Munich Philharmonic. The photocopy of the original manuscript (A-WnPhA2355) remained in Nowak's possession and was returned to the Österreichische Nationalbibliothek after his death in May 1991. Nowak had not included the Symphonisches Präludium in Bruckner's Gesamtausgabe because he still doubted its authorship.

=== A youthful work by Gustav Mahler? ===
Tschuppik had also given a copy of his own particello arrangement of the Präludium to Gertrud Staub-Schläpfer in Zürich. After studying the piece, Staub-Schläpfer wrote on top of the particello: Könnte das nicht eine Arbeit f. Prüfung von Gustav Mahler sein? Krzyzanowski gab den Klavierauszug zur dritten Symphonie Bruckners (2. Fassung) heraus mit Mahler zusammen. (Could this perhaps be composed by Gustav Mahler for his examination? Krzyzanowski edited the piano arrangement of Bruckner's Third Symphony (second version) together with Mahler.) On 7 September 1949, on the same day as the first performance of the Präludium in Munich, she gave the particello (A-WnMus.Hs.34241) to the Österreichische Nationalbibliothek.

Thirty years later, Mahler scholar Paul Banks discovered in the Österreichische Nationalbibliothek the particello annotated by Staub-Schläpfer and, following her suggestion, assumed that the piece could indeed be one of the lost works that Mahler had composed during his time at the Vienna Conservatory. Since the particello was the only known source, Berlin composer Albrecht Gürsching was asked to complement the instrumentation. This "reconstruction" was first performed by the Berlin Radio Symphony Orchestra under Lawrence Foster on 15 March 1981 as "Symphonisches Präludium by Gustav Mahler". A recording of Foster's performance and a few other not issued performances are put in the Bruckner archive. The Gürsching orchestration has been recorded by Neeme Järvi in 1992 and Vladimir Jurowski in 2016.

=== The truth? ===
The truth (?) came to the light in 1985 when Wolfgang Hiltl discovered the documents stored in the archive of the Munich Philharmonic. He bought Krzyzanowski's original manuscript from Tschuppik's family and let it be published by Doblinger. Nevertheless, not everyone became convinced that the piece was originated by Bruckner and so the "controversial" piece remained rarely performed.

The original orchestration was performed by Gerhard Samuel with the Cincinnati Symphony Orchestra in March 1997, and, in 2010, by Baldur Brönnimann with the BBC National Orchestra of Wales and Markus Stenz with the Concertgebouw Orchestra of Amsterdam, respectively. A recording of these three performances is put in the Bruckner archive. A recording of a performance (2013) by Michelle Perrin Blair conducting the Moores School Orchestra is published under the auspices of the Bruckner Society of America. The original orchestration was also performed by Markus Poschner with the Bruckner Orchestra Linz during the 2021 Brucknerfest.

=== Note ===
In 2008, Wolfgang Hiltl died unexpectedly and Krzyzanowski's original manuscript of the "Symphonic Prelude" ended up on the garbage slope of his apartment …

== Music ==
Wolfgang Hiltl, who undertook a meticulous examination of the 293-bar long manuscript in the light of Bruckner's contemporary pieces, came to the conclusion that the most likely assumption would be that Bruckner had given a score to Krzyzanowski, perhaps as an exercise in instrumentation. It seemed clear that the entire musical substance was by Bruckner himself, most likely as an "emerging autograph score", with all string parts, some important lines for woodwind and brass, and perhaps a few passages already entirely completed.

=== Setting ===
Krzyzanowski's copy is laid out only for Bruckner's typical orchestra of double woodwind, four horns, two trumpets, three trombones, bass-tuba, timpani, and strings, the orchestration (except for a third trumpet) used by Bruckner in his Fifth Symphony, composed in 1875/1876, revised in 1877/1878.

The first theme, which contains the core of the main themes of the First and Second Symphony in C minor, as well as allusions to the Sleep motif of Die Walküre, is repeated in tutti (bar 43), leading into a dark chorale (bar 59), pre-shadowing the structure of that from the Finale of the Ninth Symphony, and even a significant epilogue (bar 73), which is used later in the development (bar 160).
The second theme (bar 87) reflects ideas of the Third Symphony and the miserere of the D minor Mass.
The closing theme is an energetic trumpet call with a repeated minor ninth, as at the beginning of the Adagio from the Ninth Symphony, which is also pre-shadowing the end of its first movement.

The second part (bar 148) brings two elements from the main theme in variants, leading into a threefold outburst of it in the dominant (bar 195), tonic (bar 201) and subdominant (bar 207). The recapitulation of the second theme is a fugato (bar 221) with a development section, which again reflects the Third Symphony (bars 249), leading into a climax, in which both first and second themes appear simultaneously (bar 267).
The rather short coda is merely a final cadence with almost no thematic material left, only reflecting the closing theme, as a repeated chain of minor seconds. One may assume that this elaboration by Krzyzanowski, which sounds rather provisional, may have been filled-up later with more concise motivic derivations.

It seems indeed clear from Hiltl's stylistic examination that the musical material itself is all Bruckner's, because some of these ideas even anticipate some music from the Ninth Symphony, composed some 25 years later, which nobody can have known already in 1876. In all, this "Symphonic Prelude" constitutes an extremely advanced, "experimental" sonata movement, with a dramatic, almost radical second part combining development, recapitulation and coda to a unified and radical second part. The musical language and structure anticipate much of Bruckner's last composition, the symphonic choralwork Helgoland (1893).

== Discography ==
=== Re-orchestration by Gürsching ===
Two recordings:

- Neeme Järvi, Scottish National Orchestra, Mahler: Symphony No. 6, Sinfonisches Präludium – CD: Chandos CHAN 9207, 1992
- Vladimir Jurowski, Radio Symphony Orchestra Berlin, Strauss: Also sprach Zarathustra, Mahler: Totenfeier, Sinfonisches Präludium für Orchester – Pentatone SACD PTC 5186 597, 2016

=== Original orchestration ===
Three recordings:

- Franz Anton Krager & Michelle Perrin Blair, Houston Symphony Chorus, Moores School Orchestra & Sigurd Øgaard (organ), Anton Bruckner: Symphonisches Präludium, Mass No. 3 in F minor, Postludium Organ Improvisation – CD/BD: abruckner.com BSVD-0116, 2013
- Jakub Hrůša with the Bamberger Symphoniker, Hans Rott: Symphony No. 1 in E Major, Mahler: Blumine, Bruckner: Symphonisches Präludium - CD: DGG, 2022
- Mursel Yavuz, Moores School of Music Orchestra: Bruckner - Bicentennial Houston CD − CD BSA-007 (2025)

=== Organ transcription ===
- Hansjörg Albrecht, The Bruckner Symphonies, Vol. 3 – Organ Transcriptions – CD Oehms Classics OC479, 2022.

== Sources ==
- Wolfgang Hiltl, Ein vergessenes, unerkanntes Werk Anton Bruckners?, in Studien zur Musikwissenschaft / Beihefte der Denkmäler der Tonkunst in Österreich, Vol. 36, Tutzing, 1985
- Cornelis van Zwol, Anton Bruckner 1824–1896 – Leven en werken, uitg. Thoth, Bussum, Netherlands, 2012. ISBN 978-90-6868-590-9
