= Entsagen, WAB 14 =

Entsagen
- by Anton Bruckner
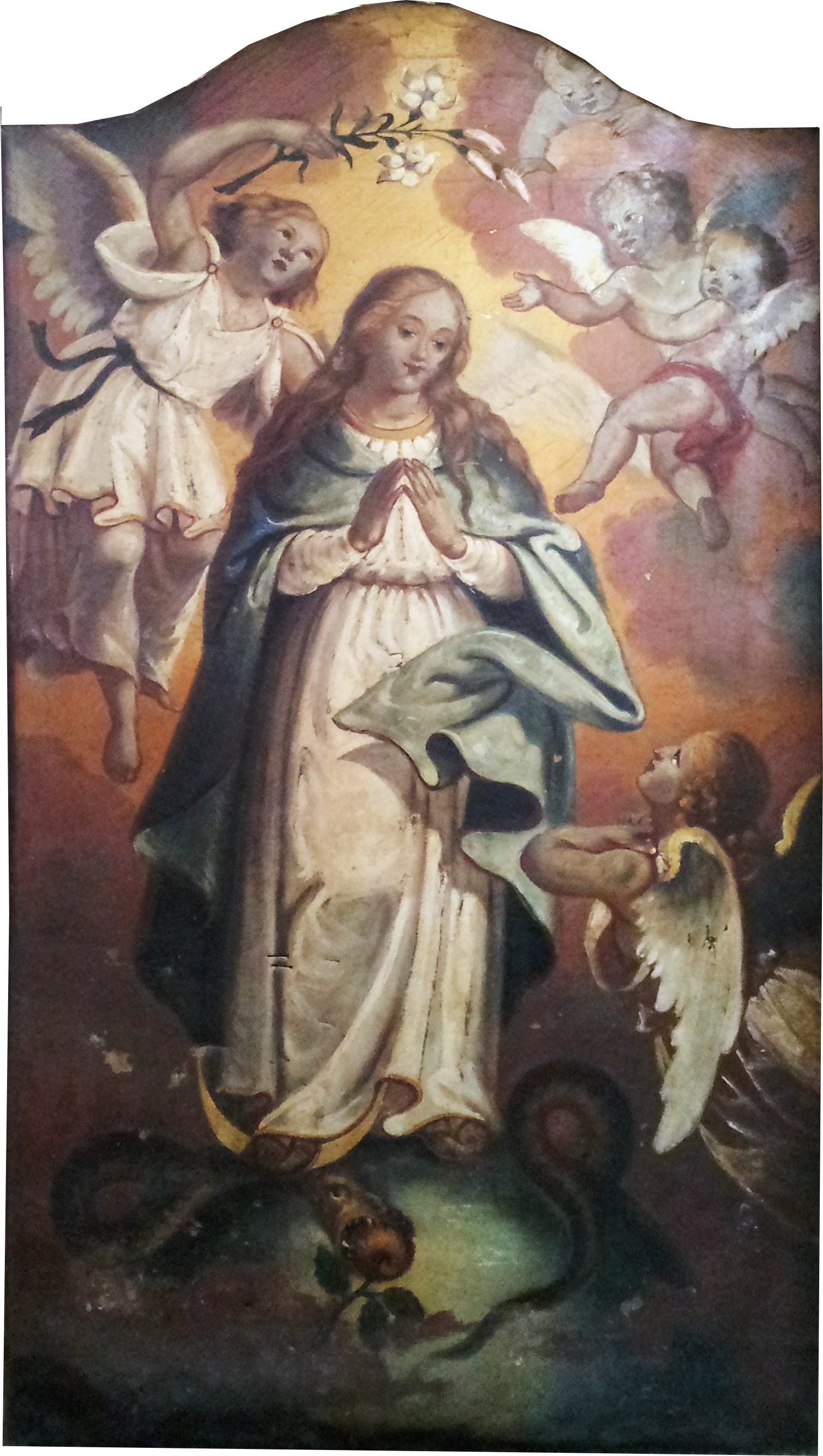
- Virgin Mary by Jurij Tavčar
- Key: B-flat major
- Catalogue: WAB 14
- Form: Cantata
- Text: Oskar van Retwitz
- Language: German
- Composed: c. 1851: St. Florian Abbey
- Dedication: Michael Arneth
- Vocal: SATB choir or quartet – ST soloist
- Instrumental: Organ or piano

The cantata Entsagen (Renunciation), WAB 14, is a cantata composed by Anton Bruckner in c. 1851.

== History ==
Bruckner composed the cantata for the name-day of Michael Arneth, the prior of the St. Florian Abbey. The piece was intended to be performed on Arneth's name-day. It is not known when it was performed.

Why Bruckner has chosen this unsound text for the name-day of his Maecenas remains unexplained. Perhaps he has put so into music his resignation following his father's death or Aloisia Bogner's refusal of his proposal of marriage.

The manuscript is stored in the archive of the St. Florian Abbey. A facsimile of the cantata was first issued in band II/2, pp. 47–58 of the Göllerich/Auer biography. The cantata was thereafter issued by Ludwig Daxsperger in 1956. It is put in Band XXII/1 No. 2 of the Gesamtausgabe.

== Text ==
The work is based on the poem Amaranth by Oskar von Redwitz.

O Maria!
Du Jungfrau mild und hehr!
Du zogst mich, mutterlos,
Zu deines Sohnes Ehr',
Die treu'ste Mutter groß!
Lehr' mich auch nun ertragen
Den Willen meines Herrn,
Gehorsam im Entsagen,
Du des Gehorsams Stern!
Spiegel der Demut, Maria!

O Maria!
Du Quell der heil'gen Lieb'!
Nimm meine Lieb' mir ab,
Und der so treu sie gieb,
Die schon den Ring ihm gab!
Nichts Andres mir gewähre,
Als dass er glücklich sei!
Lass mir nur diese Zähre
Und steh' mir tröstend bei,
Mutter der Liebe, Maria!

O Maria!
Du starker Himmelsschild!
O deck' ihn immerdar,
Im lauten Schlachtgefild,
In heimlicher Gefahr!
Ich will nicht sein begehren,
Doch ewig segn' ich ihn;
Mit deinen Engelheeren
O woll' sein Haupt umziehn,
Mächtige Herrin, Maria!

O Mary!
Noble and clement virgin!
Thou didst raise me, the motherless,
To the glory of thy Son,
Thou most faithful Mother!
Teach me also to bear now
The will of my Lord,
Obedient in renunciation,
Thou, star of obedience!
Mirror of humility, Mary!

O Mary!
Thou source of holy love!
Take my love from me
And give it so faithfully to her
who already gave him the ring!
Nothing else grant me
Than that he be happy.
Just leave me this tear
And comfort me,
Mother of love, Mary!

O Mary!
Strong shield of Heaven!
O protect him for ever,
On the noisy battlefield,
In secret danger!
I do not want to desire him,
However I bless him for ever.
With thy armies of angels
O surround his head,
Powerful Lady, Mary!

== Setting ==
The 126-bar long work in B♭ major is scored for SATB choir or quartet, soprano or tenor soloist, and organ (or piano).

The cantata is a ‘spiritual song’ in three sections, in ABA′ form:

1. Choir: O Maria! Du Jungfrau mild und hehr!, bittend und mit Andacht
2. Aria: O Maria! Du Quell der heil'gen Lieb'!, langsam, betend - soprano or tenor soloist
3. Choir: O Maria! Du starker Himmelsschild!, bittend und mit Andacht

The outer sections are in the form of Protestant chorale, with in bars 16–19 (Die treu'ste Mutter groß!) and 110–113 (In heimlicher Gefahr!) a direct quotation from "O Haupt voll Blut und Wunden".
The expressive middle section, a solo for soprano or tenor in F major, is with large intervals and strong modulation. The contrapuntal accompaniment by the organ (or piano) has some reminiscences of the baroque opera.

== Sources ==
- August Göllerich, Anton Bruckner. Ein Lebens- und Schaffens-Bild, c. 1922 – posthumous edited by Max Auer by G. Bosse, Regensburg, 1932
- Uwe Harten, Anton Bruckner. Ein Handbuch. Residenz Verlag, Salzburg, 1996. ISBN 3-7017-1030-9
- Anton Bruckner – Sämtliche Werke, Band XXII/1: Kantaten und Chorwerke I (1845–1855), Musikwissenschaftlicher Verlag der Internationalen Bruckner-Gesellschaft, Franz Burkhart, Rudolf H. Führer and Leopold Nowak (Editor), Vienna, 1987 (Available on IMSLP: Neue Gesamtausgabe, XXII/1. Kantaten und Chorwerke Teil 1: Nr. 1-5)
- Cornelis van Zwol, Anton Bruckner 1824–1896 – Leven en werken, uitg. Thoth, Bussum, Netherlands, 2012. ISBN 978-90-6868-590-9
- Crawford Howie, Anton Bruckner - A documentary biography, online revised edition
