= Germanenzug =

Cantata composed by Anton Bruckner

- by Anton Bruckner
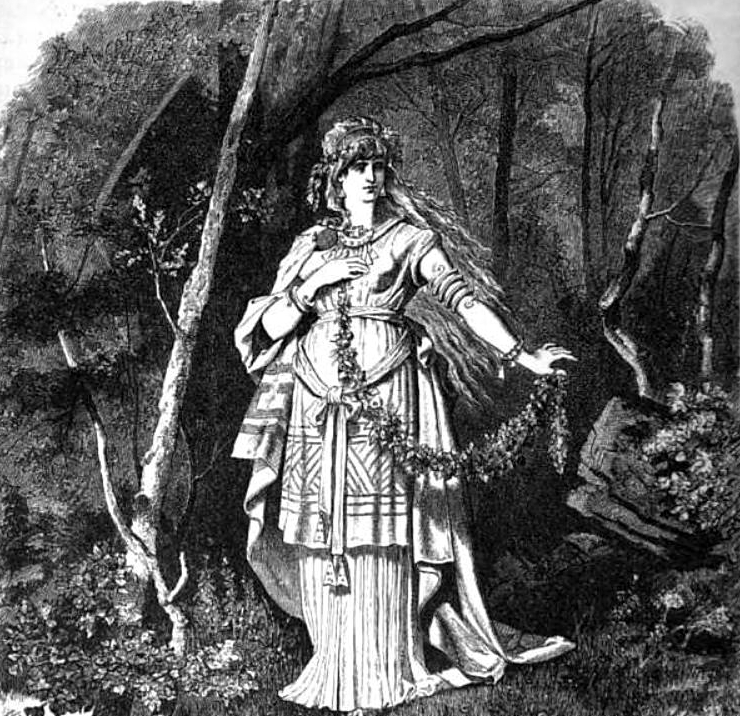
- Freya by Carl Emil Doepler
- Key: D minor
- Catalogue: WAB 70
- Form: Patriotic cantata
- Composed: July 1863 – August 1864: Linz
- Performed: 5 June 1865: Linz
- Published: 1865
- Recorded: 1991
- Movements: 3
- Vocal: TTBB choir and soloists
- Instrumental: Brass ensemble

Germanenzug (WAB 70) is a secular, patriotic cantata composed in 1863–1864 by Anton Bruckner on a text by August Silberstein.

== History ==
After the completion of Psalm 112, Bruckner composed Germanenzug in July 1863. It is the first major example of occasional pieces set to secular texts Bruckner would write throughout his career for the Liedertafeln.

Bruckner entered it for a competition at the first Oberösterreichisches Sängerbundesfest, scheduled for August 1864 in Linz. Bruckner's original intention was to use the Zigeuner-Waldlied, a lost work (WAB 135), as basis for this entry, but after correspondence with Silberstein and his close friend Rudolf Weinwurm, Bruckner replaced it with the patriotic poem of the Viennese poet and journalist August Silberstein.

During the spring of 1864, the festival was postponed. It was rescheduled for 4–6 June 1865, and renamed Oberösterreichisch-Salzburgisches Sängerbundesfest. Bruckner fine-tuned his composition till August 1864 before submission. Bruckner's and Weinwurm's entries were two of the eight compositions chosen to proceed to the final stages. The eight selected compositions were issued in the same year by Josef Kränzl, Ried.

At the festival the Liedertafel Frohsinn performed Germanenzug under Bruckner's baton on 5 June. Germanenzug was awarded second prize. The winning composition was Weinwurm's Germania.

Thirty years later, in 1893, Bruckner would compose a second secular cantata on a text by Silberstein, Helgoland (WAB 71) which would become Bruckner's last completed work. That Bruckner valued Germanenzug is shown by his request that the middle section be performed as part of observances after his death.

The work, the manuscript of which is stored in the archive of the Kremsmünster Abbey, is put in Band XXII/2 No. 7 of the Gesamtausgabe.

== Text ==
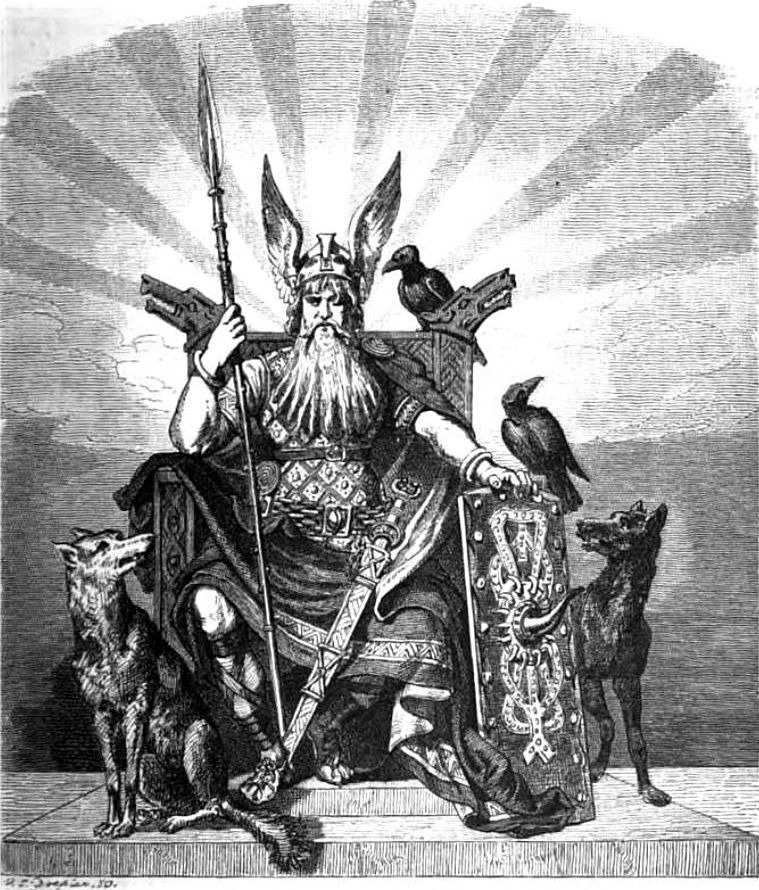
Odin by Carl Emil Doepler

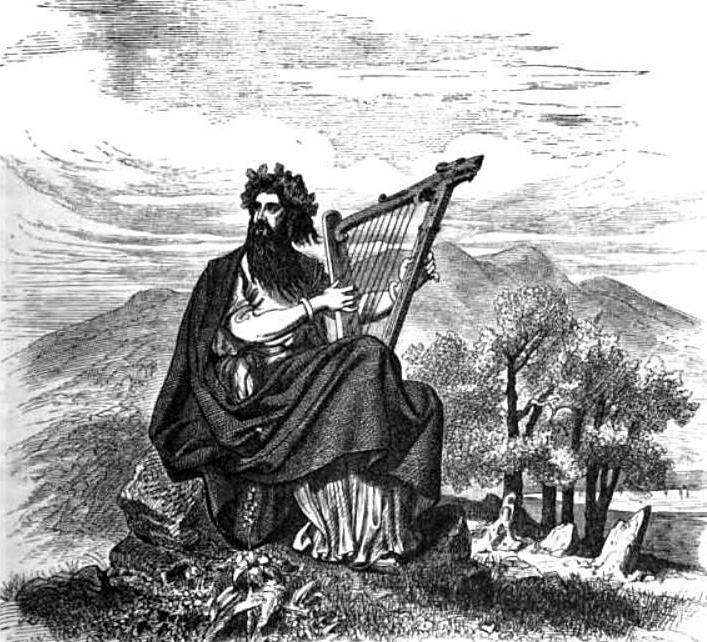
Bragi by Carl Emil Doepler

The work uses a text by August Silberstein:

Germanen durchschreiten des Urwaldes Nacht,
Sie ziehen zum Kampfe, zu heiliger Schlacht.
Es steh'n die Eichen im düsteren Kreis,
Und sie rauschen so bang und flüstern so leis,
Als sollte der Krieger gewaltigen Schwarm
Durchdringen die Ahnung, erfassen der Harm!

Sie aber, sie wandeln urkräftigen Tritts,
So nahet der Donner mit zündendem Blitz!
Und aus des Gezweiges wild düsterem Hang,
Da wird es jetzt lauter, da tönt ein Gesang,
Denn der Walkyren bewachend Geleit
Umschwebet die Helden und singet vom Streit.

In Odins Hallen ist es licht und fern der Erdenpein,
Aus Freyas Wonnestrahlen bricht die Seligkeit herein!
Solgofnir ruft den gold'nen Tag und Bragas Harfe klingt,
Mit Balmungschlag und im Gelag, die süße Zeit entschwingt.

In Odins Hallen ist es licht und fern der Erdenpein.
Wer mutig für das Höchste ficht, der geht zu Göttern ein!
O, Liebe ist's, die uns beschwingt, zu künden das Geschick.
Der Kampf nun winkt, ihr alle sinkt, und keiner kehrt zurück!

Da schlagen die Krieger mit wilder Gewalt
Die Schwerter zum Schilde, dass es hallt und erschallt!
"Und soll denn dies Schreiten das letzte auch sein,
So wollen wir gerne dem Tode uns weih'n;
Doch möge aus diesem so mutigen Zieh'n
Der Segen der Heimat, das Siegen erblüh'n!

Teutonias Söhne, mit freudigem Mut,
Sie geben so gerne ihr Leben und Blut,
Die Freiheit, die Heimat ja ewig bestehn,
Die flüchtigen Güter, sie mögen vergehn!"
So riefen die Krieger, so zogen sie fort,
Gesegnet ihr Tun und bewahret ihr Wort!

Germans stride the forest's darkness,
They are looking for struggle and holy battle.
Oak trees form a bleak circle,
And rustle anxiously and whisper quietly
As if foreboding and grief were to grip
The enormous army of warriors.

They, however, stroll with firm steps,
While thunder and all-igniting lightning approach!
And from the dark branches
Louder noises are heard, a song resounds
As the valkyries waft around
And guard the heroes, and sing about battle.

Odin's halls are full of light and free of earthly pain,
And bliss gushes out of Freya's rays of delight!
Solgofnir calls for golden day, and Bragi's harp sounds,
The sweet time arises with sword clang and revelry.

Odin's halls are full of light and free of earthly pain.
He who courageously fights for the highest goods will sit next to the gods!
O, 't is love that elates us to announce your fate.
Battle awaits you, and everyone will fall, none will return!

Here, the warriors boisterously strike
The swords against the shield so that it resounds!
"And if this be our last march,
We willingly devote ourselves to death;
But may the blessing of our home and victory bloom
Due to this courageous trek.

Teutonia's sons, with joyous courage,
Gladly give their lives and blood.
As liberty and fatherland will always exist,
Dwindling goods may elapse!"
Thus cried the warriors who marched towards battle,
Whose deeds may be blest and whose words may be preserved.

At the end of the first page of his manuscript Bruckner added the following text:

- Freya: Göttin der Liebe im lichten Himmel (the goddess of love in the full-of-light heaven);
- Solgofnir: der goldkämmige Hahn, der den Morgen ruft und die Helden weckt (the cock with the golden comb, which calls the morning and wakes up the heroes);
- Braga: Gott der Dichtung und Tonkunst (the god of poetry and arts);
- Balmung: Heldenschwert (Sigurd's sword); Balmungschlag: Schwertschlag (sword clang);
- Odin: oberster Gott (the chief god);
- Walkyren: die beflügelten Jungfrauen, welche Helden in die Schlacht und Seelen in dem Himmel geleiten (the winged maidens, who lead heroes into battle, and souls to heaven).

== Setting ==
The 118-bar work in D minor is scored for TTBB male-voice choir, male solo quartet, and brass ensemble (two cornets, four trumpets, four horns, a baritone horn (Tenorhorn) or Euphonium, three trombones, and a bass tuba). Duration: about 8 minutes.

Structurally the cantata consists of three main sections, each with internal repetition. The outer sections portray German warriors going into battle, and the middle section is a song of the Valkyries who describe the delight of Valhalla, the destination of heroes who are killed in battle. The "A-B-A" structure is topped off with a coda.

The first section (36 bars), "Germanen durchschreiten des Urwaldes Nacht", is in D minor. The sharply dotted leaping octave motive at the beginning is a slightly altered variant of the Festive cantata Preiset den Herrn. The slower middle section (39 bars), "In Odins Hallen ist es licht", is the most adventurous harmonically. It features reduced forces of a solo male quartet and the four horns. A solo horn leads from the quartet without pause in the third section (43 bars), "Da schlagen die Krieger mit wilder Gewalt", which begins with a repetition of the first section. Thereafter it proceeds to D major and new material for the stirring coda ("Die Freiheit, die Heimat ja ewig bestehn").

The mature Bruckner style is already present. The strongly-dotted rhythms which accent the brass writing in the first section prefigure passages in Bruckner's Symphony No. 1 and later symphonic works. The use of the key of D minor is an early instance of his special preference for this tonality, which is shared with the Requiem, the Mass No. 1 and three symphonies: "No. 0", No. 3 and the valedictory No. 9.

Harmonic usage is fully nineteenth-century, centred around root progressions and key contrasts in thirds. Particularly in the second part, substantial passages appear where no more than a few chords can be analyzed in any one key. The instruments are more independent of the voices than in previous works in this genre by Bruckner. While they continue to double and support the choir, they also add extra harmony and contrapuntal lines, and contribute substantially to the effectiveness of the tone painting.

== Discography ==
There are a few recordings of Germanenzug:

- Robert Shewan, Roberts Wesleyan College Chorale and Brass Ensemble, Choral Works of Anton Bruckner – CD: Albany TROY 063, 1991
- Attila Nagy, Universitätssängerschaft 'Barden zu Wien', Men's choir of Vienna and Hungarian Brass Ensemble, Anton Bruckner und seine Zeit – CD: Disc-Lazarus DL-USB 8B, 18 May 1996
- Attila Nagy, Universitätssängerschaft 'Barden zu Wien', Men's choirs of Vienna and Musikverein Hörsching, Konzert im Brucknerjahr – CD: Disc-Lazarus DL-USB 8D, 26 October 1996

Nagy recorded Germanenzug two other times with the same choir and piano accompaniment, instead of brass ensemble:

- Bruckner-Festabend anlässlich des 100. Todestages von Ehrenmitglied Anton Bruckner – CD: Disc-Lazarus DL-USB 8C, 7 June 1996
- Im Denken treu, im Liede deutsch – CD: Disc-Lazarus DL-USB 26, between 1997 and 2007

Note
Germanezug has been performed at the Brucknerfest 2022 (Brucknerfest 2022 - Krieg und Frieden (29-09-2022)). A recording is available in the Bruckner Archive.

== See also ==
- Arminius (Bruch)
- Helgoland (Bruckner)

== Sources ==
- Anton Bruckner – Sämtliche Werke, Band XXII/2: Kantaten und Chorwerke II (1862–1893), Musikwissenschaftlicher Verlag der Internationalen Bruckner-Gesellschaft, Franz Burkhart, Rudolf H. Führer and Leopold Nowak (Editor), Vienna, 1987 (Available on IMSLP: Neue Gesamtausgabe, XXII/2. Kantaten und Chorwerke Teil 2: Nr. 6-8)
- John Proffitt, booklet of the CD: R. Shewan, Choral Works of Anton Bruckner, 1991
- Uwe Harten, Anton Bruckner. Ein Handbuch. Residenz Verlag, Salzburg, 1996. ISBN 3-7017-1030-9.
- John Williamson, The Cambridge companion to Bruckner, Cambridge University Press, 2004. ISBN 0-521-00878-6
- Keith William Kinder, The wind and wind-chorus music of Anton Bruckner, Greenwood Press, Westport CT, 2000. ISBN 0-313-30834-9
- Cornelis van Zwol, Anton Bruckner - Leven en Werken, Thot, Bussum (Netherlands), 2012. ISBN 90-686-8590-2
- Crawford Howie, Anton Bruckner - A documentary biography, online revised edition
