= Vaterländisch Weinlied, WAB 91 =

Vaterländisch Weinlied
- Secular choral work by Anton Bruckner
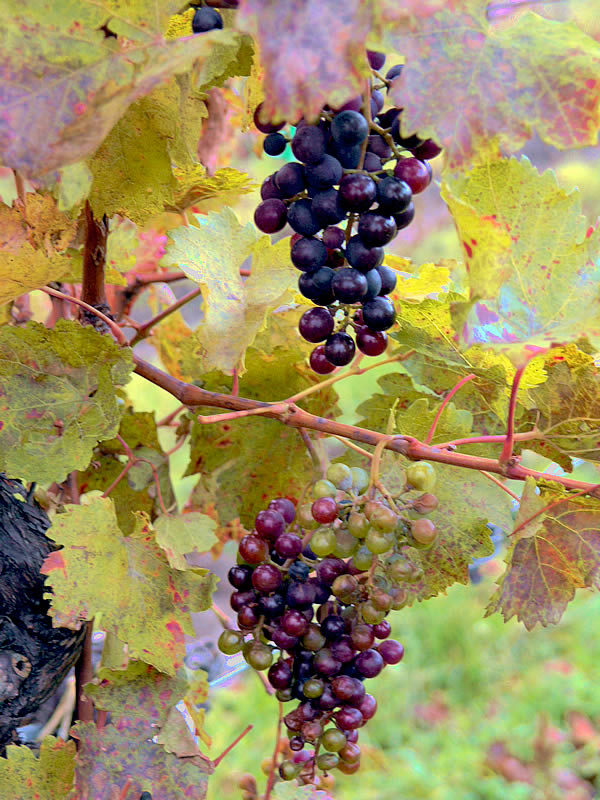
- Grapes in a vineyard near Sooss, Lower Austria
- Key: C major
- Catalogue: WAB 91
- Form: Drinking song
- Text: August Silberstein
- Language: German
- Composed: November 1866: Linz
- Published: 1892: Vienna
- Vocal: TTBB choir

Vaterländisch Weinlied (Patriotic wine song), WAB 91, is a song composed by Anton Bruckner in 1866 during his stay in Linz.

== History ==
Bruckner composed this work, together with Vaterlandslied, on a six-strophe text of August Silberstein in November 1866 during his stay in Linz on request of Anton M. Storch. The song was performed by the Liedertafel Frohsinn on 13 February 1868 under Bruckner's baton.

The work, of which the original manuscript is lost, was first issued in the Wiener Compositionalbum by Emil Berté in 1892. Thereafter (September 1894), it was issued with another text by Bibamus as Eine Wein-Legende (A wine legend) in the Neues Wiener Journal. The work is issued in Band XXIII/2, No. 21 of the Gesamtausgabe.

== Text ==
The Vaterländisch Weinlied uses a text by August Silberstein.

Wer möchte nicht beim Rebensaft
Des Vaterlands gedenken?
Ein Lebehoch aus voller Kraft
Wollen wir ihm schenken!
Wie die Reben
Mög' sich's heben
In dem Streben auf zum Licht!

Who would not want, drinking the grapes' juice,
Commemorate the fatherland?
We want to give it
Cheers with full power!
Like the vines
May it rise
In the aspiration up to light!

== Music ==
The 12-bar long work in C major is scored for TTBB choir - "ein Trinklied mit höherem moralische Hintergrund" ("a drinking song with higher ethical background"), which exhibits a peculiar imprint with unexpected inflexions and austere harmonies in a narrow time span.

== Discography ==
There is a single recording of Vaterländisch Weinlied.

- Thomas Kerbl, Männerchorvereinigung Bruckner 12, Weltliche Männerchöre – CD: LIVA 054, 2012 – 1st and 6th strophes

== Sources ==
- Anton Bruckner – Sämtliche Werke, Band XXIII/2: Weltliche Chorwerke (1843–1893), Musikwissenschaftlicher Verlag der Internationalen Bruckner-Gesellschaft, Angela Pachovsky and Anton Reinthaler (Editor), Vienna, 1989
- Cornelis van Zwol, Anton Bruckner 1824–1896 – Leven en werken, uitg. Thoth, Bussum, Netherlands, 2012. ISBN 978-90-6868-590-9
- Uwe Harten, Anton Bruckner. Ein Handbuch. Residenz Verlag, Salzburg, 1996. ISBN 3-7017-1030-9.
- Crawford Howie, Anton Bruckner - A documentary biography, online revised edition
