= Zur Vermählungsfeier, WAB 54 =

1878 wedding song composed by Anton Bruckner

Zur Vermählungsfeier
- Secular choral work by Anton Bruckner
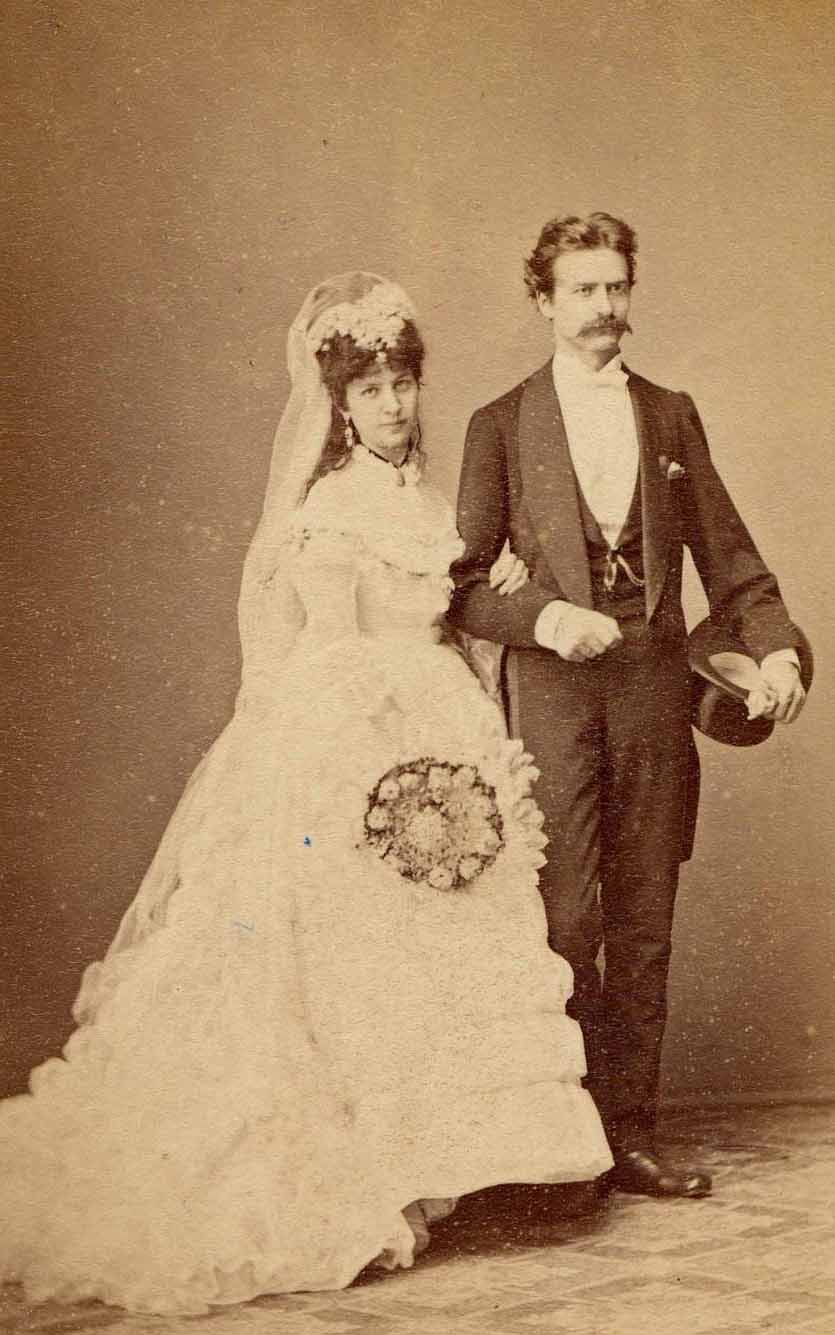
- An 1870 wedding in Austria
- English: For the wedding ceremony
- Key: D major
- Catalogue: WAB 54
- Form: Wedding music
- Language: German
- Composed: 27 November 1878: Vienna
- Dedication: Wedding of Anton Ölzelt Ritter von Newin
- Published: 1910: Vienna & Leipzig
- Vocal: TTBB choir

Zur Vermählungsfeier ("For the wedding ceremony"), WAB 54, is a wedding song composed by Anton Bruckner on 27 November 1878.

== History ==
Bruckner composed the setting for the wedding ceremony of his landlord Anton Ölzelt Ritter von Newin with Amalie Edler von Wieser. The piece was intended to be performed during the ceremony in the church of the Klosterneuburg Abbey. However, the ceremony did not occur, because the groom was a Protestant.

The original manuscript is stored in the archive of the Gesellschaft der Musikfreunde in Vienna. It was first published in the yearbook of the Klosterneuburg Abbey (Vienna & Leipzig) in 1910. It has been re-edited by Wöss in 1921 together with the Ave Regina caelorum, WAB 8. It is put in Band XXIII/2, No. 30 of the Gesamtausgabe.

It is not known when the piece was performed first. A performance by the Hilliard Ensemble occurred on 15 September 1993 during the 20th Brucknerfest.

== Text ==
The work sets a text by Heinrich von der Mattig.

Zwei Herzen haben sich gefunden
Und durch die Ehe sich verbunden.
Gesegnet hat des Priesters Hand
Das Paar, geknüpft das Liebesband.

Hat euch vereint der Geist der Wahrheit,
Habt ihr erfasst die Pflicht der Klarheit,
Dann ist der Ehe Heiligtum
Ein himmlisches Elysium.

So möge euch fürs ganze Leben
Der Himmel Heil und Segen geben,
Auch mein Gebet ruft heute laut:
Gott segne Bräutigam und Braut!

Two hearts have found each other
And bound together in marriage.
The hand of the Priest has blessed
The couple, establishing their band of love.

If the spirit of truth has united you
And you understood the duty of clarity,
Then the sanctuary of marriage is
A heavenly Elysium.

So may for your whole life
Heaven give you holiness and blessing,
Also my prayer calls today loudly:
God bless groom and bride!

== Music ==
The 64-bar long work in D major is scored for a men's choir TTBB a cappella.

== Discography ==
There is a single recording of Zur Vermählungsfeier:

- Thomas Kerbl, Chorvereinigung Bruckner 12, Weltliche Männerchöre – CD: LIVA 054, 2012 (sung by a men's vocal quartet)

== Sources ==
- Anton Bruckner – Sämtliche Werke, Band XXIII/2: Weltliche Chorwerke (1843–1893), Musikwissenschaftlicher Verlag der Internationalen Bruckner-Gesellschaft, Angela Pachovsky and Anton Reinthaler (Editor), Vienna, 1989
- Uwe Harten, Anton Bruckner. Ein Handbuch. Residenz Verlag, Salzburg, 1996. ISBN 3-7017-1030-9.
- Cornelis van Zwol, Anton Bruckner 1824–1896 – Leven en werken, uitg. Thoth, Bussum, Netherlands, 2012. ISBN 978-90-6868-590-9
