= Ave Regina caelorum, WAB 8 =

1886 motet composed by Anton Bruckner

Ave Regina caelorum
- Motet by Anton Bruckner
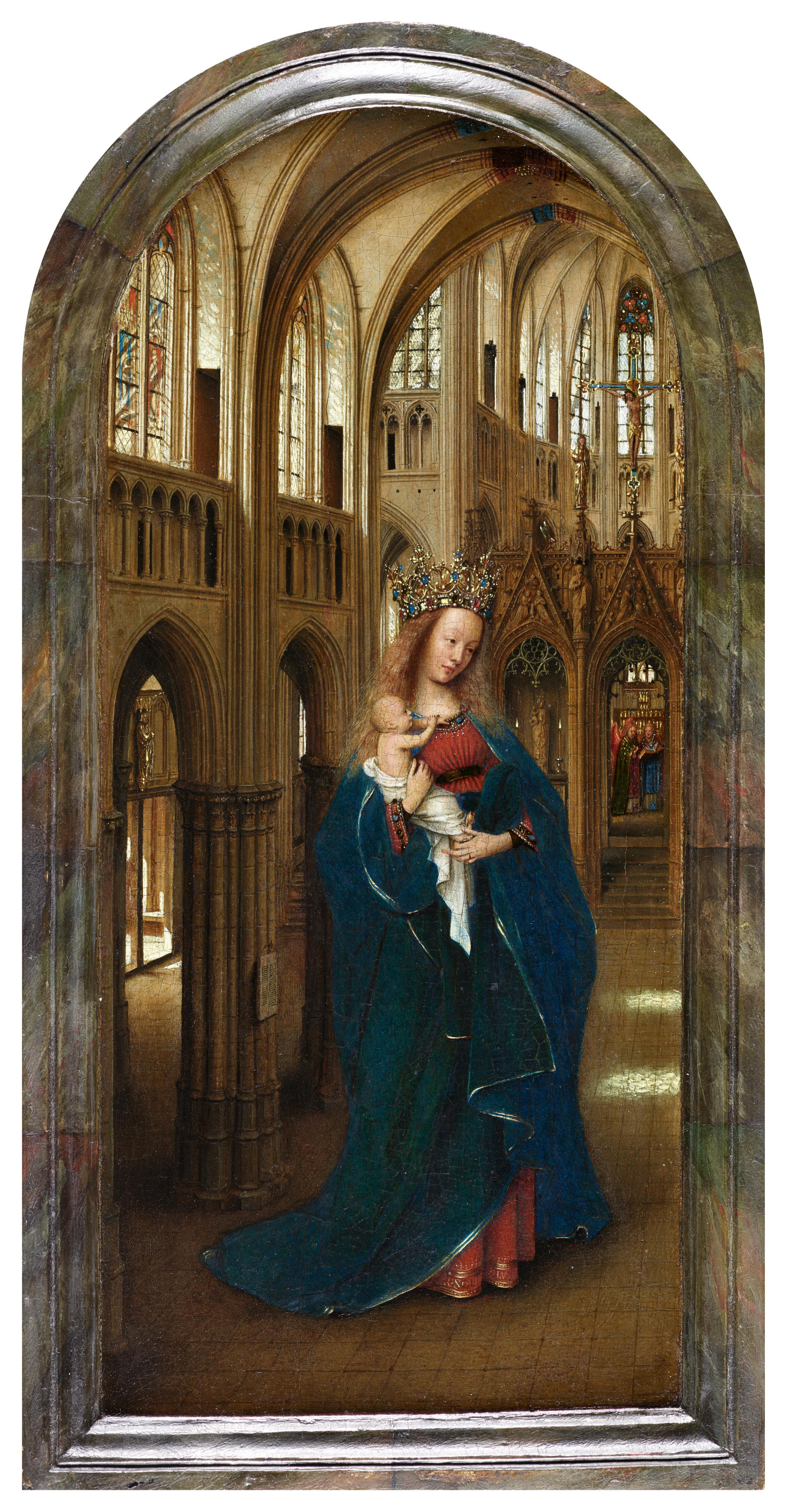
- Madonna by Jan van Eyck
- Key: Gregorian mode
- Catalogue: WAB 8
- Form: Marian Antiphon
- Text: Ave Regina caelorum
- Language: Latin
- Composed: c. 1886: Vienna
- Published: 1910: Klosterneuburg
- Vocal: Voice(s)
- Instrumental: Organ

Ave Regina caelorum (Hail, Queen of Heaven), WAB 8, is a motet composed by Anton Bruckner in c. 1886 .

== History ==
The motet was composed in c. 1886 on request of Ferdinand Schölzig, Master of novices at the Klosterneuburg Abbey. The Marian antiphon was performed first on 25 March 1886 (Feast of the Annunciation).

Bruckner's manuscript is stored in the Österreichische Nationalbibliothek. The motet was first published in 1910 in the third yearbook of the Klosterneuburg Abbey. It has been re-edited by Wöss in 1921 together with the Zur Vermählungsfeier, WAB 54. It is put in Band XXI/36 of the Gesamtausgabe.

== Music ==
The Bruckner's compostition is a not a mere harmonisation of a Gregorian antiphon, but rather a choral paraphrase of the Ave Regina caelorum for voice(s) and organ or, according to Leopold Nowak, an original composition by Bruckner in Gregorian style.

== Discography ==
Until 2019 none of the about ten recordings faithfully follows Bruckner's original score. According to Hans Roelofs, only two of the recordings follow it more or less:

- Robert Shewan, Roberts Wesleyan College Chorale, Choral Works of Anton Bruckner – CD: Albany TROY 063, 1991
- Franz Farnberger, St. Florianer Sängerknaben, Anton Bruckner in St. Florian – Requiem & Motetten CD: Studio SM D2639 SM 44, 1997

More recently these two recording according to the original score were issued:

- Ricardo Luna, Wiener Madrigalchor at 53:10 of the Benefizkonzert für den Wiener Stephansdom, 6 October 2007
- Kevin M. Clarke, Chorus Regi Cantorum, Houston, on Bruckner - Bicentennial Houston CD (St John Vianney Roman Catholic Church, Houston, 11 October 2024) – CD BSA-007

== Sources ==
- Anton Bruckner – Sämtliche Werke, Band XXI: Kleine Kirchenmusikwerke, Musikwissenschaftlicher Verlag der Internationalen Bruckner-Gesellschaft, Hans Bauernfeind and Leopold Nowak (Editor), Vienna, 1984/2001
- Cornelis van Zwol, Anton Bruckner 1824–1896 – Leven en werken, uitg. Thoth, Bussum, Netherlands, 2012. ISBN 978-90-6868-590-9
- Uwe Harten, Anton Bruckner. Ein Handbuch. Residenz Verlag, Salzburg, 1996. ISBN 3-7017-1030-9.
