= Festgesang, WAB 15 =

Festgesang
- by Anton Bruckner
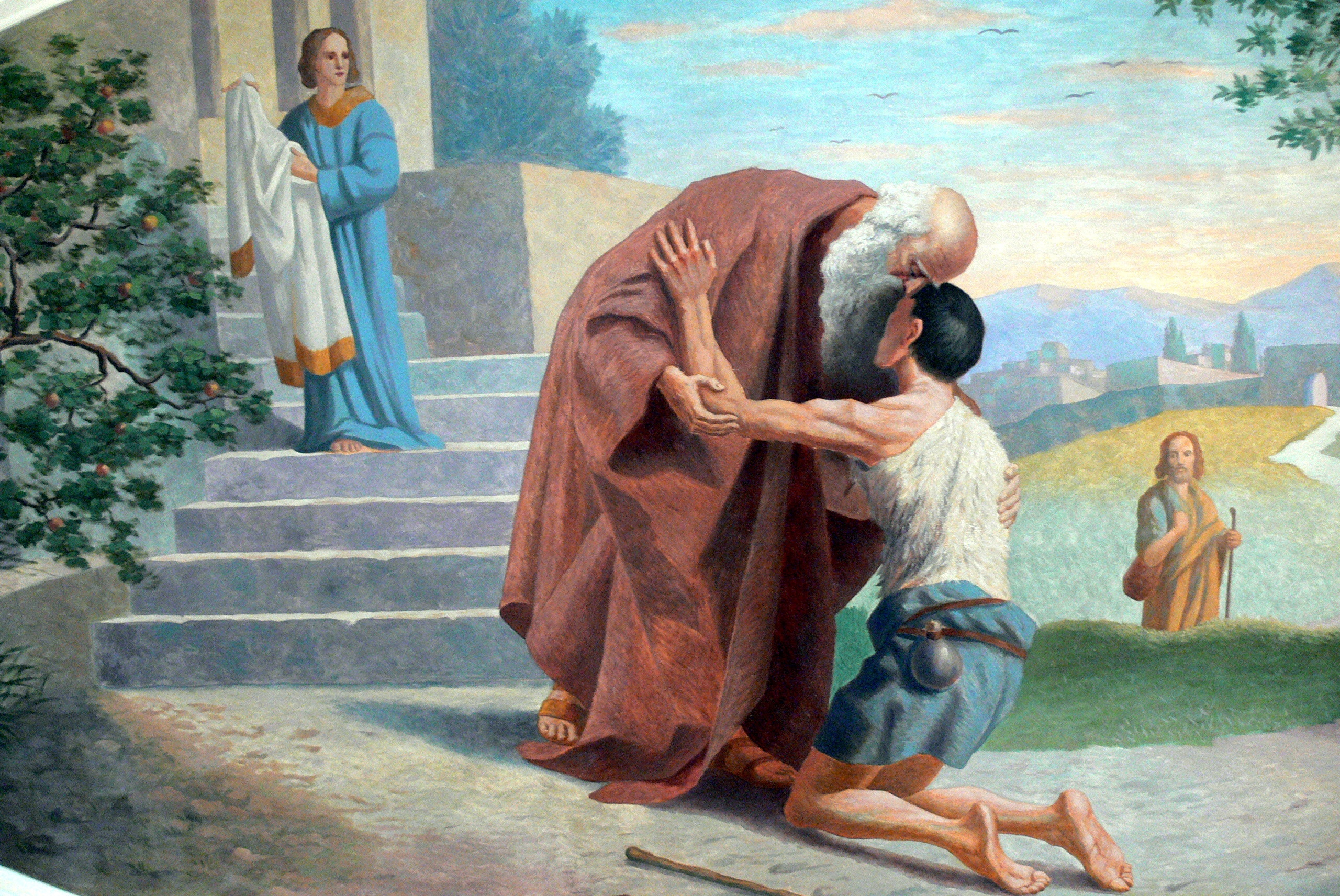
- Fresco of Saint Judoc, parish church of Bezau
- Key: C major
- Catalogue: WAB 15
- Form: Cantata
- Language: German
- Composed: 6 December 1855: St. Florian Abbey
- Dedication: Jodok Stülz
- Vocal: SATB choir and STB soloists
- Instrumental: Piano

The Festgesang (Festive song), WAB 15, is a cantata composed by Anton Bruckner in 1855.

== History ==
This cantata, also called Jodok Cantata, is the last of three larger-scale occasional compositions.

Bruckner composed it on 6 December 1855 for the name-day of Jodok Stülz, the dean of the St. Florian Abbey, as a "Farewell to St. Florian", three weeks before he moved to Linz. The piece was intended to be performed on 13 December 1855 (Stülz's name day) or the evening before. The manuscript is stored in the archive of the St. Florian Abbey.

The manuscript was retrieved in 1921 by Franz Xaver Müller in the archive of the St. Florian Abbey. A facsimile was first published in volume II/2, pp. 241–244 of the Göllerich/Auer biography. It is published in volume XXII/1 no. 5 of the Gesamtausgabe.

== Text ==
The text used for the cantata is by an unknown author:

Sankt Jodok sproß aus edlem Stamme,
der Glanz der Welt hat ihm gelacht.
Doch ihm war Gott der höchste Name,
und dem hat er sich dargebracht.

In Einsamkeit zurückgezogen,
ging er dort selig seine Bahn
und schritt, so fern von Sturm und Wogen,
zum hehren Himmel still hinan!
Dein Sinn ist so auf Gott gerichtet,
was recht, was gut, fühlt deine Brust.
Du fühlst dich nur dem Herrn verpflichtet,
und sein Gesetz nur bringt dir Lust.

Du bist der Vater deiner Herde,
ihr Heil ist wahrlich all dein Glück,
und bebest nicht vor der Beschwerde
so wie ein Mietling feig zurück.
Aus weiter Fern' bist du gekommen,
ihr beizustehen in Streit und Tod,
als du die Kunde dort vernommen,
dass ihr die böse Seuche droht.

Du pflegst das Herz der lieben Kleinen,
du führst Erwachsene zu Gott,
weißt Ernst mit Güte zu vereinen
und linderst tröstend jede Not.
Du leuchtest vor durch deine Taten
und unterstützest so dein Wort,
und nie noch sah man dich ermatten,
du schrittest kräftiger nur fort.

Nicht minder ziert dich edles Wissen,
du kennst Geschichte meisterhaft,
und was Archive tief verschließen,
hast manches du ans Licht geschafft.

So sei denn Gott auf deinen Wegen,
er tröste dich, wird es dir bang!
Stets kommt dir seine Huld entgegen
und er erhalte dich uns lang!

Saint Judoc came from a noble house,
the world's splendour was fortunate to him.
However, God was for him the supreme name,
and he had devoted himself to Him.

Retired in solitude,
He went his way blessedly
And stepped, so far from storm and waves,
Calmly up to the highest heaven!
Your mind was so focused on God,
That you feel what is right, is good.
You feel committed to the Lord,
And his law only is your delight.

You are the father of your flock,
Its salvation is really all your joy,
And you do not quiver before the labour
Cowardly back like a hireling.
You came from far away,
To help it in fight and death,
When you heard the news
That a bad scourge threatened it.

You care for the heart of the lovely children,
You bring the adults to God,
You know to combine seriousness with goodness
And alleviate consoling every need.
You are shining through your actions
And sustain your word by them,
And one never saw you drooped,
You proceeded even more strongly.

Noble knowledge adorns you, too,
You are an expert of history,
And what archives held enclosed
You have often brought to light.

So be God on your way,
He console you, should you be scared!
His grace will always meet you,
May he preserve you long for us!

== Setting ==
The in total 143-bar long work in C major is scored for SATB choir and STB soloists, and piano.

The cantata is in six parts:

1. Recitative "Sankt Jodok sproß": bass soloist (bars 1–7)
2. Aria "In Einsamkeit zurückgezogen": bass soloist (bars 8–23)
3. Choir "Du bist der Vater": mixed choir (bars 27–79) Ziemlich langsam, gemütlich
4. Aria "Du pflegst das Herz": soprano soloist (bars 80–102) Langsam, mit Gefühl
5. Recitative "Nicht minder ziert": tenor soloist (bars 103–109)
6. Finale "Heil unserm Vater": mixed choir (bars 100–143) Mäßig langsam

Despite it contains already own ideas of the composer, the 6-part cantata looks somewhat archaic with its two recitatives, arias and choir parts. The arias look back to baroque examples, in which a basso continuo instrument accompany the solo-singer. The choir parts – a little in the follow of Michael Haydn – refer with imitation phrases to florid counterpoint.

== Discography ==
There is a single recording of the Festgesang:

- Thomas Kerbl, Chorvereinigung Bruckner 2011, Anton Bruckner Lieder/Magnificat – CD: LIVA 046, 2011

== Sources ==
- August Göllerich, Anton Bruckner. Ein Lebens- und Schaffens-Bild, c. 1922 – posthumous edited by Max Auer by G. Bosse, Regensburg, 1932
- Anton Bruckner – Sämtliche Werke, Band XXII/1: Kantaten und Chorwerke I (1845–1855), Musikwissenschaftlicher Verlag der Internationalen Bruckner-Gesellschaft, Franz Burkhart, Rudolf H. Führer and Leopold Nowak (Editor), Vienna, 1987 (Available on IMSLP: Neue Gesamtausgabe, XXII/1. Kantaten und Chorwerke Teil 1: Nr. 1-5)
- Uwe Harten, Anton Bruckner. Ein Handbuch. Residenz Verlag, Salzburg, 1996. ISBN 3-7017-1030-9
- Cornelis van Zwol, Anton Bruckner 1824–1896 – Leven en werken, uitg. Thoth, Bussum, Netherlands, 2012. ISBN 978-90-6868-590-9
- Crawford Howie, Anton Bruckner - A documentary biography, online revised edition
