= August Silberstein =

Austrian writer

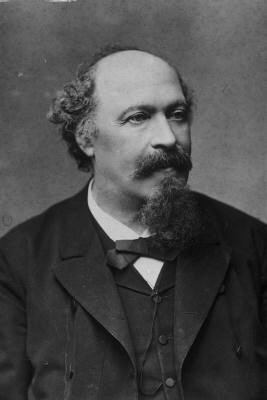
August Silberstein, taken circa 1880

August Karl Silberstein (1 July 1827 – 7 March 1900) was an Austrian writer, born in Buda, Austrian Empire.

== Biography ==
Silberstein was educated at the University of Vienna and supported the 1848 revolts in Austria-Hungary with his articles in the German satire periodical Leuchtkugeln. His articles were banned in the middle of 1851 which forced Silberstein to leave his home.

Impassioned by the country life, he wrote stories of life in villages idealizing the countryside and published popular collections of tales. He was thus called the "Austrian Auerbach". His poems had influence in his lifetime, in particular upon the Austrian poet Peter Rosegger, to whom he was to some extent a mentor. These poems were sometimes put to music by composers such as Strauss (Wenn du ein herzig Liebchen hast of 1879) or Anton Bruckner (Germanenzug of 1864, Vaterlandslied of 1866, and Helgoland of 1893).

== Works ==
- Dorfschwalben aus Österreich (1862-1863)
- Hercules Schwach (1864)
- Land u. Leute im Nasswald (1868)
- Glänzende Bahnen (1874)
- Die Alpenrose von Ischl (1875)
- Deutsche Hochlandsgeschichten (1877)
- Büchlein Klinginsland (1878)
- Denksäulen im Gebiet der Kultur und Litteratur (1878)
- Die Rosenzauberin (1884)
- Hauschronik im Blumen— u. Dichter-Schmuck (1884)
- Frau Sorge (1886)
- Landläufige Geschichten (1886)
- Dorfmusik (1892)

== See also ==
- Revolutions of 1848
- Ferdinand Freiligrath
- Ludwig Kalisch
- Gottfried Kinkel
