= Ludwig Kalisch =

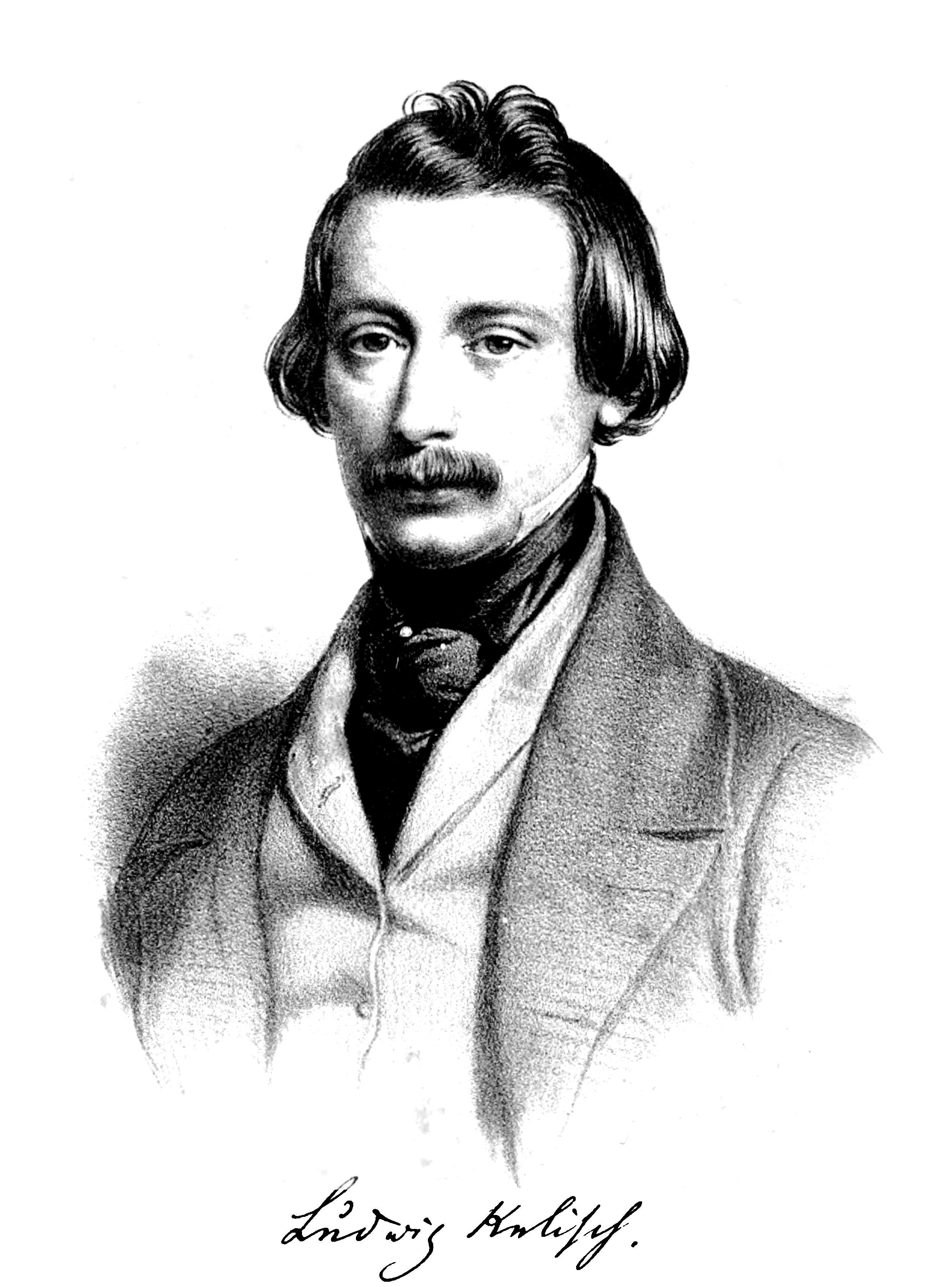
- Born: Ludwig Kalisch; 7 September 1814; Lissa, Prussia
- Died: 3 March 1882 (aged 67); Paris, France
- Occupation: novelist

Ludwig Kalisch (7 September 1814 in Lissa – 3 March 1882 in Paris) was a German-Jewish novelist.

When only twelve years of age he left his home and became successively pedler, merchant, and teacher. He saved enough money to carry him through matriculation and the study of medicine and, later, languages and literature in Heidelberg and Munich. Settling in Mainz in 1843, he became editor of the Narrhalla (1843–46). A participant in the revolution of 1848-49, he was forced to leave Germany. He went to Paris, in 1850 to London, and from 1851 onward lived in Paris.

== Literary works ==
Kalisch's forte was the humorous ballad. Many of his writings appeared in the feuilletons of the newspapers and in magazines.

Of those published separately may be mentioned:

- "Das Buch der Narrheit," Mainz, 1845;
- "Schlagschatten," ib. 1845;
- "Poetische Erzählungen," ib. 1845;
- "Shrapnels," Frankfurt am Main, 1849;
- "Paris und London," ib. 1851;
- "Heitere Stunden," Berlin, 1872;
- "Bilder aus Meiner Knabenzeit," Leipzig, 1872;
- "Gebunden und Ungebunden," Munich, 1876;
- "Pariser Leben," Mainz, 1881, 2d ed. 1882.

== Bibliography of Jewish Encyclopedia ==
- Meyers Konversations-Lexikon

By : Isidore Singer & Frederick T. Haneman
