= Vaterlandslied, WAB 92 =

Song composed by Anton Bruckner

Vaterlandslied
- Secular choral work by Anton Bruckner
- Coat of arms of the Austro-Hungarian Empire
- Key: A-flat major
- Catalogue: WAB 92
- Form: Patriotic song
- Text: August Silberstein
- Language: German
- Composed: November 1866: Linz
- Dedication: Niederösterreichischer Sängerbund
- Published: 1902: Vienna
- Vocal: TTBB choir, tenor and baritone soloists

Vaterlandslied (Patriotic song), WAB 92, is a patriotic song composed by Anton Bruckner during his stay in Linz.

== History ==
Bruckner composed this song on a text of August Silberstein in November 1866, during his stay in Linz. He composed it together with the Vaterländisch Weinlied on request of Anton M. Storch.

Bruckner dedicated the work to the Niederösterreichischer Sängerbund (Singers' association of Lower Austria). The work was performed by the Liedertafel Frohsinn on 4 April 1868 in the Redoutensaal of Linz.

The work, of which the original manuscript is lost, was first issued by Doblinger, Vienna in 1902, together with Der Abendhimmel, WAB 56. It is issued in Band XXIII/2, No. 20 of the Gesamtausgabe.

The quite large-scaled work (13 pages in the Gesamtausgabe) is considered one of the best works for men's choir of the Linz period. The song, which remained in the repertoire of Frohsinn, was also performed at the Bruckner-Feier of 1924.

== Lyrics ==
The song uses lyrics from Trutz-Nachtigall by August Silberstein:

O könnt' ich dich beglücken,
Wie wollt' ich selig sein,
O du mein höchst Entzücken,
Du lieb Vaterland mein!

Willst du mein Leben,
Willst du mein Blut,
Ich will's dir geben,
Gar treu und gut!

Wie sollt' ich dich nicht lieben,
Da du so herrlich bist,
Es lacht ja hier wie drüben
Die Flur zu jeder Frist.

Lockt's mich zu Auen,
Streb' ich zur Höh',
O Reiz zu schauen,
Wohin ich geh!

Du Heimat, Land, voll Klarheit,
Voll edlem Geisteslicht,
Du Land voll edler Wahrheit,
O dich verlass ich nicht.

Ob manche Blüte
Fern gedeiht,
In deinem Gemüte
Die Herrlichkeit!

Wie süß, mit dir zu leben,
Für dich dem Tod sich weih'n,
Mein Geist wird dich umschweben,
Geh' ich zu Ew'gem ein.

O Gott, beschirme
Dies deutsche Blut,
Lenk' es durch Stürme
Zu höchstem Gut.

Translation:

O, if I could make you happy,
How blessed I would be,
You, my highest delight,
You, my dear fatherland!

If you want my life,
If you want my blood,
I will give it to you,
Faithfully and well!

How should I not love you,
While you are so glorious,
Here and there,
Your fields always smile to me.

When I'm decoyed to meadows,
Strive for heights,
Oh charm to see
Wherever I go!

You, homeland, full of clarity,
Full of noble inspiration,
You, land full of noble truth,
I do not leave you.

Even if some blossom
Flourishes far away,
In your mind
What a magnificence!

How sweet to live with you,
To devote myself to death for you,
My spirit will hover over you,
When I will go to eternity.

O God, protect
This German blood,
Guide it through the storms
To the highest good.

== Music ==
The 87-bar long work in A-flat major, scored for TTBB choir and tenor and baritone soloists, is in four sections: A (strophes 1 & 2, 21 bars), A (strophes 3 & 4, 21 bars), B (strophes 5 & 6, 20 bars), A (strophes 7 & 8, 21 bars) with a 4-bar coda.

== Discography ==
There is one recording of the song:

- Reiner E. Moritz, Anton Bruckner - The making of a giant – BR: Arthaus Musik NTSSC, 2021
  A recording of seven motets, and two Weltliche Chorwerke: Du bist wie eine Blume and Vaterlandslied by Alexander Koller with Hard-Chor-Linz and the Linzer Sängerakademie, is together with the documentary.

== Sources ==
- Anton Bruckner – Sämtliche Werke, Band XXIII/2: Weltliche Chorwerke (1843–1893), Musikwissenschaftlicher Verlag der Internationalen Bruckner-Gesellschaft, Angela Pachovsky and Anton Reinthaler (Editor), Vienna, 1989
- Cornelis van Zwol, Anton Bruckner 1824–1896 – Leven en werken, uitg. Thoth, Bussum, Netherlands, 2012. ISBN 978-90-6868-590-9
- Uwe Harten, Anton Bruckner. Ein Handbuch. Residenz Verlag, Salzburg, 1996. ISBN 3-7017-1030-9.
- Crawford Howie, Anton Bruckner - A documentary biography, online revised edition
