= TTBB =

Musical notation

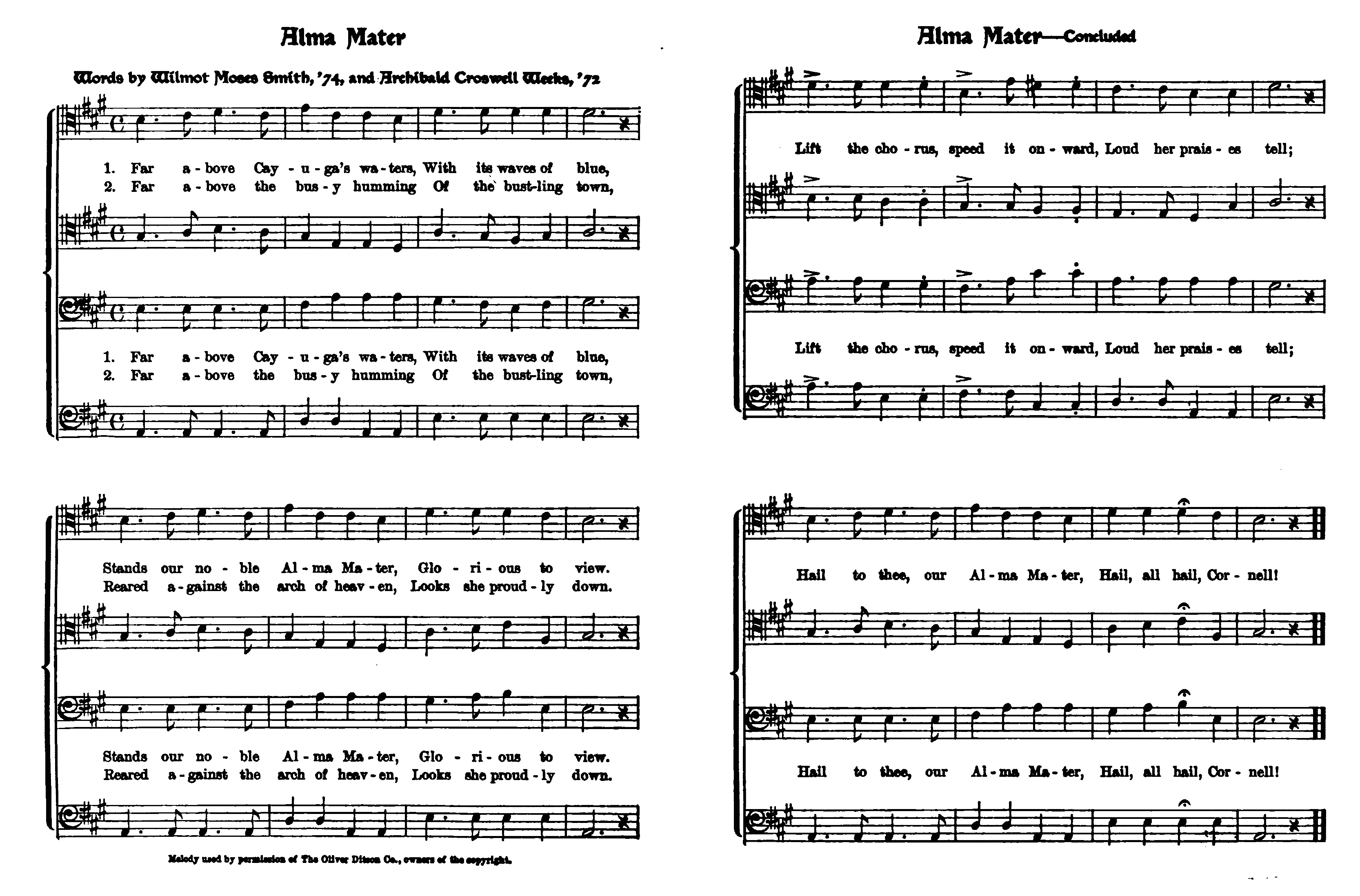
"Far Above Cayuga's Waters" written in a TTBB arrangement.

In choral musical notation, TTBB denotes a four-part lower-voice choir. Composed of tenors and basses, its configuration is Tenor 1, Tenor 2 (or lead), Bass 1 (or Baritone), and Bass 2.

Typically (but not always) one of the Tenor parts is the melody, with the other parts as harmony(s). In music for barbershop quartets, which predominantly use the TTBB arrangement, the 2nd Tenor is almost always the melody.

In musical notation, these four voices are represented across two staves (a "close score") with the orientation of the stems indicating which voice should sing those notes. Tenor 1 and Tenor 2 are notated in the top stave, with Tenor 1 with an upwards stem, and Tenor 2 (the lead melody) with a downward stem. Likewise, Bass 1 and Bass 2 are notated in the lower stave with Bass 1 (baritone) using an upwards stem and Bass 2 using a downwards stem.

The above may not be true for some recently written (composed) music, however writers make it easy to see which part sings their respective pitch. For example, T1 and B1 the highest pitch on each stave. Most of the time, this occurs where T1(B1) and T2(B2) are singing at the same time (in time and in unison).

Sometimes the lead or melody part is sung as a solo, with the choir singing the harmony parts (support or backing vocals).

The Tanunda Liedertafel employs this method of notation in their music.
