= Cantata =

Vocal composition with an instrumental accompaniment

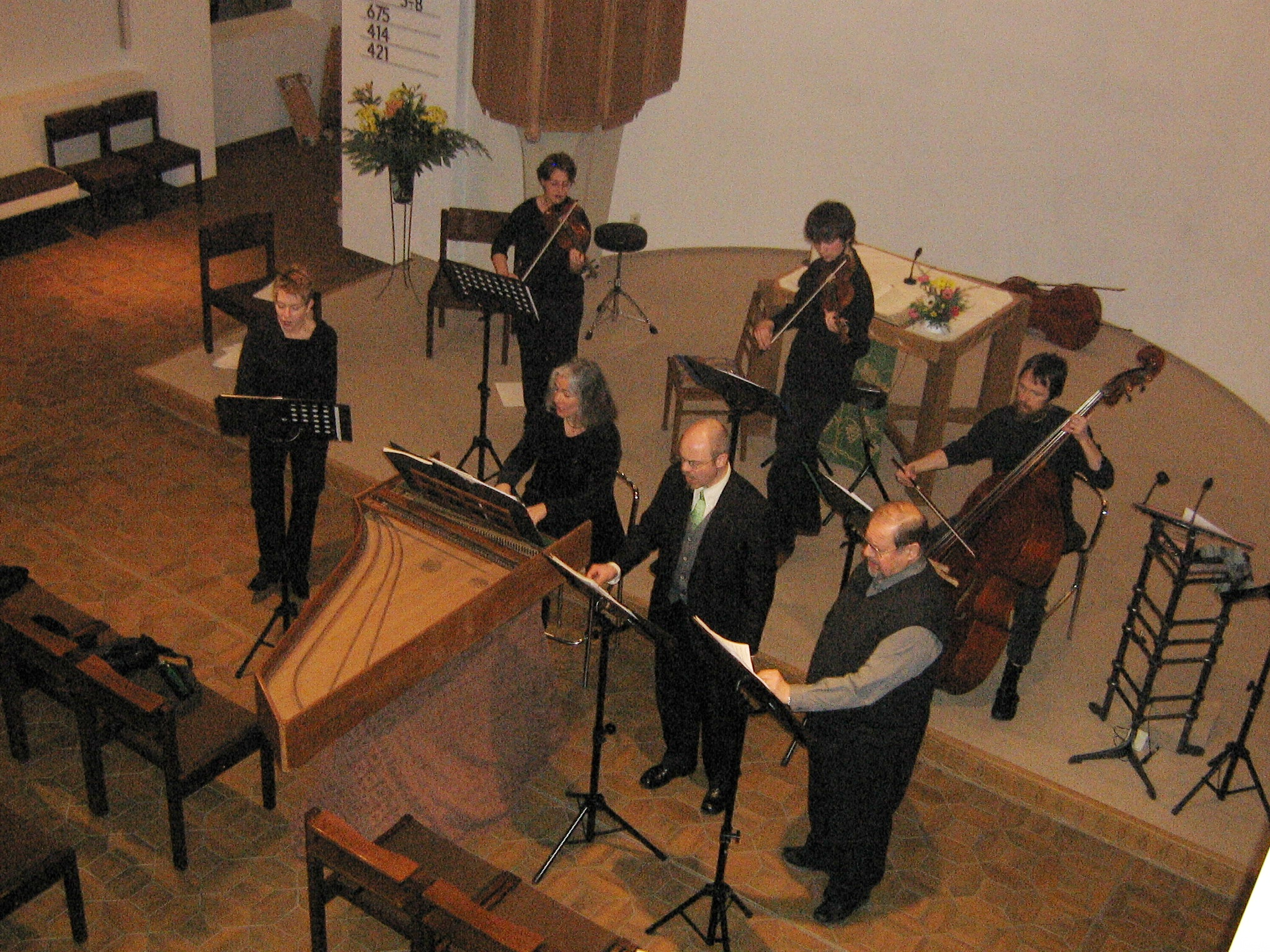
Vocal quartet and strings

A cantata (/kænˈtɑːtə/; Italian: [kanˈtaːta]; literally "sung", past participle feminine singular of the Italian verb cantare, "to sing") is a vocal composition with instrumental accompaniment, typically in several movements.

The meaning of the term changed over time, from the simple single-voice madrigal of the early 17th century to the multi-voice "cantata da camera" and the "cantata da chiesa" of the later part of that century, from the more substantial dramatic forms of the 18th century to the usually sacred-texted 19th-century cantata, which was effectively a type of short oratorio. Cantatas for use in the liturgy of church services are called church cantata or sacred cantatas; other cantatas can be indicated as secular cantatas. Several cantatas were, and still are, written for special occasions, such as Christmas cantatas. Christoph Graupner, Georg Philipp Telemann and Johann Sebastian Bach composed cycles of church cantatas for the occasions of the liturgical year.

== Historical context ==
The term originated in the early 17th century, simultaneously with opera and oratorio. Prior to that, all "cultured" music was vocal. With the rise of instrumental music, the term appeared, while instrumental art became sufficiently developed to be embodied in sonatas. From the beginning of the 17th century until late in the 18th, the cantata for one or two solo voices with accompaniment of basso continuo (and perhaps a few solo instruments) was a principal form of Italian vocal chamber music.

A cantata consisted first of a declamatory narrative or scene in recitative, held together by a primitive aria repeated at intervals. Fine examples may be found in the church music of Giacomo Carissimi; and the English vocal solos of Henry Purcell (such as Mad Tom and Mad Bess) show the utmost that can be made of this archaic form. With the rise of the da capo aria, the cantata became a group of two or three arias joined by recitative. George Frideric Handel's numerous Italian duets and trios are examples on a rather large scale. His Latin motet Silete Venti, for soprano solo, shows the use of this form in church music.

== Differences from other musical forms ==
Wo ist doch mein Freund geblieben, BuxWV 111
A sacred cantata by Dieterich Buxtehude

10. Chorale: Jesus bleibet meine Freude
From the cantata Herz und Mund und Tat und Leben, BWV 147 by Johann Sebastian Bach (Orchestra Gli Armonici)

The Italian solo cantata tended, when on a large scale, to become indistinguishable from a scene in an opera, in the same way the church cantata, solo or choral, is indistinguishable from a small oratorio or portion of an oratorio. This is equally evident whether one examines the church cantatas of Bach, of which nearly 200 are extant (see List of Bach cantatas) or the Chandos Anthems of Handel. In Johann Sebastian Bach's case, some of the larger cantatas are actually called oratorios, and the Christmas Oratorio is a collection of six church cantatas actually intended for performance on six different days, though together they form as complete an artistic whole as any classical oratorio.

== Baroque ==
During the baroque era, the term "cantata" generally retained its original Italian usage to describe a secular vocal piece of extended length, often in different sections, and usually Italianate in style. At the same time, vocal pieces of similar scope, often with several singers, and various instruments, were in great demand for the services of the Lutheran church. Such pieces were usually called geistliche Konzerte (singular: geistliches Konzert, meaning sacred concerto). Many of these pieces were simply called by their opening text. Such pieces for the liturgy or other occasions were not only composed by Bach but also by Dieterich Buxtehude, Christoph Graupner, Gottfried Heinrich Stölzel and Georg Philipp Telemann, to name a few. The editors of the Bach Gesellschaft adopted "sacred cantata" as a convenient catchall for most of Bach's liturgical pieces. The term was then retroactively applied by Philipp Spitta to refer to comparable works by composers from Heinrich Schütz onwards. Many secular cantatas were composed for events in the nobility. They were so similar in form to the sacred ones that many of them were parodied (in parts or completely) to sacred cantatas, for example in Bach's Christmas Oratorio.

=== Bach cantatas ===
Johann Sebastian Bach, almost 200 of whose cantatas survive, is a notable contributor to the genre.

His cantatas are usually written for a baroque orchestra consisting of a string section, an oboe section, and a continuo group. Timpani and brass were sometimes added on festive occasions such as Christmas or Easter. The vocal forces consisted of a four-part choir and soloists. Bach also wrote some cantatas for only one solo singer (ex. BWV 51).

A handful of his cantatas, such as Tritt auf die Glaubensbahn, BWV 152 (1714), were written as dialogue cantatas. These cantatas represented interactions between two parties, mostly between Jesus, played by a bass, and the Soul, played by a soprano.

=== Graupner's cantatas ===
Christoph Graupner was Hofkapellmeister at the court of Hesse-Darmstadt and provided over 1,400 cantatas during his nearly 50 years of employment there, making him the most significant contributor to the genre. While only a handful of Bach's cantatas contain accompanied chorales (the vocal parts are usually doubled by the instrumental parts), nearly all of Graupner's chorales feature elaborate ritornello sections. This is possibly because Bach's Leipzig congregation was expected to sing along with them, but the Darmstadt court was not. Also, many of Graupner's cantatas exploit elaborate orchestral effects and use exotic instrumentation, such as chalumeau, flûte d'amour, oboe d'amore, viola d'amore, trumpets, horns and timpani. See: List of cantatas by Christoph Graupner.

== Classical and romantic period ==
The term "cantata" came to be applied almost exclusively to choral works, as distinguished from solo vocal music. In early 19th-century cantatas, the chorus is the vehicle for music more lyric and songlike than in oratorio, not excluding the possibility of a brilliant climax in a fugue as in Ludwig van Beethoven's Der glorreiche Augenblick, Carl Maria von Weber's Jubel-Kantate, and Felix Mendelssohn's Die erste Walpurgisnacht. Anton Bruckner composed several Name-day cantatas, a Festive Cantata and two secular cantatas (Germanenzug and Helgoland). Bruckner's Psalm 146 is also in cantata form. Mendelssohn's Symphony Cantata, the Lobgesang, is a hybrid work, partly in the oratorio style. It is preceded by three symphonic movements, a device avowedly suggested by Beethoven's Ninth Symphony; but the analogy is not accurate, as Beethoven's work is a symphony of which the fourth movement is a choral finale of essentially single design, whereas Mendelssohn's Symphony Cantata is a cantata with three symphonic preludes. The full lyric possibilities of a string of choral songs were realized by Johannes Brahms in his Rinaldo, which, like the Walpurgisnacht—was set to a text by Goethe. Other cantatas, Beethoven's Meeresstille, works of Brahms and many notable small English choral works, such as cantatas of John Henry Maunder and John Stanley, find various ways to set poetry to choral music. The competition for the French Prix de Rome requires that each candidate submit a cantata. Hector Berlioz failed in three attempts before finally winning in 1830 with Sardanapale. While almost all of the Prix de Rome cantatas have long since been forgotten (along with their composers, for the most part), Debussy's prize-winning L'enfant prodigue (1884, following his unsuccessful Le gladiateur of 1883) is still performed occasionally today. Late in the century, Gustav Mahler wrote his early Das klagende Lied on his own words between 1878 and 1880, and Samuel Coleridge-Taylor created a successful trilogy of cantatas, The Song of Hiawatha between 1898 and 1900.

== Twentieth century and beyond ==
Cantatas, both of the chamber variety and on a grand scale, were composed after 1900 as well. Indeed, it would not be an exaggeration to claim that one of the most popular pieces of classical music of the 20th century to the layman's ears, is a cantata, namely Carmina Burana (1935–1936) by the German composer Carl Orff.

In the early part of the century, secular cantatas once again became prominent, while the 19th-century tradition of sacred cantatas also continued. Ralph Vaughan Williams composed both kinds: "festival" cantatas such as Toward the Unknown Region (1907), Five Mystical Songs (1911), and Five Tudor Portraits (1936), and sacred cantatas including Sancta civitas (1926), Benedicite (1930), Dona nobis pacem (1936), and Hodie (1954). Joseph Ryelandt also composed secular and sacred cantatas, such as Le chant de la pauvreté Op. 92 in 1928 and Veni creator Op. 123 in 1938. Béla Bartók composed the secular Cantata Profana, subtitled "The Nine Splendid Stags" and based on a Romanian folk tale, in 1930. Although it began as a song cycle (as reflected also by its title), Arnold Schoenberg's Gurre-Lieder (1900–1903/1910–11) evolved into one of the century's largest secular cantatas. Paul Hindemith composed three works he designated as cantatas: Die Serenaden, Op. 35, for soprano, oboe, viola, and cello (1924), Mahnung an die Jugend, sich der Musik zu befleissigen (from the Plöner Musiktage, 1932), and Ite angeli veloces for alto and tenor, mixed chorus, and orchestra, with audience participation (1953–55). Of Anton Webern's last three compositions, two are secular cantatas: Cantata No. 1, Op. 29 (1938–39), and Cantata No. 2, Op. 31 (1941–43), both setting texts by Hildegard Jone. Webern had begun sketching a Third Cantata by the time he was killed in 1945. Ernst Krenek also composed two examples: a "scenic cantata", Die Zwingburg, Op. 14 (1922), and a Cantata for Wartime, Op. 95, for women's voices and orchestra (1943). Sergei Prokofiev composed Semero ikh (1917–18; rev. 1933), and in 1939 premiered a cantata drawn from the film music for Alexander Nevsky. He wrote two festival cantatas, the Cantata for the Twentieth Anniversary of the October Revolution, Op. 74, and Flourish, Mighty Homeland, Op. 114, for the thirtieth anniversary of the same event

Patriotic cantatas celebrating anniversaries of events in the Revolution or extolling state leaders were frequently commissioned in the Soviet Union between 1930 and the middle of the century, though these occasional works were seldom among their composers' best. Examples include Dmitri Shostakovich's Poem of the Motherland, Op. 74 (1947) and The Sun Shines over Our Motherland, Op. 90 (1952), and three works by Prokofiev, Zdravitsa! [Hail to Stalin] (1939). Dmitry Kabalevsky also composed four such cantatas, The Great Homeland, Op. 35 (1941–42), The Song of Morning, Spring and Peace, Op. 57 (1957–58), Leninists, Op. 63 (1959), and About Our Native Land, Op. 82 (1965).

Patriotic cantatas were also created in China during the civil war and the Second Sino-Japanese War. For example, the Yellow River Cantata was composed in 1939.

In 1940, the Brazilian composer Heitor Villa-Lobos created a secular cantata titled Mandu çarará, based on an Indian legend collected by Barbosa Rodrigues. Francis Poulenc composed in 1943 Figure humaine, FP 120, a cantata for double mixed choir of 12 voices on poems by Paul Éluard. Igor Stravinsky composed a work titled simply Cantata in 1951–52, which used stanzas from the 15th-century "Lyke-wake Dirge" as a narrative frame for other anonymous English lyrics, and later designated A Sermon, a Narrative and a Prayer (1961) as "a cantata for alto and tenor soli, speaker, chorus, and orchestra". Luigi Nono wrote Il canto sospeso in 1955–56. Hans Werner Henze composed a Cantata della fiaba estrema and Novae de infinito laudes (both in 1963), as well as a number of other works that might be regarded as cantatas, such as Kammermusik (1958, rev. 1963), Muzen Siziliens (1966), and El Cimarrón (1969–70). Momente (1962–64/1969), one of the most important works of Karlheinz Stockhausen, is often described as a cantata. Benjamin Britten composed at least six works he designated as cantatas: The Company of Heaven (1937), Rejoice in the Lamb, Op. 30 (1943), Saint Nicolas, Op. 42 (1949), the Cantata academica, Op. 62 (1959), the Cantata Misericordium, Op. 69 (1963), and Phaedra, Op. 93 (1975). Alberto Ginastera also composed three works in this form: the Cantata para América Mágica, Op. 27 (1960), Bomarzo, Op. 32 (1964), and Milena, Op. 37 (1971), and Gottfried von Einem composed in 1973 An die Nachgeborenen based on diverse texts, the title taken from a poem of Bertolt Brecht. Mikis Theodorakis composed the cantatas According to the Sadducees and Canto Olympico. Herbert Blendinger's Media in vita was premiered in 1980, his Mich ruft zuweilen eine Stille (Sometimes a silence calls me) in (1992), and Allein den Betern kann es noch gelingen (It can only be achieved by those who pray) in 1995. Iván Erőd wrote in 1988/89) Vox Lucis (Voice of the Light), Op. 56. Ivan Moody wrote in 1995 Revelation.

Cantatas were also composed by Mark Alburger, Erik Bergman, Dave Brubeck, Carlos Chávez, Osvald Chlubna, Peter Maxwell Davies, Norman Dello Joio, Lukas Foss, Roy Harris, Arthur Honegger, Alan Hovhaness, Dmitry Kabalevsky, Libby Larsen, Jón Leifs, Peter Mennin, Dimitri Nicolau, Krzysztof Penderecki, Allan Pettersson, Daniel Pinkham, Earl Robinson, Ned Rorem, William Schuman (A Free Song), Roger Sessions, Siegfried Strohbach, Michael Tippett, Kurt Weill, Jörg Widmann (Friedenskantate, Cantata in tempore belli) and Jan Ryant Dřízal (Christmas Cantata).
