= Brucknerfest =

German music festival

The International Brucknerfest Linz is an annual series of music events held in Linz.

The music event series is named after Anton Bruckner and is organised by the Brucknerhaus. The Brucknerfest was introduced in 1974 on the initiative of the artistic director of the Brucknerhaus Horst Stadlmayr and started with an orchestral concert under Herbert von Karajan. Since 1977, the Bruckner Festival has been a fixed component of Austrian cultural events alongside the Vienna Festival and the Salzburg Festival.

In 2005, the festival took place from 11 September to 2 October. The keynote speaker was Anton Zeilinger. The Bruckner Orchestra Linz played Bruckner's 9th Symphony under the direction of Dennis Russell Davies. Furthermore, the Vienna Philharmonic under Pierre Boulez Bruckner's 7th Symphony, and the Staatskapelle Dresden played Bruckner's 4th Symphony under the conduct of Muyng-Whun Chung. Furthermore, the Orchestre Philharmonique de Monte-Carlo (conductor Marek Janowski), the MDR Symphony Orchestra and the MDR Radio Choir Leipzig (conductor Fabio Luisi) performed the Mass in F minor. The Royal Philharmonic Orchestra played under the baton of Dirk Joeres, the Camerata Salzburg under the baton of Christian Muthspiel. The Ensemble Thomas Christian could also be heard and seen, and the cellist Mischa Maisky was accompanied by his daughter Lily on the piano. Furthermore, Die Walküre could be heard with Christian Franz (Siegmund), Eva Johannson (Sieglinde), Gabriele Schnaut (Brünnhilde) and Gerd Grochowski (Wotan) under the direction of Dennis Russell Davies.

In 2009, the Brucknerfest took place from 13 September to 5 October. The Bruckner Orchestra Linz opened the series of events with a performance of Haydn's the Creation conducted by Dennis Russell Davies.

In 2010, it took place from 12 September to 5 October. Traditionally, the Bruckner Orchester Linz conducted by Dennis Russell Davies opened with Beethoven's Concerto for Piano and Orchestra No. 3 in C minor and Bruckner's 7th Symphony.

2011: 11 September to 7 October - Daniel Harding conducted the Filarmonica de la Scala and presented Sibelius' Concerto for Violin and Orchestra in D minor and Bernstein's Overture to "Candide" as well as Dvořák's Symphony No. 9.

In 2012, the Brucknerhaus presented the Brucknerfest from 9 September to 5 October. For the opening, Dennis Russell Davies conducted the Bruckner Orchestra Linz with Gustav Mahler's Symphony No. 3 in D minor. A broad spectrum from Angelika Kirchschlager to Rudolf Buchbinder and Silje Nergaard once again made the Brucknerfest 2012 the festival event of the year.

In 2017, under the slogan "Bruckner elementar", a major cooperation with Valery Gergiev and the Münchner Philharmoniker started. By 2019, Bruckner's Symphonies No. 1 to No. 9 will be recorded on DVD and CD at the St. Florian Monastery and released on the Munich Philharmonic's in-house label MPHIL.

In 2018, the Brucknerfest was dedicated to tradition. Under the motto "Was du ererbt von deinen Vätern - Bruckner und die Tradition" (What you inherit from your fathers - Bruckner and tradition), more than 30 events took place from 4 September (Bruckner's birthday) to 11 October 2018 (the anniversary of Bruckner's death) in the Brucknerhaus Linz and four other places where Bruckner worked: Linz Mariendom, Alter Dom, Pfarrkirche Ansfelden and St. Florian Monastery.

In 2019, the Brucknerfest Linz was held under the motto "New Worlds - Bruckner and the Symphony" and, as in the previous year, and took place from 4 September to 11 October. Among the performing artists were András Schiff, Cameron Carpenter, Neeme Järvi, Eliahu Inbal, Nobuko Imai, Piotr Beczała, Thomas Hampson as well as the Bruckner Orchestra Linz under Markus Poschner. In addition, the last two concerts of the Bruckner cycle by Valery Gergiev and the Münchner Philharmoniker, which began in 2017, took place in the St. Florian Abbey Basilica.

In 2020, the theme of the festival was "Controversy - Bruckner and his Contemporaries". Artists such as Mauro Peter, Thomas Quasthoff, Howard Griffiths, Antonio Pappano and Christoph von Dohnányi performed at the Brucknerhaus Linz and several other venues from 4 September to 11 October.

In 2021, the theme of the Bruckner Festival was "Courageous Impulses - Bruckner and his students". Musical performances were given by Michail Jurowski, Waltraud Meier, Günther Groissböck, Jakub Hrůša and the Bamberg Symphony Orchestra, Marin Alsop, Thomas Hampson (including master class) and Hartmut Haenchen.

Under the title "Visions - Bruckner and the Modern Age", the Brucknerfest 2022 took a look at the legacy of the Austrian composer. Artists such as Christian Thielemann with the Staatskapelle Dresden, Franz Welser-Möst on the podium of the Cleveland Orchestra, Vasily Petrenko with the Royal Philharmonic Orchestra, Martha Argerich and Lilya Zilberstein, Alexander Melnikov and the Bruckner Orchestra Linz conducted by Markus Poschner provided the audience with true concert highlights.

== Speakers ==
- 1977: Friedrich Heer
- 1978: Gerhard Klingenberg
- 1979: Werner Hofmann
- 1980: Ernst Krenek
- 1981: Anton Neumayr
- 1982: Rolf Liebermann
- 1983: Fritz Hochwälder
- 1984: Erwin Ringel
- 1985: Werner Schneyder
- 1986: Hilmar Hoffmann
- 1987: Erich Fried
- 1988: Milo Dor
- 1989: Eric J. Hobsbawm
- 1990: Franz König
- 1991: Axel Corti
- 1992: Franz Welser-Möst
- 1993: Eduard Goldstücker
- 1994: Peter Turrini
- 1995: Erika Weinzierl
- 1996: Klaus Maria Brandauer
- 1997: Hildegard Hamm-Brücher
- 1998: Horst-Eberhard Richter
- 1999: Erika Pluhar
- 2000: Karlheinz Böhm
- 2001: Theo Sommer
- 2002: SAID
- 2003: Peter Huemer
- 2004: Anna Mitgutsch
- 2005: Anton Zeilinger
- 2006: Ari Rath
- 2007: Konrad Paul Liessmann
- 2008: Renan Demirkan
- 2009: Robert Menasse
- 2010: Elfriede Hammerl
- 2011: Ludwig Adamovich Jr.
- 2012: Armin Thurnher
- 2013: Ruth Wodak
- 2014: Paul Lendvai
- 2015: Iris Berben
- 2016: Senta Berger
- 2017: Harald Krassnitzer
- 2018: Daniel Kehlmann
- 2019: Wolf D. Prix
- 2020: Waris Dirie
- 2021: Heinz Fischer
- 2022: Jean Ziegler
