= Um Mitternacht, WAB 90 =

1886 song composed by Anton Bruckner

Um Mitternacht
- Secular choral work by Anton Bruckner
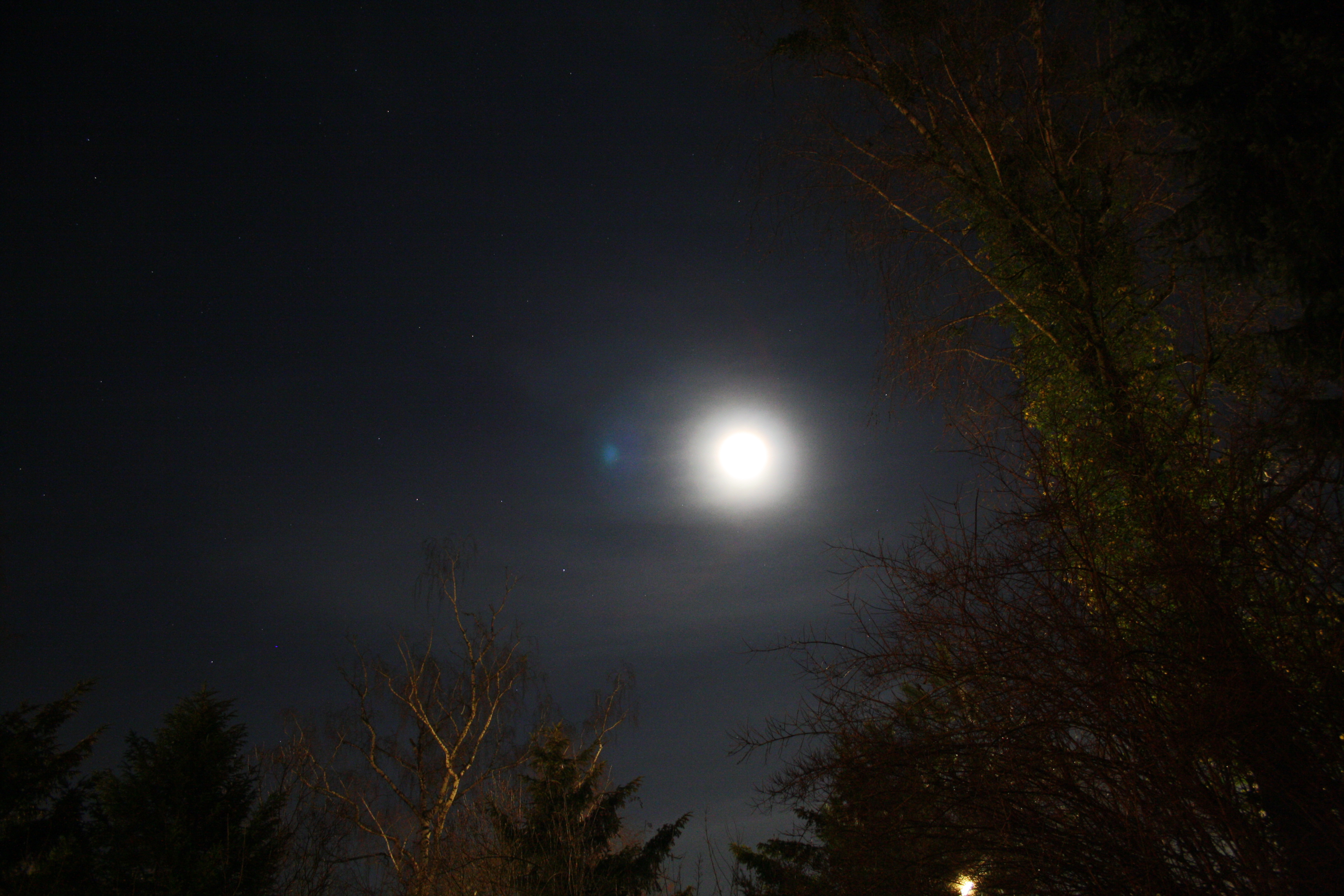
- Moon light in the Saint Sylvester's night
- Key: F minor
- Catalogue: WAB 90
- Text: Robert Prutz
- Language: German
- Composed: 11 February 1886: Vienna
- Dedication: Strassburger Männer-Sangverein
- Published: 1911: Vienna
- Vocal: TTBB choir and tenor soloist

Um Mitternacht (At midnight), WAB 90, is a song composed by Anton Bruckner in 1886 on a text of Robert Prutz. About twenty years earlier Bruckner had already composed a song on the same text.

== History ==
Bruckner composed the song on a text of Robert Prutz on 11 February 1886, for the Strassburger Männer-Sangverein (Men's singing association of Strasbourg). The piece was performed on 15 April 1886 by the Liedertafel Frohsinn in the Städischer Volksgartensalon. Because of performance difficulties (humming voices and many modulations), the choir was enhanced by a harp.

The work, of which the original manuscript is stored in the Österreichische Nationalbibliothek, was issued in the same year by the Strassburger Sängerhaus, and thereafter (1911) by Viktor Keldorfer (Universal Edition), together with the other setting (Um Mitternacht, WAB 89) and the other "midnight-song" Mitternacht, WAB 80. It is issued in Band XXIII/2, No. 33 of the Gesamtausgabe.

== Music ==
The song is using the text by Robert Prutz, which Bruckner had already used for Um Mitternacht, WAB 89.

The 93-bar long work in F minor is scored for TTBB choir and tenor soloist. Strophe 1 is sung by the choir. Strophe 2 (In süßen unbelauschten Tränen, bar 31) and strophe 3 are sung by the tenor soloist with accompaniment of humming voices. Strophe 4 (So tönet oft das stille Läuten, bar 58) is sung by the choir.

== Discography ==
Um Mitternacht, WAB 90, is less popular than the previous setting WAB 89. A selection among the few recordings:

- Guido Mancusi, Chorus Viennensis, Herbert Lippert (tenor), Musik, du himmlisches Gebilde! – CD: ORF CD 73, 1995
- Thomas Kerbl, Männerchorvereinigung, Weltliche Männerchöre – CD: LIVA054, 2012

== Sources ==
- Anton Bruckner – Sämtliche Werke, Band XXIII/2: Weltliche Chorwerke (1843–1893), Musikwissenschaftlicher Verlag der Internationalen Bruckner-Gesellschaft, Angela Pachovsky and Anton Reinthaler (Editor), Vienna, 1989
- Cornelis van Zwol, Anton Bruckner 1824–1896 – Leven en werken, uitg. Thoth, Bussum, Netherlands, 2012. ISBN 978-90-6868-590-9
- Uwe Harten, Anton Bruckner. Ein Handbuch. Residenz Verlag, Salzburg, 1996. ISBN 3-7017-1030-9.
