= Um Mitternacht, WAB 89 =

1864 song composed by Anton Bruckner

Um Mitternacht
- Secular choral work by Anton Bruckner
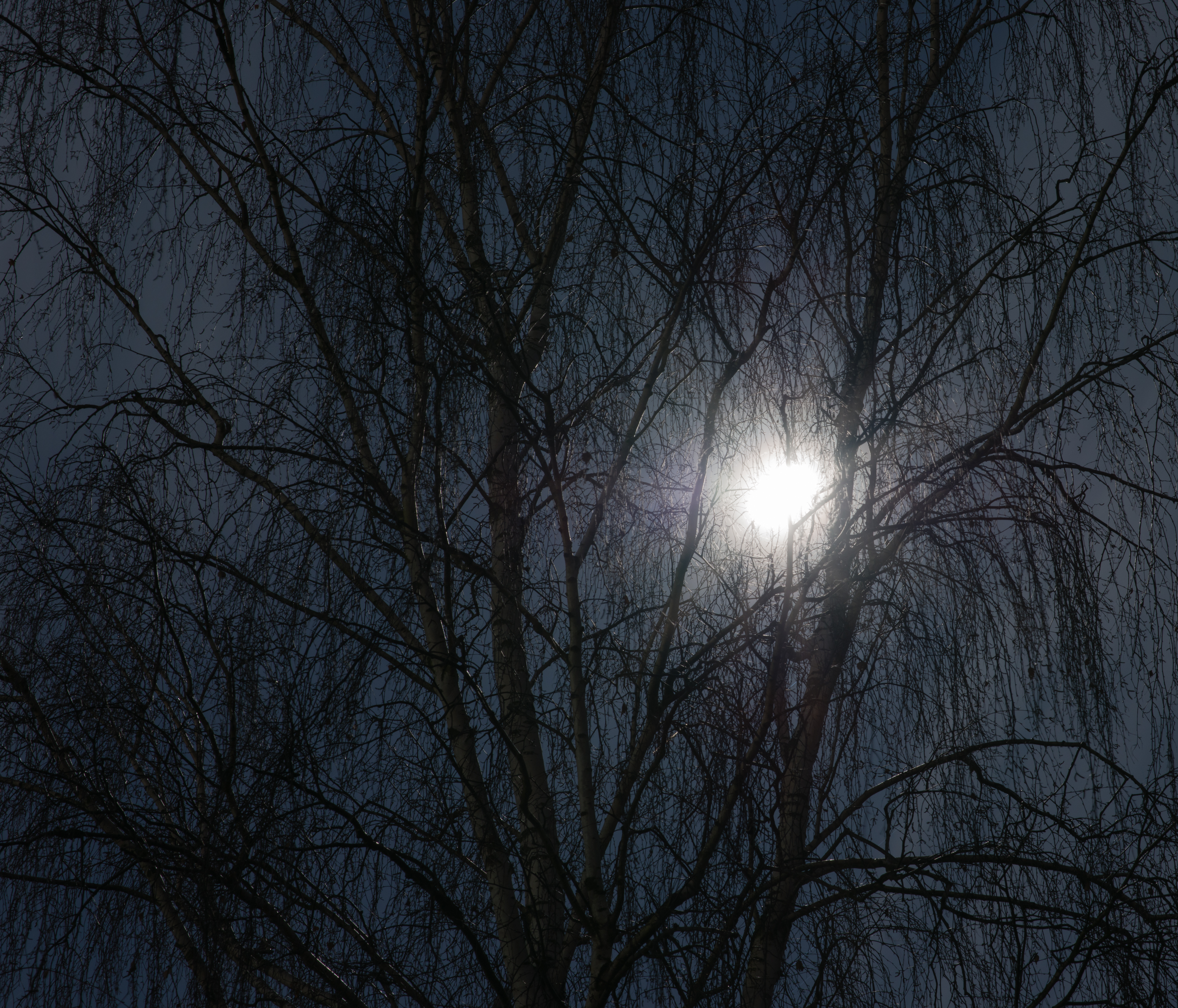
- Key: F minor
- Catalogue: WAB 89
- Text: Robert Prutz
- Language: German
- Composed: 12 April 1864: Linz
- Dedication: Liedertafel Sängerbund
- Published: 1911: Vienna
- Vocal: TTBB choir and alto soloist
- Instrumental: Piano

Um Mitternacht (At midnight), WAB 89, is a song composed by Anton Bruckner in 1864.

== History ==
Bruckner composed the song on a text of Robert Prutz on 12 April 1864, for the Linz Liedertafel Sängerbund (the rival of Liedertafel Frohsinn). The piece was performed on 11 December 1864 by Sängerbund in the Redoutensaal under Bruckner's baton. The work, of which the original manuscript is stored in the Österreichische Nationalbibliothek, was first issued by Viktor Keldorfer (Universal Edition) in 1911, together with the other setting (Um Mitternacht, WAB 90) and the other "midnight-song" Mitternacht, WAB 80. It is issued in Band XXIII/2, No. 17 of the Gesamtausgabe.

== Text ==
Um Mitternacht uses a text by Robert Prutz.

Um Mitternacht, in ernster Stunde,
Tönt oft ein wundersamer Klang.
’s ist wie aus liebem Muttermunde
Ein freundlich tröstender Gesang.

In süßen, unbelauschten Tränen
Löst er des Herzens bange Pein,
Und alles unmutvolle Sehnen
Und allen Kummer wiegt er ein.

Als käm’ der Mai des Lebens wieder,
Regt sich’s im Herzen wunderbar:
Da quillen Töne, keimen Lieder,
Da wird die Seele jung und klar.

So tönet oft das stille Läuten,
Doch ich versteh’ die Weise nie,
Und nur mitunter möcht’ ich’s deuten,
Als wär’s der Kindheit Melodie.

At midnight, in the grave hour,
Sounds often a wondrous tone.
It is like from mother's dear mouth
A friendly consoling song.

In sweet, unheard tears
It loosens the heart's anxious pain,
And all discouraged longing
And all sorrow are cradled.

As if the May of life returned,
The heart delightfully beats:
Then sounds flow, songs sprout,
The soul becomes young and pure.

So sounds often the silent ringing,
But I never understand the tune,
And only sometimes I might interpret,
As if it were the melody of childhood.

== Music ==
The 56-bar long work in F minor is scored for TTBB choir, alto soloist and piano. In strophe 1 the F-minor key forms the mystic background, from which the men's choir, accompanied by pedal points and unison lines of the piano, emerges in open fifths. Strophes 2 and 3 are sung by the alto soloist with accompaniment of the choir. In strophe 4 the melody of strophe 1 is sung again by the choir and the soloist. Bars 14-16 (end of strophe 1) and 27-34 (strophe 3) are sung a cappella. The song is ending pianissimo with the piano alone.

In the first issue of 1911, Keldorfer wrote "Das Zaubrische der Mondscheinpoesie scheint Bruckners sensibele Natur ganz besonders gefangen genommen zu haben. Im Bann solch traumhaft mystischer Stimmungen schuf er drei 'Mitternachts-Chöre'." (The enchantment of the poetry of the moonlight has apparently captivated fully Bruckners sensible nature. In the ban of such dreamily mystic feelings he composed three 'midnight-choirs').

== Discography ==
Um Mitternacht, WAB 89, is one of the most popular Bruckner's Weltliche Chorwerke. The first recording of Um Mitternacht, WAB 89, was by Robert Kühbacher with the Wiener Sängerknaben and Robert Kühbacher (Piano) in 1955 – LP: Philips N 00726 R

A selection of the about 10 other recordings:

- Hubert Günther, Ingrid Günther (alto), Männergesangverein Concordia Hamm, Willy Nölling (piano), Musik im Schloss – LP: Garnet G 40 107, c. 1976
- Guido Mancusi, Julia Bernheimer (alto), Chorus Viennensis, Walter Lochmann (piano), Musik, du himmlisches Gebilde! – CD: ORF CD 73, 1995
- Thomas Kerbl, Katrin Wundsam (alto), Männerchorvereinigung Bruckner 08, Mariko Onishi (piano), Anton Bruckner – Männerchöre – CD: LIVA027, 2008
- Jan Schumacher, Alison Browner (mezzo-soprano), Camerata Musica Limburg, Andreas Frese (piano) Serenade. Songs of night and love – CD: Genuin GEN 12224, 2011
- Markus Stumpner, Erinnerung - Bruckner in St. Florian, Sankt Florianer Sängerknaben – CD : Solo Musica SM 450, 2024

== Sources ==
- Anton Bruckner – Sämtliche Werke, Band XXIII/2: Weltliche Chorwerke (1843–1893), Musikwissenschaftlicher Verlag der Internationalen Bruckner-Gesellschaft, Angela Pachovsky and Anton Reinthaler (Editor), Vienna, 1989
- Cornelis van Zwol, Anton Bruckner 1824–1896 – Leven en werken, uitg. Thoth, Bussum, Netherlands, 2012. ISBN 978-90-6868-590-9
- Uwe Harten, Anton Bruckner. Ein Handbuch. Residenz Verlag, Salzburg, 1996. ISBN 3-7017-1030-9.
- Crawford Howie, Anton Bruckner - A documentary biography, online revised edition
