= Mitternacht, WAB 80 =

1869 song composed by Anton Bruckner

Mitternacht
- Secular choral work by Anton Bruckner
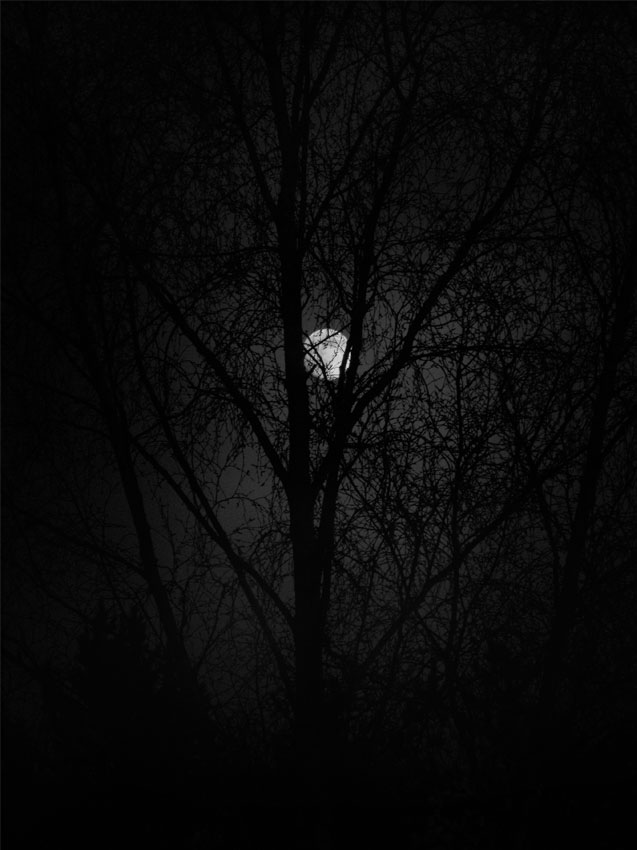
- Key: A♭ major
- Catalogue: WAB 80
- Text: Joseph Mendelssohn
- Language: German
- Composed: November 1869: Vienna
- Dedication: Liedertafel Frohsinn
- Published: 1911: Vienna
- Vocal: TTBB choir and tenor soloist
- Instrumental: Piano

Mitternacht (Midnight), WAB 80, is a song composed by Anton Bruckner in 1869.

== History ==
Bruckner composed the song on a text of Joseph Mendelssohn in November 1869, for the 25th anniversary of Linz Liedertafel Frohsinn. The piece was performed on 15 May 1870 by Frohsinn in the Volksfesthalle in Linz.

The work, of which the original manuscript is stored in the archive of Liedertafel Frohsinn, was first issued by Doblinger in 1903. It was reissued in 1911 by Viktor Keldorfer (Universal Edition), together with the two other Bruckner's "midnight-songs" (Um Mitternacht, WAB 89 and WAB 90). The song is issued in Band XXIII/2, No. 25 of the Gesamtausgabe.

== Text ==
Mitternacht uses a text by Joseph Mendelssohn.

Die Blumen glüh’n im Mondenlicht
Der märchenschönen Mitternacht,
Im Baume unten, blütendicht,
Der Sterne Glanz sich flimmernd bricht,
Sie kosen mit der Blätterpracht
Im süßen Zauber der Mitternacht.

Die Lüfte geh’n so weich, so hehr
Wie ferner Dome Glockenklang;
Mir ist das Herz so andachtschwer,
Es rauscht um mich wie Gotteslehr’,
Wie Orgelton und Feiersang
Im süßen Zauber der Mitternacht.

The flowers glow in the moonlight
Of the fairy and beautiful midnight,
In the tree below, with dense flowers,
The stars' sparkle breaks flickering,
They embrace the finery of the leaves
In the sweet enchantment of midnight.

The air go so softly, so high
Like the sound of the bells of distant cathedrals;
My heart is heavy in devotion,
It rustles around me like Gods teaching,
Like organ sound and festive song
In the sweet enchantment of midnight.

== Music ==
The 84-bar long work in A♭ major is scored for TTBB choir, tenor soloist and pianoforte. Strophe 1 is sung by the choir with an ostinato played on the keyboard. In strophe 2, bars 49-58 (Mir ist das Herz so andachtschwer), the soloist sings with the accompaniment of the choir and unison lines of sixteenth notes in the pianoforte part. The piece ends pianissimo.

== Discography ==
Mitternacht, WAB 80, is one of the most popular Bruckner's Weltliche Chorwerke. The first recording of Mitternacht was by Willi Schell with the Cronenberger Männerchor in 1956 – 45 rpm: Tonstudio Wolfgang Jakob (Dortmund)

A selection of the other recordings:

- Walther Schneider, Josef Traxel (tenor), Stuttgarter Liederkranz, Hubert Giesen (piano) – LP: Odeon O/STO 41453, 1961
- Guido Mancusi, Herbert Lippert (tenor), Chorus Viennensis, Walter Lochmann (piano), Musik, du himmlisches Gebilde! – CD: ORF CD 73, 1995
- Thomas Kerbl, Männerchorvereinigung Bruckner 08, Mariko Onishi (Piano), Anton Bruckner – Männerchöre – CD: LIVA027, 2008
- Jan Schumacher, Christoph Prégardien (tenor), Camerata Musica Limburg, Andreas Frese (Piano) Serenade. Songs of night and love – CD: Genuin GEN 12224, 2011

== Sources ==
- Anton Bruckner – Sämtliche Werke, Band XXIII/2: Weltliche Chorwerke (1843–1893), Musikwissenschaftlicher Verlag der Internationalen Bruckner-Gesellschaft, Angela Pachovsky and Anton Reinthaler (Editor), Vienna, 1989
- Cornelis van Zwol, Anton Bruckner 1824–1896 – Leven en werken, uitg. Thoth, Bussum, Netherlands, 2012. ISBN 978-90-6868-590-9
- Uwe Harten, Anton Bruckner. Ein Handbuch. Residenz Verlag, Salzburg, 1996. ISBN 3-7017-1030-9.
- Crawford Howie, Anton Bruckner - A documentary biography, online revised edition
