= Heinrich Roth =

Germany missionary (1620–1668)

Heinrich Roth (18 December 1620, Dillingen an der Donau – 20 June 1668, Agra, India), also known as Henricus Rodius or Henrique Roa, was a German missionary and pioneering Sanskrit scholar.

== Life ==
Having been born in Dillingen and raised in Augsburg, where his father Konrad Roth (died 1637) worked as Doctor utriusque iuris for the Prince-Bishopric, from 1635 to 1639 Heinrich Roth studied Rhetoric at the University of Dillingen and Philosophy at the Jesuit college in Innsbruck. In 1639, he became a Jesuit in Landsberg, and from 1641 to 1645 taught at the University of ingolstadt, before returning to Dillingen to start theological studies, which he completed in Ingolstadt in 1649. The same year, he was ordained priest in Eichstätt.

On behalf of Francesco Piccolomini, in 1649 Roth was assigned to the so-called Ethiopian mission to India. Traveling by the land route via Smyrna (1650) and Isfahan, he arrived in Goa by 1652. He worked first on the Island of Salsette off Goa, where from time to time he acted as Portuguese interpreter. He was then sent on an embassy by one of the native princes, and via Uttarakhand finally reached the Mughal Empire and its residence in Agra in 1654. Acting as rector of the Jesuit residence in Agra since 1659, he was involved in the persecution under Shah Jahan and Aurangzeb.

Next to learning the Persian, Kannada and Hindustani languages, Roth at Agra for several years also acquired a knowledge of classical Sanskrit grammar and literature from local pandits. The French explorer and philosopher Francois Bernier, who got acquainted with Roth in these years, got to appreciate him as one versed in expert knowledge of the culture and philosophy of religions in India.

In 1662, joined by fellow Jesuit Johann Grueber, who was on his way back from China, Roth revisited Europe by the land route via Kabul, and arrived in Rome in February 1664. Athanasius Kircher, in his monumental work China illustrata, published their itinerary, Roth's description of the Sanskrit alphabet, and some short excerpts of Roth's other works. Traveling north to Germany, Roth held some public lectures in Neuburg on the history and culture of the Mughal Empire, excerpts of which subsequently appeared in print. In Vienna, Roth succeeded in gaining financial support from emperor Leopold I to have his Sanskrit grammar – the first such work ever compiled by a European, which Roth had completed in Agra by 1660 – appear in print, but the project was stopped by the Jesuit Superior General Giovanni Paolo Oliva.

Ordered by Oliva to set up a Jesuit mission in Nepal, Roth traveled back via Constantinople and Surat, returning to Agra by 1666, where he died in 1668 before he could embark on the Nepalese mission. His gravesite is still visible at the Padri Santos chapel in Lashkarpur, a suburb of Agra.

== Work ==
Heinrich Roth's Sanskrit grammar, that he had completed by 1660 in Latin language under the title Grammatica Linguae Sanscretanae Brachmanum Indiae Orientalis (the manuscript of which is preserved today at the Biblioteca Nazionale Centrale in Rome) and that was augmented by preliminary studies for a complete Sanskrit-Latin dictionary, made him a pioneering scholar in modern Sanskrit studies in Europe. Further works include studies on the Hindustani and Devanagari alphabets, on Vedanta and on Vishnu. Also, a total of 35 letters, written by Roth from India and during his travel back to Europe, survive at the Royal Library of Belgium in Brussels.

== Bibliography ==
=== Editions of Roth’s work ===
- Arnulf Camps/Jean-Claude Muller (Edd.), The Sanskrit grammar and manuscripts of Father Heinrich Roth, S.J. (1620–1668). Facsimile edition of Biblioteca Nazionale, Rome, Mss. Or. 171 and 172, Leiden, 1988. (includes a complete list of Roth's surviving works and references to where parts of them have previously been printed)

=== Studies on Roth ===
- Arnulf Camps, The Sanskrit Grammar and Manuscripts of Father Heinrich Roth S. J. (1620–1668). Introduction. The History of his Sanskrit Manuscripts. In: Arnulf Camps, Studies in Asian mission history 1956-1998, Leiden/Boston/Köln, 2000, pp. 84–104.
- Pierre-Sylvain Filliozat, "L’approche scientifique du sanscrit et de la pensée indienne par Heinrich Roth, S.J. au XVIIe siècle", In: Id. & Jean Leclant eds, L’œuvre scientifique des missionnaires en Asie, Paris : Académie des Inscriptions et Belles-Lettres, 2012, pp. 17–30.
- Veronika Lukas ∙ Julius Oswald SJ ∙ Claudia Wiener (eds), Ein Dillinger in Indien: P. Heinrich Roth SJ (1620-1668), erscheint zugleich als Jahrbuch des Historischen Vereins Dillingen a. d. Donau 121. Jahrgang 2020 (Jesuitica 26), Regensburg : Schnell & Steiner, 2022.
- Claus Vogel, Heinrich Roth, in: Neue Deutsche Biographie 22, 2005, pp. 106 sq. (German) online
- Claus Vogel, The Jesuit missionary Heinrich Roth (1620–1668) and his burial place at Agra. In: Lars Göhler (Ed.): Indische Kultur im Kontext. Rituale, Texte und Ideen aus Indien und der Welt. Festschrift für Klaus Mylius.Wiesbaden, 2005, pp. 407–412.
- Claus Vogel, An old letter from Surat written by German Jesuit Heinrich Roth. In: Annals of the Bhandarkar Oriental Research Institute 58, 1987, pp. 609–619.
- Claus Vogel, Die Vorarbeiten des Jesuitenmissionars Heinrich Roth (1620–1668) zu einem Sanskrit-lateinischen Wörterbuch. In: Helmut Eimer (Ed.): Vicitrakusumañjali. Festschrift für Richard Othon Meisezahl anläßlich seines achtzigsten Geburtstages. Bonn, 1986, pp. 131–146. Shortened English version: Claus Vogel, The preliminary work done by Heinrich Roth (1620–1668) on a Sanskrit-Latin dictionary. In: Aligarh Journal of Oriental Studies 4, No. 1, 1987, pp. 69–74.
- Bruno Zimmel, P. Heinrich Roths SJ Expedition nach Nepal. In: Jahrbuch des Historischen Vereins Dillingen an der Donau 70, 1968, pp. 64-78 (German).
