= Opus 76 =

Opus 76 may refer to:

- Trois grandes études Op.76 of Charles-Valentin Alkan
- 6 Variations in D major, Op.76 by Ludwig van Beethoven
- Eight Piano Pieces (Klavierstücke) Op. 76 of Johannes Brahms
- Six Romances sans paroles, Op.76 by Cécile Chaminade
- Two songs op. 76 by Gabriel Fauré
- The String Quartets, Op. 76 of Joseph Haydn
- 4 Lieder Op. 76 by Felix Mendelssohn
- The Wedding Cake caprice Op. 76 by Camille Saint-Saëns
- Four Marches Op. 76 by Robert Schumann
- 13 pieces for piano Op. 76 by Jean Sibelius
- Die Tageszeiten Op. 76 by Richard Strauss
- The Storm, op. 76 by Peter Ilyich Tchaikovsky
