= Akademisches Gymnasium Innsbruck =

Austrian grammar school

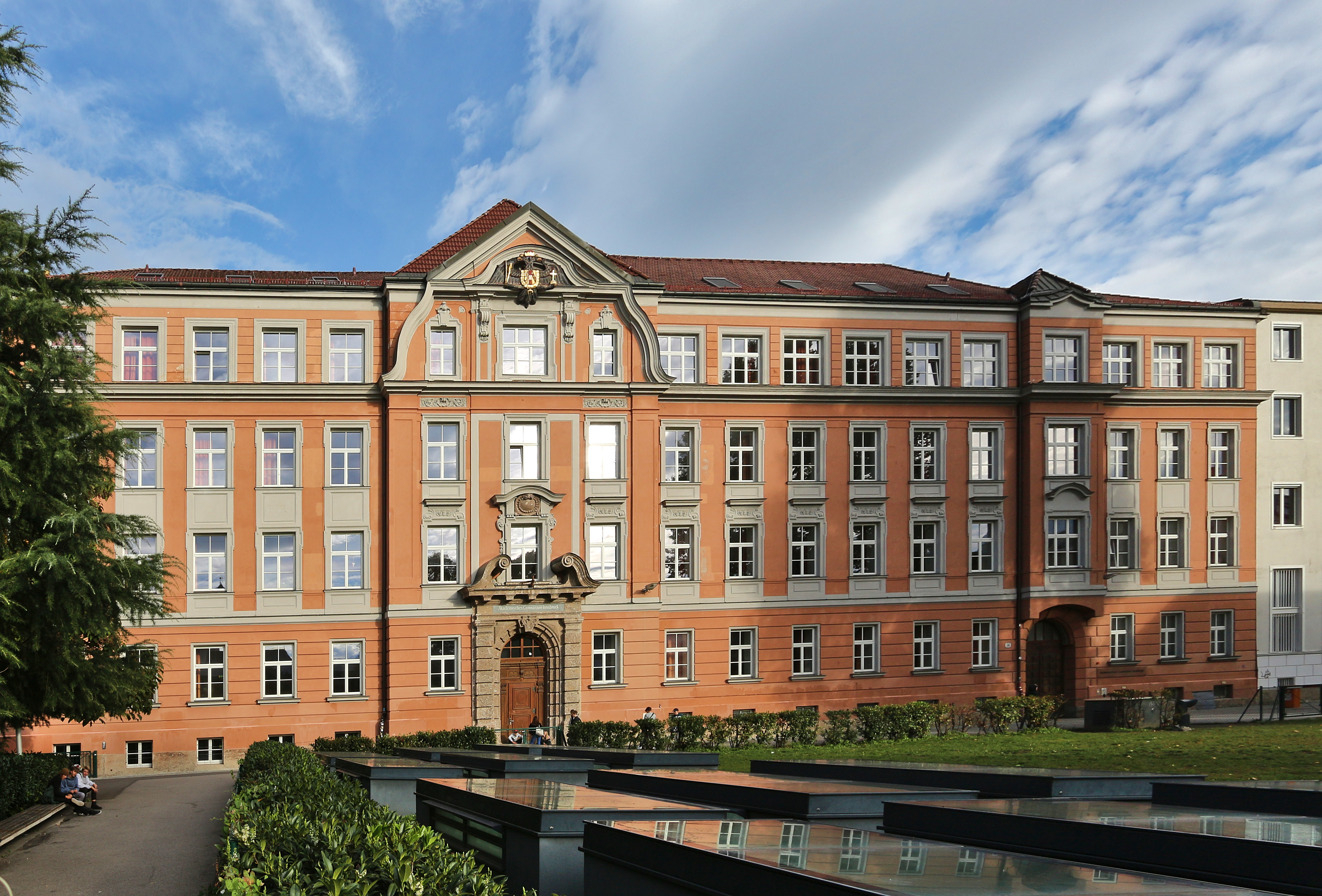

Location
- Innsbruck, Tyrol; Austria
- 47°16′04″N 11°23′51″E

Information
- Other name: AGI
- Type: Public gymnasium grammar school
- Established: 12 May 1562; 464 years ago
- Superintendent: Mag. Rosmarie Knoflach (2021)
- Faculty: 96 (2007)
- Website: www.agi.tsn.at

The Akademisches Gymnasium Innsbruck is a public gymnasium grammar school in Innsbruck, Tyrol, Austria. Founded in 1562 by the Jesuits in the course of the Counter-Reformation, it is the oldest school in Western Austria and one of the oldest schools in the German-speaking world.

== History ==
=== 16th – 17th century ===
At the beginning of the 16th century, Emperor Maximilian I intended to establish a latin school in Innsbruck, which would grant access to education for everyone. However, it took almost fifty years until his successor Emperor Ferdinand I. entrusted the Jesuits under Petrus Canisius with the creation of a church, college and latin school in 1562. It finally opened on 25 June of the same year with 71 pupils (including aristocrats and former pupils of the city's parish school), making it the second oldest Jesuit school in Austria.

Until 1575, classes took place in the "Neues Stift" (New Monastery) and afterwards in the building of the Jesuit College. Today, the former hosts the folk art museum (Volkskunstmuseum). In 1606, a new school building was erected that facilitated adequate rooms for the rising number of students. It was, however, only in 1660 that the school and the Jesuit convent were completed and the Jesuit Church was finally dedicated. Today, this set of buildings, planned by Georg Anton Gumpp, and expanded subsequently, hosts the theological faculty of the University of Innsbruck.

During the pest years of 1611 and 1634, the school had to be closed for several months. However, on orders of the Archduke it was not transformed into a hospital and could resume its work shortly after. In the year of its 100th birthday, already 604 pupils frequented the school, including 17 squires as well as 38 counts and barons.

On 15 October 1669, the University of Innsbruck was founded with four faculties, financed via the salt-mine in nearby Hall in Tirol. The latin school's pupils could thus attend the local university after having graduated from the preparatory philosophical classes.

=== 18th – 19th century ===
Due to damages caused by earthquakes, the main building had to be completely rebuilt and was inaugurated in 1724. The new building accommodated not only classrooms, but also a theatre hall, a hall for big school reunions and a chapel. The school would remain in this building until 1868.

During the early 18th century, the curriculum at public schools in the Habsburg empire was unified and the state's influence on education increased, at the church's expense. The first list of books for grammar schools, for instance, was published in 1770.

When the Jesuit order was suspended by Emperor Joseph II. in 1773, only 300 pupils attended the grammar school. Since replacing the Jesuit teachers was not easy, it took several years until the last former Jesuit teachers had left the school. They were primarily replaced by members of the Servite Order.

At the beginning of the 19th century, the Austrian defeat in the Napoleonic Wars brought the Tyrol under Bavarian reign. It was therefore in 1806, that the Bavarian curriculum was introduced, only to be replaced again by the Austrian programme of study in 1814. The Austrian grade scale of 1 – 5, for example, was replaced by a scale of 1 – 6 (both systems still being used in the respective countries today). Subsequently, the new Austrian curriculum, enacted in 1805, could only be implemented in 1814. And even though the AGI had used subject teachers for more than ten years (due to the Bavarian and later the new Austrian curricula), this systems was again abandoned in 1818.

After the reinstitution of the Jesuit order by Pope Pius VII in 1814, the Jesuits directed the school from 1839 until 1848, when the regional seat was ultimately abandoned.

The "Gymnasialreform of 1849" created the first Ministry of education in the Habsburg Empire ("Ministerium für Cultus und Unterricht") and reorganised primary and secondary education in the empire, giving the state final control over education at the expense of religious institutions that had executed these duties for centuries:

After four years of primary school (Volksschule), pupils attending a "Gymnasium" would first attend middle school ("Unterstufe") for four years, followed by another four years of high school ("Oberstufe"). The curriculum aimed at a general education in languages, history, mathematics, natural sciences and philosophy, including Latin and ancient Greek.

After these eight years, usually at the age of 18, the final examination passed ("Matura/Reifeprüfung") was a unified prerequisite to attend university.

At that time, mandatory subjects taught included: Religion, Latin, Greek, mother tongue, Geography, History, Mathematics, Natural History, Physics and Philosophy. Pupils could also choose electives: other languages of the empire, foreign languages, calligraphy, stenography, arts, music and gymnastics.

This organisational structure is, with certain adjustments, still valid today.

=== 20th – 21st century ===
The current school building was erected in 1909–1910, in close proximity to the Jesuit Church, regional museum (Landesmuseum Ferdinandeum) and the historic building, which now hosts the Theological faculty of the university.

After the Anschluss 1938, the German curriculum was introduced for 5th through 10th grade, whilst the Austrian was maintained for pupils in 11th and 12th grade. Due to the Nazis' policy, several teachers had to leave the school either for political or racist reasons and the director, Manfred Mumelter, was deported to KZ Dachau.

In the last war years, the school was relocated to Steinach am Brenner and later to Zürs am Arlberg. It was only in October 1945, i.e. five months after the end of the Second World War, that teaching could be resumed in Innsbruck.

It was after the war that, due to the important increase in the number of pupils and the inherent lack of space, plans for expanding the school were established once again. From 1957 on, it was de facto two schools that were occupying the same building, one in the morning and the other in the afternoon. Finally, a new school was built in 1965 and the corps of pupils and teachers split between those remaining at the "old" AGI and the "new" Gymnasium Reithmannstraße.

With the introduction of coeducation in public schools in Austria in 1975, the first girls could attend the school.

In 1980, the small alley leading to the school was renamed after Prof. Franz Mair, former student and teacher at the AGI, as well as member of the resistance during the Third Reich. He was killed on 3 May 1945, i.e. five days before the unconditional surrender of Nazi Germany, in front of the Landhaus in Innsbruck.

After two years of renovation and temporary relocation near the airport, the school returned to its historic building in the autumnal semester 2007.

== Bilingual education ==
Since 1996, the school has been teaching students bilingually, and in particular in the subject areas of Geography and Economics, and in Biology and Environmental Science. The use of English as an instructional language has expanded gradually; now known as Bilingual Class for Economics, Personal Skills and Subject-specific Language (BICEPS), this concept has received a high level of acceptance by parents and students alike, and was further supported by two scientific evaluations (Hirner 2000, Strasser 2010, University of Innsbruck).

=== International School Innsbruck ===
In 2012/13 the bilingual stream was further developed into what is now known as an International Class. The intention is to offer a highly academic programme with supporting co-curricular areas. As of 2015 the International School Innsbruck (ISI) at Akademisches Gymnasium Innsbruck has been granted the status of a International Baccalaureate World School candidate.

Alongside the acquisition of a high level English competency, the class is educated using subject-specific English in the learning areas of Geography and Economics as well as Biology and Environmental Studies. Further selected subjects are also taught in English and supported by English-speaking staff.

The international class is open to all primary school graduates with talented language skills. International students arriving in Innsbruck are also provided with an attractive learning programme in which to continue their education.

The final two years of upper secondary schooling (Year Level 7 & 8) include the teaching of parallel curricula – the Austrian National Curriculum and that of the International Baccalaureate Diploma Programme. Alongside the compulsory Austrian School Leaving Examination (Österreichische Matura) students have the opportunity, in their final year, to participate in and graduate from the International Baccalaureate Diploma Programme.

== Activities ==
=== Model European Parliament ===
The MEP is a simulation of the European Parliament, aiming to teach students the way political decisions are made and to raise awareness of the European Union and its institutions. There are national sessions held every year to select the participants representing the respective country at the international sessions.

=== Pupils' Parliament (Schülerinnen Parlament) ===
The Pupils' Parliament is the assembly of all students of the last 4 years (Oberstufe) and makes decisions, prepared by committees, which are forwarded to the "Schulgemeinschaftsausschuss" (body of representatives of teachers, parents and pupils, making decisions in areas in which the school has an autonomous decision). The intention is to promote democracy and integrate the pupils in the decision-making process.

=== Youth Parliament of the Alpine Convention ===
Together with the Permanent Secretariat of the Alpine Convention, the first youth parliament took place in Innsbruck in 2006 and is to continue on an annual basis. Questions of special interest for the inhabitants of the Alpine region are discussed by youngsters from the Alpine Convention's Member states in this forum. The results are forwarded to the Permanent Secretariat and presented to Alpine Conference and the Permanent Committee.

=== Platform for Political Education (Platform für Politische Bildung) ===
This pupils' initiative aims at raising awareness for politics and discussions amongst teenagers. The group organises discussions with politicians and scholars, particularly in the light of the new Austrian legislation that set the voting age at 16.

=== Social Initiative "Zeit schenken" ===
In this voluntary project, pupils visit and work in social institutions like homes for elderly people, children with migration background or handicapped people.

=== Sports ===
The Volleyball-teams of the AGI in particular are successful at regional and national level.

=== "Sparkling Science" ===
Together with the University of Innsbruck, pupils have the possibility to participate in actual research projects conducted at university level. E.g. "Computer Simulations and Simulation Experiments – Essentials, Solutions and the Origin of Life"

=== Trips ===
Students of AGI are taken on learning excursions, both domestically and internationally, during their studies. The different grades take the following trips:

- 2. Klasse (6th Grade): Ski Week in Pitztal
- 3. Klasse (7th Grade): Language Week in Eastbourne
- 5. Klasse (9th Grade): Summer Sports Week at Pillersee
- 6. Klasse (10th Grade): Language Week in Southeastern Michigan and Chicago
- 7. Klasse (11th Grade): Language Weeks in Cannes, Dijon or Toulouse (French group) and Orvieto (Italian group); Humanities trip to Auschwitz and Mauthausen

== Notable alumni ==
The following alumni attended the school and, where indicated, matriculated in a given year:

- Jürgen Bodenseer (1965), president of the Tyrolean Economic Chamber
- Bruno Buchberger (1960), mathematician
- Anna Gamper (1993), first female professor of law at the University of Innsbruck
- Alphons Huber (1852), historian
- Eusebio Kino (1664), missionary and explorer of Mexico & USA
- Andreas Khol (1959), former head of the Austrian national council (Nationalratspräsident)
- Herbert Lochs (1964), president of the Medical University Innsbruck
- Franz Mair (1930), teacher and member of the resistance
- Adolf Pichler (1837), writer, natural scientist
- Franz Senn (1849), founder of the German Alpine Club (Deutscher Alpenverein)
- Josef Rampold (1943), former editor in chief of the South-Tyrolean newspaper Dolomiten
- Reinhold Stecher (1939), former bishop of Innsbruck
- Alexander Van der Bellen (1962), 9th President of Austria
- Mirjam Weichselbraun

== See also ==
- List of Jesuit educational institutions
