= Der Abendhimmel, WAB 55 =

1862 song composed by Anton Bruckner

Der Abendhimmel
- Secular choral work by Anton Bruckner
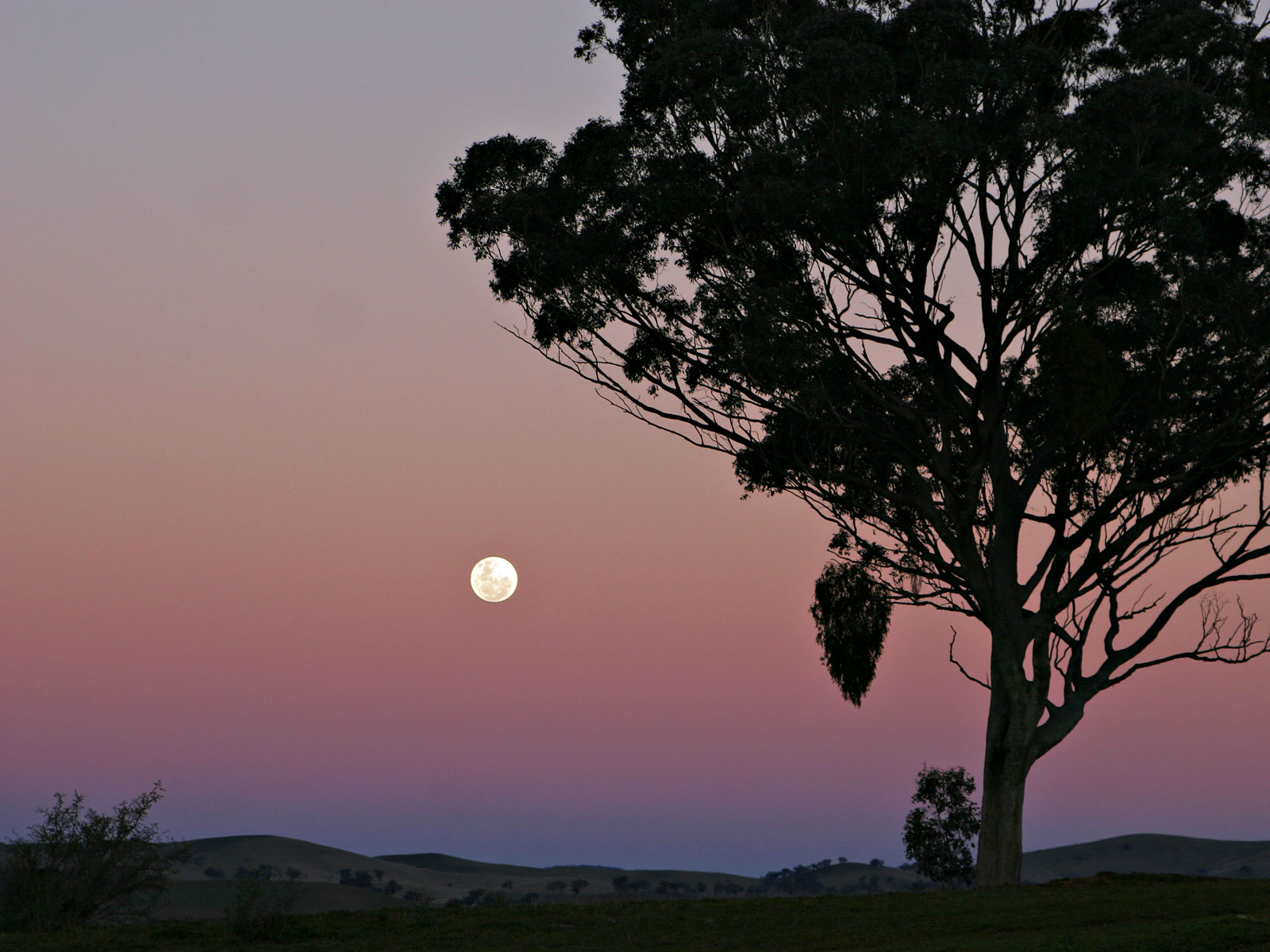
- Key: A♭ major
- Catalogue: WAB 55
- Text: Joseph Christian von Zedlitz
- Language: German
- Composed: January 1862: Linz
- Published: 1932: Regensburg
- Vocal: TTBB quartet

Der Abendhimmel ("The evening sky"), WAB 55, is a song composed by Anton Bruckner in 1862.

== History ==
Bruckner composed this first setting of "evening song" Der Abendhimmel in January 1862. He used for the composition a text of Joseph Christian von Zedlitz, which he would also use for a second setting of the song in 1866. Bruckner dedicated the song to the men's quartet Anton Munsch [Anton Munsch (1st tenor), Anton Stiefler (2nd tenor), Eduard Benoni (1st bass) and Mathias Weissmann (2nd bass)].

The piece was performed first in a transcription for men's choir by the Liedertafel Frohsinn on 4 July 1900. The commentator of the Linzer Zeitung (7 July 1900) wrote over a eine herrliche Schöpfung unseres heimischen Meisters Dr. Anton Bruckner (a wonderful composition of our national master Dr. Anton Bruckner).

The original manuscript is stored in the archive of Österreichische Nationalbibliothek. It was first issued in Band III/2, pp. 18–20 of the Göllerich/Auer biography. It is issued in Band XXIII/2, No. 15 of the Gesamtausgabe.

== Text ==
Der Abendhimmel is using a text of Joseph Christian von Zedlitz.

Wenn ich an deiner Seite
Im Abenddunkel geh’,
Den Mond und sein Geleite,
Die tausend Sterne seh’,

Dann möchte ich den Mond umfangen
Und drücken an meine Brust,
Die Sterne herunterlangen
In voller, seliger Lust,

Mit ihnen die Locken dir schmücken
Und schmücken die schöne Brust,
Ich möcht’ dich schmücken und drücken
Und sterben von Wonn’ und Lust.

When I walk at your side
In the evening darkness,
And see the moon and its escort
Of thousand stars,

Then I want to embrace the moon
And hug her at my breast,
Sprawl the stars down
In full blissful lust,

Decorate your locks with them
And adorn your beautiful bosom,
I could to decorate and hug you
And die of delight and lust.

== Music ==
The 38-bar long work in 6/8 is in A♭ major. It is scored for TTBB quartet a cappella.

== Discography ==
There are two recordings of Der Abendhimmel, WAB 55:

- Guido Mancusi, Chorus Viennensis, Musik, du himmlisches Gebilde! – CD: ORF CD 73, 1995
- Thomas Kerbl, Quartet of the Männerchorvereinigung Bruckner 08, Anton Bruckner – Männerchöre – CD: LIVA 027, 2008

== Sources ==
- August Göllerich, Anton Bruckner. Ein Lebens- und Schaffens-Bild, c. 1922 – posthumous edited by Max Auer by G. Bosse, Regensburg, 1932
- Anton Bruckner – Sämtliche Werke, Band XXIII/2: Weltliche Chorwerke (1843–1893), Musikwissenschaftlicher Verlag der Internationalen Bruckner-Gesellschaft, Angela Pachovsky and Anton Reinthaler (Editor), Vienna, 1989
- Uwe Harten, Anton Bruckner. Ein Handbuch. Residenz Verlag, Salzburg, 1996. ISBN 3-7017-1030-9.
- Cornelis van Zwol, Anton Bruckner 1824–1896 – Leven en werken, uitg. Thoth, Bussum, Netherlands, 2012. ISBN 978-90-6868-590-9
- Crawford Howie, Anton Bruckner - A documentary biography, online revised edition
