= Der Abendhimmel, WAB 56 =

1866 song composed by Anton Bruckner

Der Abendhimmel
- Secular choral work by Anton Bruckner
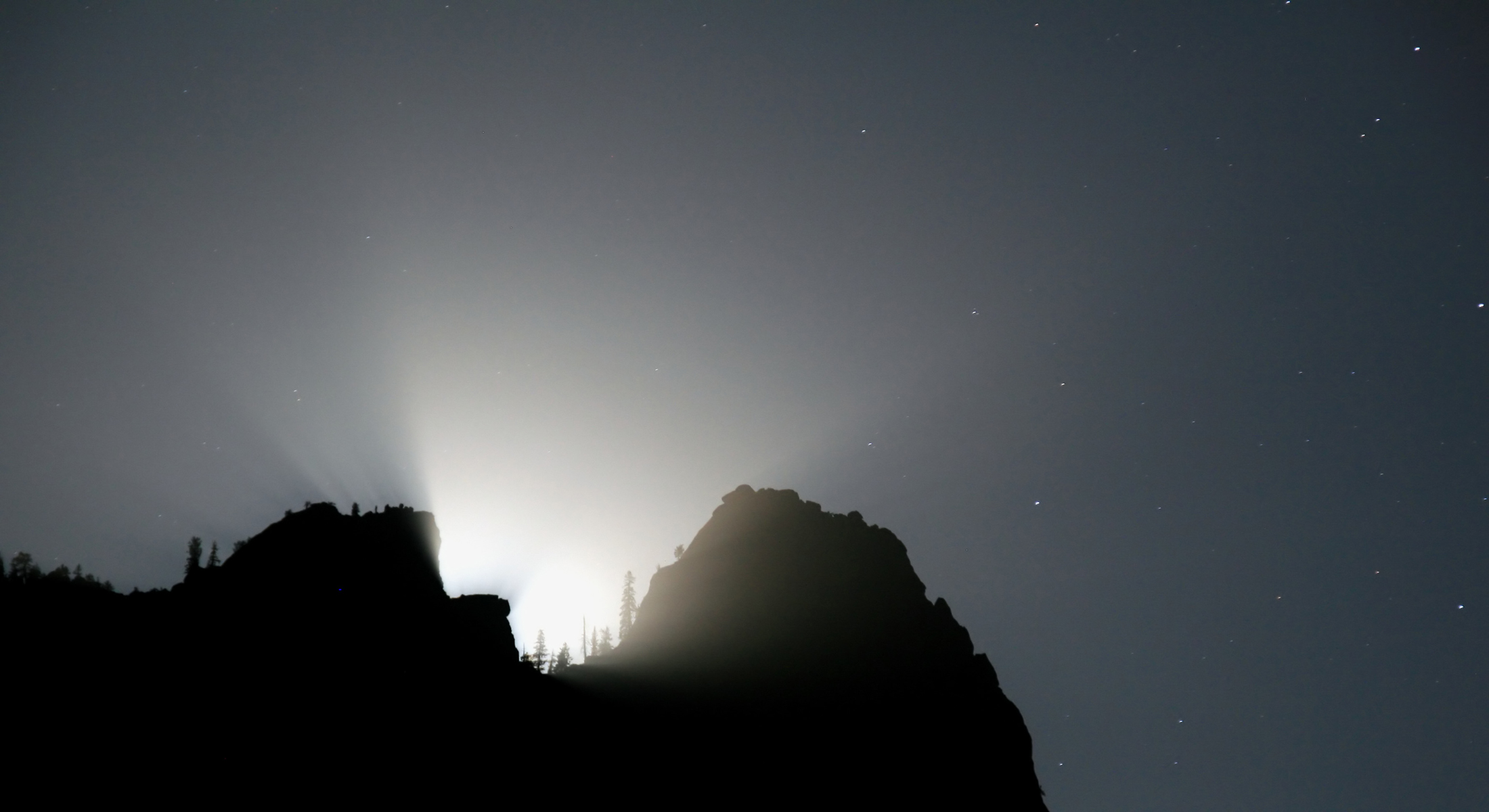
- Lunar crepuscular rays
- Key: F major
- Catalogue: WAB 56
- Text: Joseph Christian von Zedlitz
- Language: German
- Composed: 6 December 1866: Linz
- Dedication: Niederösterreichischer Sängerbund
- Published: 1902: Vienna
- Vocal: TTBB choir

Der Abendhimmel ("The evening sky"), WAB 56, is a song composed by Anton Bruckner in 1866. It is the second setting of the work. In 1862, Bruckner had already composed a first setting of the song for men's voice quartet.

== History ==
Bruckner composed this second setting "evening song" Der Abendhimmel on 6 December 1866. He used again the text of Joseph Christian von Zedlitz, which he had already used for the first setting in 1862. Bruckner dedicated the song to Niederösterreichischer Sängerbund (singers association of Lower Austria). The piece was performed first by the Wiener Männergesang-Verein (men's singer society of Vienna) on 17 December 1898.

The original manuscript is stored in the archive of Österreichische Nationalbibliothek. It was first issued as Zwei Männerchöre by Doblinger, Vienna in 1902 together with the Vaterlandslied, WAB 92 "O könnt' ich dich beglücken". The work is issued in Band XXIII/2, No. 19 of the Gesamtausgabe.

== Music ==
The 38-bar long work in F major is scored for TTBB choir a cappella. This second setting of Der Abendhimmel exhibits several modulations and rests, which are characteristic of Bruckner's later melodies.

== Discography ==
A selection among the few recordings of Der Abendhimmel, WAB 56:

- Guido Mancusi, Chorus Viennensis, Musik, du himmlisches Gebilde! – CD: ORF CD 73, 1995
- Thomas Kerbl, Quartet of the Männerchorvereinigung Bruckner 08, Anton Bruckner – Männerchöre – CD: LIVA 027, 2008
- Jan Schumacher, Camerata Musica Limburg, Serenade. Songs of night and love – CD: Genuin GEN 12224, 2011

== Sources ==
- Anton Bruckner – Sämtliche Werke, Band XXIII/2: Weltliche Chorwerke (1843–1893), Musikwissenschaftlicher Verlag der Internationalen Bruckner-Gesellschaft, Angela Pachovsky and Anton Reinthaler (editor), Vienna, 1989
- Uwe Harten, Anton Bruckner. Ein Handbuch. Residenz Verlag, Salzburg, 1996. ISBN 3-7017-1030-9.
- Cornelis van Zwol, Anton Bruckner 1824–1896 – Leven en werken, uitg. Thoth, Bussum, Netherlands, 2012. ISBN 978-90-6868-590-9
- Crawford Howie, Anton Bruckner - A documentary biography, online revised edition
