= Wiener Schubertbund =

Men's choir in Vienna, Austria

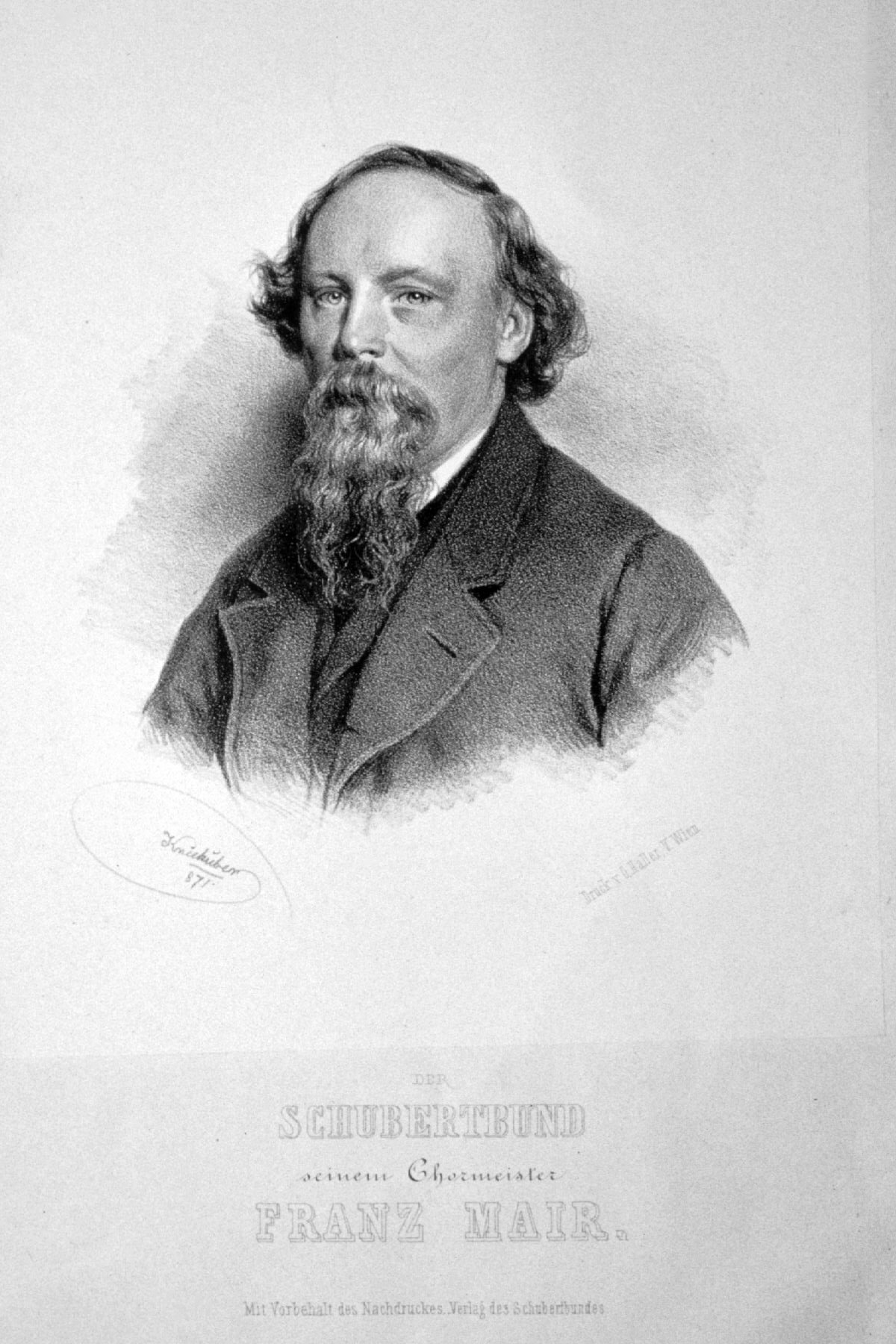
Franz Mair, founder of the choir

The Wiener Schubertbund ("Vienna Schubert Society") is a men's choir in Vienna, Austria, founded in 1863.

== History ==
The choir's founder in 1863, and its first musical director, was Franz Mair. It was originally affiliated to a teachers' association, and known as the Lehrersängerchor Schubertbund. The reference to Franz Schubert was significant in that Schubert was from a family of teachers, himself having been at one time a teacher. In 1870 the choir left the teachers' association, and was renamed Schubertbund. Since 1918 the choir has been based in the Vienna Concert Hall, and it has had the name Wiener Schubertbund since 1922.

132 singers were present at the first rehearsal in 1863; at the thousandth concert in 1924 there were about 400 singers. At the first rehearsal in 1946 after the Second World War there were 80 singers. In 2005 there were about 50 active members. The choir has given concerts outside Austria: in recent years it has visited the USA, China, Syria and Brazil.

From its founding, the choir has paid particular attention to the works of Franz Schubert; at its first concert in 1864, Schubert's Deutsche Messe, D 872, was performed. It performs works by important composers of all musical periods. Works have been dedicated to the choir by composers including Richard Strauss (Die Tageszeiten), Wilhelm Kienzl and Franz Lehár.

== Musical directors ==
Past musical directors include Adolf Kirchl, Ferdinand Rebay, Hermann von Schmeidel, Anton Webern, Viktor Keldorfer, Reinhold Schmid, Hans Gillesberger, Leo Lehner and Heinrich Gattermeyer. The present musical director (in 2019) is Fritz Brucker.
