= Die Tageszeiten =

- Choral composition by Richard Strauss
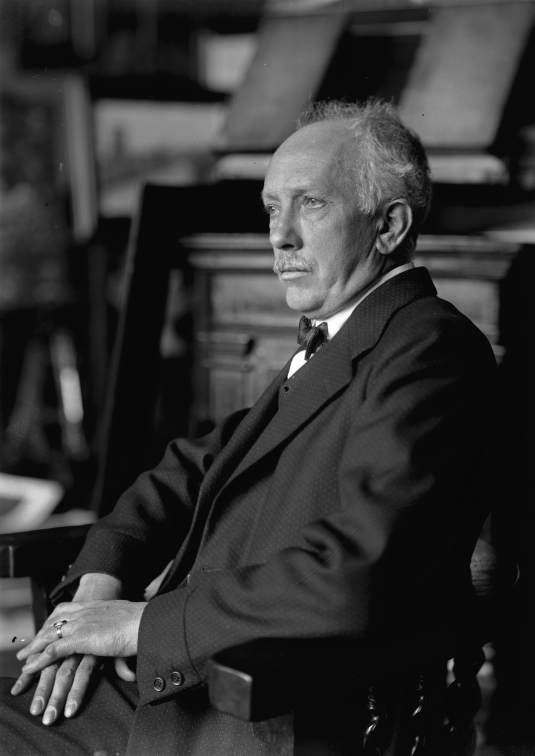
- Strauss, photo by Schmutzer 1922
- English: Times of the Day
- Catalogue: TrV 256
- Opus: 76
- Text: Poems by Joseph Eichendorff
- Language: German
- Composed: 19 December 1927, Vienna.
- Dedication: To The Wiener Schubertbund and their conductor Viktor Keldorfer
- Scoring: Male voice choir and orchestra.

Die Tageszeiten (Times of the Day) is a choral composition written for male voice choir and orchestra by Richard Strauss (1864–1949), TrV 256, Op. 76 (published 1928). It consists of four movements: "The Morning", "Afternoon Peace", "The Evening" and "The Night". The lyrics are based on four poems of the same names by Joseph Eichendorff (1788–1857) from his collection Wanderlieder (Wanderers' songs). The work was premiered on 21 July 1928 with the Wiener Schubertbund (Vienna Schubert Society) and the Vienna Philharmonic as part of the Schubert centenary.

== Composition history ==
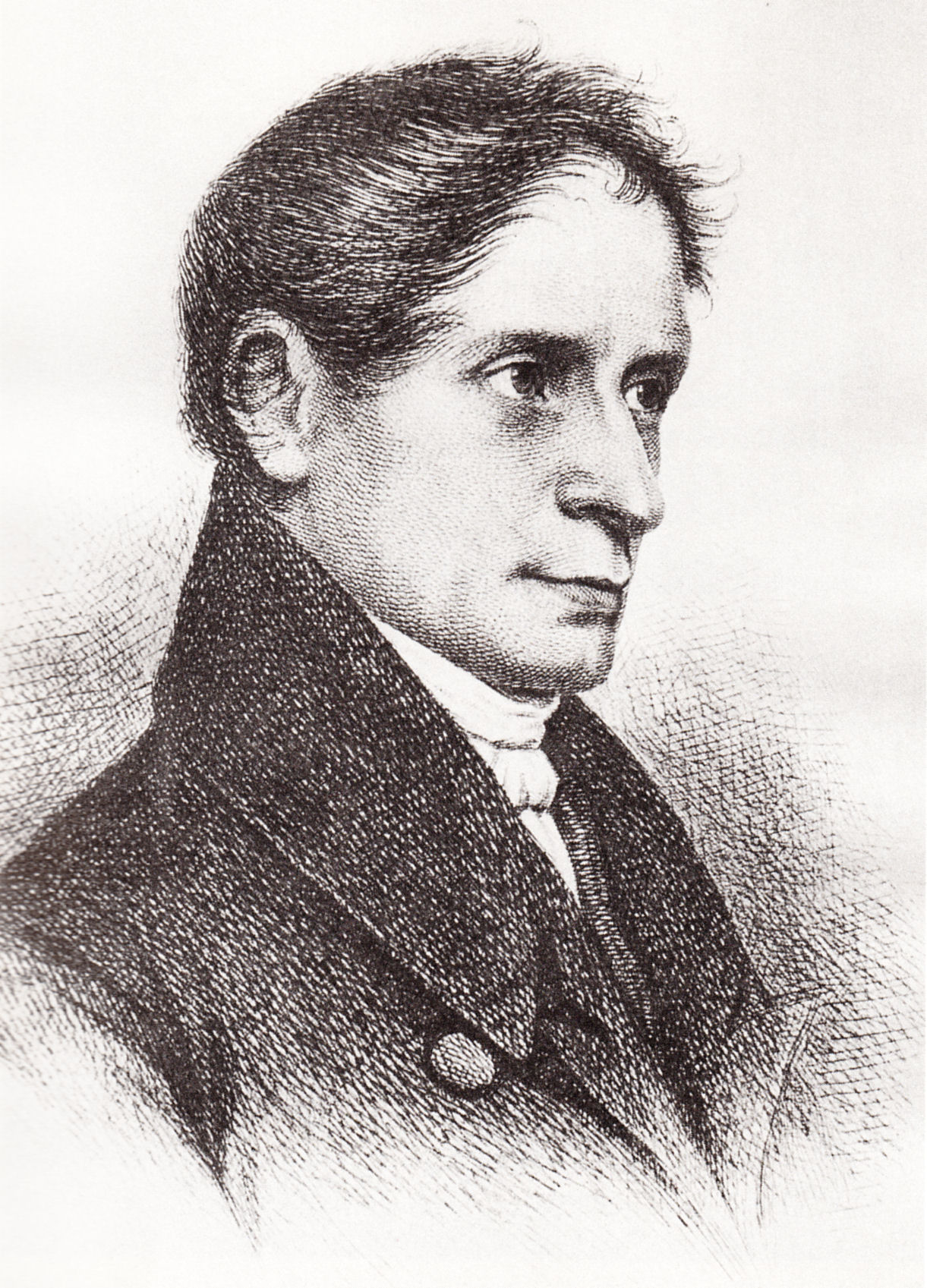
Joseph Freiherr von Eichendorff, the author of the lyrics

On 1 May 1924, the male voice choir of the Wiener Schubertbund (Vienna Schubert Society) serenaded Strauss in honor of his sixtieth birthday outside his house on Mozart-Platz. The choirmaster, Viktor Keldorfer, took the opportunity to ask if Strauss might write a piece for the choir and suggested the poetry of Joseph Freiherr von Eichendorff as a possible text. Eichendorff was a very popular Romantic poet whose songs had been set many times by composers, such as Hugo Wolf. Indeed, Strauss had used Eichendorff in earlier choral works and was to turn to Eichendorff twenty years later for one of his Four Last Songs, Im Abendrot, also about a time of the day. His response to Keldorfer's suggestion was to comment about the poet: "Good! Very good! He is a full blooded romanticist who is close to me".

The idea developed slowly in Strauss' mind, and Keldorfer heard nothing until in 1927 he received an invitation to visit Strauss at his home in Garmisch where Strauss showed him three of a four movement song cycle based on poems from Eichendorff's Wanderlieder ("Der Abend" was completed later that year). In this initial version, Strauss had composed an orchestral opening, a depiction of dawn leading to the first line of the poem "Fliegt der erste Morgenstrahl". Keldorfer suggested an alternative opening in which the choir sang a cappella using a verse from Eichendorf's poetic novella Die Glücksritter (The Fortune Seekers). Del Mar comments that the verse had been used previously by Hans Pfitzner, which might have put Strauss off. However, he duly obliged Keldorfer and replaced the orchestral introduction with the a cappella opening. Del Mar writes about Die Tageszeiten:

Although the shape of the pieces arise from the form of the Eichendorff poems, the style of the music depends on the instrumental textures ... whilst the vocal lines adopt a relatively subordinate role. The peaceful second movement has its roots firmly planted in German folk-song, though its conventionality is qualified by Strauss' calculated indifference to the rules of strict part writing. the movement conjures up both the sultry heat and provides an attractive contrast to the more vivacious movements which flank it ... The last two songs run continuously, Evening merging appropriately into Night with haunting suggestions of distant storms. The final song is a peaceful and attractive Nocturne which opens with a horn solo and has a middle section filled with birdsong and atmospheric orchestration. The work ends with a hymn like repetition of the final verse.

Strauss did not conduct the premiere in Vienna on 21 July 1928. He did conduct the piece with the Wiener Schubertbund the next year, on 23 January 1929.

== Lyrics ==
Richard Strauss based the lyrics for Die Tageszeiten on the following poems by Joseph Eichendorff (1788–1857):

=== Introduction (a cappella) ===
Wann der Hahn kräht auf dem Dache,
Putzt der Mond die Lampe aus
Und die Stern ziehn von der Wache
Gott, Gott behüte Land und Haus.

=== Morning ===
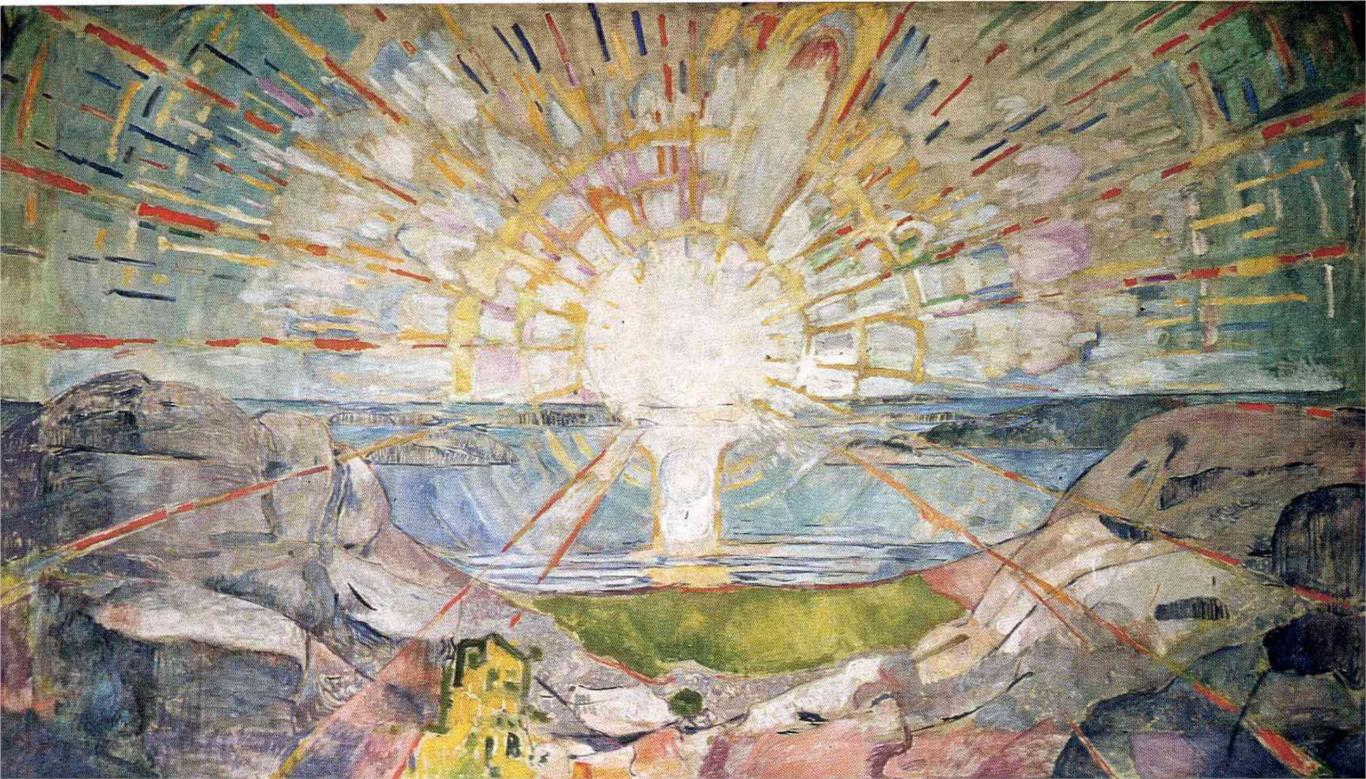
The Sun by Edvard Munch (1911)

Der Morgen

Fliegt der erste Morgenstrahl
Durch das stille Nebeltal,
Rauscht erwachend Wald und Hügel:
Wer da fliegen kann, nimmt Flügel!

Und sein Hütlein in die Luft
Wirft der Mensch vor Lust und ruft:
Hat Gesang doch auch noch Schwingen,
Nun, so will ich fröhlich singen!

Hinaus, o Mensch, weit in die Welt,
Bangt dir das Herz in krankem Mut;
Nichts ist so trüb in Nacht gestellt,
Der Morgen leicht macht's wieder gut.

=== Afternoon Rest ===
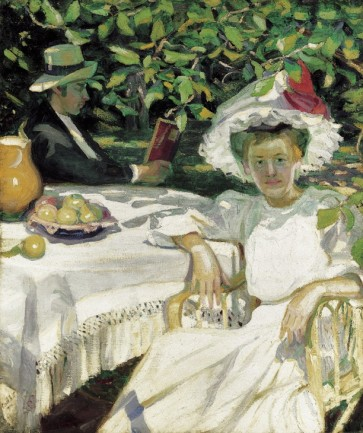
Afternoon Rest by Jeno Csuk (1910)

Mittagsruh

Über Bergen, Fluß und Talen,
Stiller Lust und tiefen Qualen
Webet heimlich, schillert, Strahlen!
Sinnend ruht des Tags Gewühle
In der dunkelblauen Schwüle,
Und die ewigen Gefühle,
Was dir selber unbewußt,
Treten heimlich, groß und leise
Aus der Wirrung fester Gleise,
Aus der unbewachten Brust,
In die stillen, weiten Kreise.

=== Evening ===
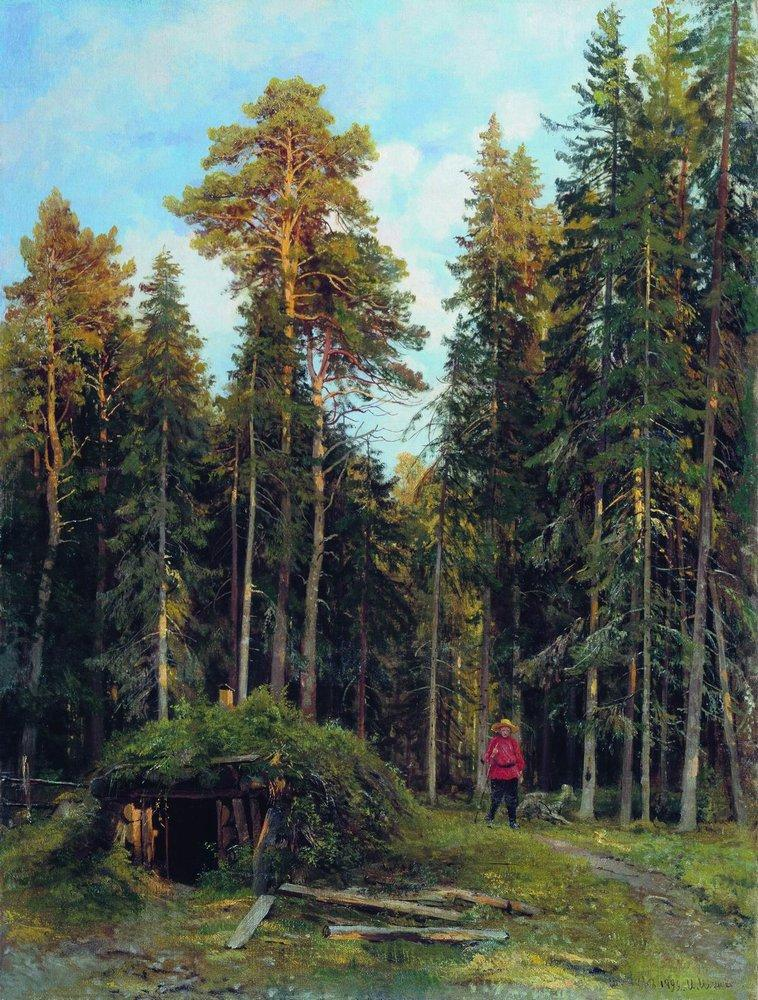
The Evening Forest by Ivan Shishkin (1892)

Der Abend

Schweigt der Menschen laute Lust:
Rauscht die Erde wie in Träumen
Wunderbar mit allen Bäumen,
Was dem Herzen kaum bewußt,
Alte Zeiten, linde Trauer,
Und es schweifen leise Schauer
Wetterleuchtend durch die Brust.

=== Night ===
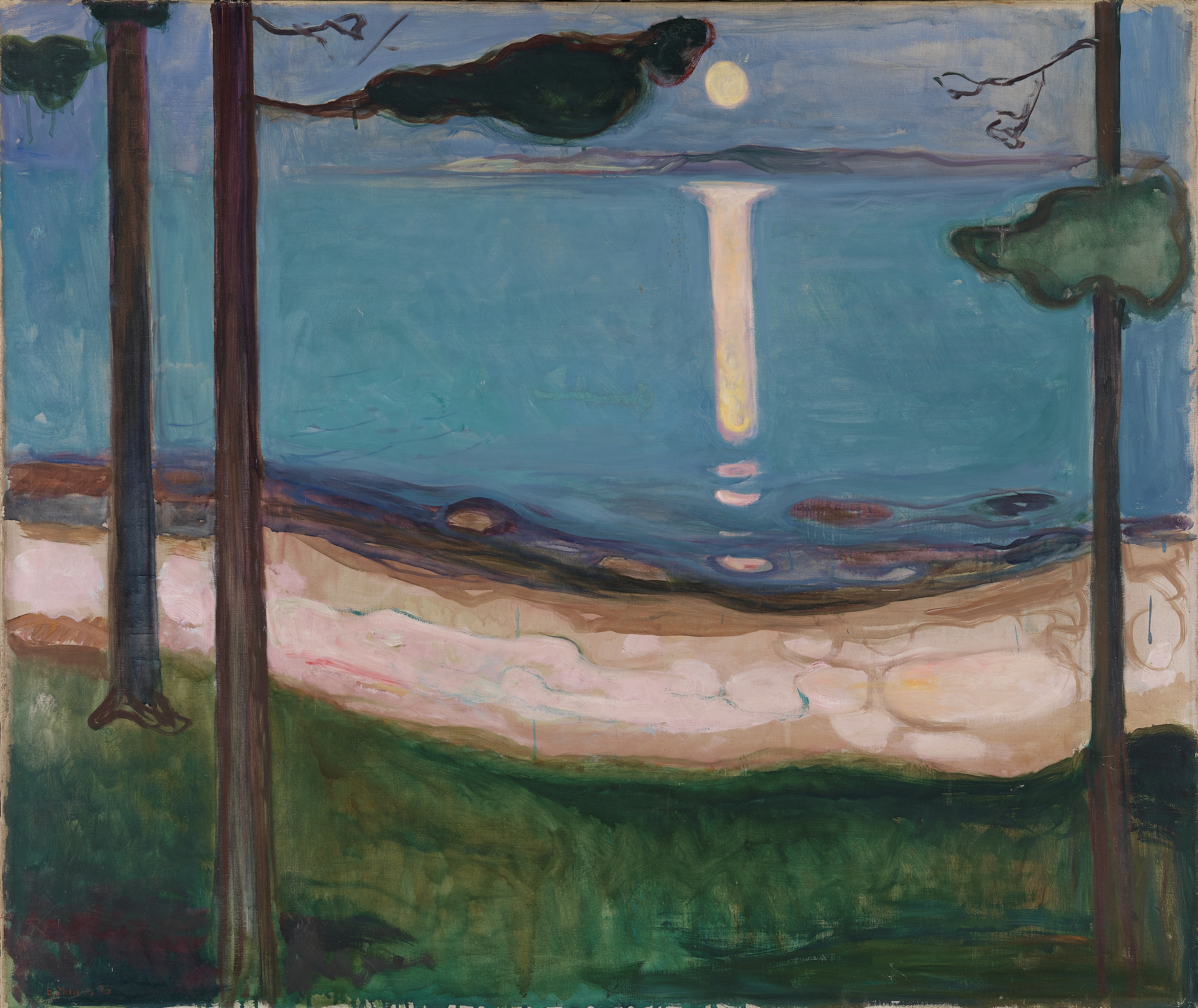
Moonlight by Edvard Munch (1895)

Die Nacht

Wie schön, hier zu verträumen
Die Nacht im stillen Wald,
Wenn in den dunklen Bäumen
Das alte Märchen hallt.

Die Berg im Mondesschimmer
Wie in Gedanken stehn,
Und durch verworrne Trümmer
Die Quellen klagend gehn.

Denn müd ging auf den Matten
Die Schönheit nun zur Ruh,
Es deckt mit kühlen Schatten
Die Nacht das Liebchen zu.

Das ist das irre Klagen
In stiller Waldespracht,
Die Nachtigallen schlagen
Von ihr die ganze Nacht.

Die Stern gehn auf und nieder –
Wann kommst du, Morgenwind,
Und hebst die Schatten wieder
Von dem verträumten Kind?

Schon rührt sichs in den Bäumen,
Die Lerche weckt sie bald –
So will ich treu verträumen
Die Nacht im stillen Wald.

== Choir and orchestra ==
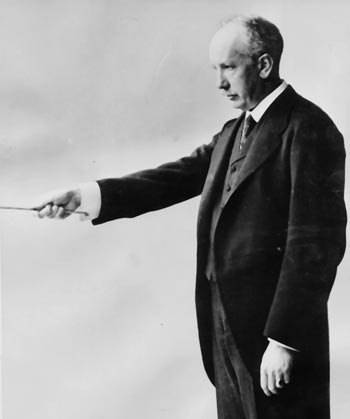
Strauss the conductor, around 1924

The male voice choir is scored for two tenor parts and two bass parts. The orchestra consists of:

- Two flutes, two oboes, two clarinets, bass clarinet, two bassoons, double bassoon.
- Four french horns, two trumpets, three trombones, tuba
- Timpani
- Harp
- Organ (Night)
- Strings

Clemens Krauss made an arrangement for mixed choir (SATB) after the composer's death, which was premiered with the Vienna Philharmonic on 2 March 1952.

== Sources ==
- Richard Strauss Edition: Volume 30 Works for Choir and Orchestra, Peters Edition, Richard Strauss Verlag, Vienna (2004), ISMN 9790014106997.
- Del Mar, Norman, Richard Strauss. A Critical Commentary on his Life and Works, Volume 2, London: Faber and Faber (2009)[1969] (second edition), ISBN 978-0-571-25097-4.
- Lodata, Suzanne, The Challenge of the Choral Works, chapter 11 in Mark-Daniel Schmid, Richard Strauss Companion, Praeger Publishers, Westfield CT, (2003), ISBN 0-313-27901-2.
- Trenner, Franz (2003) Richard Strauss Chronik, Verlag Dr Richard Strauss Gmbh, Wien, ISBN 3-901974-01-6.
