= Herbert Lochs =

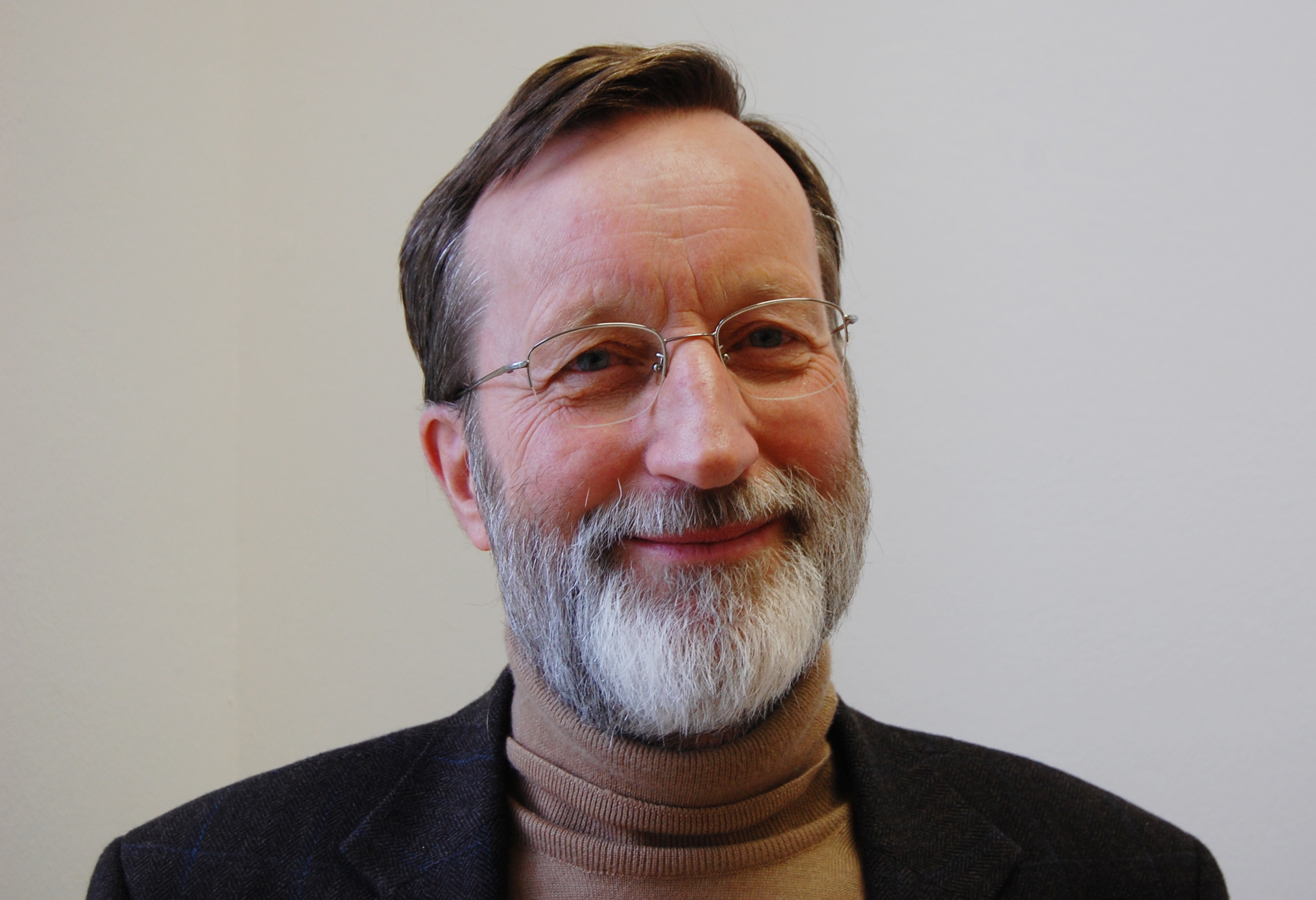
Herbert Lochs

Prof. Herbert Lochs, MD (20 October 1946 – 10 February 2015) was a prominent German and Austrian medical doctor and scientist.

After graduating from the University of Innsbruck Medical School, Austria he completed his residency at the Institute of Pharmacology at the University of Innsbruck. Then he moved to Vienna for the internship in internal medicine and became Assistant professor for internal medicine and gastroenterology at the Medical Faculty of the University of Vienna in 1973. He received Board Accreditation for Internal Medicine by the Austrian Medical Association.

Lochs went for a sabbatical to the University of Pittsburgh Medical School, which was focused on Clinical Nutrition and Metabolism. After returning to the University of Vienna Medical School he became Associate Professor at the Department of Gastroenterology.

In 1994, Lochs became chairman of the Department of Gastroenterology, Hepatology, Endocrinology and Metabolism at the Charité Medical Faculty, Berlin. . The main interests of his work were inflammatory bowel disease, nutrition, and metabolism. He participated in numerous clinical trials focused on inflammatory bowel disease, gastrointestinal oncology, hepatology, and nutrition.

Amongst others he was awarded the Austrian Cross of Honour for Science and Art, 1st class (2008), Hoechst Prize, the Anton von Eiselsberg Prize and the Dr. Theodor Billroth Prize twice.

Lochs was an active member at the European Society for Parenteral and Enteral Nutrition (ESPEN), the German Society for Gastroenterology (DGVS), the American Gastroenterologic Association (AGA), the German Crohn's Colitis Association (DCCV), the Austrian Society for Internal Medicine, the German Society for Internal Medicine (DGIM), the German Cancer Society, the International Organization of Inflammatory Bowel Disease (IOIBD). He was president of ESPEN, of the German Society for Clinical Nutrition (DGEM) and the Austrian Society for Clinical Nutrition.

Lochs was an honorary member of several medical societies e.g. the Polish Society of Nutrition, the Hungarian Society of Clinical Nutrition, the Czech Medical Purkinje Society.

Lochs was an author of over 250 original publications, 73 reviews and book articles and also editor of several books.

Lochs died on 10 February 2015 in Innsbruck, after a lengthy illness.
