= Franz Mair =

Austrian composer and choral conductor

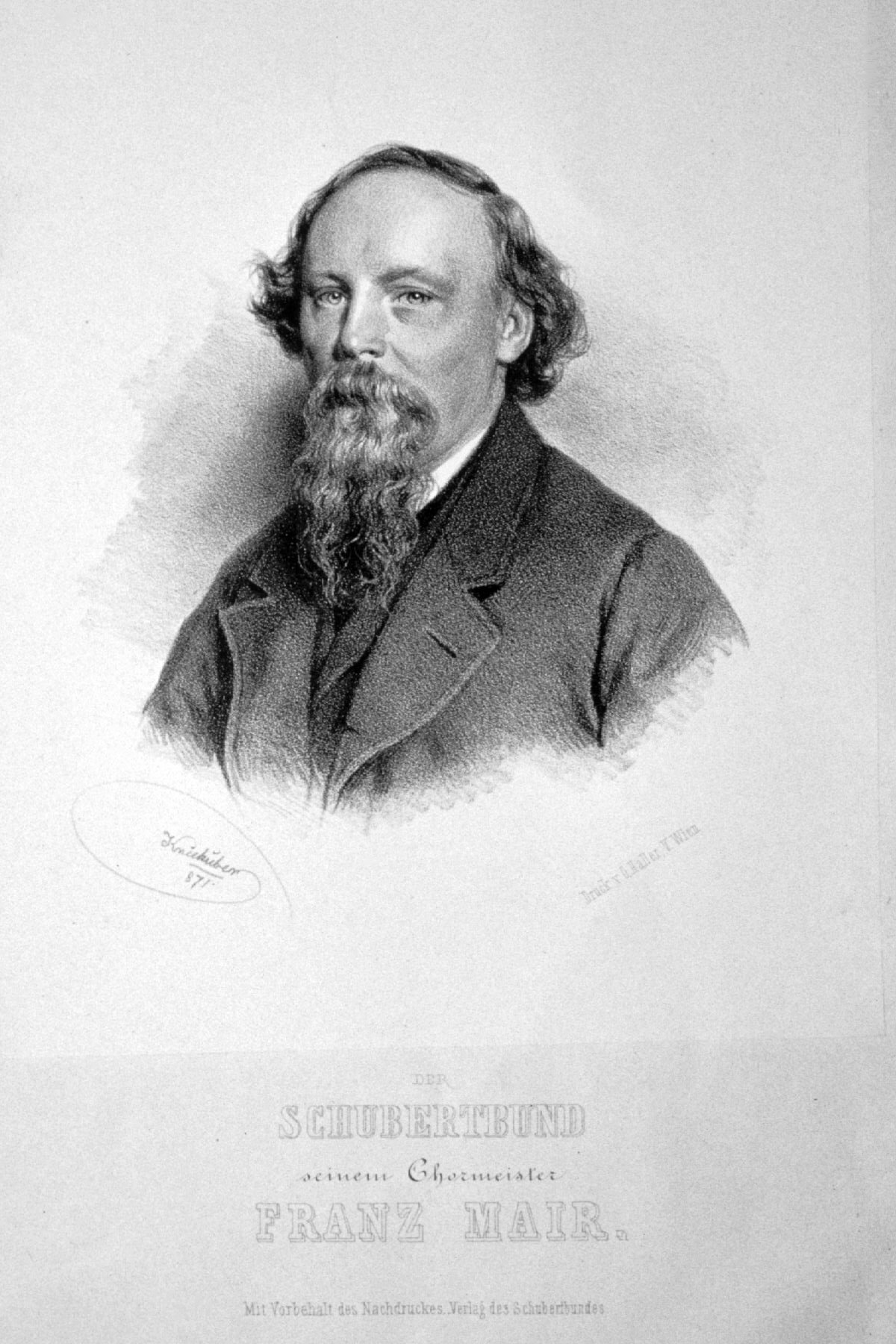
Lithograph by Josef Kriehuber (1871)

Franz Mair (15 March 1821 – 30 November 1893) was an Austrian composer and choral conductor, and founder of the Wiener Schubertbund, a choir that still exists today.

== Life ==
Mair was born in Weikendorf in northeast Austria in 1821, son of a teacher. From 1843 to 1852 he was his father's school assistant; he moved after his father's death to Vienna, where he was a primary school teacher and district school inspector. From 1854 he was a member of the choir Wiener Männergesang-Verein. In 1861 he became assistant director of the choir; he resigned in 1862 after differences with the director Johann von Herbeck. From 1858 to 1861 he was assistant director of the newly founded Wiener Singakademie.

In 1863 he founded in Vienna the Lehrersängerchor Schubertbund ("the teachers' choral Schubert society"). It was originally affiliated to a teachers' association, to which its 86 founding members belonged. The reference to Franz Schubert was significant in that Schubert was from a family of teachers, himself having been at one time a teacher. In 1870 the choir left the teachers' association, and was renamed Schubertbund. (In 1922, to distinguish the choir from others with a similar name, it became the Wiener Schubertbund.)

He directed the choir until 1890. From 1867 to 1874 and from 1879 to 1890 he was director of the Singer's Association of Lower Austria. Mair died in Vienna in 1893.

== Compositions ==
Works include music for the stage, works for choir with orchestra, songs, piano works and chamber music.
