= Viktor Keldorfer =

Austrian conductor (1873–1959)

Viktor Josef Keldorfer (14 April 1873 – 28 January 1959) was an Austrian conductor of male voice choirs, in particular from 1922 to 1954 of the Wiener Schubertbund, and was a chairman of choir associations.

== Life ==
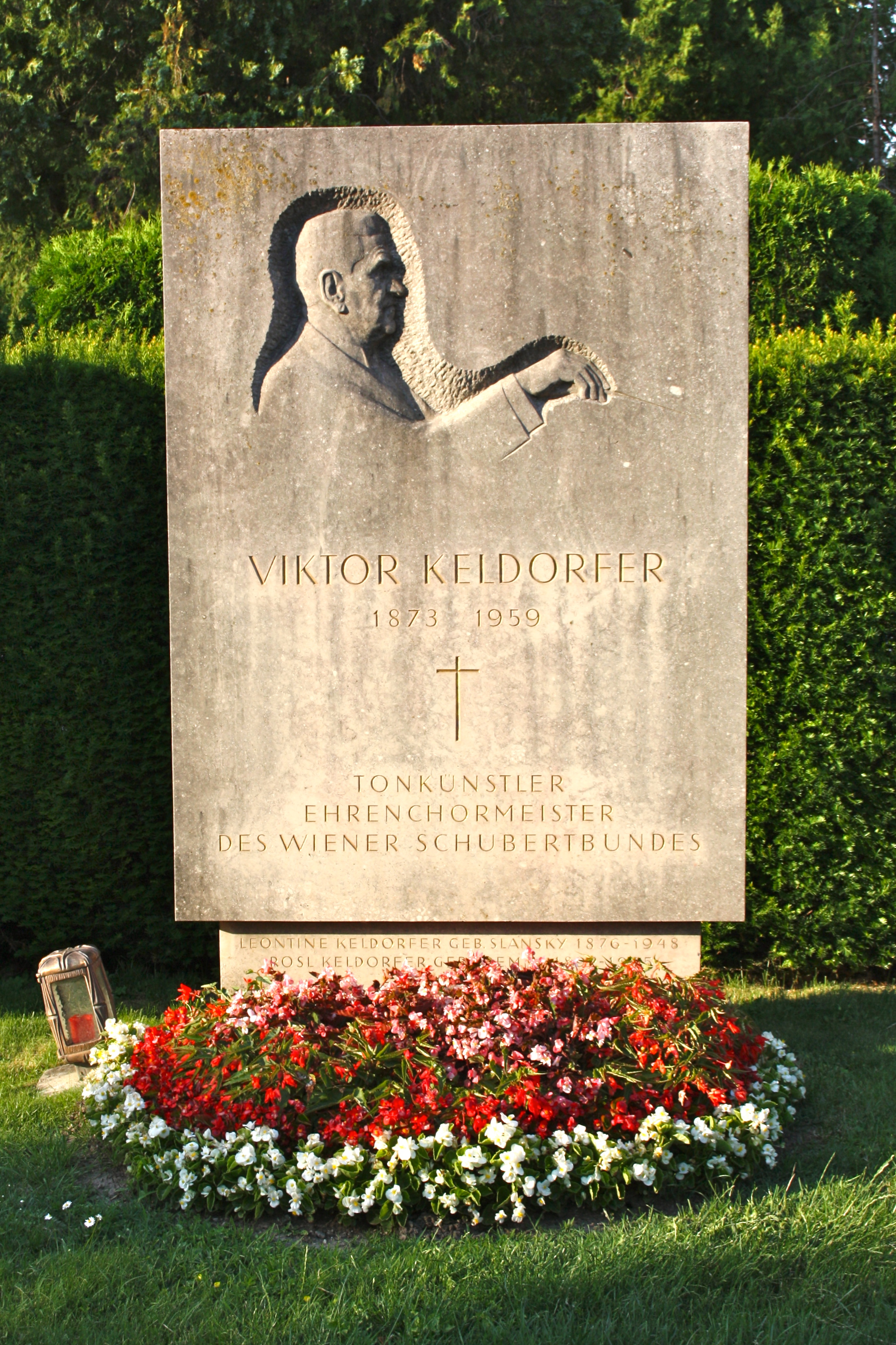
Grave of Viktor Keldorfer at the Vienna Central Cemetery

Keldorfer was born in Salzburg in 1871, one of 21 children of Joseph Keldorfer, head of police supervision, and his wife Antonie, daughter of the painter Sebastian Stief. Viktor Keldorfer, like his brothers, sang as a boy in the choir of the Franciscan Church, Salzburg, of which his father is thought to have been a conductor. He later attended teacher training college and the Mozarteum University in Salzburg.

He moved to Vienna in 1892, where he was a primary school teacher, and in the following year joined the Wiener Männergesang-Verein ("Vienna Male Voice Choir"). From 1897 to 1909 he was director of the Favoriten Männergesang-Verein. He succeeded Eduard Kremser as director of the Wiener Männergesang-Verein in 1910, remaining director until 1921.

In 1922 he became director of the Wiener Schubertbund. The choir gave the first performance of Die Tageszeiten by Richard Strauss in 1928. In that year Keldorfer was committee chairman of the 10th festival of German choir associations, when he conducted a choir of 40,000 singers. From 1910 to 1938 he was director of the Ostmärkischer Sängerbund ("Ostmark Choir Association").

During the Nazi era he was banned from performing, afterwards resuming as director of the Wiener Schubertbund until 1954. From 1949 to 1951 he was the first chairman of the music committee of the Austrian Choir Association. He was often a juror at singing festivals and competitions. Keldorfer died in Vienna in 1959.

== Publications and compositions ==
Keldorfer published editions of works by Johann Strauss II, Josef Strauss and Anton Bruckner, and in 1928 published the first complete edition of the works for male voice choir by Franz Schubert. He also composed works for a cappella men's choir.

== Family ==
His son Robert Keldorfer (1901–1980) was a pianist, composer and conductor. From 1930 to 1939 he was director of the Bruckner Conservatory (now the Anton Bruckner Private University) in Linz; from 1941 to 1966 he was director of the Carinthian State Conservatory (now the Gustav Mahler Privatuniversität für Musik) in Klagenfurt.
