= Guido Mancusi =

Austrian-Italian composer and conductor

Guido Mancusi (born 14 June 1966) is an Austrian-Italian conductor and composer.

== Life ==
Born in Portici near Naples, Mancusi was the son of the Neapolitan conductor Enrico Mancusi and the Viennese singing teacher Ines Mancusi and grew up in Naples and Padua. He received his first piano lessons from his father, who was a close friend of the composer Nino Rota. After his father's early death, his mother decided to return to her hometown of Vienna with her two children.

Mancusi became boy soprano with the Vienna Boys' Choir. After the Matura at the Musikgymnasium Wien, he began studies in bassoon and singing at the Konservatorium der Stadt Wien. During his school years he became a member of the Catholic secondary school fraternity K. Ö. St. V. Frankonia zu Wien, to which he still belongs today. Studies followed at the Vienna Academy of Music in composition with Erich Urbanner and conducting with Karl Österreicher, he received diplomas with distinction. In 1992, he became magister artium with a thesis on Paul Hindemith and founded the Baroque Ensemble Vindobona. First engagements led the Kapellmeister to the Landestheater Niederösterreich in St. Pölten and Coburg, to the Raimundtheater and the Theater an der Wien. At the same time, he assisted Ádám Fischer, Riccardo Muti at La Scala and at the Bayreuth Festival. Later followed engagements at the opera houses in Graz and Kiel. He is the winner of the 1991 Mozart Medal for the best Mozart interpretation.

Mancusi was artistic director of the Operklosterneuburg festival, and since 1998, he has been chief conductor of the Schloss Schönbrunn Orchester Vienna with a focus on classical music.

He has conducted at the Wiener Festwochen, the KlangBogen Wien, as well as in England, Argentina, Japan and the USA. He was also guest conductor of the Budapest Concert Orchestra and the Slovak Philharmonic, followed by invitations to Burgos, Tel Aviv, Rome, Stockholm, Helsinki, Montevideo and Moscow, as well as with the Philharmonic Orchestras in Copenhagen, Ljubljana and Toronto. He conducted premieres as a guest at the Wiener Kammeroper, the Schauspielhaus Wien, as well as the Stadttheater Klagenfurt, the Wiener Volksoper, at the Theater Erfurt and the Israeli Opera Tel Aviv. He was chief conductor at the Stadttheater Klagenfurt from 2001 to 2007. He was a juror at the "concorso internazionale di canto: Riccardo Zandonai", the world premiere of the oratorio Mother Earth at the Wiener Musikverein and the "National Children's Music Competition" on ORF.

Mancusi is the musical director and conductor of the Volksoper Wien. There he conducted, among others, the operas The Magic Flute, Hänsel und Gretel, The Adventures of Pinocchio and the operettas Countess Mariza, The Merry Widow, Die Csárdásfürstin, Die Fledermaus, Der Bettelstudent and Meine Schwester und ich. Mancusi also conducted the People's Opera Orchestra in the ballets Carmen, Le Concours, Carmina Burana/Prélude à l'après-midi d'un faune/Boléro and Cendrillon.

In addition to his work as an opera conductor, he is a professor at the Musik und Kunst Privatuniversität der Stadt Wien.

In 2016, Mancusi conducted Verdi's Messa da Requiem with the Musikgymnasium Wien.

== Compositions ==
Choral and orchestral works

- Oratorium: "Die Mutter Erde" (1990/1991)
- Missa Brevis (1997)
- Passio Domini secundum Joannem (Johannespassion), for six soloists, chorus, and percussion (2011)
- Mors est ianua Vitae, a Requiem for baritone, chorus and orchestra (2011)

Chamber music

- Brass Quintet (1981)
- Happy Birthday, for double bass quartet (1989)
- Cello Sonata No. 1 (1992)
- Trio for flute, viola, and harp (1993)
- Frenulum Breve, String Quartet (1995)
- La Lepre e il Riccio (Der Hase und der Igel), for two violas (2006)
- Cello Sonata No. 2 (2011)

Orchestral music

- Konzert für Schlagwerk und Kammerorchester (1986)
- "BeAeSeF", a suite for string orchestra (1988)
- Trumpet Concerto (1988)
- Concerto for Orchestra (1993)
- Tonspiele, a festive overture for orchestra (2015)

Stage work

- One Night Stand, ballet (1995)
- Sachen, ballet (1996)
- Der Traummann, an operetta after Oscar Wilde (2009/10)
- Der Gläserne Birnbaum (2010)
- In Gottes Namen (2012/13)
- Über meinen Schwager, später - ossia Kowalski, a "Quasi-Operetta" in two acts, libretto written by Marcus Everding (2016/2021)
- Anton und Maria, a children's operetta (2020)

Choral music

- Neun Martialische Motetten (1984–2005)

Film music

- Das Inferno der Planeten (1983)
- Invasion der Verdammten (1984)
- I Cranici dell´Ibico (1986)
- Borderline (1987)
- Unternehmen Columbia (1987)
- Leonhard (1988)

Lieder

- Das Kind (1988)
- Acht Liebeslieder (2006)

== Awards ==
- 1st prize at the International Music Festival - Tokyo
- 1st prize at the International Composition Competition Franz Schubert - Vienna
- 1st prize Interpretation Prize at the International Composition Competition Franz Schubert
- 2nd prize at the International Choir Competition Marktoberdorf in Allgäu

== Recording ==
- Der Abendhimmel F-Dur, WAB 56, Musik, du himmlisches Gebilde! – CD: ORF CD 73, 1995
- Schubert: Nachtgesang im Walde, CD, Decca Music Group Limited 2017
- Complete Mozart edition, Arias, Lieder, Notturni, Decca Music Group Limited CD 2000
- From Vienna with Love, Conchita Wurst, Wiener Symphoniker, Sony, 2018
