= Os justi (Bruckner) =

1879 motet composed by Anton Bruckner

Os Justi
- Motet by Anton Bruckner
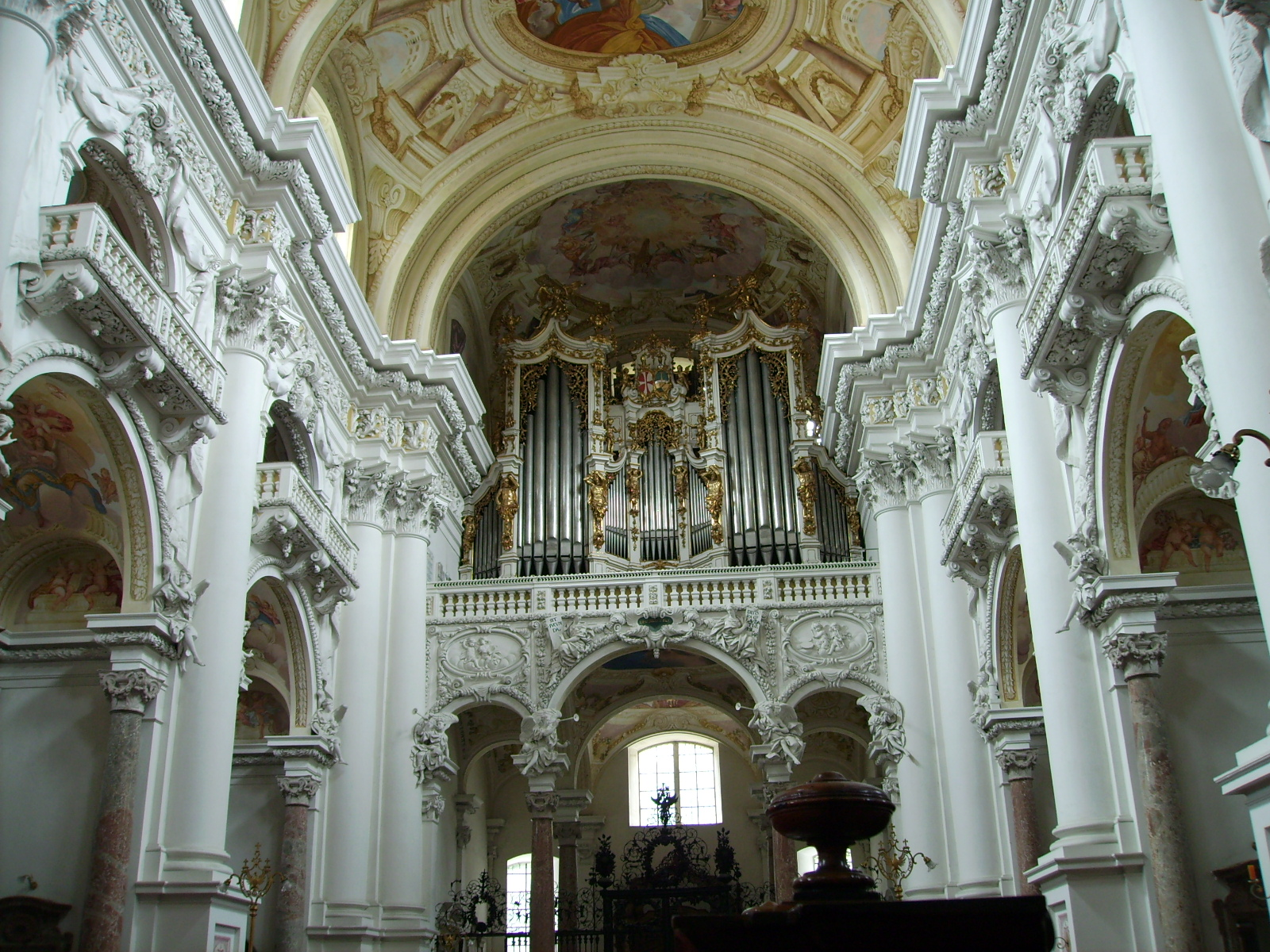
- Interior of St. Florian Abbey, where the dedicatee was choir master
- Key: F Lydian mode
- Catalogue: WAB 30
- Form: Gradual
- Language: Latin
- Composed: 18 July 1879: Vienna
- Dedication: Ignaz Traumihler
- Published: 1886: Vienna
- Vocal: SATB choir
- Instrumental: Organ (verse Inveni David)

Os justi ('The mouth of the righteous'), WAB 30, is a sacred motet composed by Anton Bruckner in 1879. Os justi is a Gregorian chant used as gradual of the Commune Doctorum, and as introit I and gradual II of the Commune Confessoris non Pontificis.

== History ==
Bruckner composed this gradual on 18 July 1879 and dedicated it to Ignaz Traumihler, choirmaster of St. Florian Abbey.

When Traumihler saw the manuscript, he asked: "Ist's der ganze Text?" (Is this the whole text?) Therefore, Bruckner added on 28 July 1879 a verse Inveni David in a Gregorian mode followed by a repeat of the Alleluja.

While the first performance was expected on Traumihler's name-day (31 July 1879), it finally occurred four weeks later on 28 August 1879 on the feast of Saint Augustinus. Traumihler conducted while Bruckner played the organ.

In addition to the manuscript of 18 July 1879 (WAB 30,1), there is a revised manuscript of August 1879 (WAB 30,2).

The work was first edited by Theodor Rättig, Vienna in 1886, together with three other graduals: Locus iste, Christus factus est and Virga Jesse. This first edition did not include the extra verse (Inveni David) and the repeat of the Alleluja. The verse and the repeat of the Alleluja were classified by Grasberger as a separate work (Inveni David, WAB 20). Both the first edition and the MWV edition are based on the revised manuscript of August 1879.

The only edition of the first version is a facsimile of the manuscript of 18 July 1879 by A. Göllerich.

The completed setting with the extra verse (Inveni David) and the repeat of the Alleluja – the manuscripts of which are archived at the Österreichische Nationalbibliothek – is put in Band XXI/28 of the Gesamtausgabe.

== Text and music ==
The text of the motet is two verses of Psalm 37, which is Psalm 36 in the Vulgata (Psalms 37:30–31). The text of the added verse is taken from Psalm 89 (Psalms 89:20).

Os justi meditabitur sapientiam:
et lingua ejus loquetur judicium.
Lex Dei ejus in corde ipsius:
et non supplantabuntur gressus ejus.
Alleluia.
Inveni David servum meum,
oleo sancto meo unxi eum.
Alleluia.

The mouth of the righteous utters wisdom,
and his tongue speaks what is just.
The law of his God is in his heart:
and his feet do not falter.
Alleluia.
I have found David, my servant;
I have anointed him with my holy oil.
Alleluia.

The original work of 18 July 1879, a 69-bar gradual, is scored in Lydian mode for choir a cappella. On two occasions (bars 9–13 and 51–56) the choir is divided into eight voices. The second part on "Et lingua ejus" (bars 16–42) is a fugato without any alteration. The last sentence, on "et non supplantabuntur" (bars 65-69), is sung pianissimo by the soprano, on a sustained tonic chord by the five other voices (ATTBB). It is followed by a two-bar unison Alleluja in Ionian mode.

On 28 July 1879, Bruckner added an extra verse Inveni David scored for unison male voices with organ accompaniment, and a repeat of the 2-bar Alleluja. According to Elisabeth Maier the melody of the Alleluja is a quote of the Alleluja of the introit In medio ecclesiae of the Missa de Doctoribus. The extra verse is apparently Bruckner's own composition.

Traumihler was a fervent supporter of the Cecilian Movement; the reason why Bruckner composed this motet in Lydian mode, without any alteration in the key and in the whole score, and with large use of unaltered chords.

== Selected discography ==
=== Version 1 (18 July 1879) ===
There is a single recording of the first version of Os justi:

- Mario Aschauer conducting the Harmonia Stellarum: Premiere of the first version, 29 January 2025

=== Version 2 (August 1879) ===
The first recording of Os justi occurred in 1931:

- Ludwig Berberich, Münchner Domchor – 78 rpm: Christschall 141

The large majority of the recordings, sometimes without Alleluja, do not include the verse Inveni David. A selection among the about 120 recordings:

- George Guest, St. John's College Choir Cambridge, The World of St. John's 1958–1977 – LP: Argo ZRG 760, 1973
- Matthew Best, Corydon Singers, Bruckner: Motets – CD: Hyperion CDA66062, 1982
- Elmar Hausmann, Capella Vocale St. Aposteln Köln, Anton Bruckner, Missa solemnis in B, Motetten – LP: Aulos AUL 53 569, 1983
- Wolfgang Schäfer, Freiburg Vocal Ensemble, Anton Bruckner: Motetten – CD: Christophorus 74 501, 1984
- Philippe Herreweghe, la Chapelle Royale/Collegium Vocale, Ensemble Musique Oblique, Bruckner: Messe en mi mineur; Motets – CD: Harmonia Mundi France HMC 901322, 1989
- Joseph Pancik, Prager Kammerchor, Anton Bruckner: Motetten / Choral-Messe – CD: Orfeo C 327 951 A, 1993
- John Eliot Gardiner, Monteverdi Choir, Bruckner: Mass No. 1; Motets – CD: DG 459 674-2, 1998
- Hans-Christoph Rademann, NDR Chor Hamburg, Anton Bruckner: Ave Maria – Carus 83.151, 2000
- Petr Fiala, Czech Philharmonic Choir, Anton Bruckner: Motets – CD: MDG 322 1422-2, 2006
- Marcus Creed, SWR Symphony Orchestra and Stuttgart-Radio Vocal Ensemble, Mass in E minor and Motets – CD: Hänssler Classic SACD 93.199, 2007
- Stephen Layton, Polyphony Choir, Bruckner: Mass in E minor & Motets – CD: Hyperion CDA 67629, 2007
- Erwin Ortner, Arnold Schoenberg Chor, Anton Bruckner: Tantum ergo – CD: ASC Edition 3, issue of the choir, 2008
- Philipp Ahmann, MDR Rundfunkchor Leipzig, Anton Bruckner & Michael Haydn - Motets – SACD: Pentatone PTC 5186 868, 2021

There are only a few recordings, which include the verse Inveni David:

- Robert Jones, Choir of St. Bride's Church, Bruckner: Motets – CD: Naxos 8.550956, 1994
- Rupert Huber, Südfunkchor Stuttgart, Romantische Chormusik – CD: Hänssler 91 106, 1996; also on YouTube - verse transcribed for mixed choir and sung a cappella
- Duncan Ferguson, Choir of St. Mary's Cathedral of Edinburgh, Bruckner: Motets – CD: Delphian Records DCD34071, 2010
- Kevin M. Clarke, Chorus Regi Cantorum, Houston, on Bruckner - Bicentennial Houston CD (St John Vianney Roman Catholic Church, Houston, 11 October 2024) – CD BSA-007

== Sources ==
- Max Auer, Anton Bruckner als Kirchenmusiker, G. Bosse, Regensburg, 1927
- Anton Bruckner – Sämtliche Werke, Band XXI: Kleine Kirchenmusikwerke, Musikwissenschaftlicher Verlag der Internationalen Bruckner-Gesellschaft, Hans Bauernfeind and Leopold Nowak (Editor), Vienna, 1984/2001
- Uwe Harten, Anton Bruckner. Ein Handbuch, Residenz Verlag, Salzburg, 1996, ISBN 3-7017-1030-9
- Cornelis van Zwol, Anton Bruckner 1824–1896 – Leven en werken, uitg. Thoth, Bussum, Netherlands, 2012. ISBN 978-90-6868-590-9
