= Vexilla regis (Bruckner) =

1892 motet composed by Anton Bruckner

- Motet by Anton Bruckner
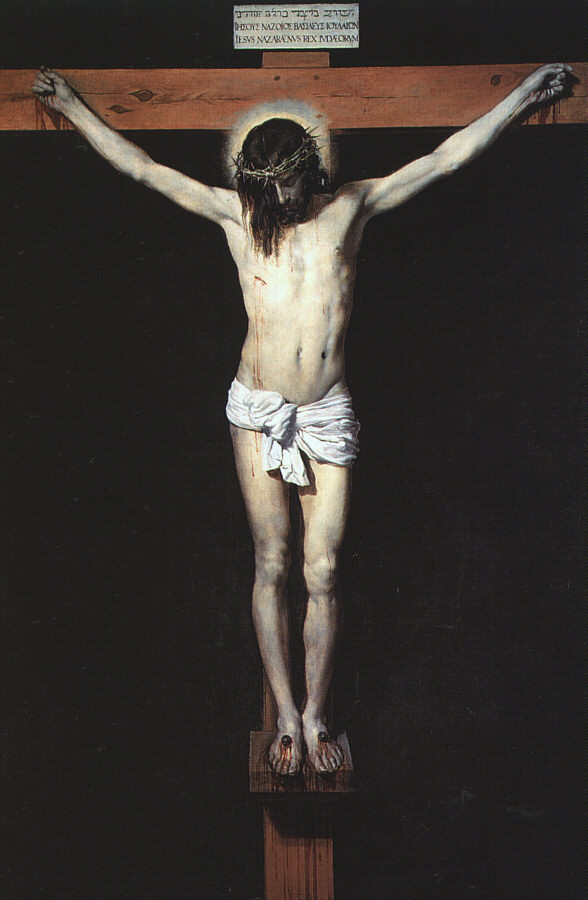
- Crucifixion by Velázquez
- Key: Phrygian mode
- Catalogue: WAB 51
- Text: Vexilla regis
- Language: Latin
- Performed: 15 April 1892: Vienna
- Published: 1892: Vienna
- Vocal: SATB choir

Vexilla regis (The royal banner), WAB 51, is the final motet written by the Austrian composer Anton Bruckner.

== History ==
Bruckner composed it on 9 February 1892. The work, the manuscript of which is archived at the Österreichische Nationalbibliothek, is based on the Latin hymn Vexilla Regis by Venantius Fortunatus. In his letter of 7 March 1892 to Bernhard Deubler, Bruckner wrote that he had composed this work "according to a pure impulse of the heart". The work was first performed on Good Friday, 15 April 1892, and was published in the same year by Josef Weinberger, ViennaIn the Album der Wiener Meister. A Reminder of the International Exhibition of Music and Theatre.

For his 1939 edition of Bruckner's motets published by Peters, Ludwig Berberich was inspired by the edition that Wöss had published in 1914 with Universal Edition. Wöss had been inspired by the first edition, which contained only the first verse of the motet, and had not consulted the manuscripts. In his edition, Wöss has, in accordance with the choral reforms under Pius X, used the old text of the Vexilla Regis and took into account the accompaniment of the penultimate and last strophes. He used the appropriate prosody and included the concluding Amen, which Bruckner had not set to music. From then on, the work was considered to be only tri-strophic.

In the Nowak-Bauernfeind new edition (Band XXI/29 of the Gesamtausgabe) the motet was re-issued with the seven strophes of Bruckner's original manuscript, with a final four-bar Amen.

== Music ==
Bruckner put the seven strophes of the text in a motet for mixed choir a cappella.

On the left side of the manuscript, Bruckner notated the work a first time, underscoring the text of strophes 1-3, and wrote down the text of strophes 4-5 without music. On the right side, Bruckner wrote out the score again, underscored by the text of strophes 6-7. Bruckner set the liturgical version of his composition, which was customary at the time. The Nowak edition reflects this correctly.

Alike he did in Christus factus est WAB 11 and Virga Jesse WAB 52, Bruckner used the Dresdner Amen on the words prodeunt (bars 5–8), unica (bars 41–44), and Trinitas (bars 77–80).

Although it is in Phrygian mode the motet is characterized by Bruckner's typical modulations, often to rather distant keys and the integration of diverse musical styles: Bruckner biographer Howie remarks that "the remarkable mixture of the old and the new in this strophic piece could perhaps be interpreted as an attempt to sum up [Bruckner's] life's work". Its "bleaker and uncompromising" close is suited to the Good Friday story.

== Selected discography ==
Most performances and recordings of the motet contain only three strophes with Venantius Fortunatus’ ancient text, according to Berberich's edition. Only a few recordings reproduce the score that Bruckner had actually set to music.

The first recording of Bruckner's Vexilla regis occurred in 1931:

- Ferdinand Habel with the Choir of the St. Stephans-Dom, Vienna (78 rpm: Christschall 130A)

A selection among the about 40 recordings:

- Eugen Jochum, Bavarian Radio Symphony Orchestra & Choir, Bruckner: Symphony No. 7, Psalm 150, Motets – LP: DG 139137/8, 1966
- Matthew Best, Corydon Singers, Bruckner: Motets – CD: Hyperion CDA66062, 1982
- Philippe Herreweghe, la Chapelle Royale/Collegium Vocale, Ensemble Musique Oblique, Bruckner: Messe en mi mineur; Motets – CD: Harmonia Mundi France HMC 901322, 1989
- Uwe Gronostay, Netherlands Chamber Choir, Bruckner/Reger – CD: Globe GLO 5160, 1995
- Magnar Mangersnes, Domchor Bergen, Bruckner: Motets – CD: Simax PSC 9037, 1996
- Dan-Olof Stenlund, Malmö Kammarkör, Bruckner: Ausgewählte Werke – CD: Malmö Kammarkör MKKCD 051, 2004
- Petr Fiala, Tschechischer Philharmonischer Chor Brno, Anton Bruckner: Motets – CD: MDG 322 1422–2, 2006
- Philipp Ahmann, MDR Rundfunkchor Leipzig, Anton Bruckner & Michael Haydn - Motets – SACD: Pentatone PTC 5186 868, 2021

Only a few recent recordings are using the score of the current edition of the Gesamtausgabe:

- Hans-Christoph Rademann, NDR Chor Hamburg, Anton Bruckner: Ave Maria – Carus 83.151, 2000
- Erwin Ortner, Arnold Schoenberg Chor, Anton Bruckner: Tantum ergo – CD: ASC Edition 3, issue of the choir, 2008
- Philipp von Steinäcker, Vocalensemble Musica Saeculorum, Bruckner: Pange lingua - Motetten - CD: Fra Bernardo FB 1501271, 2015 – with final Amen
- Michael Grohotolsky, Wiener Kammerchor, O crux - Chormusik zur Passions- und Osterzeit aus fünf Jahrhunderten – CD : Helbling LC-29714, 2015

== Sources ==
- Max Auer, Anton Bruckner als Kirchenmusiker, G. Bosse, Regensburg, 1927
- Anton Bruckner – Sämtliche Werke, Band XXI: Kleine Kirchenmusikwerke, Musikwissenschaftlicher Verlag der Internationalen Bruckner-Gesellschaft, Hans Bauernfeind and Leopold Nowak (Editors), Vienna, 1984/2001
- Anton Bruckner – Sämtliche Werke, Band XXIV: Briefe, Band II, 1887-1896, Musikwissenschaftlicher Verlag der Internationalen Bruckner-Gesellschaft, Andrea Harrandt et Otto Schneider (†) (Editors), Vienna, 2003
- Cornelis van Zwol, Anton Bruckner 1824–1896 – Leven en werken, uitg. Thoth, Bussum, Netherlands, 2012. ISBN 978-90-6868-590-9
- Uwe Harten, Anton Bruckner. Ein Handbuch. Residenz Verlag, Salzburg, 1996. ISBN 3-7017-1030-9
- Felix Diergarten, Anton Bruckner. Das geistliche Werk, Salzbourg, 2023. ISBN 978-3-99014-248-6
