= Virga Jesse (Bruckner) =

1885 motet composed by Anton Bruckner

- Motet by Anton Bruckner
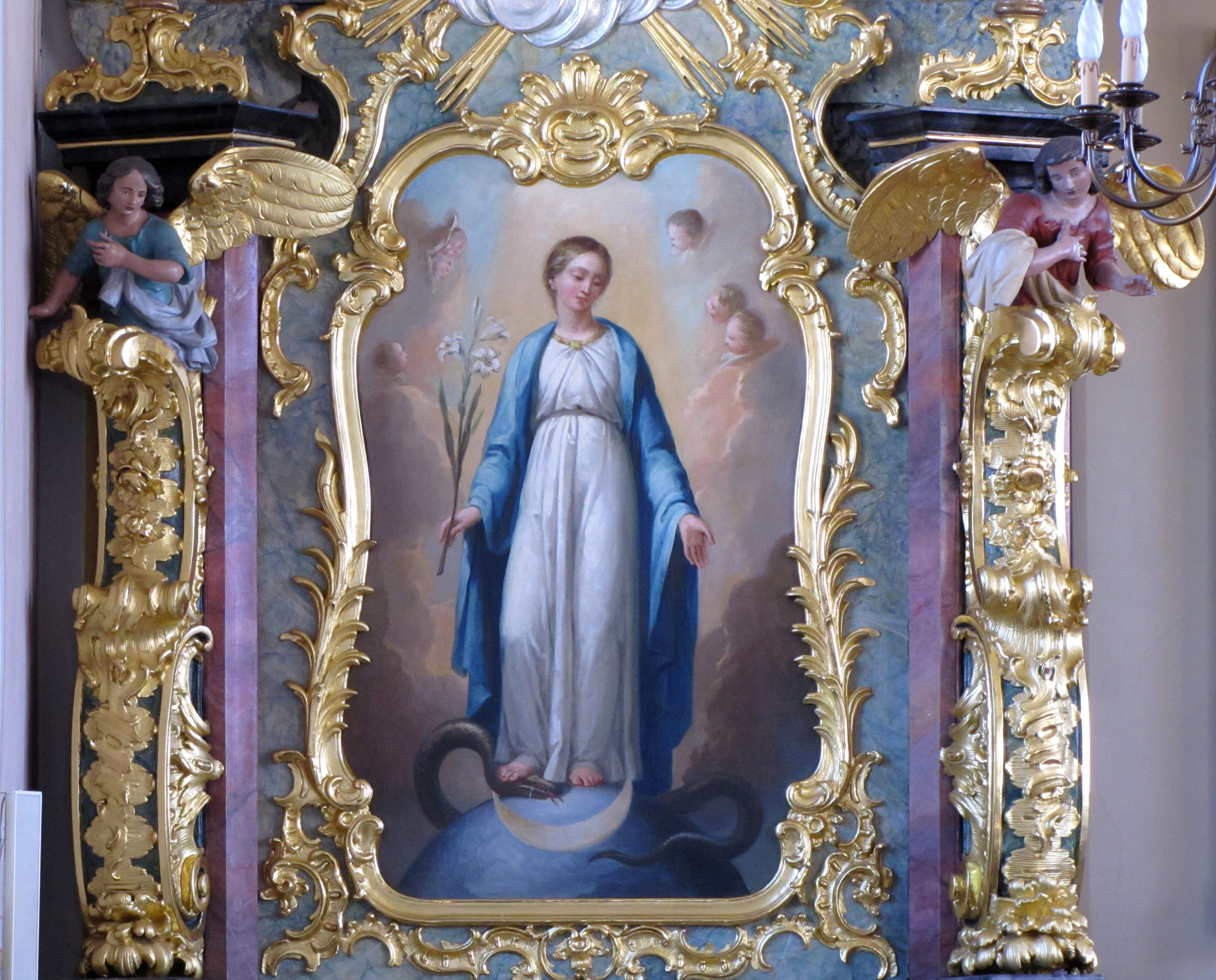
- Immaculate Conception (Wintershouse)
- Key: E minor
- Catalogue: WAB 52
- Form: Gradual
- Text: Virga Jesse floruit
- Language: Latin
- Dedication: 100th anniversary of the Linz diocese
- Performed: 8 December 1885: Vienna
- Published: 1896: Vienna
- Vocal: SATB choir

Virga Jesse (The branch from Jesse), WAB 52, is a motet by the Austrian composer Anton Bruckner. It sets the gradual Virga Jesse floruit for unaccompanied mixed choir.

== History ==
The work was completed on 3 September 1885 and may have been intended for the celebration of the one-hundredth anniversary of the Linz diocese; however, like the Ecce sacerdos magnus that Bruckner composed A.M.D.G. for that event, it was not performed there. It was performed on 8 December 1885 in the Wiener Hofmusikkapelle for the Feast of the Immaculate Conception.

The original manuscript is archived at the Österreichische Nationalbibliothek, and transcriptions of it at the Hofmusikkapelle and the Abbey of Kremsmünster. The motet was edited together with three other graduals (Locus iste WAB 23, Christus factus est WAB 11, and Os justi WAB 30), by Theodor Rättig, Vienna in 1886. The motet is put in Band XXI/34 of the Gesamtausgabe.

== Setting ==
This 91-bar gradual in E minor is for mixed choir a cappella. In the first part on the verse Virga jesse floruit (bars 1-20) Bruckner used twice the Dresdner Amen on the word floruit (bars 7-9 and 17-19). The last part (bars 63-91) consists, as in the earlier Inveni David WAB 19, of an Alleluja, for which Bruckner drew his inspiration from the Hallelujah of Händel's Messiah, on which he often improvised on organ. The motet ends in pianissimo by the tenor voice on a pedal point.

Max Auer regards it as the most accomplished and magnificent a cappella motet of the composer. The Bruckner biographer Howie also calls this work "one of Bruckner's finest motets".

== Selected discography ==
The first recording of Bruckner's Vexilla regis occurred in 1931:

- Ferdinand Habel with the Choir of the St. Stephans-Dom, Vienna (78 rpm: Christschall 129)

A selection among the about 80 recordings:

- John Alldis, John Alldis Choir, Bruckner, Messiaen, Debussy, Schönberg – LP: Argo ZRG 523, 1967
- Norbert Balatsch, Wiener Staatsopernchor, 50 Jahre Konzertvereinigung Wiener Staatsopernchor – LP: Preiser SPR3278, 1976
- Matthew Best, Corydon Singers, Bruckner: Motets – CD: Hyperion CDA66062, 1982
- Frieder Bernius, Kammerchor Stuttgart, Bruckner: Mass in E minor; Ave Maria; Christus factus est; Locus iste; Virga Jesse – CD: Sony CL SK 48037, 1991
- Joseph Pancik, Prager Kammerchor, Anton Bruckner: Motetten / Choral-Messe – CD: Orfeo C 327 951 A, 1993
- Uwe Gronostay, Netherlands Chamber Choir, Bruckner/Reger – CD: Globe GLO 5160, 1995
- Peter Dijkstra, Chor des Bayerischen Rundfunks, Machet die Tore weit – CD: Oehms Classics OC 535, 2005
- Marcus Creed, SWR Symphony Orchestra and Stuttgart-Radio Vocal Ensemble, Mass in E minor and Motets – CD: Hänssler Classic SACD 93.199, 2007
- Stephen Layton, Polyphony Choir, Bruckner: Mass in E minor & Motets – CD: Hyperion CDA 67629, 2007
- Erwin Ortner, Arnold Schoenberg Chor, Anton Bruckner: Tantum ergo – CD: ASC Edition 3, issue of the choir, 2008
- Philipp Ahmann, MDR Rundfunkchor Leipzig, Anton Bruckner & Michael Haydn - Motets – SACD: Pentatone PTC 5186 868, 2021

== Sources ==
- Max Auer, Anton Bruckner als Kirchenmusiker, G. Bosse, Regensburg, 1927
- Anton Bruckner – Sämtliche Werke, Band XXI: Kleine Kirchenmusikwerke, Musikwissenschaftlicher Verlag der Internationalen Bruckner-Gesellschaft, Hans Bauernfeind and Leopold Nowak (Editor), Vienna, 1984/2001
- Cornelis van Zwol, Anton Bruckner 1824–1896 – Leven en werken, uitg. Thoth, Bussum, Netherlands, 2012. ISBN 978-90-6868-590-9
- Uwe Harten, Anton Bruckner. Ein Handbuch. Residenz Verlag, Salzburg, 1996. ISBN 3-7017-1030-9
