= Ave Maria (Bruckner) =

1861 motet composed by Anton Bruckner

- Motet by Anton Bruckner
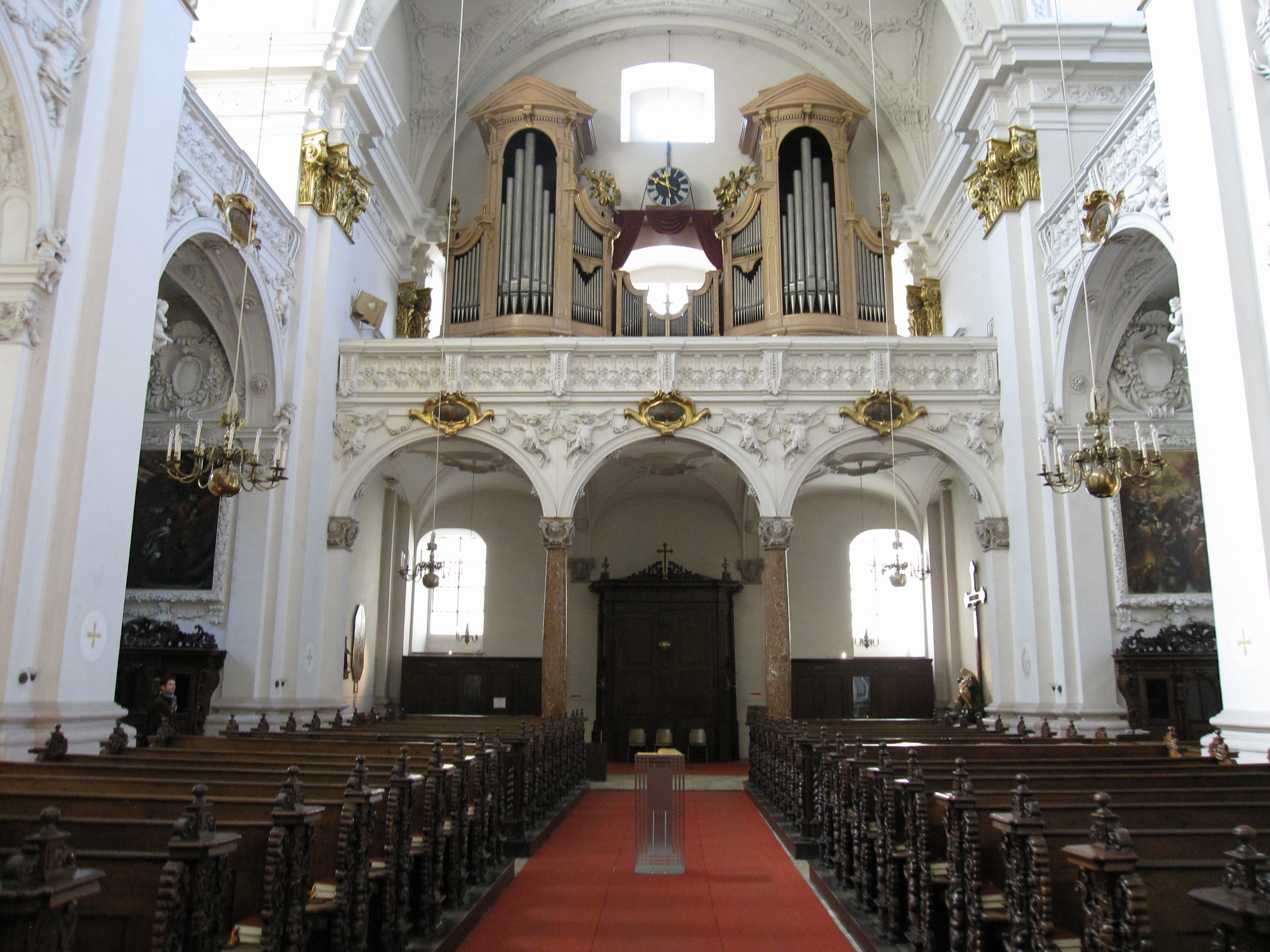
- The organ loft in the old Linz Cathedral
- Key: F major
- Catalogue: WAB 6
- Form: Marian hymn
- Text: Ave Maria
- Language: Latin
- Performed: 12 May 1861: Linz
- Published: 1867: Vienna
- Scoring: SAATTBB choir

Audio sample
- Ave Maria, performed by United States Navy Band's Sea Chanters ensemble: file; help

Ave Maria (Hail Mary), WAB 6, is a sacred motet by Anton Bruckner, a setting of the Latin prayer Ave Maria. He composed it in Linz in 1861 and scored the short work in F major for seven unaccompanied voices. The piece, sometimes named an Offertorium, was published in Vienna in 1867. Before, Bruckner composed the same prayer in 1856 for soprano, alto, a four-part mixed choir, organ and cello, WAB 5. Later, he set the text in 1882 for a solo voice (alto) and keyboard (organ, piano or harmonium), WAB 7.

== History ==
Bruckner composed the motet, also known as Ave Maria II, in 1861. He did this after completing five years of studies with Simon Sechter. The motet was first performed on 12 May 1861 as Offertorium of a mass in the Linz Cathedral (now the Old Cathedral). Bruckner was their organist and was also from 1860 director of the Liedertafel (choral society) "Frohsinn" who performed the motet to celebrate the anniversary of its founding. Bruckner wrote in a letter about the reception in a letter dated 3 October 1861: "I was, in the end, splendidly applauded by my choir—twice."

The manuscript is lost, but copies are found in the archive of the Österreichische Nationalbibliothek and the Abbey of Sankt Florian. The piece, sometimes named an Offertorium, was published together with Tota pulchra es by Emil Wetzler in Vienna in 1867. It is put in Band XXI/20 of the Gesamtausgabe.

== Music ==
Bruckner set the prayer in F major and scored it for seven unaccompanied voices SAATTBB. It takes about 4 minutes to perform. The first section of the 51-bar long Ave Maria is based on the Annunciation, the greeting of Gabriel the Archangel to Mary (Luke 1:28) and on the Visitation, when Elisabeth paraphrased the greeting (Luke 1:42). The upper voices begin, while (bar 10) the lower voices respond with "et benedictus ...". All voices united proclaim the name "Jesus" three times in growing intensity (bars 15-20). The second part is for all voices. It begins in canon on "Sancta Maria", and evolves diminuendo with a point d'orgue on bar 30 ("ora pro nobis"), when Mary is asked to "pray for us sinners". Bruckner applies his understanding of older styles to express his personal faith with simplicity but "Romantic sensibility of expression".

James Liu notes about Bruckner's motets in general:

They express his devout Roman Catholic beliefs, using the modal chords and long, Gregorian chant-like lines of the Renaissance masters. But the harmonic shifts and compositional techniques display a clearly Romantic sensibility, and the blocks of contrasting sound display Bruckner's roots as an organ improviser.

== Selected discography ==
The first recording of Bruckner's Ave Maria occurred in the early 1920s:

- Pius Kalt, Choir of the St. Hedwig's Cathedral, 78 rpm: Grammophon J 25010, before 1925

A selection among the about 150 commercial recordings:

- John Alldis, John Alldis Choir, Bruckner, Messiaen, Debussy, Schönberg – LP: Argo ZRG 523, 1967
- Eric Ericson, Schwedischer Rundfunkchor, Treasures – CD: Caprice Records CAP 21814, 1975
- Hans Zanotelli, Philharmonia vocal-ensemble Stuttgart, Anton Bruckner, Lateinische Motetten – CD: Calig CAL 50 477, 1979
- Matthew Best, Corydon Singers, Bruckner: Motets - CD: Hyperion CDA66062, 1982
- Philippe Herreweghe, la Chapelle Royale/Collegium Vocale, Ensemble Musique Oblique, Bruckner: Messe en mi mineur; Motets - CD: Harmonia Mundi France HMC 901322, 1989
- John Rutter, The Cambridge Singers, The Cambridge Singers Collection – CD: Collegium CSCD501, 1991
- Uwe Gronostay, Netherlands Chamber Choir, Bruckner/Reger – CD: Globe GLO 5160, 1995
- Winfried Toll, Frankfurter Kantorei, Der Himmel lacht, die Erde jauchzt – CD: Peters Musikverlag, 2002
- Dan-Olof Stenlund, Malmö Kammarkör, Bruckner: Ausgewählte Werke - CD: Malmö Kammarkör MKKCD 051, 2004
- Peter Dijkstra, Chor des Bayerischen Rundfunks, Machet die Tore weit – CD: Oehms Classics OC 535, 2005
- Petr Fiala, Tschechischer Philharmonischer Chor Brno, Anton Bruckner: Motets - CD: MDG 322 1422-2, 2006
- Michael Stenov, Cantores Carmeli, Benefizkonzert Karmelitenkirche Linz - CD/DVD issued by the choir, 2006, and on YouTube.
- Erwin Ortner, Arnold Schoenberg Chor, Anton Bruckner: Tantum ergo - CD: ASC Edition 3, issue of the choir, 2008
- Tone Bianca Sparre Dahl, Schola Cantorum (Norway), Hymn to the Virgin – CD: Lindberg Lyd 2L-095, 2011
- Otto Kargl, Domkantorei St. Pölten, Cappela Nova Graz, Bruckner: Messe E-Moll, CD: ORF CD 3174, 2013
- Philipp Ahmann, MDR Rundfunkchor Leipzig, Anton Bruckner & Michael Haydn - Motets – SACD: Pentatone PTC 5186 868, 2021

== Sources ==
- Max Auer, Anton Bruckner als Kirchenmusiker, G. Bosse, Regensburg, 1927
- Anton Bruckner - Sämtliche Werke, Band XXI: Kleine Kirchenmusikwerke, Musikwissenschaftlicher Verlag der Internationalen Bruckner-Gesellschaft, Hans Bauernfeind and Leopold Nowak (Editor), Vienna, 1984/2001
- Cornelis van Zwol, Anton Bruckner 1824–1896 - Leven en werken, uitg. Thoth, Bussum, Netherlands, 2012. ISBN 978-90-6868-590-9
- Uwe Harten, Anton Bruckner. Ein Handbuch. Residenz Verlag, Salzburg, 1996. ISBN 3-7017-1030-9
