= Pange lingua, WAB 33 =

1868 motet composed by Anton Bruckner

Pange lingua
- Motet by Anton Bruckner
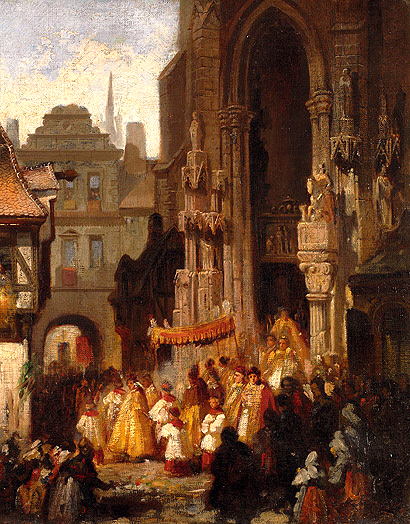
- Fronleichnamsprozession by Carl Emil Doepler
- Key: Phrygian mode
- Catalogue: WAB 33
- Occasion: Corpus Christi
- Text: Pange lingua
- Language: Latin
- Composed: 31 January 1868: Linz
- Published: 1885: Regensburg
- Vocal: SATB choir

Pange lingua (Tell, my tongue), WAB 33, is a sacred motet composed by Anton Bruckner in 1868. It is a setting of the Latin hymn Pange lingua for the celebration of Corpus Christi.

== History ==
Bruckner composed the motet on 31 January 1868 at the end of his stay in Linz. Bruckner’s original intention was to have it performed at the same time as the first performance of his Mass in E minor for the dedication of the votive chapel in Linz, the first part of the New Cathedral. Bruckner heard his work only twenty years later. The first performance occurred on 18 August 1890 (the emperor's birthday) in the Stadtpfarrkiche of Steyr. The manuscript of the motet is archived at the 'Österreichische Nationalbibliothek.

Franz Xaver Witt was a leader of the Cecilian Movement, aiming to restore Catholic church music "to the purity and comparative simplicity of the Palestrinian style". In 1885 he asked Bruckner for a composition to be included in Musica sacra (Regensburg), the movement's journal, in which he issued a transcription of the motet. Witt modified the alto part without Bruckner's agreement, removing "some of the work's more daring harmonies". Ten years later, in 1895, the motet was published in its original setting by Johann Groß, Innsbruck. The motet, which Bruckner called his Lieblings-Tantum ergo (favourite Tantum ergo), is put in Band XXI/22 of the Gesamtausgabe.

== Music ==
The work is a setting of 38 bars in Phrygian mode of the first and last two verses (Tantum ergo) of the Pange lingua for mixed choir a cappella. A 3-bar Amen was added later.

The work, which is composed in the old church mode, begins in unison and evolves via an empty fifth to perfect chords. Max Auer commented: The whole work has much mystic atmosphere and, despite its great simplicity, I would regard it as one of Bruckner's best sacred compositions ("Das ganze Stück ist voll mystischer Stimmung und ich möchte es trotz seiner großen Einfachheit zu den besten von Bruckners kirchlichen Chorwerken zählen").

== Selected discography ==
The first recording occurred in 1965:

- Giulio Bertola, Coro Polifonico Italiano – LP: Angelicum LPA 5989

A selection among the about 30 recordings of the work:

- Eugen Jochum, Chor des Bayerischen Rundfunks, Messe Nr. 2 e-Moll, 2 Motetten – LP: LP: DG 2530 139, 1966
- Joachim Martini, Junge Kantorei, Geistliche Chormusik der Romantik – LP: Schwarzwald MPS 13004, 1970
- George Guest, St. John's College Choir Cambridge, The World of St. John's 1958–1977 – LP: Argo ZRG 760, 1973
- Hans-Christoph Rademann, NDR Chor Hamburg, Anton Bruckner: Ave Maria – Carus 83.151, 2000
- Dan-Olof Stenlund, Malmö Kammarkör, Bruckner: Ausgewählte Werke – CD: Malmö Kammarkör MKKCD 051, 2004
- Stephen Layton, Polyphony Choir, Bruckner: Mass in E minor & Motets – CD: Hyperion CDA 67629, 2007
- Marcus Creed, SWR Symphony Orchestra and Stuttgart-Radio Vocal Ensemble, Mass in E minor and Motets – CD: Hänssler Classic SACD 93.199, 2007
- Erwin Ortner, Arnold Schoenberg Chor, Anton Bruckner: Tantum ergo – CD: ASC Edition 3, issue of the choir, 2008
- Duncan Ferguson, Choir of St. Mary's Cathedral of Edinburgh, Bruckner: Motets – CD: Delphian Records DCD34071, 2010
- Philipp Ahmann, MDR Rundfunkchor Leipzig, Anton Bruckner & Michael Haydn - Motets – SACD: Pentatone PTC 5186 868, 2021

== Sources ==
- Max Auer, Anton Bruckner als Kirchenmusiker, G. Bosse, Regensburg, 1927
- Anton Bruckner – Sämtliche Werke, Band XXI: Kleine Kirchenmusikwerke, Musikwissenschaftlicher Verlag der Internationalen Bruckner-Gesellschaft, Hans Bauernfeind and Leopold Nowak (Editor), Vienna, 1984/2001
- Cornelis van Zwol, Anton Bruckner 1824–1896 – Leven en werken, uitg. Thoth, Bussum, Netherlands, 2012. ISBN 978-90-6868-590-9
- Crawford Howie, Anton Bruckner – A documentary biography, online revised edition
- John Williamson (ed.): The Cambridge Companion to Bruckner Cambridge University Press, 2004, ISBN 0-521-00878-6
