= Ave Maria, WAB 5 =

1856 motet composed by Anton Bruckner

Ave Maria
- Motet by Anton Bruckner
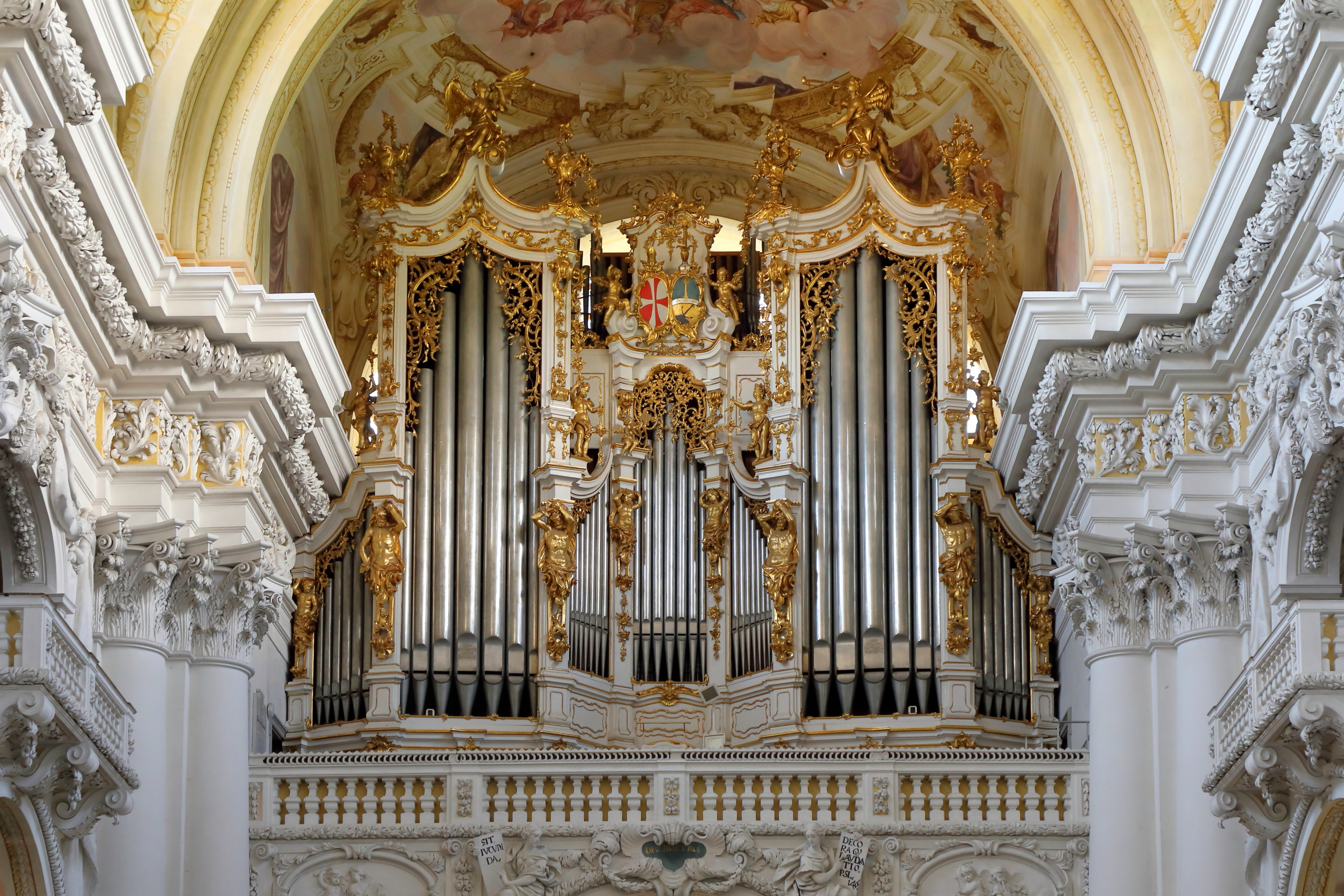
- The organ loft in the St. Florian Abbey
- Key: F major
- Catalogue: WAB 5
- Form: Marian hymn
- Text: Ave Maria
- Language: Latin
- Dedication: Ignaz Traumihler
- Performed: 7 October 1856: Sankt Florian
- Published: 1893: Innsbruck
- Vocal: SATB choir - S and A soloists
- Instrumental: organ and cello

Ave Maria (Hail Mary), WAB 5, is a setting of the Latin prayer Ave Maria by Anton Bruckner.

== History ==
Bruckner composed this motet on 24 July 1856, five years before his more famous motet, as a present for the name-day of Ignaz Traumihler, choirmaster of St. Florian Abbey. The first performance occurred on 7 October 1856 for the Rosenkranzfest (Feast of the Holy Rosary) in Sankt Florian.

The original manuscript is lost, but the score dedicated to Traumihler is stored in the archive of the St. Florian Abbey. Copies are also stored in the Kremsmünster Abbey and the Österreichische Nationalbibliothek. The motet was edited first by Johann Groß, Innsbruck in 1893. It is put in volume XXI/19 of the Gesamtausgabe.

== Music ==
The 52-bar long motet in F major is scored SATB choir and S and A soloists, organ and cello (continuo). It begins in Andante with a fugato. The fugato is ending on bar 8 with the by Haas so-called Marien-Kadenz (cadence on the word "Maria"), which Bruckner will recall in the first movement of the Study Symphony in F minor and in the Adagio of the later Symphony No. 3. On the next bar the alto soloist is singing "gratia plena" and on bar 13 the soprano soloist is going on with "benedicta tu". On bars 18-22 the score is slowing down to Adagio, during which the choir is singing three times "Jesus". Bruckner will repeat this three times "Jesus" in his next two settings of the Ave Maria. The second part of the motet is sung by the choir (bars 23-52). The score, which goes back to Andante, begins with "Sancta Maria", sung in canon and ends with the beginning motif.

== Selected discography ==
The first recording of Bruckner's Ave Maria (WAB 5) was by Hubert Gunther with the Rheinische Singgemeinschaft in c. 1976 (LP: Garnet G 40 107). Farnberger's recording with the St. Florianer Sängerknaben, which was recorded in the St. Florian Abbey, provides the listener with a whiff of authenticity.

A selection of the about 10 recordings:

- Martin Flämig, Dresdner Kreuzchor, Ave Maria – Anton Bruckner: Geistliche Chöre-Motets – CD: Capriccio 10 081, 1985
- Joseph Pancik, Prager Kammerchor, Anton Bruckner: Motetten / Choral-Messe – CD: Orfeo C 327 951 A, 1993
- Sigvards Klava, Latvian Radio Choir, Musica Sacra – CD: Campion Records RRCD 1341, 1996
- Franz Farnberger, St. Florianer Sängerknaben, Anton Bruckner in St. Florian – Requiem & Motetten CD: Studio SM D2639 SM 44, 1997
- Dan-Olof Stenlund, Malmö Kammarkör, Bruckner: Ausgewählte Werke - CD: Malmö Kammarkör MKKCD 051, 2004
- Petr Fiala, Czech Philharmonic Choir, Anton Bruckner: Motets - CD: MDG 322 1422-2, 2006
- Erwin Ortner, Arnold Schoenberg Chor, Anton Bruckner: Tantum ergo - CD: ASC Edition 3, issue of the choir, 2008

=== Note ===
The recordings are mostly performed without cello. The score of the soloists is sometimes sung by the mating voices of choir.

== Sources ==
- Max Auer, Anton Bruckner als Kirchenmusiker, G. Bosse, Regensburg, 1927
- Anton Bruckner - Sämtliche Werke, Band XXI: Kleine Kirchenmusikwerke, Musikwissenschaftlicher Verlag der Internationalen Bruckner-Gesellschaft, Hans Bauernfeind and Leopold Nowak (Editor), Vienna, 1984/2001
- Cornelis van Zwol, Anton Bruckner 1824-1896 - Leven en werken, uitg. Thoth, Bussum, Netherlands, 2012. ISBN 978-90-6868-590-9
