= Tantum ergo, WAB 32 =

1845 motet composed by Anton Bruckner

Tantum ergo
- Motet by Anton Bruckner
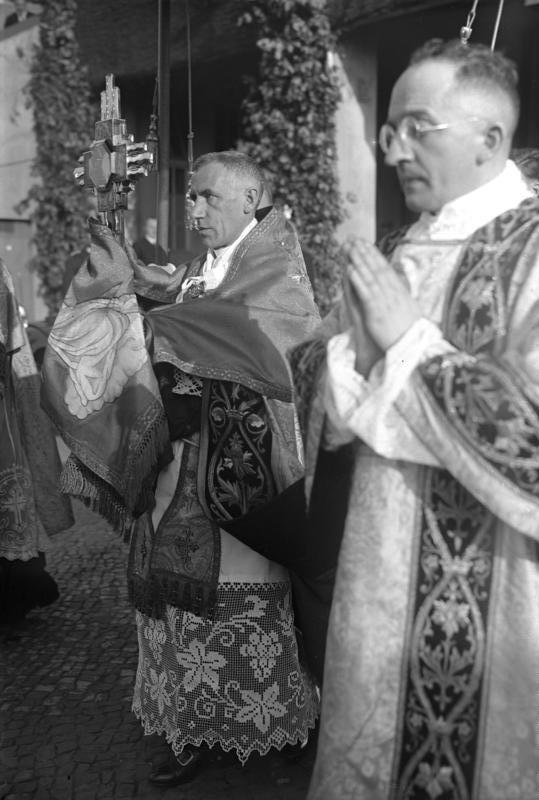
- Benediction of the Blessed Sacrament
- Key: D major
- Catalogue: WAB 32
- Form: Hymn
- Text: Tantum ergo
- Language: Latin
- Composed: 1845: Kronstorf
- Dedication: St. Florian Abbey
- Published: 1914: Vienna
- Vocal: SATB choir

Tantum ergo ("Let us raise"), WAB 32, is the first of eight settings of the hymn Tantum ergo composed by Anton Bruckner in 1845.

== History ==
Bruckner composed the motet in the fall of 1845 at the end of his stay in Kronstorf or at the beginning of his stay in St. Florian Abbey.

The original manuscript, which was dedicated to the St. Florian Abbey, is stored in the archive of the abbey. A copy made by Bruckner's student Oddo Loidol is stored in the archive of the Kremsmünster Monastery.

The motet was first published without the "facultative" bars as Pange lingua by Wöss, Universal Edition, together with the Vexilla regis in 1914 – the reason why Grasberger put is as WAB 32 after the Pange lingua, WAB 31. The full version is put in Band XXI/7 of the Gesamtausgabe.

== Music ==
The work of 38 bars (36 bars + a 2-bar Amen) in D major is scored for SATB choir a cappella. The bars 23 to 34, which Bruckner put as optional, were removed in the first edition.

This early Tantum ergo, which gives a feeling of angelic purity, is in Schubert's style. The fully conventional first part in D major is followed by a second part, which moves on via the mediant key of F-sharp minor and back to the coda in D major.

== Selected discography ==
The first recording of the Tantum ergo occurred in 1993:

- Joseph Pancik, Prager Kammerchor, Anton Bruckner: Motetten / Choral-Messe – CD: Orfeo C 327 951 A (first strophe of the shortened score)

There are about ten recordings, of which five with the full original setting:

- Jonathan Brown, Ealing Abbey Choir, Anton Bruckner: Sacred Motets – CD: Herald HAVPCD 213, 1997
- Erwin Ortner, Arnold Schoenberg Chor, Anton Bruckner: Tantum ergo - CD: ASC Edition 3, issue of the choir, 2008
- Sigvards Klava, Latvian Radio Choir, Bruckner: Latin Motets, 2019 – CD Ondine OD 1362
- Tristan Meister, Jugendchor Hochtaunus, Nightfall - Sacred Romantic Part Songs – CD Rondeau ROP6180, 2019
- Andrew Lucas, St Albans Cathedral Choir, Bruckner − Motets − CD: LC 18236, 2022

== Sources ==
- Max Auer, Anton Bruckner als Kirchenmusiker, G. Bosse, Regensburg, 1927
- Anton Bruckner – Sämtliche Werke, Band XXI: Kleine Kirchenmusikwerke, Musikwissenschaftlicher Verlag der Internationalen Bruckner-Gesellschaft, Hans Bauernfeind and Leopold Nowak (Editor), Vienna, 1984/2001
- Cornelis van Zwol, Anton Bruckner 1824–1896 – Leven en werken, uitg. Thoth, Bussum, Netherlands, 2012. ISBN 978-90-6868-590-9
