= Afferentur regi =

1861 motet composed by Anton Bruckner

- Motet by Anton Bruckner
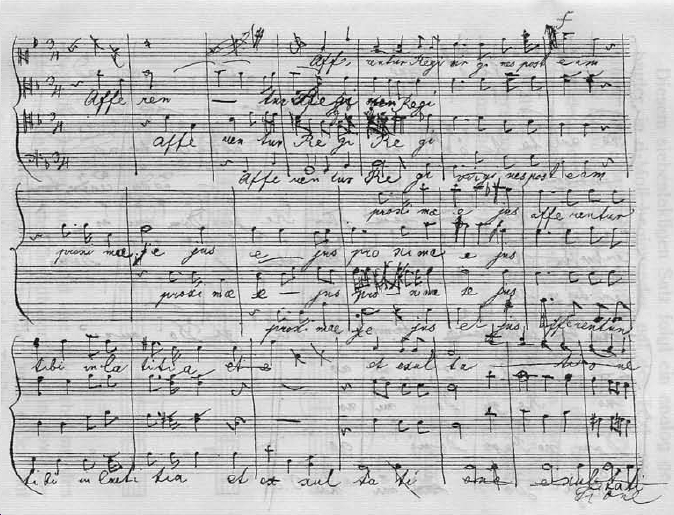
- Draft of Afferentur regi, page 1
- Key: F major
- Catalogue: WAB 1
- Form: Offertory
- Language: Latin
- Dedication: Johann Baptist Burgstaller (1885)
- Performed: 31 December 1861: St. Florian Abbey
- Published: 1922: Vienna
- Vocal: SATB choir
- Instrumental: 3 trombones ad lib.

Afferentur regi (Led to the king), WAB 1, is a motet, which Anton Bruckner composed on 7 November 1861 on the text of the Offertorium of the Missa pro Virgine et Martyre.

== History ==
Afferentur regi is the second of the two "great motets" during a "fruitful though brief" period of Bruckner's compositional career following Sechter's tuition, the other motet being the Ave Maria WAB 6. Afferentur regi was premiered in St. Florian Abbey on the feast day of Saint Lucy, 13 December 1861.

An early draft for choir alone was found in a monastic archive at Kremsmünster Abbey. The original manuscript is not extant, but several transcriptions were found in the archive of St. Florian Abbey. Many years later, in 1885, Bruckner dedicated the work as an Offertorium als Graduale (offertory as gradual) to Johann Baptist Burgstaller, choir director of the New Cathedral in Linz.

The work was edited in 1922 as an addendum to band 11–12 of Musica Divina, Vienna. It is put in Band XXI/21 of the Gesamtausgabe.

== Text ==
The text is derived from Psalms 45:15-16, which is Psalm 44 in the Vulgata.

Adducentur regi virgines post eam;
proximae ejus afferentur tibi.
Afferentur in laetitia et exsultatione;
adducentur in templum regis.

She is led to the king,
with the young women, her friends.
With joy and laughter shall they be brought to you!
a grand entrance to the king's palace!

== Setting ==
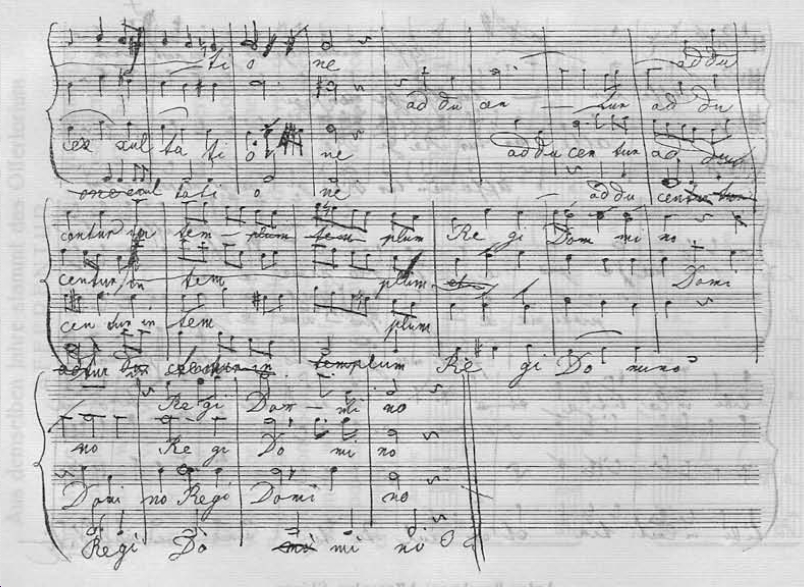
Draft of Afferentur regi, page 2

The 38-bars piece scored in F major for mixed choir and three trombones ad libitum is a polyphonic offertory. The piece is in ternary form, with an opening motive drawn from a pre-existing Latin plainchant. In the first part (bars 1–7), "Afferentur regi" is sung in canon by the alto and tenor voices, and with inverted motif by the bass and soprano voices. A similar pattern is repeated in bars 8–15 on "proximae ejus". The middle section (bars 15–24), which begins with "et exultatione" by the bass, similarly as "usque in aeternum" in bars 299-309 of Bruckner's later Te Deum, is stylistically similar to faux bourdon, a technique employed primarily in medieval and Renaissance music. It is followed by a general pause. The third part (bars 25–38) on "adducentur in templum" begins as the first part and ends on a pedal point on the tonic.

Keith W. Kinder suggests that its use of counterpoint may be a reflection of Bruckner's sense of liberation from the "prohibition on free composition" imposed by his former composition teacher, Simon Sechter. Dermot Gault notes that in this work Bruckner "wears his learning lightly" in the contrapuntal writing.

Bruckner quoted from the Afferentur regi in the movement Qui cum Patre et Filio, part of the Credo of the Mass in D minor.

== Selected discography ==
Bruckner's Afferentur regi was recorded at first in 1965 by Giulio Bertola with the Coro Polifonico Italiano a cappella (LP: Angelicum LPA 5989)

A selection of the about 30 recordings:

- Simon Halsey, City of Birmingham Symphony Wind Ensemble & Chorus, Bruckner: Mass in E minor & Motets – Conifer CDCF 192, 1990
- Hans-Christoph Rademann, NDR Chor Hamburg, Anton Bruckner: Ave Maria – Carus 83.151, 2000
- Dan-Olof Stenlund, Malmö Chamber Choir, Ausgewählte Werke. MKKCD 051, 2004
- Michael Stenov, Cantores Carmeli, Benefizkonzert Karmelitenkirche Linz – CD/DVD issued by the choir, 2006, and on YouTube.
- Duncan Ferguson, Choir of St. Mary's Cathedral of Edinburgh, Bruckner: Motets – CD: Delphian Records DCD34071, 2010
- Philipp Ahmann, MDR Rundfunkchor Leipzig, Anton Bruckner & Michael Haydn - Motets – SACD: Pentatone PTC 5186 868, 2021

== Sources ==
- Max Auer, Anton Bruckner als Kirchenmusiker, G. Bosse, Regensburg, 1927
- Anton Bruckner – Sämtliche Werke, Band XXI: Kleine Kirchenmusikwerke, Musikwissenschaftlicher Verlag der Internationalen Bruckner-Gesellschaft, Hans Bauernfeind and Leopold Nowak (Editor), Vienna, 1984/2001
- Cornelis van Zwol, Anton Bruckner 1824–1896 – Leven en werken, uitg. Thoth, Bussum, Netherlands, 2012. ISBN 978-90-6868-590-9
