= Tota pulchra es (Bruckner) =

Motet by Anton Bruckner

- Motet by Anton Bruckner
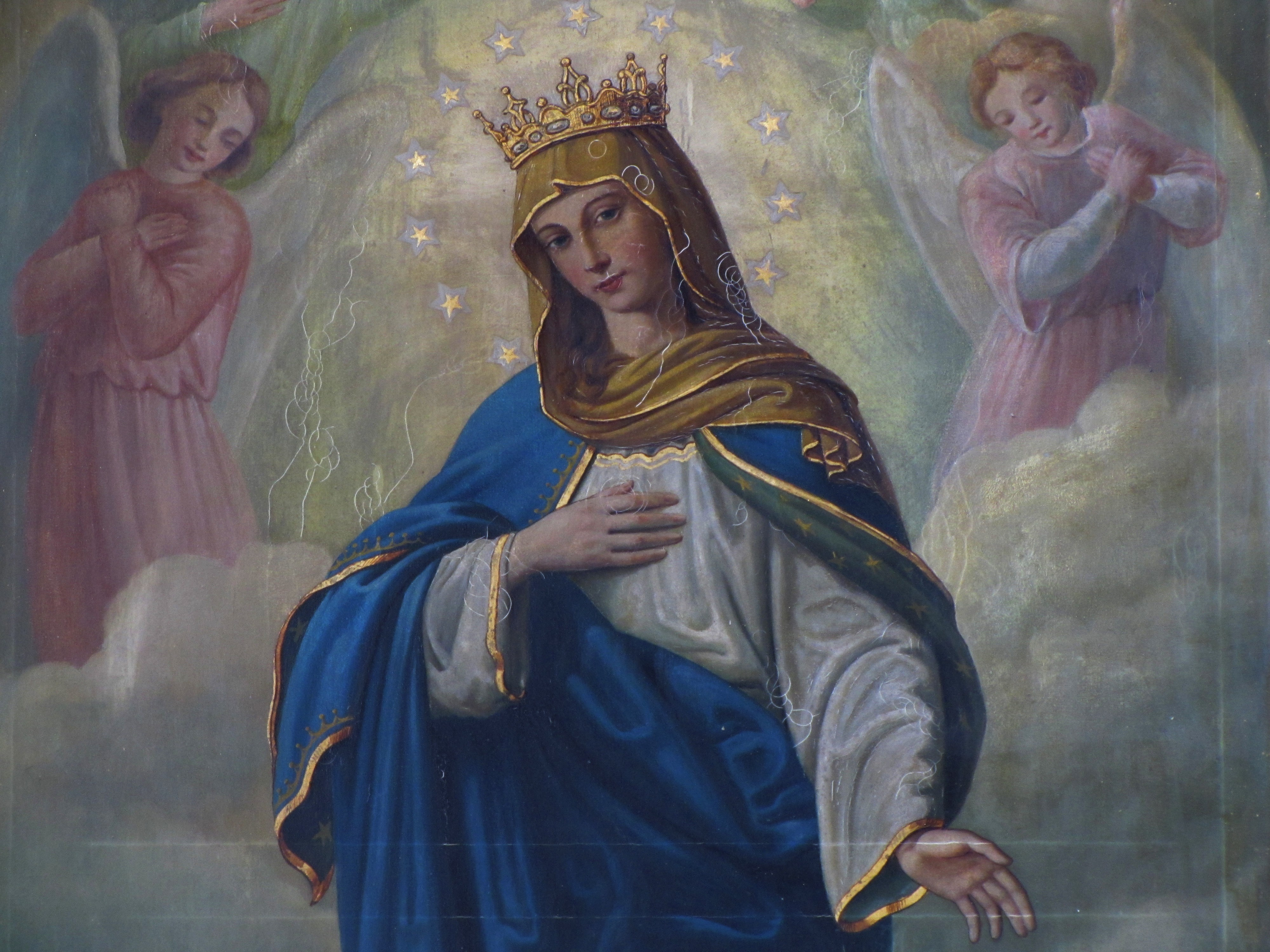
- Immaculate Conception (Dingsheim)
- Key: Phrygian mode
- Catalogue: WAB 46
- Form: Marian antiphon
- Text: Tota pulchra es
- Language: Latin
- Dedication: Franz-Josef Rudigier
- Performed: 4 June 1878: Linz
- Published: 1887: Vienna
- Vocal: SATB choir – Tenor soloist
- Instrumental: organ

Tota pulchra es, WAB 46, is a sacred motet by the Austrian composer Anton Bruckner.

== History ==
The work, which was composed on 30 March 1878 between symphonies 5 and 6, is scoring the Latin antiphon Tota pulchra es. It was performed on 4 June 1878 in the Votive Chapel of the new cathedral of the Immaculate Conception to commemorate the 25th anniversary of Franz-Josef Rudigier as bishop of Linz.

The manuscript is archived at the Österreichische Nationalbibliothek. The Widmungsexemplar (dedicated copy) is stored in the archive of the new cathedral. The motet was edited, together with the Ave Maria WAB 6, by Emil Wetzler, Vienna in 1887. It is put in Band XXI/27 of the Gesamtausgabe.

== Music ==
The 80-bars piece, scored for solo tenor, choir and organ, is primarily in the Phrygian mode, with some remote enharmonic modulation.

In the first part (bars 1-16) the soloist and the choir are dialoguing a cappella. In the second part (bars 17-36), which begins fortissimo by the soloist with the organ on "Tu gloria Jerusalem", the choir becomes divided till 9 voices. In the third part (bars 37-52), which begins on "O, Maria", the soloist and the choir are dialoguing a cappella as in the first part. In the last part, which begins as in the second part by the soloist with the organ on "Ora pro nobis", the choir goes on diminuendo till the end in pianissimo.

== Selected discography ==
Bruckner's Tota pulchra es was first recorded in 1929 by Ludwig Berberich with the Münchner Domchor, 1929 (78 rpm: Polydor/Grammophon 27119)

A selection of the about 40 recordings:

- Eugen Jochum, Bavarian Radio Symphony Orchestra & Choir, Bruckner: Symphony No.4, Motets – LP: DG 139134/5, 1966
- Hans Zanotelli, Philharmonia vocal-ensemble Stuttgart, Anton Brucknr, Lateinische Motetten – CD: Calig CAL 50 477, 1979
- Matthew Best, Corydon Singers, Bruckner: Motets - CD: Hyperion CDA66062, 1982
- Elmar Hausmann, Capella Vocale St. Aposteln Köln, Anton Bruckner, Missa solemnis in B, Motetten – LP: Aulos AUL 53 569, 1983
- Wolfgang Schäfer, Freiburg Vocal Ensemble, Anton Bruckner: Motetten – CD: Christophorus 74 501, 1984
- Herbert Böck, Concentus Vocalis Wien, Bruckner: Motetten; Distler: Totentanz – CD: Koch Schwann 317 008 H1, 1988
- Wolfgang Mayrhofer, Linzer Jeunesse Chor, Tota pulchra – CD: Ausgabe des Chores, 2005
- Michael Stenov, Cantores Carmeli, Benefizkonzert Karmelitenkirche Linz - CD/DVD issued by the choir, 2006, and on YouTube.
- Erwin Ortner, Arnold Schoenberg Chor, Anton Bruckner: Tantum ergo - CD: ASC Edition 3, issue of the choir, 2008

== Sources ==
- Max Auer, Anton Bruckner als Kirchenmusiker, G. Bosse, Regensburg, 1927
- Anton Bruckner - Sämtliche Werke, Band XXI: Kleine Kirchenmusikwerke, Musikwissenschaftlicher Verlag der Internationalen Bruckner-Gesellschaft, Hans Bauernfeind and Leopold Nowak (Editor), Vienna, 1984/2001
- Uwe Harten, Anton Bruckner. Ein Handbuch. Residenz Verlag, Salzburg, 1996. ISBN 3-7017-1030-9
