= Christus factus est, WAB 11 =

1884 motet composed by Anton Bruckner

Christus factus est
- Motet by Anton Bruckner
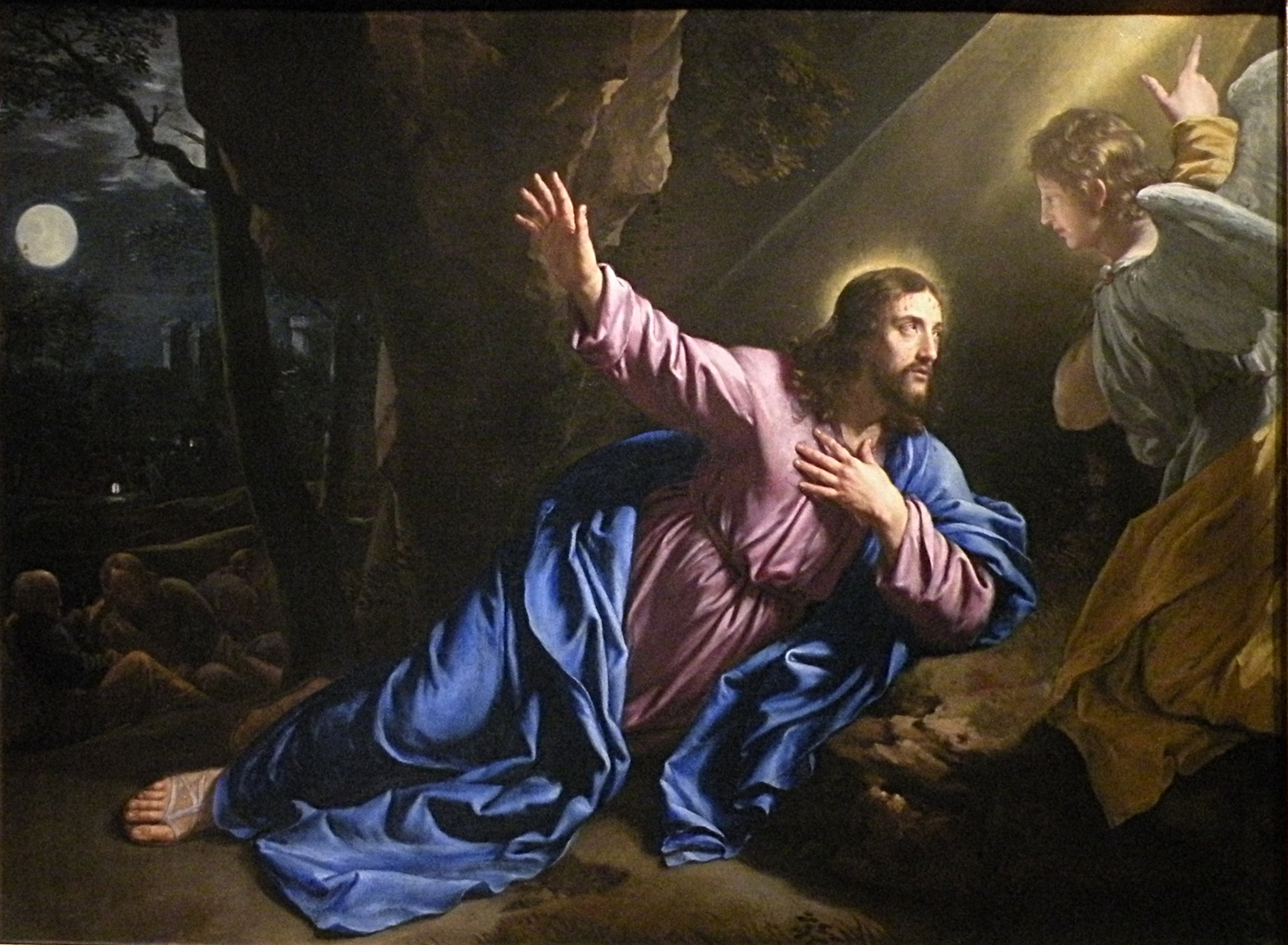
- Le Christ au jardin des oliviers, by Philippe de Champaigne
- Key: D minor
- Catalogue: WAB 11
- Form: Gradual
- Language: Latin
- Performed: 9 November 1884: Vienna
- Published: 1886: Vienna
- Scoring: SATB choir

Christus factus est ("Christ became obedient"), WAB 11, is a sacred motet by Anton Bruckner, his third setting of the Latin gradual Christus factus est, composed in 1884. Before, Bruckner composed in 1844 a first piece on the same text as gradual of the Messe für den Gründonnerstag (WAB 9), and in 1873 a motet (WAB 10) for eight-part mixed choir, three trombones, and string instruments ad libitum. The motet is an expressive setting of the gradual, influenced by Wagner's music.

== History ==
Bruckner composed this motet, which uses the gradual of Maundy Thursday, on 25 May 1884. The piece was performed six months later, on 9 November, in the Wiener Hofmusikkapelle. Bruckner dedicated the work to Oddo Loidol, one of his students.

The original manuscript is in a private collection (Dr Wilhelm, Bottmingen), but transcriptions of it are found in the archives of the Abbey of Kremsmünster and the Austrian National Library. The piece was published together with three other graduals (Locus iste, WAB 23, Os justi, WAB 30, and Virga Jesse, WAB 52) by Theodor Rättig, Vienna in 1886. The motet was published in volume XXI/30 of the Gesamtausgabe.

== Music ==
The work in 79 bars in D minor is set for mixed choir a cappella. It takes about five minutes to perform.

In the first part (bars 1–19), till "mortem autem crucis", the choir is singing in homophony. It expresses in sombre lines how inhuman is God's demand to implacable obedience to the death, even the death on the cross. After a one-bar rest (bar 20), the motet evolves in waves of intensification, with twice the Dresdner Amen, on "exaltavit illum" (bars 23–24) and "super omne nomen" (bars 37–38), respectively. After a second one-bar rest (bar 56) it reaches a dramatic climax (bars 57–62). Thereafter the motet is evolving diminuendo and a gradual sorrowful rest returns with the 8-bar coda in pianissimo, which is harmonically similar to that of the previous setting of 1873. Publisher Carus-Verlag summarizes that by means of modulation and chromatic, Bruckner achieves heightened expressiveness for the Passion text.

Bruckner composed the piece when he was in preparation to have his Symphony No. 7 performed and revised his Te Deum. The second part of the Grail motif from Wagner's Parsifal which the composer had heard in Bayreuth in 1882 is also the Dresdner Amen.

== Selected discography ==
The first recording of Bruckner's Christus factus est, WAB 11 occurred in 1928:

- Gustav Schauerte, Paderborner Domchor – 78 rpm: Polydor/Grammophon 27 137, 1928

A selection among the about 100 recordings:

- Eric Ericson, Swedish Radio Choir, Treasures – CD: Caprice Records CAP 21814, 1975
- Matthew Best, Corydon Singers, Bruckner: Motets – CD: Hyperion CDA66062, 1982
- Wolfgang Schäfer, Freiburger Vokalensemble, Anton Bruckner: Motetten – CD: Christophorus 74 501, 1984
- Philippe Herreweghe, Collegium Vocale Gent, Ensemble Musique Oblique, Bruckner: Messe en mi mineur; Motets – CD: Harmonia Mundi France HMC 901322, 1989
- Rolf Schweizer, Motettenchor Pforzheim, Bruckner: Messe e-Moll, Motetten – CD: Mediaphon 72 137, 1992
- Jonathan Brown, Ealing Abbey Choir, Anton Bruckner: Sacred Motets – CD: Herald HAVPCD 213, 1997
- Hans-Christoph Rademann, NDR Chor Hamburg, Anton Bruckner: Ave Maria – Carus 83.151, 2000
- Stephen Layton, Polyphony Choir, Bruckner: Mass in E minor & Motets – CD: Hyperion CDA 67629, 2007
- Erwin Ortner, Arnold Schoenberg Chor, Anton Bruckner: Tantum ergo – CD: ASC Edition 3, issue of the choir, 2008
- Otto Kargl, Domkantorei St. Pölten, Cappela Nova Graz, Bruckner: Messe e-Moll, CD: ORF CD 3174, 2013
- Philipp Ahmann, MDR Rundfunkchor Leipzig, Anton Bruckner & Michael Haydn - Motets – SACD: Pentatone PTC 5186 868, 2021

== Sources ==
- Max Auer, Anton Bruckner als Kirchenmusiker, G. Bosse, Regensburg, 1927
- Anton Bruckner – Sämtliche Werke, Band XXI: Kleine Kirchenmusikwerke, Musikwissenschaftlicher Verlag der Internationalen Bruckner-Gesellschaft, Hans Bauernfeind and Leopold Nowak (Editor), Vienna, 1984/2001
- Cornelis van Zwol, Anton Bruckner 1824–1896 – Leven en werken, uitg. Thoth, Bussum, Netherlands, 2012. ISBN 978-90-6868-590-9
- Uwe Harten, Anton Bruckner. Ein Handbuch. Residenz Verlag, Salzburg, 1996. ISBN 3-7017-1030-9
