= List of motets by Anton Bruckner =

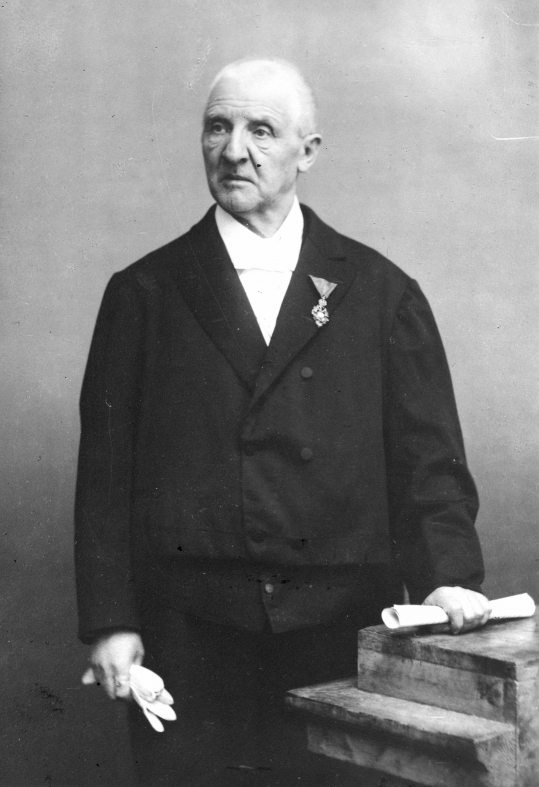
Anton Bruckner with the Order of Franz Joseph, 1886

Anton Bruckner composed about 40 motets during his life, the earliest, a setting of Pange lingua, in c. 1835, the last, Vexilla regis in 1892.

== Youth works ==
Before 1841 only a single work, a motet, has indubitably been composed by Bruckner.

- Pange lingua in C major (WAB 31):
  - First version : a setting of 28 bars of the Pange lingua for choir a cappella, which Bruckner composed in 1835/1836 when, as eleven-year-old boy, he was studying by Johann Baptist Weiß in Hörsching.
  - Second version: towards the end of his life (19 April 1891) Bruckner "restored" this beloved very first composition.

The few other works of this period in Grasberger's catalogue are either obviously not by Bruckner or of doubtful authenticity. Domine, ad adjuvandum me festina ("O Lord, make haste to help me"; WAB 136) is a composition of Johann Baptist Weiß. The five preludes in E♭ major for organ (WAB 127 and 128) and a few other organ works found in Bruckner's Orgelbuch are presumably transcriptions of works of Johann Baptist Weiß or other composers.

== Windhaag and Kronstorf ==
During his stay as schoolteacher's assistant in Windhaag (3 October 1841 - 23 January 1843) and Kronstorf (23 January 1843 - 23 September 1845), Bruckner composed the three early masses Windhaager Messe, Kronstorfer Messe, and Messe für den Gründonnerstag. During his stay in Kronstorf he composed also his first name-day cantata Vergißmeinnicht and a few motets:

- Libera me (WAB 21): a first setting in F major of the Libera me for choir and organ, which Bruckner composed in c. 1843.
- Litanei (WAB 132): this litany, a lost work for mixed choir and brass instruments, was presumably composed around 1844.
- Salve Maria (WAB 134): this Marian hymn, possibly a Salve Regina, another lost work, was presumably also composed around 1844.
- Asperges me (WAB 4): this first setting of 32 bars in F major of the Asperges me for choir a cappella was composed in 1843 or 1844.
- Two Asperges me (WAB 3): these two settings of the Asperges me for choir and organ were composed in 1844 or 1845.
  - Asperges me (WAB 3.1): this work in Aeolian mode was composed for the Asperges of Septuagesima Sunday till the 4th Sunday of Lent
  - Asperges me (WAB 3.2): this work in F major was composed for the Asperges of Passion Sunday
- Tantum ergo (WAB 32): this first setting of 36 bars in D major of the Tantum ergo for choir a cappella was composed during the fall 1845.
- Tantum ergo (WAB 43): this second setting of 36 bars in A major of the Tantum ergo for choir and organ was composed during the fall of 1845 (or perhaps in 1846 in Sankt Florian?)
- Dir, Herr, dir will ich mich ergeben ("To You, Lord, to You I will surrender myself"; WAB 12): the date of composition of this chorale motet in A major for choir a cappella is uncertain: 1844-1845 (Kronstorf) or 1845-1846 (Sankt Florian).

== Sankt Florian ==
Between 23 September 1845 and 24 December 1855, during his stay as organist in Sankt Florian monastery, Bruckner composed the Magnificat, the Requiem, the Missa solemnis, Psalms 22 and 114, and four name-day cantatas Entsagen, the Arneth Cantata, the Mayer Cantata, and the Festgesang, as well as the following motets:

- O Du liebes Jesu-Kind ("O, You dear Child Jesus"; WAB 145): this motet of 16 bars in F major for soloist and organ, is of uncertain authorship. If actually by Bruckner, presumably composed in 1845/1846.
- Herz Jesu-Lied ("Song of the Heart of Jesus"; WAB 144): this motet of 24 bars in B♭ major for choir and organ, is also of uncertain authorship. If actually by Bruckner, presumably composed in 1845/1846.
- Four Tantum ergo (WAB 41):
  - First version: these four Tantum ergo of 24 bars (No. 1: 25 bars) plus a 2- or 3-bar Amen: B♭ major, A♭ major, E♭ major and C major, for choir and organ ad libitum were composed in 1846.
  - Second version: in 1888 Bruckner made a slight revision of the four Tantum ergo, which he then scored for choir a cappella.
- Tantum ergo D-Dur (WAB 42)
  - First version: this fifth Tantum ergo of 36 bars in D major for 5-voice choir (SSATB) and organ was composed on 9 June 1846.
  - Second version: in 1888 Bruckner made also a revision of it. The composition was shortened (8 bars removed) and a 3-bar Amen was added.
- In jener letzten der Nächte ("In this last night"; WAB 17): a Passion chorale for Maundy Thursday of 22 bars in F minor, composed in c. 1848. Two settings:
  - First setting: for soloist and organ,
  - Second setting: for choir a cappella.
- Two Totenlieder: these two elegies for choir a cappella were composed in 1852 for the funeral of Josef Seiberl
  - Totenlied (WAB 47): 10 bars, E♭ major
  - Totenlied (WAB 48): 19 bars, F major
- Libera me (WAB 22): this Libera me of 94 bars in F minor for 5-voice choir (SSATB), organ, 3 trombones and figured bass (organ, cello and contrabass) was composed on 28 March 1854 as absoute for the funeral of prelate Michael Arneth
- Tantum ergo B-Dur (WAB 44): this eighth setting of 29 bars in B♭ major of the Tantum ergo for choir, 2 trumpets, 2 violins and organ was composed in c. 1854.

=== Related works ===
- In addition Bruckner composed two Aequali (WAB 114 & 149) in C minor for 3 trombones in January 1847 for the funeral of his aunt Rosalia Mayrhofer.
- For Arneth's funeral Bruckner composed also Vor Arneths Grab ("Facing Arneth's tomb"; WAB 53), a 28-bar elegy in F minor for men's choir (TTBB) and 3 trombones.

== Linz ==
Between 24 December 1855 and 1 October 1868 Bruckner staid in Linz. During Sechter's tuition (from mid 1855 till 26 March 1861) Bruckner finalised the Psalm 146, which he had drafted during his stay in Sankt Florian, and composed only a few small works, of which a single motet:

- Ave Maria (WAB 5): a 52-bar work, the first of three Ave Maria in F major for choir, soprano and alto soloists, organ and cello was composed on 24 July 1856 as present to Ignaz Traumihler, the choirmaster of Sankt Florian.

After the end of Sechter's tuition Bruckner composed two motets:

- Ave Maria (WAB 6): a 51-bar work, the second of three Ave Maria in F major for 7-voice choir a cappella, which Bruckner composed in May 1861 to celebrate the end of Sechter's tuition.
- Afferentur regi (WAB 1): a 38-bar offertorium in F major for choir and 3 trombones ad libitum composed on 7 November 1861.

Until 10 July 1863 Bruckner studied further by Otto Kitzler. During this period he composed the String Quartet in C minor, his first orchestral compositions (the Four Orchestral Pieces, the Overture in G minor and the Study Symphony in F minor) and a few other compositions as the Festive Cantata Preiset den Herrn, the Psalm 112 and Germanenzug. After the end of Kitzler's tuition, Bruckner composed successively the masses Nos. 1, 2 and 3 and his first symphony.

After the end of Kitzler's tuition Bruckner composed also a few motets:

- Pange lingua (WAB 33): a 38-bar Pange lingua and Tantum ergo in Phrygian mode composed on 31 January 1868.
- Inveni David ("I have found David"; WAB 19): a 46-bar offertorium in F minor for men's choir and 4 trombones composed on 21 April 1868.
- Iam lucis orto sidere ("Now that the daylight fills the sky"; WAB 18)
  - First version: a 24-bar motet in E minor (Phrygian mode), which Bruckner composed in mid 1868. Two settings:
    - First setting: for choir a cappella,
    - Second setting: for choir and organ.
  - Second version: slightly revised (23 bars) in G minor for men's choir, 1886.

=== Related work ===
Am Grabe, WAB 2, a revised a cappella version of Vor Arneths Grab, has been composed around the end of Sechter's tuition to be performed on the funeral of Josephine Hafferl.

== Vienna ==
Between 1 October 1868 and 11 October 1896, during the "Vienna period" Bruckner devoted the most his time to his symphonies, with, between Symphonies No. 5 and 6, the String Quintet in F major, between Symphonies No. 6 and 7, the Te Deum, and, between Symphonies No. 8 and 9, Psalm 150 and the secular cantata Helgoland. In between Bruckner composed also the following motets:

- Locus iste (WAB 23): a 48-bar gradual in C major for choir a cappella composed on 11 August 1869 for the dedication of the votive chapel at the New Cathedral in Linz.
- Christus factus est ("Christus became obedient"; WAB 10): a 61-bar work, the second of three graduals Christus factus est in D minor for 8-voice choir, 3 trombones and string instruments ad libitum, composed in 1873. Note: The first Christus factus est is the gradual of the Messe für den Gründonnerstag.
- Tota pulchra es (WAB 46): an 80-bar antiphon in Phrygian mode for tenor soloist, choir and organ, composed on 30 March 1878.
- Os justi ("The mouth of the righteous utters wisdom"; WAB 30): a 71-bar gradual with final unison Alleluja in Lydian mode for choir a cappella composed on 18 July 1879. As requested by Ignaz Traumihler, Bruckner added to it on 28 July 1879 an unison Versus-Choral Inveni David with organ (WAB 20).
- Ave Maria (WAB 7): an 81-bar work, the third of three Ave Maria in F major for alto soloist and organ (harmonium or piano), which Bruckner composed 5 February 1882 for alto soloist Luisa Hochleitner.
- Christus factus est (WAB 11): a 79-bar work, the third of three graduals Christus factus est in D minor, composed on 25 May 1884.
- Salvum fac populum tuum ("O Lord, save thy people"; WAB 40): a 57-bar motet in F major, based on a few verses of the Te Deum, for choir a cappella composed on 14 November 1884.
- Veni Creator Spiritus (WAB 50): harmonisation of the Gregorian Veni Creator Spiritus for unison voices with organ, composed in c. 1884.
- Ecce sacerdos magnus (WAB 13): a 106-bar responsorium in A minor for choir, 3 trombones and organ, composed on 28 April 1885 for the 100th anniversary of the founding of the diocese of Linz.
- Virga Jesse (WAB 52): a 91-bar gradual in E minor for choir a cappella composed on 3 September 1885.
- Ave Regina caelorum (WAB 8): harmonisation of the Gregorian Ave Regina caelorum for unison voices with organ, composed in c. 1886.
- Vexilla regis (WAB 51): a 36-bar motet in Phrygian mode for choir a cappella composed for Good Friday on 9 February 1892.

=== Related works ===
- Franz Joseph Aumann's music was a large part of the repertoire at St. Florian in the 19th century. Bruckner, who liked Aumann's coloured harmony, added in 1879 an accompaniment by three trombones to his settings of Ecce quomodo moritur justus and Tenebrae factae sunt.

== Discography ==
Some motets, as Locus iste and three other graduals, and the Ave Maria WAB 6, are very popular and are often put on LPs / CDs together with religious works of several composers, or as extras of a larger religious work (Mass No. 2). Frieder Bernius, Matthew Best, Uwe Gronostay, Simon Halsey, Philippe Herreweghe and Stephen Layton have recorded each 5 to 10 of the most popular motets, sometimes with the two Aequali.

Other conductors have devoted LPs / CDs more specifically to Bruckner's motets, sometimes with the two Aequali, the early masses or other "forgotten" works, as the Missa solemnis, the Magnificat, the earlier Psalms 22, 114 and 112: Eugen Jochum (1966), Hubert Günther (c. 1976), Hans Zanotelli (1979), Johannes Fuchs (1984), Martin Flämig (1985), Robert Jones (1994), Rupert Gottfried Frieberger (1995 and 2007), Jonathan Brown (1997), Petr Fiala (2006), Erwin Ortner (2008), Thomas Kerbl (2009 and 2011), Duncan Ferguson (2010), Philipp von Steinäcker (2014) and the Bruckner - Bicentennial Houston CD (2025), with the Symphonisches Präludium, the premiere of an organ transcription of Helgoland, the Two Aequali and twelve motets – CD BSA-007.

There is as yet no commercial album with all the motets. A compilation in the chronological order of Band XXI of the Gesamtausgabe has been issued by Hans Roelofs: CD set DutchDragon HR 815-817.

== Sources ==
- Anton Bruckner - Sämtliche Werke, Band XXI: Kleine Kirchenmusikwerke (1835-1892), Musikwissenschaftlicher Verlag der Internationalen Bruckner-Gesellschaft, Hans Bauernfeind and Leopold Nowak (Editor), Vienna, 1984/2001
- Uwe Harten, Anton Bruckner. Ein Handbuch. Residenz Verlag, Salzburg, 1996. ISBN 3-7017-1030-9.
- Cornelis van Zwol, Anton Bruckner 1824-1896 - Leven en werken, uitg. Thoth, Bussum, Netherlands, 2012. ISBN 978-90-6868-590-9
