= Herz Jesu-Lied =

- Motet by Anton Bruckner
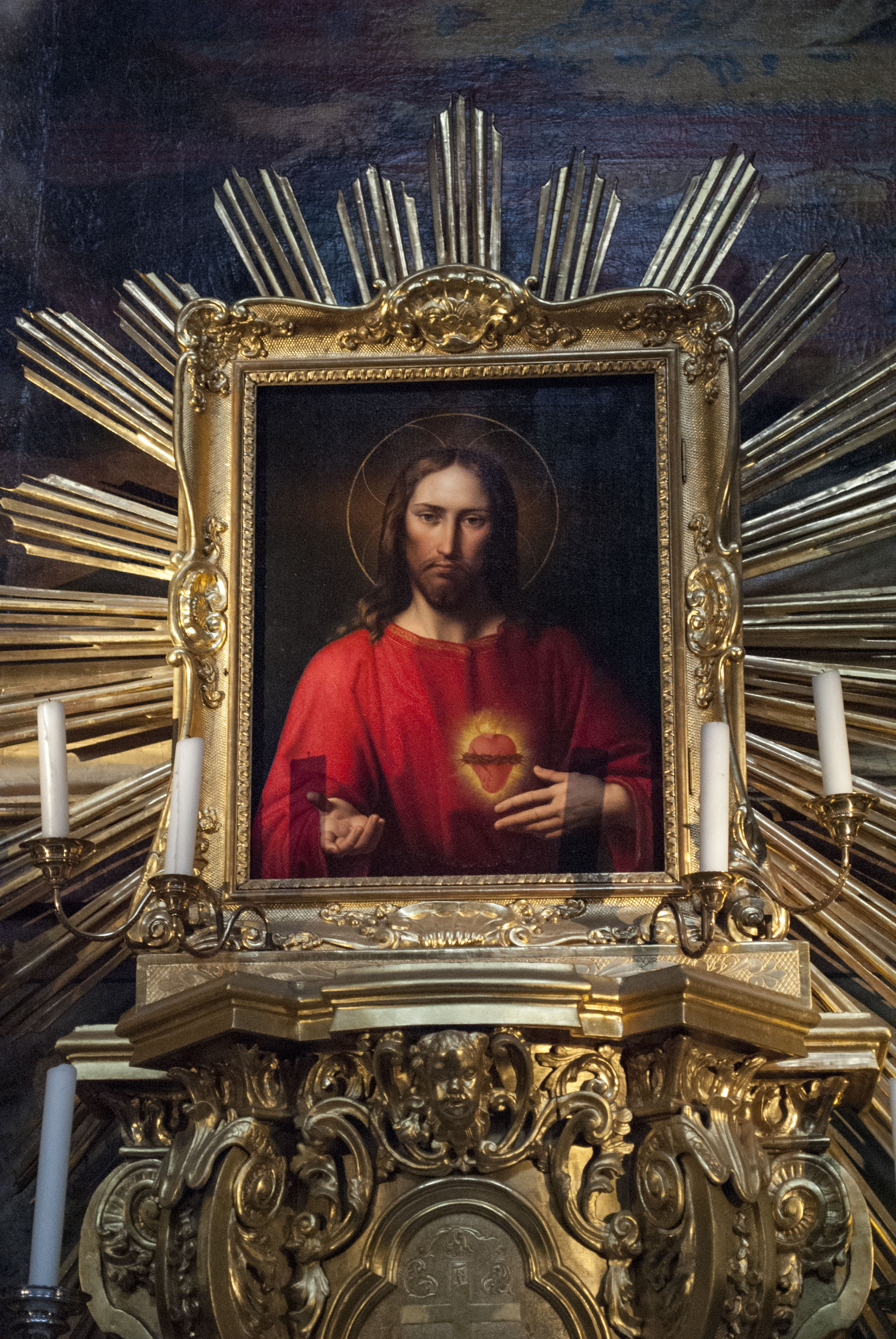
- Sacred Heart, Peterskirche, Vienna
- Key: B♭ major
- Catalogue: WAB 144
- Language: German
- Composed: c. 1846: St. Florian
- Published: 1932: Regensburg
- Vocal: SATB choir
- Instrumental: Organ

Herz Jesu-Lied ("Song of the Heart of Jesus"), WAB 144, is the second of two motets of Anton Bruckner's St. Florian period, which is of uncertain authorship. If Bruckner was the composer, it was composed presumably in 1845-1846.

== History ==
If Bruckner was the composer, he composed the motet in 1845–46 during his stay in St. Florian Abbey. The text is a hymn to the Sacred Heart.

The motet was first published in band II/2, pp. 11–12 of the Göllerich/Auer biography. The work is put in Band XXI/11 of the Gesamtausgabe.

== Text ==
Aus allen Herzen Eines,
stillt aller Herzen Leid,
aus allen Herzen Eines
ist aller Herzen Freud.
Das Herz im Sakramente,
dies Herz in Fleisch und Blut,
dies Gottes Herz, ach kennte
die Welt dies höchste Gut!

Of all hearts One
Stills the pain of all hearts,
Of all hearts One
Is the delight of all hearts.
The Heart in the Sacrament,
This Heart of Flesh and Blood,
This God's Heart, oh, knew
the world this highest good!

== Music ==
The work of 24-bar in B♭ major, which is scored for mixed choir and organ, contains two short passages for tenor and bass soloists, and soprano soloist, respectively, and ends with an organ postlude.

== Discography ==
There are only 2 recordings:

- Dan-Olof Stenlund, Malmö Kammarkör, Bruckner: Ausgewählte Werke – CD: Malmö Kammarkör MKKCD 051, 2004
- Thomas Kerbl, Chorvereinigung Bruckner 2011, Anton Bruckner: Lieder / Magnificat – CD: LIVA 046, 2011

== Sources ==
- August Göllerich, Anton Bruckner. Ein Lebens- und Schaffens-Bild, c. 1922 – posthumous edited by Max Auer by G. Bosse, Regensburg, 1932
- Anton Bruckner – Sämtliche Werke, Band XXI: Kleine Kirchenmusikwerke, Musikwissenschaftlicher Verlag der Internationalen Bruckner-Gesellschaft, Hans Bauernfeind and Leopold Nowak (Editor), Vienna, 1984/2001
- Cornelis van Zwol, Anton Bruckner 1824–1896 – Leven en werken, uitg. Thoth, Bussum, Netherlands, 2012. ISBN 978-90-6868-590-9
