= Stenlund =

Stenlund is a surname, originating from Västerbotten in Sweden. Notable people with the surname include:

- Dan-Olof Stenlund (born 1937), Swedish university professor and choir conductor
- Kevin Stenlund (born 1996), Swedish professional ice hockey forward
- Linda Stenlund, Swedish curler
- Ulf Stenlund (born 1967), former tennis player from Sweden
- Vern Stenlund (born 1956), professional hockey player, university professor, author and coach
