= Inveni David, WAB 19 =

Musical composition

Inveni David
- Motet by Anton Bruckner
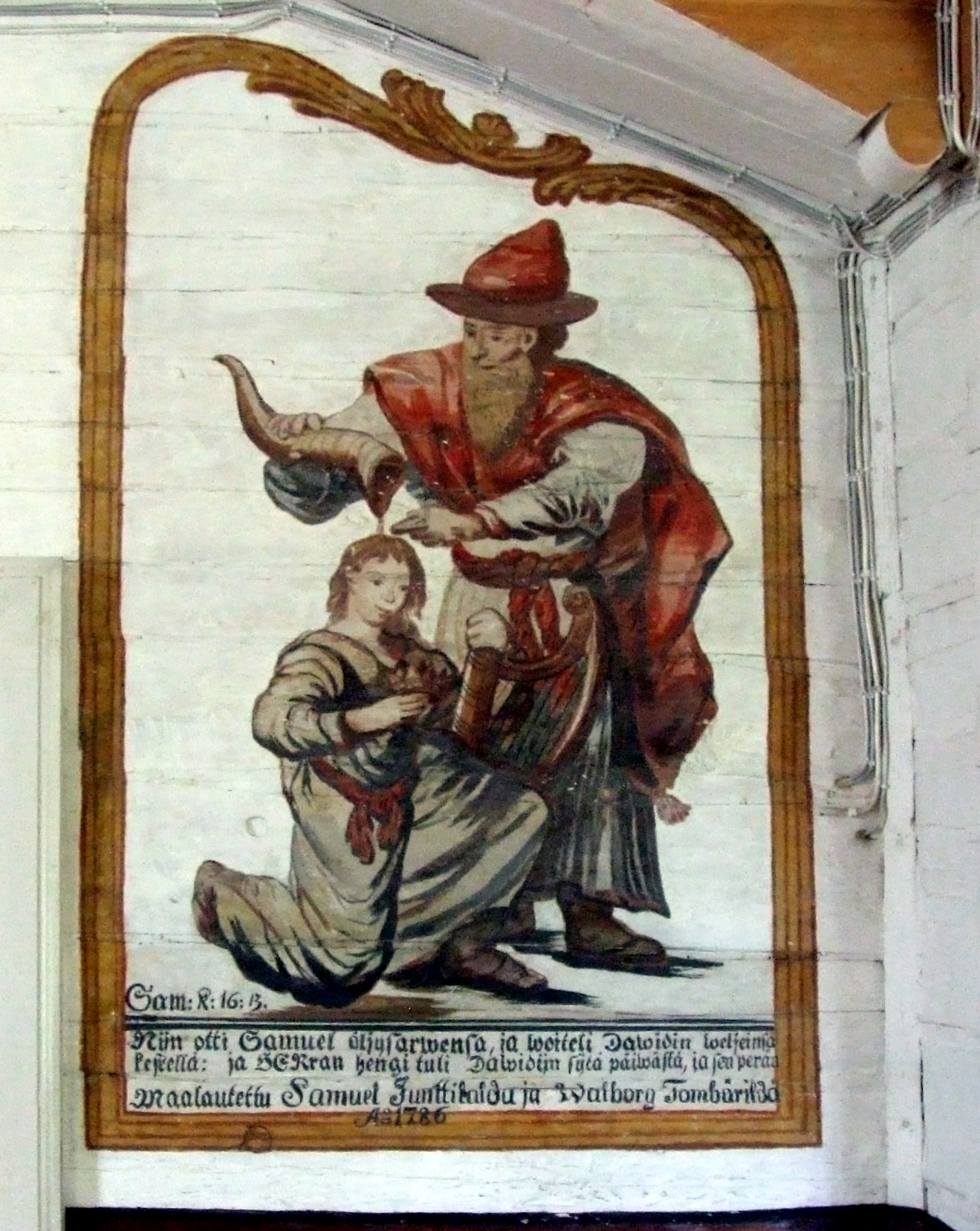
- Anointment of David, Old Church of Kempele
- Key: F minor
- Catalogue: WAB 19
- Form: Offertory
- Text: Psalms 89:20-21
- Language: Latin
- Composed: 21 April 1868: Linz
- Dedication: Liedertafel Frohsinn
- Published: 1932: Regensburg
- Vocal: TTBB choir
- Instrumental: 4 trombones

Inveni David (I have found David), WAB 19, is a sacred motet composed by Anton Bruckner in 1868.

== History ==
Bruckner composed the motet on 21 April 1868 at the end of his stay in Linz. He wrote it for the 24th anniversary of the Liedertafel Frohsinn. The first performance occurred on 10 May 1868 as offertory of a mass of Antonio Lotti.

The manuscript is archived at the Linzer Singakademie (Frohsinn-archive). The motet was first published in band III/2, pp. 239–244 of the Göllerich/Auer biography. It is put in Band XXI/23 of the Gesamtausgabe.

== Music ==
The text is taken from Psalm 89 (Psalms 89:20-21).

Inveni David servum meum,
oleo sancto meo unxi eum.
Manus enim mea auxiliabitur ei
et brachium meum confortabit eum.
Alleluja.

I have found David, my servant;
I have anointed him with my holy oil.
For my hand shall aid him
and my arm shall strengthen him.
Alleluia.

The work is a setting of 46 bars in F minor for TTBB choir and 4 trombones.

The last 16 bars consist of an Alleluja, for which Bruckner drew his inspiration from the Hallelujah of Händel's Messiah, on which he often improvised on the organ.

== Discography ==
The first recording occurred in 1959:

- Martin Koekelkoren, Mastreechter Staar, Royal Male Choir Mastreechter Staar – 45 rpm: Philips 402 155 NE

Other recordings:

- Joachim Martini, Junge Kantorei, Geistliche Chormusik der Romantik – LP: Schwarzwald MPS 13004, 1970
- Martin Flämig, Dresdner Kreuzchor, Ave Maria – Anton Bruckner: Geistliche Chöre-Motets – CD: Capriccio 10 081, 1985
- Hans-Christoph Rademann, NDR Chor Hamburg, Anton Bruckner: Ave Maria – CD: Carus 83.151, 2000
- Dan-Olof Stenlund, Malmö Kammarkör, Bruckner: Ausgewählte Werke - CD: Malmö Kammarkör MKKCD 051, 2004
- Michael Stenov, Cantores Carmeli, Benefizkonzert Karmelitenkirche Linz - CD/DVD issued by the choir, 2006.
- Thomas Kerbl, Männerchorvereinigung Bruckner 08, Anton Bruckner, Männerchöre – CD: LIVA027, 2008
- Philipp Ahmann, MDR Rundfunkchor Leipzig, Anton Bruckner & Michael Haydn - Motets – SACD: Pentatone PTC 5186 868, 2021

== Sources ==
- August Göllerich, Anton Bruckner. Ein Lebens- und Schaffens-Bild, c. 1922 – posthumous edited by Max Auer by G. Bosse, Regensburg, 1932
- Anton Bruckner – Sämtliche Werke, Band XXI: Kleine Kirchenmusikwerke, Musikwissenschaftlicher Verlag der Internationalen Bruckner-Gesellschaft, Hans Bauernfeind and Leopold Nowak (Editor), Vienna, 1984/2001
- Cornelis van Zwol, Anton Bruckner 1824–1896 – Leven en werken, uitg. Thoth, Bussum, Netherlands, 2012. ISBN 978-90-6868-590-9
- Crawford Howie, Anton Bruckner - A documentary biography, online revised edition
- Uwe Harten, Anton Bruckner. Ein Handbuch. Residenz Verlag, Salzburg, 1996. ISBN 3-7017-1030-9
