= Veni Creator Spiritus, WAB 50 =

1884 motet composed by Anton Bruckner

Veni Creator Spiritus
- Motet by Anton Bruckner
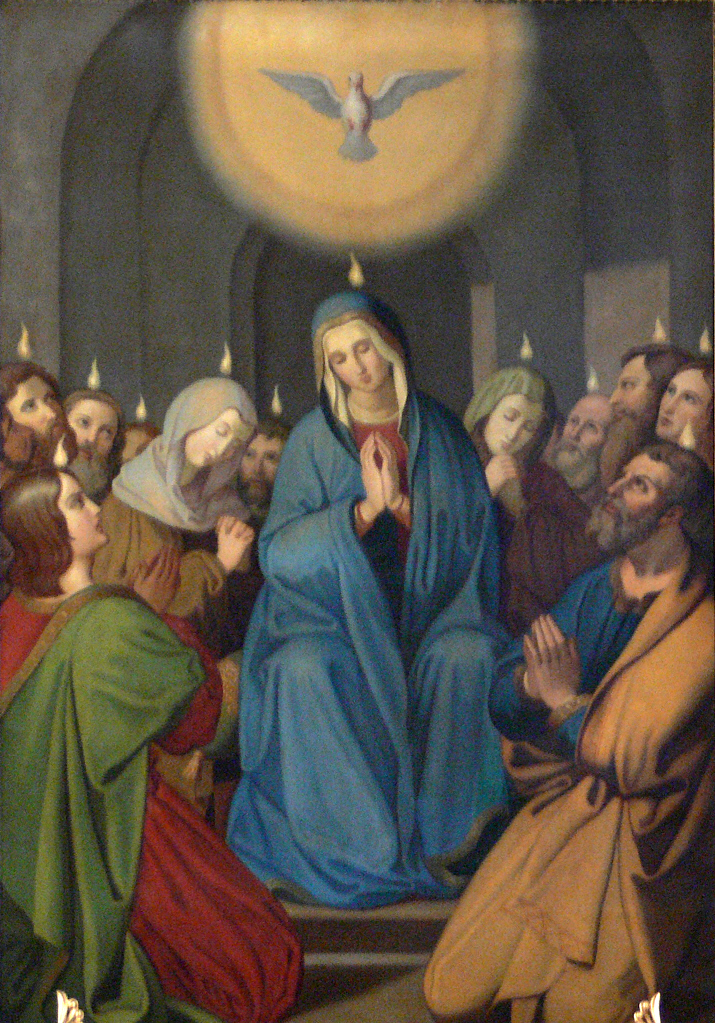
- Pfingstwunder by Fidelis Schabet
- Key: Gregorian mode
- Catalogue: WAB 50
- Form: Hymn
- Text: Veni Creator Spiritus
- Language: Latin
- Composed: c. 1884: Vienna
- Published: 1932: Regensburg
- Vocal: Voice(s)
- Instrumental: Organ

Veni Creator Spiritus ("Come, Holy Ghost, Creator blest"), WAB 50, is a motet composed by Anton Bruckner in c. 1884.

== History ==
The motet was composed in c. 1884. Bruckner's manuscript is stored in the Schlägl Abbey, where it was retrieved in 1931. The motet was first published in band IV/1, p. 524 of the Göllerich/Auer biography. It is put in Band XXI/36 of the Gesamtausgabe.

== Music ==
The motet is a harmonisation of the Gregorian hymn Veni Creator Spiritus for voice(s) and organ.

== Discography ==
There is a single recording of Bruckner's Veni Creator Spiritus:

- Jonathan Brown, Ealing Abbey Choir, Anton Bruckner: Sacred Motets – CD: Herald HAVPCD 213, 1997 (transcription for male voice choir a cappella)

== Sources ==
- August Göllerich, Anton Bruckner. Ein Lebens- und Schaffens-Bild, c. 1922 – posthumous edited by Max Auer by G. Bosse, Regensburg, 1932
- Anton Bruckner – Sämtliche Werke, Band XXI: Kleine Kirchenmusikwerke, Musikwissenschaftlicher Verlag der Internationalen Bruckner-Gesellschaft, Hans Bauernfeind and Leopold Nowak (Editor), Vienna, 1984/2001
- Cornelis van Zwol, Anton Bruckner 1824–1896 – Leven en werken, uitg. Thoth, Bussum, Netherlands, 2012. ISBN 978-90-6868-590-9
