= Tantum ergo, WAB 44 =

1854 motet composed by Anton Bruckner

Tantum ergo
- Motet by Anton Bruckner
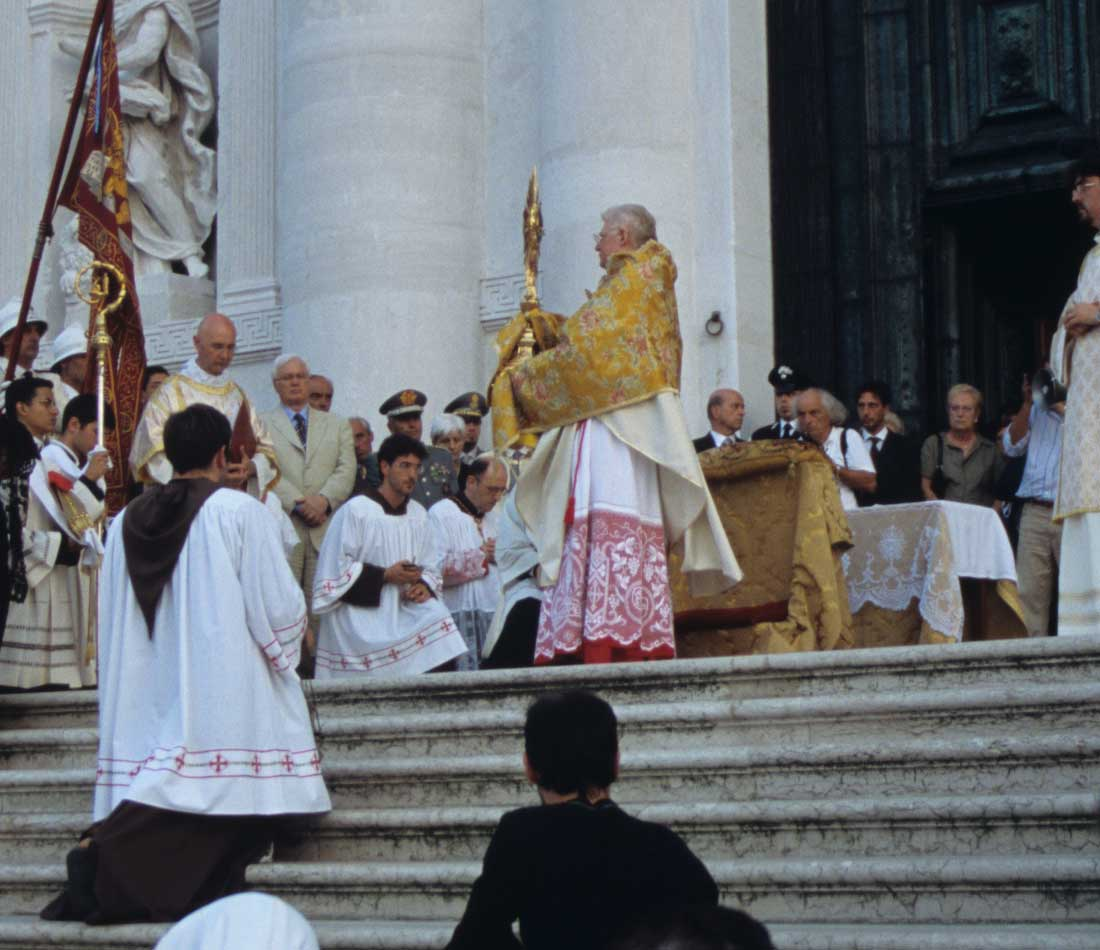
- Benediction of the Blessed Sacrament
- Key: B♭ major
- Catalogue: WAB 44
- Form: Hymn
- Text: Tantum ergo
- Language: Latin
- Composed: c. 1854: St. Florian
- Published: 1932: Regensburg
- Vocal: SATB choir
- Instrumental: 2 violins, 2 trumpets, organ

Tantum ergo ("Let us raise"), WAB 44, is the last of eight settings of the hymn Tantum ergo composed by Anton Bruckner in c. 1854.

== History ==
Bruckner composed the motet in c. 1854 during his stay in St. Florian Abbey. The original manuscript is lost. An autograph voice score is stored in the archive of the abbey.

The motet was first published in band II/2, pp. 256–258 of the Göllerich/Auer biography. It is put in Band XXI/18 of the Gesamtausgabe.

== Music ==
The work of 29 bars in B♭ major, as edited in the current Gesamtausgabe, is scored for SATB choir, 2 violins, 2 trumpets and organ.

On 25 June 2017 a new edition of the score by Cohrs, prepared for the Anton Bruckner Urtext Gesamtausgabe, with "reconstructed parts " of viola, cello and contrabass, and adding of timpani has been premiered by Łukasz Borowicz with the RIAS Kammerchor and the Akademie für Alte Musik Berlin.

== Discography ==
There are only three recordings of this last setting of Tantum ergo:

- Richard Proulx, Cathedral Singers and Chamber Orchestra, Rediscoverd Masterpieces – CD: GIA 515, 1998
- Thomas Kerbl, Chorvereinigung Bruckner 09, Anton Bruckner Chöre/Klaviermusik – CD: LIVA 034, 2009
- Łukasz Borowicz, RIAS Kammerchor, Akademie für Alte Musik Berlin, Raphael Alpermann (Organ), Anton Bruckner – Missa solemnis – CD: Accentus ACC 30429, 2017 (Cohrs edition)

== Sources ==
- August Göllerich, Anton Bruckner. Ein Lebens- und Schaffens-Bild, c. 1922 – posthumous edited by Max Auer by G. Bosse, Regensburg, 1932
- Anton Bruckner – Sämtliche Werke, Band XXI: Kleine Kirchenmusikwerke, Musikwissenschaftlicher Verlag der Internationalen Bruckner-Gesellschaft, Hans Bauernfeind and Leopold Nowak (Editor), Vienna, 1984/2001
- Cornelis van Zwol, Anton Bruckner 1824–1896 – Leven en werken, uitg. Thoth, Bussum, Netherlands, 2012. ISBN 978-90-6868-590-9
