= O Du liebes Jesu-Kind =

- Motet by Anton Bruckner
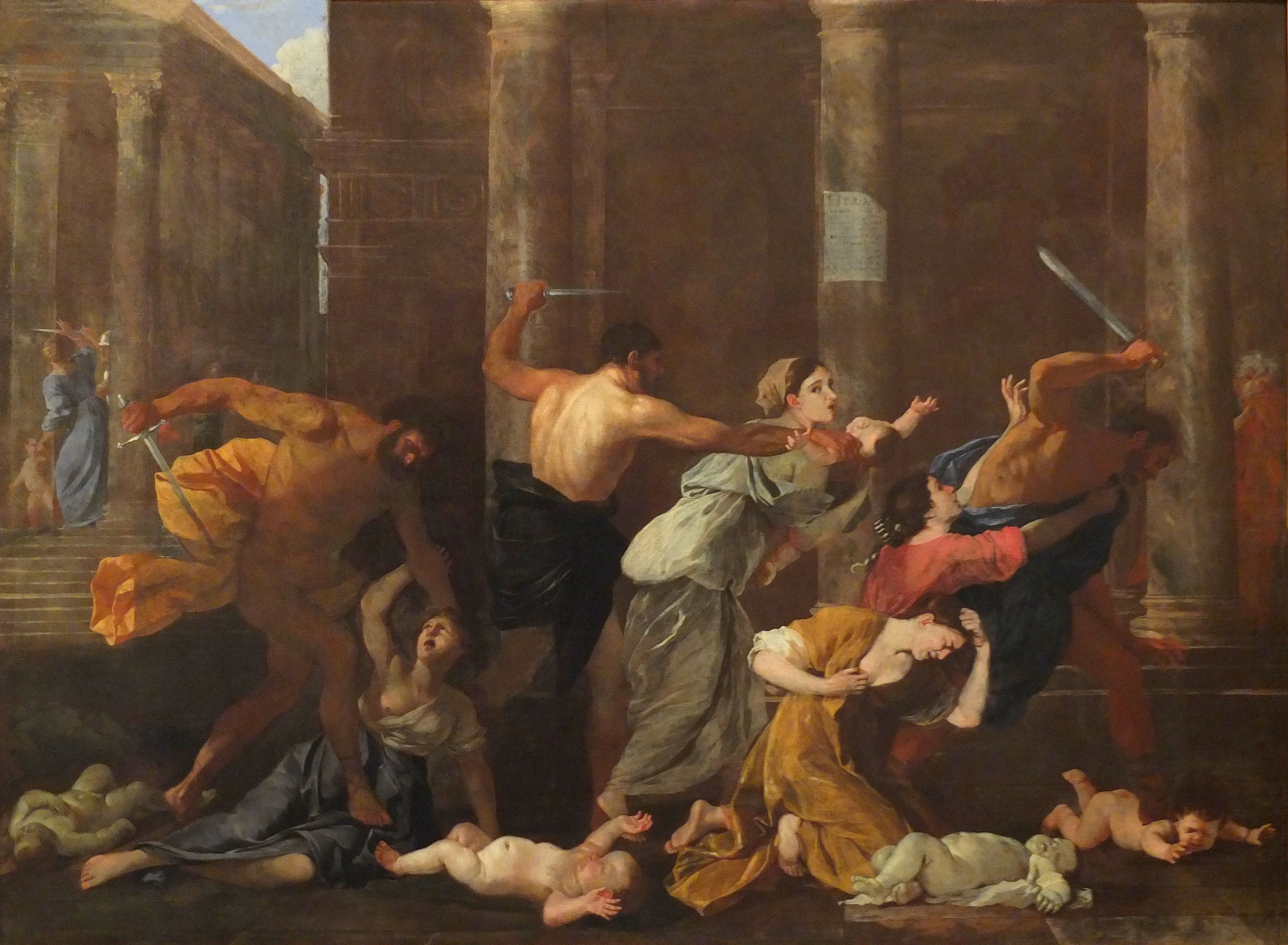
- Massacre des innocents by Nicolas Poussin
- Key: F major
- Catalogue: WAB 145
- Occasion: Holy Innocents' Day
- Language: German
- Composed: c. 1845: St. Florian
- Published: 1932: Regensburg
- Vocal: Soloist
- Instrumental: Organ

O Du liebes Jesu-Kind (O, You dear Child Jesus), WAB 145, is the first of two motets of Anton Bruckner's St. Florian period, which is of uncertain authorship. If Bruckner was the composer, he composed it presumably in 1845–46.

== History ==
If Bruckner composed the motet attributed to him, he wrote it presumably in 1845–46 during his stay in St. Florian Abbey. The work was intended for the celebration of Holy Innocents' Day, remembering the Massacre of the Innocents.

The motet was first published in band II/2, p. 13 of the Göllerich/Auer biography. The last two bars, which are on the back of the manuscript together with a transcription of a Christmas carol, were missing in this first publication. The work appears in Band XXI/10 of the Gesamtausgabe.

== Text ==
O Du liebes Jesu Kind,
Lass Dich vielmals grüßen!
Alle Kinder, die hier sind,
Fallen Dir zu Füßen.
All um Deine Liebe bitten,
Die so viel für uns gelitten.
Schenk uns Deine Liebe!

O, You dear Child Jesus
Let us greet You profusely!
All children here present
Are kneeling down before you.
All pray for Your love,
That suffered for us so much.
Grant us Your love!

== Music ==
The work of 16-bar in F major is scored for soloist and organ.

== Discography ==
- Wilfried Jochens (tenor), Werner Kaufmann (organ), Music of the St. Florian Period (Jürgen Jürgens) - LP: Jerusalem Records ATD 8503, 1984; transferred to CD BSVD-0109, 2011
- Sigrid Hagmüller (alto), Rupert Gottfried Frieberger (organ), Anton Bruckner – Oberösterreichische Kirchenmusik - CD: Fabian Records CD 5112, 1995
- Ludmila Kuznetzova (mezzosoprano), Ludmila Golub (organ), Bruckner: Masses and Songs (Valeri Poliansky) - CD: Chandos CHAN 9863, 1998
- Barbara Schreiner (alto), Rupert Gottfried Frieberger (organ), Anton Bruckner Kirchenmusikalische Werke - CD: Fabian Records CD 5115, c. 2008
- Robert Holzer (Bass), Philipp Sonntag (organ), Anton Bruckner - Lieder|Magnificat - CD: Brucknerhaus LIVA 046, 2011
- Günther Groissböck (bass), Matthias Giesen (organ), In Te Domine Speravi – Gramola CD 99327, 2024
- Karisma Mendoza (soprano), Gustavo Andres (organ) on: Bruckner - Bicentennial Houston CD (St John Vianney Roman Catholic Church, Houston, 11 October 2024) – CD BSA-007

== Sources ==
- August Göllerich, Anton Bruckner. Ein Lebens- und Schaffens-Bild, c. 1922 – posthumous edited by Max Auer by G. Bosse, Regensburg, 1932
- Anton Bruckner – Sämtliche Werke, Band XXI: Kleine Kirchenmusikwerke, Musikwissenschaftlicher Verlag der Internationalen Bruckner-Gesellschaft, Hans Bauernfeind and Leopold Nowak (Editor), Vienna, 1984/2001
- Cornelis van Zwol, Anton Bruckner 1824–1896 – Leven en werken, uitg. Thoth, Bussum, Netherlands, 2012. ISBN 978-90-6868-590-9
