= Salvum fac populum tuum, WAB 40 =

1884 motet composed by Anton Bruckner

Salvum fac populum tuum
- Motet by Anton Bruckner
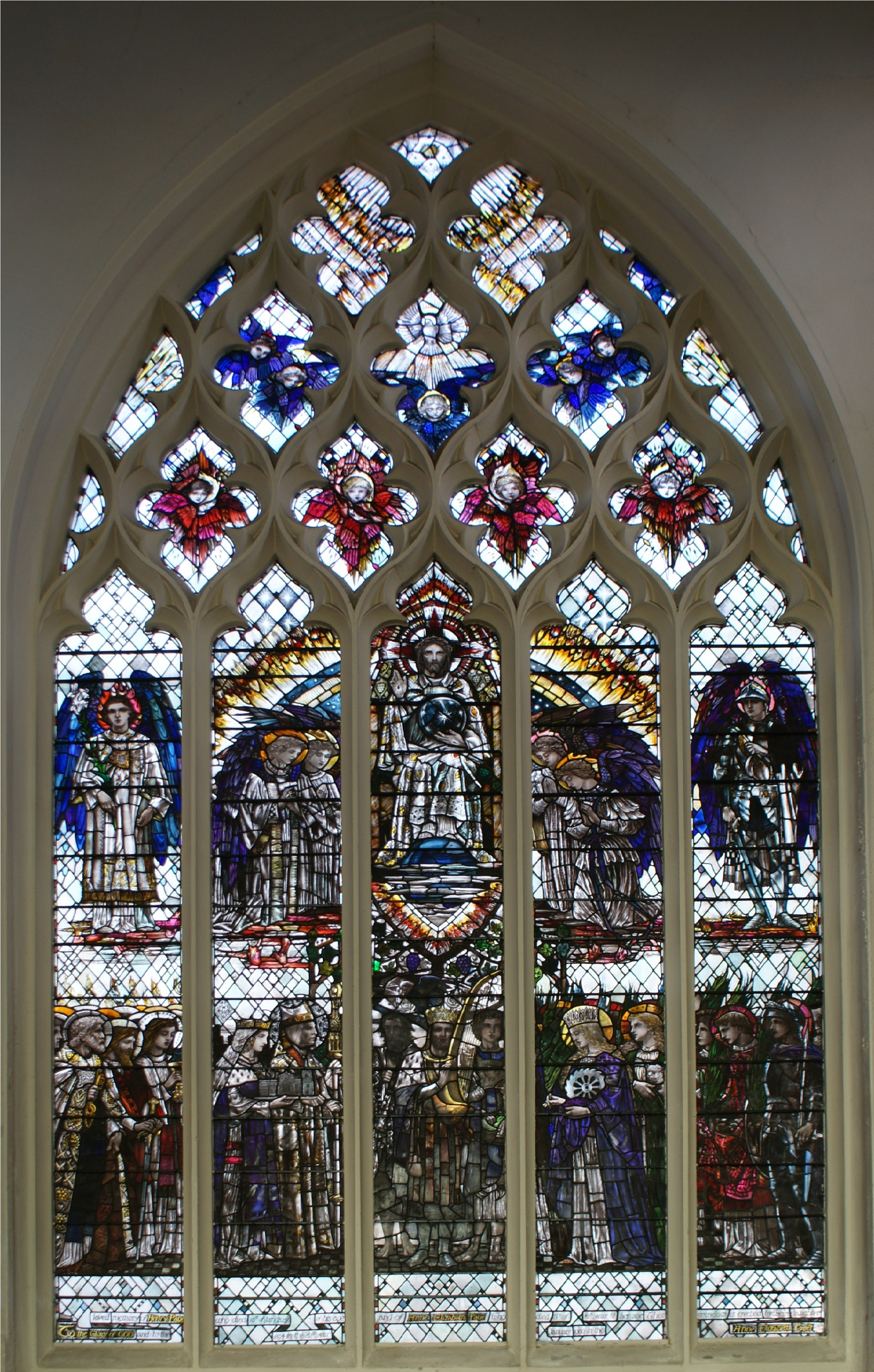
- Te Deum stained glass window - St Mary's church, Ware
- Key: F major
- Catalogue: WAB 40
- Text: Verses of the Te Deum
- Language: Latin
- Composed: November 14, 1884: Vienna
- Published: 1932: Regensburg
- Vocal: SSATB choir

Salvum fac populum tuum ("O Lord, save thy people"; literally "Make your people safe"), WAB 40, is a motet composed by Anton Bruckner in 1884.

== History ==
The motet, based on a few verses of the Te Deum, was composed on 14 November 1884, presumably on request of Franz Xaver Witt for the Cecilian society. The manuscript is archived at the Österreichische Nationalbibliothek. The motet was first published in band IV/2, pp. 496–497 of the Göllerich/Auer biography. It is put in Band XXI/31 of the Gesamtausgabe.

== Music ==
The 57-bar motet in F major for choir a cappella, is based on the verses "Salvum fac populum tuum" till "Quem ad modum speravimus in te." of the Te Deum.

Salvum fac populum tuum
et benedic hereditati tuae, Domine
Et rege eos, et extolle illos usque in aeternum
Per singulos dies benedicimus,
et laudamus nomen tuum in saeculum
et in saeculorum saeculi.

Dignare, Domine, die isto, sine peccato nos custodire.
Miserere nostri, Domine, miserere nostri
Fiat misericordia tua, Domine, super nos
Quem ad modum speravimus in te.

This, a unique composition for Bruckner, which uses the same verses as part 4 of his Te Deum, alternates passages in unison, in Falsobordone and in polyphony.

== Discography ==
There are a few recordings of Bruckner's Salvum fac populum tuum:

- Robert Jones, Choir of St. Bride's Church, Bruckner: Motets – CD: Naxos 8.550956, 1994
- Alois Koch, choir of the St. Hedwig's Cathedral, Anton Bruckner: Messe in e-Moll – CD: Ars Musici 1186-2, 1996 (with accompaniment of trombones)
- Balduin Sulzer, Mozart Chor Linz, Bruckner – CD: AtemMusik Records ATMU 97001, 1997
- Hans-Christoph Rademann, NDR Chor Hamburg, Anton Bruckner: Ave Maria – CD: Carus 83.151, 2000
- Philipp von Steinäcker, Vocalensemble Musica Saeculorum, Bruckner: Pange lingua - Motetten - CD: Fra Bernardo FB 1501271, 2015
- Sigvards Klava, Latvian Radio Choir, Bruckner: Latin Motets, 2019 – CD Ondine OD 1362
- Christian Erny, The Zurich Chamber Singers, Bruckner Spectrum - CD : Berlin Classics LC06203, 2022

== Sources ==
- August Göllerich, Anton Bruckner. Ein Lebens- und Schaffens-Bild, c. 1922 – posthumous edited by Max Auer by G. Bosse, Regensburg, 1932
- Anton Bruckner – Sämtliche Werke, Band XXI: Kleine Kirchenmusikwerke, Musikwissenschaftlicher Verlag der Internationalen Bruckner-Gesellschaft, Hans Bauernfeind and Leopold Nowak (Editor), Vienna, 1984/2001
- Cornelis van Zwol, Anton Bruckner 1824–1896 – Leven en werken, uitg. Thoth, Bussum, Netherlands, 2012. ISBN 978-90-6868-590-9
- Uwe Harten, Anton Bruckner. Ein Handbuch. Residenz Verlag, Salzburg, 1996. ISBN 3-7017-1030-9
