= Frankfurter Kantorei =

German mixed concert choir

- Choir
- Origin: Frankfurt
- Founded: 1961
- Genre: Mixed concert choir
- Chief conductor: Kurt Thomas; Wolfgang Schäfer; Winfried Toll

Frankfurter Kantorei (Frankfurt chorale) is a German mixed concert choir established in 1961 by Kurt Thomas in Frankfurt. In 1969, Helmuth Rilling assumed leadership, and the choir began recording the complete Bach cantatas in 1972. From 1982 to 1997, Wolfgang Schäfer was artistic director of the Frankfurter Kantorei. Since then it has been led by Winfried Toll. The choir has performed concert tours abroad in Paris, Lyon, Venice, Turin, Vienna, Helsinki, St Petersburg, Istanbul, Los Angeles, Seattle and Toronto, among others, and first appeared in Israel in 1979. The group has made numerous CD recordings on the EMI Classics label. In 2000 they were a recipient of the Binding Kulturpreis, and in May 2000, they performed Brecht/Weill's Three Penny Opera at the Musiktriennale Köln of Cologne. The choir has a membership of about 70.

In 1995, the ladies of the choir performed in a live recording of Zemlisky's opera Der Zwerg (The Dwarf), with the Gürzenich-Orchester, conducted by James Conlon.

In 2007, the Kantorei took part in an audio play Doktor Faustus – Das Leben des deutschen Tonsetzers Adrian Leverkühn erzählt von einem Freunde with music by Hermann Kretzschmar.

On 3 April 2009, the choir performed in Tel Aviv in a concert commemorating the hundredth anniversary of the foundation of the city in a Mann Auditorium. The program contained Mozart's Requiem and Mendelssohn's Die erste Walpurgisnacht, with the Israel Chamber Orchestra.

== Recording ==
The choir performed recordings of Bach cantatas with Thomas and Rilling. Conducted by Wolfgang Schäfer, they recorded Joseph Rheinberger's Missae et Cantiones, a Mass and sacred pieces.
