= SWR Vokalensemble =

SWR Vokalensemble is the vocal ensemble of the broadcaster Südwestrundfunk (SWR), based in Stuttgart, Germany. It was founded in 1946 as Südfunk-Chor Stuttgart to perform studio work for Süddeutscher Rundfunk (SDR) which merged in 1998 with the Südwestfunk to form the SWR.

The ensemble was awarded the Echo Klassik in both 2011 and 2012.

== Conductors ==
- Marinus Voorberg (1975–1981)
- Klaus Martin Ziegler (1981–1986)
- Rupert Huber (1990–2000)
- Marcus Creed (2003–2020)
- Yuval Weinberg since 2020
