= Wolfgang Schäfer =

German choral conductor and academic (born 1945)

- Born: 7 April 1945 (age 81); Staufen im Breisgau, Germany
- Education: Hochschule für Musik Freiburg
- Occupations: Choral conductor; Academic teacher
- Organizations: Hochschule für Musik Freiburg; Freiburger Vokalensemble; BosArt Trio; Hochschule für Musik und Darstellende Kunst Frankfurt am Main; Frankfurter Kantorei; Frankfurter Kammerchor

Wolfgang Schäfer (born 7 April 1945) is a German choral conductor and academic teacher. He founded the Freiburger Vokalensemble, the BosArt Trio, and the Frankfurter Kammerchor. From 1982 to 2008, he was professor for choral conducting at the Hochschule für Musik und Darstellende Kunst Frankfurt am Main.

== Career ==
Born in Staufen im Breisgau, Schäfer studied music education, voice and choral conducting in Freiburg im Breisgau, and orchestral conducting in Stuttgart. He was a teacher at the Hochschule für Musik Freiburg from 1971 to 1982. He has been the artistic director of the Freiburger Vokalensemble, which he founded in 1971.

In 1982 Schäfer was appointed professor for choral conducting at the Hochschule für Musik und Darstellende Kunst Frankfurt am Main (HfMDK, Frankfurt University of Music and Performing Arts), succeeding Helmuth Rilling. In that capacity he conducted both the choir and the chamber choir of the Hochschule. He performed concerts with the chamber choir of the MfMDK at the university and also in the Rhein-Main Region, such as 2007 in St. Martin, Idstein, a program of mostly psalm compositions, Das ist mir lieb (Psalm 116) by Heinrich Schütz, Warum ist das Licht gegeben dem Mühseligen? by Brahms, Eli Eli (based on Psalm 22) by Georgius Bárdos, Bruckner's Os justi (Psalm 37:19–20), and Bach's Lobet den Herrn, alle Heiden (Psalm 117). Among his students are Peter Reulein, Christoph Siebert and Dan Zerfaß. In 2008, after 26 years of teaching, he conducted in a farewell concert Schicksalslied by Brahms and Schubert's Mass in A flat major.

Also in 1982 he was the director of the Frankfurter Kantorei, succeeding Kurt Thomas and Rilling. He conducted the choir until 1997. In 2008 he founded the Frankfurter Kammerchor. Schäfer has been a juror at international music competitions. He has been the artistic director of the annual Staufener Musikwoche in his hometown. Since his student days, Schäfer has also been a member of the musical comedy group BosArt Trio.

In 1984 Schäfer conducted the premiere of the Kurt Hessenberg's Mass with the Frankfurter Kantorei in the studio of the Hessischer Rundfunk.

In 1990 he recorded Telemann's cantata Die Tageszeiten with Mechthild Bach, Mechthild Georg, Hans Peter Blochwitz, Johannes Mannov, the Freiburger Vokalensemble and Collegium Musicum, the second commercial recording of the cantata. In 2003 he recorded Telemann's Passion Das selige Erwägen des bittern Leiden und Sterbens Jesu Christi with Barbara Locher, Zeger Vandersteene, Stefan Dörr, Berthold Possemeyer, Jesus-Rene Schmidt, the Freiburger Vokalensemble and L'arpa festante, then probably the only recording of the work.

After retiring from the Musikhochschule Frankfurt, Schäfer founded the Frankfurter Kammerchor, mostly formed by alumni of the Hochschule. He conducted the chamber choir in concerts in the Limburg Cathedral and the Stiftskirche, Stuttgart, among others. He designed a program for Advent which includes several settings of Ave Maria and Jan Sandström's Es ist ein Ros entsprungen.

== Awards ==
- 1981: BBC competition "Let the Peoples Sing", first prize with the Freiburger Vokalensemble
- 1984: Wettbewerb der Europäischen Rundfunkunion, first prize with the Freiburger Vokalensemble

== Discography ==
Freiburger Vokalensemble

- Anton Bruckner: Motetten. EOM, Freiburg 1980
- Das deutsche Chorlied um 1600. Christophorus, Freiburg 1982
- Anton Bruckner: Motetten. Christophorus, Freiburg 1984
- Hector Berlioz: Lélio. Radio-Sinfonie-Orchester Frankfurt, Eliahu Inbal. Denon, 1987
- Georg Philipp Telemann: Die Tageszeiten. BMG Ariola, Hamburg 1990
- Cristóbal de Morales: Geistliche Werke. Christophorus, Freiburg 1990
- Johannes Brahms: Zigeunerlieder. Sonomaster, Stuttgart 1991
- Johannes Brahms: Deutsche Volkslieder. Bayer, Bietigheim-Bissingen 1996
- Musik-Dokumente 1970 - 2003 aus der Freiburger Pauluskirche. Notabene, Freiburg 2003
- Georg Philipp Telemann: Das selige Erwägen des bittern Leidens und Sterbens Jesu Christi. Sonomaster, Stuttgart 2003
- Joseph Rheinberger: Vom Goldenen Horn. Carus, Stuttgart 2005
- Conradin Kreutzer: Goethes "Faust". Gesänge. ARTS

Frankfurter Kantorei

- Arthur Honegger: Le Roi David. Christophorus, Freiburg 1985
- Gustav Mahler: Symphony No. 3. Radio-Sinfonie-Orchester Frankfurt, Inbal. Denon, Ratingen 1987
- Hector Berlioz: Lélio. Radio-Sinfonie-Orchester Frankfurt, Inbal. Denon, 1987
- Igor Stravinsky: Les noces; Carl Orff: Catulli Carmina. Koch, München 1990
- Harald Genzmer: Deutsche Messe. Cappella, Wiesbaden 1993
- Antonín Dvořák: Mass in D major. Freiburger Musik-Forum, Freiburg 1993
- Joseph Rheinberger: Mass in F minor; Sechs religiöse Gesänge; Requiem in d-Moll. Stuttgart, Carus 1998
- Felix Mendelssohn: Die erste Walpurgisnacht. Städtisches Opernhaus- und Museumsorchester, Sylvain Cambreling. Frankfurter Museums-Gesellschaft 2001

BosArt Trio

- Unerhörte Meisterwerke. 1984
- Ein Schluck aus dem Opernglas. 1987
- Scherzo wie Watsche. 1991
- Musik von A bis Zett. 1994
- Insalata Mista. 1998
- Die Fledermaus und das Phantom. 2000
- Bach Blüten. 2001
