= Prague Chamber Choir =

The Prague Chamber Choir (Pražský komorní sbor) is a Czech choir founded in Prague in 1990 by singers of the Prague Philharmonic Choir.
It has performed concerts in Australia, Brazil, Israel, Japan, Lebanon and many European countries (e.g. Wexford Festival Opera, Rossini Opera Festival).
