= Marcus Creed =

English conductor

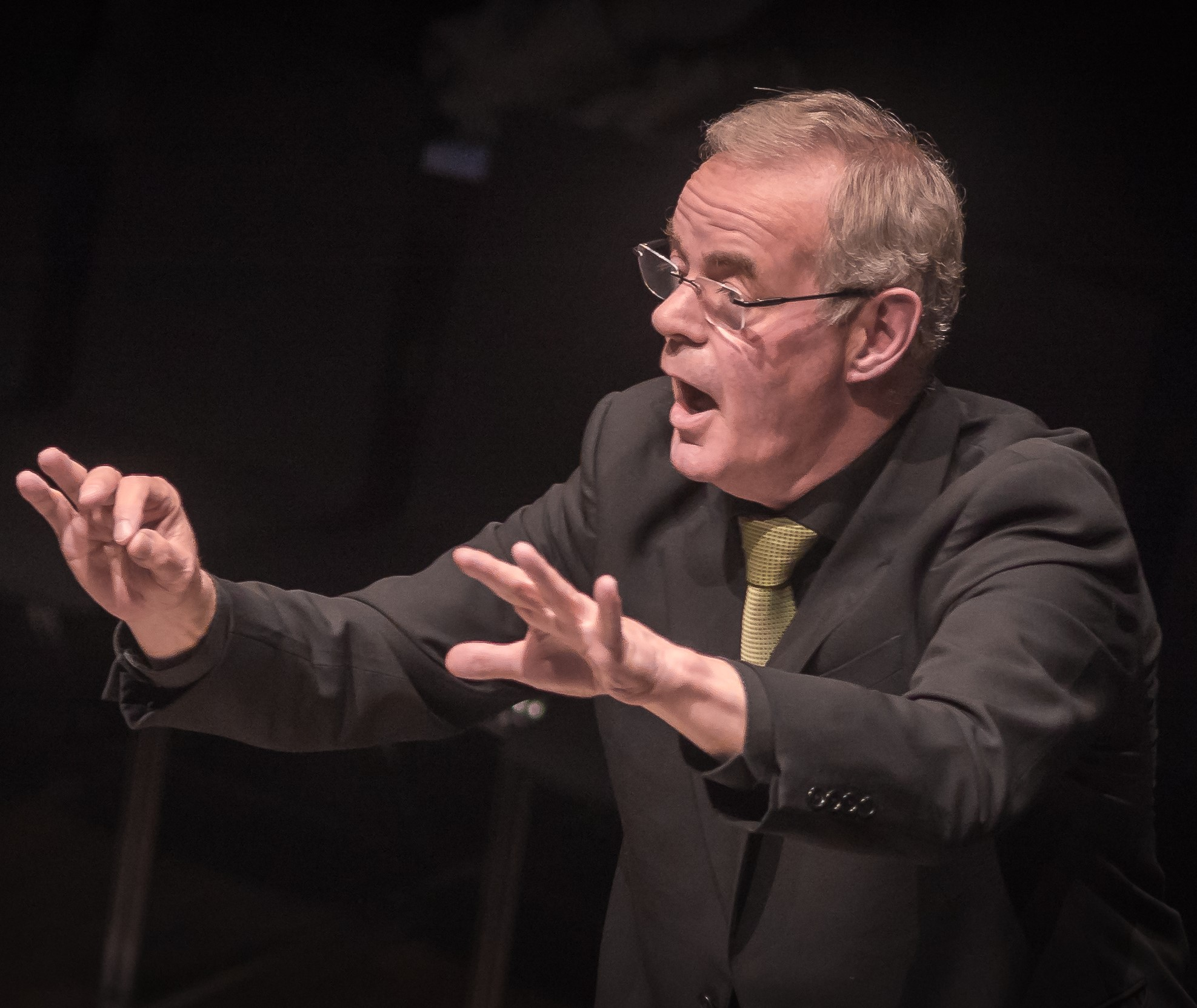
- Creed in 2017
- Born: 19 April 1951 (age 75); Eastbourne, Sussex, England
- Occupations: Conductor; Academic teacher
- Organizations: Deutsche Oper Berlin; RIAS Kammerchor; SWR Vokalensemble Stuttgart; Hochschule für Musik Köln

Marcus Creed (born 19 April 1951) is an English conductor and academic teacher who has worked mostly in Germany.

Born in Eastbourne, Sussex (Southeast England), he was educated at Eastbourne Grammar School, King's College, Cambridge, Christ Church, Oxford, and Guildhall School in London. He moved to Germany in 1976 and worked firstly as a coach and chorusmaster at the Deutsche Oper Berlin. From 1987 to 2001 he was artistic director of the RIAS Kammerchor and worked with the Berlin Scharoun Ensemble as a pianist and conductor and conducted the Staatskapelle Berlin and Deutsches Symphonie-Orchester Berlin as well as the Akademie für Alte Musik Berlin.

In 2003, he was appointed artistic director of the SWR Vokalensemble Stuttgart. He was appointed chief conductor of the Danish National Vocal Ensemble in 2014 with whom he recorded the Vocal music by Olivier Messiaen and won a Diapason d'Or. Since 1998 he has also been a professor for choral conducting at the Hochschule für Musik Köln.

== Awards ==
- 2022 Georg-Friedrich-Händel-Ring
