= Uwe Gronostay =

German choral conductor and composer

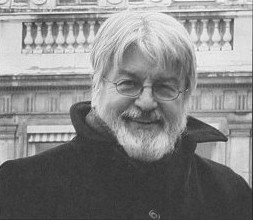
- The conductor in 2005
- Born: 25 October 1939; Hildesheim, Germany
- Died: 29 November 2008 (aged 69)
- Occupations: choral conductor and composer
- Known for: professor of choral conducting in Frankfurt and at the Hochschule der Künste Berlin
- Notable work: conducted the Philharmonischer Chor Berlin and the Nederlands Kamerkoor in Amsterdam

Uwe Gronostay (25 October 1939 – 29 November 2008) was a German choral conductor and composer.

Born in Hildesheim, he grew up in Braunschweig and was already organist of the Jakobikirche at age 15. He studied church music in Bremen and worked as church musician, organ teacher and freelance worker for Radio Bremen. In 1972 he was appointed director of the RIAS Kammerchor. He also conducted from 1982 to 2002 the Philharmonischer Chor Berlin, and from 1987 to 1998 the Nederlands Kamerkoor in Amsterdam.

He was a professor of choral conducting in Frankfurt, later from 1989 and 2003 at the Hochschule der Künste Berlin.
