= Philipp Ahmann =

German conductor

- Born: 1974 (age 50–51)
- Education: Musikhochschule Köln
- Occupation: Choral conductor
- Organizations: MDR Rundfunkchor Leipzig

Philipp Ahmann (born 1974) is a German conductor, especially known as a choral conductor. He has been the director of the NDR Chor from 2008 to 2018. Since 2020, Ahmann is the MDR Rundfunkchor's artistic director.

== Career ==
Ahmann studied conducting at the Musikhochschule Köln with Marcus Creed.

He began to work with radio choirs in 2005 and has worked with the SWR Vokalensemble, the WDR Rundfunkchor Köln and the Rundfunkchor Berlin. In 2008 he was appointed director of the NDR Chor in Hamburg and created a concert series of the choir. From 2013 to 2016, he was also first guest conductor of the MDR Rundfunkchor in Leipzig. He led recordings of the NDR Chor and the MDR Chor. As of January 2020, he is the artistic director of the MDR Rundfunkchor.
