= Dan-Olof Stenlund =

Swedish university professor and choir conductor

- Born: 25 October 1937 (age 88); Skellefteå, Sweden
- Occupation: Conductor
- Years active: 1961–present

Dan-Olof Bertil Stenlund (born 25 October 1937 in Skellefteå) is a Swedish university professor and choir conductor.

== Life and work ==
Dan-Olof Stenlund, was born in 1937 in Skellefteå, the son of the cantor Bertil Stenlund and his wife Esther Vikström. He studied at the Royal Swedish Academy of Music in Stockholm, piano, organ, cello and vocals and graduated as a church musician, accompanist and music educator, followed by studies in conducting with Eric Ericson, Leonard Bernstein and Sergiu Celibidache.

Stenlund took the position of professor of choral conducting at the Royal Danish Academy of Music in Copenhagen at the age of 36 years. He is also a teacher of choral conducting at the Music Academy in Malmö, and a member of the Royal Academy of Music. From 1961 to 1974 he was active as a church musician at Engelbrekt Church in Stockholm.

As an educated conductor and choirmaster, Dan-Olof Stenlund taught at the State Academy of Music in Malmö and directs the local Chamber Choir, the Malmö Chamber Choir, also the Landesjugendchor of Baden-Württemberg. He repeatedly seeks dialogue with students and supports talented young musicians.

== Awards ==
- 1977: Norrby Medal
- 1995: Choirmaster of the Year

== Conducting activities ==
- KFUM: Chamber Choir 1957-1974
- Sangesgruppe Spiralerna 1961-1965
- Uppsala Academic Chamber Choir 1961-1974
- KFUM Choir in Stockholm 1965-1974
- Malmö Chamber Choir 1975 -
- Malmö Symfonieorchester Choir 1975-1993
