= Arnold Schoenberg Choir =

Austrian choir

- Choir
- Origin: Vienna
- Founded: 1972
- Genre: Professional mixed choir
- Chief conductor: Erwin Ortner
- Awards: Mozartinterpretationspreis; Diapason d'Or; Grammy Award for Best Choral Performance
- Website: www.asc.at

The Arnold Schoenberg Choir (German: Arnold Schoenberg Chor) is a Viennese/Austrian choir which was founded 1972 by Erwin Ortner, who is still its artistic director. The choir has a high reputation both among conductors and among critics and the musical scene in general. All members of the choir have broad experience and expertise in vocal music; most of them have graduated from or are currently studying at the Vienna University of Music and Performing Arts. The choir is named after Viennese composer Arnold Schoenberg.

== Repertoire ==
The choir's repertoire covers a wide range from Renaissance to contemporary music, from a cappella works to large orchestral pieces and operas. The choir has worked with famous conductors such as Claudio Abbado, Riccardo Muti and Lorin Maazel – to name only a few. Moreover, it has performed in opera productions such as Schubert's Fierrabras at the Vienna State Opera, Messiaen's Saint François d'Assise and Berio's Cronaca del luogo at the Salzburg Festival and videos of three operas of Mozart with the producer Peter Sellars.

The Arnold Schoenberg Chor has had a close working relationship with Nikolaus Harnoncourt for more than 20 years. During this period they have performed and recorded such pieces as Bach's Mass in B minor, Monteverdi's Vespers, Haydn's The Creation and Seasons, Beethoven's Missa Solemnis and Ninth Symphony and Brahms's Ein deutsches Requiem. They also cooperated in operas like Purcell's Dido and Aeneas, Handel's Samson, and Beethoven's Fidelio. They performed Fidelio in Madrid with Claudio Abbado in 2008. On the occasion of Harnoncourt's 80th birthday the choir appeared in his recording of Gershwin's Porgy and Bess.

== Activities ==
The choir frequently embarks on concert tours around the world. It has appeared at festivals like the Salzburg Festival, Carinthian Summer, styriarte, the Wiener Festwochen and Wien Modern for many years.

The choir performed in 2007 in Janáček's From the House of the Dead with the Mahler Chamber Orchestra, conducted by Pierre Boulez, which was also recorded on DVD, in a co-production of the Vienna Festival, the Aix-en-Provence Festival, the Holland Festival, the Metropolitan Opera and La Scala.

In 1996, the choir, conducted by its Chorus Master Erwin Ortner, recorded Schubert's complete secular choral works for Teldec on 7 CDs. This recording won the "Preis der deutschen Schallplattenkritik" in Germany, the "Diapason d'Or" in France, the "Prix Caecilia" in Belgium and the "Grand Prize of the Academy Awards" 1997 in Japan.

== Awards ==
In 1989 the Arnold Schoenberg Choir was awarded the Mozartinterpretationspreis of the Mozart Society of Vienna. In 1994, the Schoenberg Chor received the Classical Music Award as best choir of the year. In 2002 the Schoenberg choir, jointly with instrumentalists and soloists, received a Grammy Award in the category Best Choral Performance for its recording of Bach's St Matthew Passion, conducted by Nikolaus Harnoncourt.

== Sources ==
- Official website
- Review in The Guardian
