= Erwin Ortner =

Austrian conductor (born 1947)

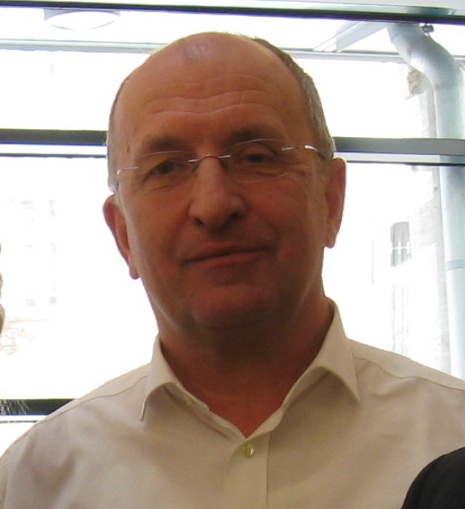
Ortner in 2009

Erwin Ortner (born 15 December 1947, in Vienna) is an Austrian conductor, especially of vocal music. He is the founder and artistic director of the Arnold Schoenberg Chor.
