= Monstrance =

Vessel used to display religious object in the Christian tradition

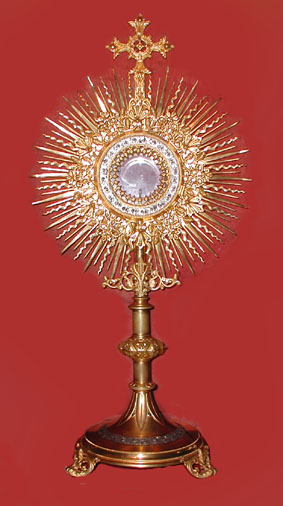
A traditional "solar" monstrance

A monstrance, also known as an ostensorium (or an ostensory), is a vessel used in Roman Catholic, Old Catholic, High Church Lutheran and Anglican churches for ostension, e.g., the display on an altar of some object of piety, such as the consecrated Eucharistic Sacramental bread (host) during Eucharistic adoration or during the Benediction of the Blessed Sacrament. A monstrance may also serve as a reliquary for the public display of relics of some saints. The word monstrance comes from the Latin word monstrare, while the word ostensorium comes from the Latin word ostendere. Either term, each expressing the concept of "showing", can refer to a vessel intended for the exposition of the Blessed Sacrament, but ostensorium has only this meaning.

== Liturgical context ==
In the Catholic tradition, at the moment of consecration the elements (called "gifts" for liturgical purposes) are transformed (literally transubstantiated) into the body and blood of Christ. Catholic doctrine holds that the elements are not only spiritually transformed, but are (substantially) transformed into the body and blood of Christ. Although the elements retain the appearance, or accidents of bread and wine, they become the body and blood of Christ. The presence of Jesus Christ God in the Eucharist is known as the doctrine of the Corporeal Presence within the Roman Catholic Magisterium. The Corporeal Presence is believed to be real (in Latin: realiter) and of the whole (totaliter) Christ, in Body, Soul and Spirit. The name "Corporeal Presence" concerns the Corporal reserved to the chalice, paten and the ciborium during the Holy Mass.

Other Christians (notably in the Anglican Church, Old Catholic Church, and Lutheran Church) accept the doctrine of the Real Presence, whilst rejecting transubstantiation as a philosophical concept (cf. sacramental union). Owing to these beliefs, the consecrated elements are given the same adoration and devotion that Christians of these traditions accord to Christ himself.

Within churches of these traditions the reserved sacrament serves as a focal point of religious devotion. In many of them, during Eucharistic adoration, the celebrant displays the sacrament in the monstrance, typically on the altar. When not being displayed, the reserved sacrament is locked in a tabernacle (more common in Roman Catholicism) or aumbry (more common in the other traditions mentioned).

== Use and design ==
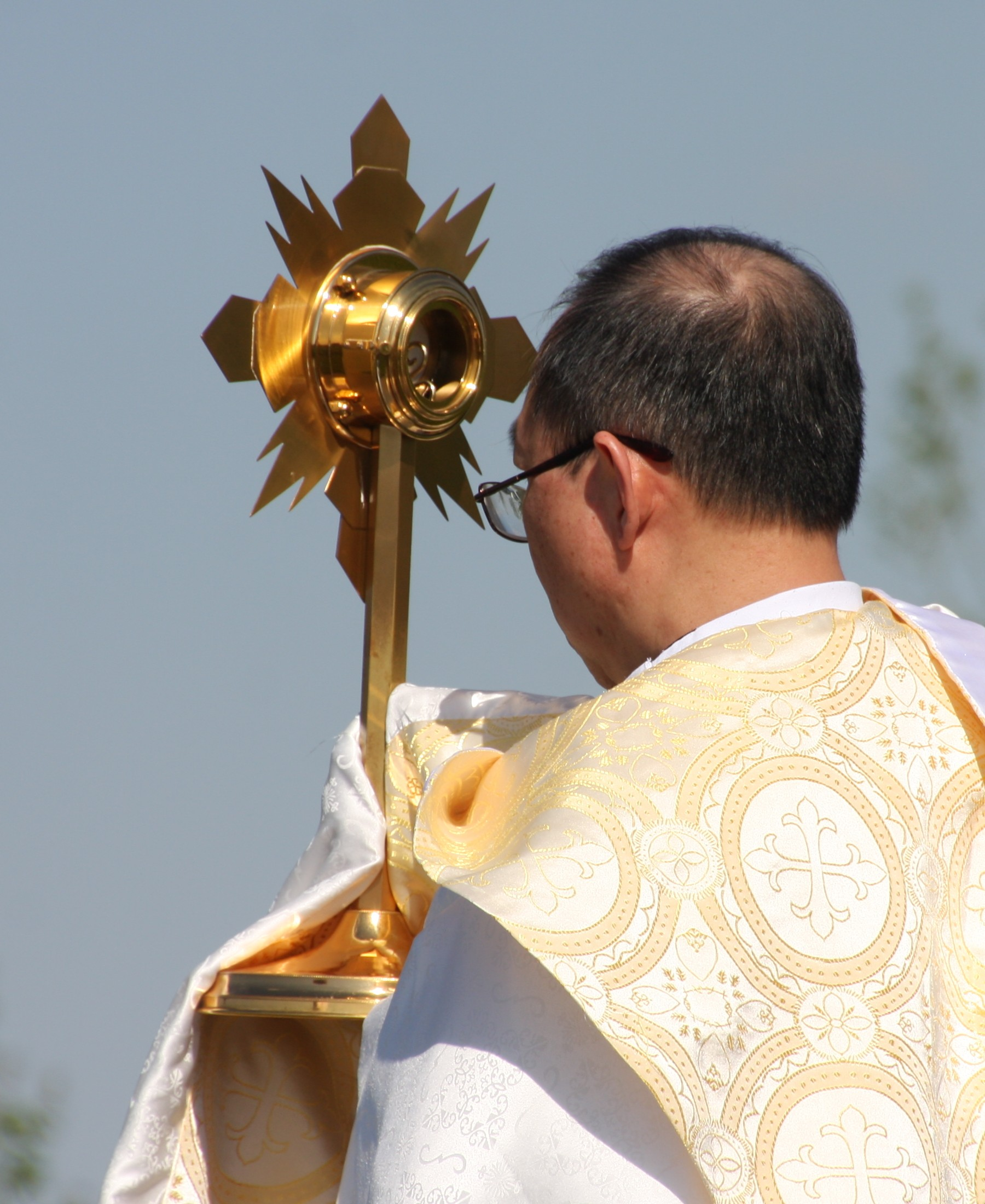
The Blessed Sacrament in a monstrance carried in a procession by a priest wearing a humeral veil

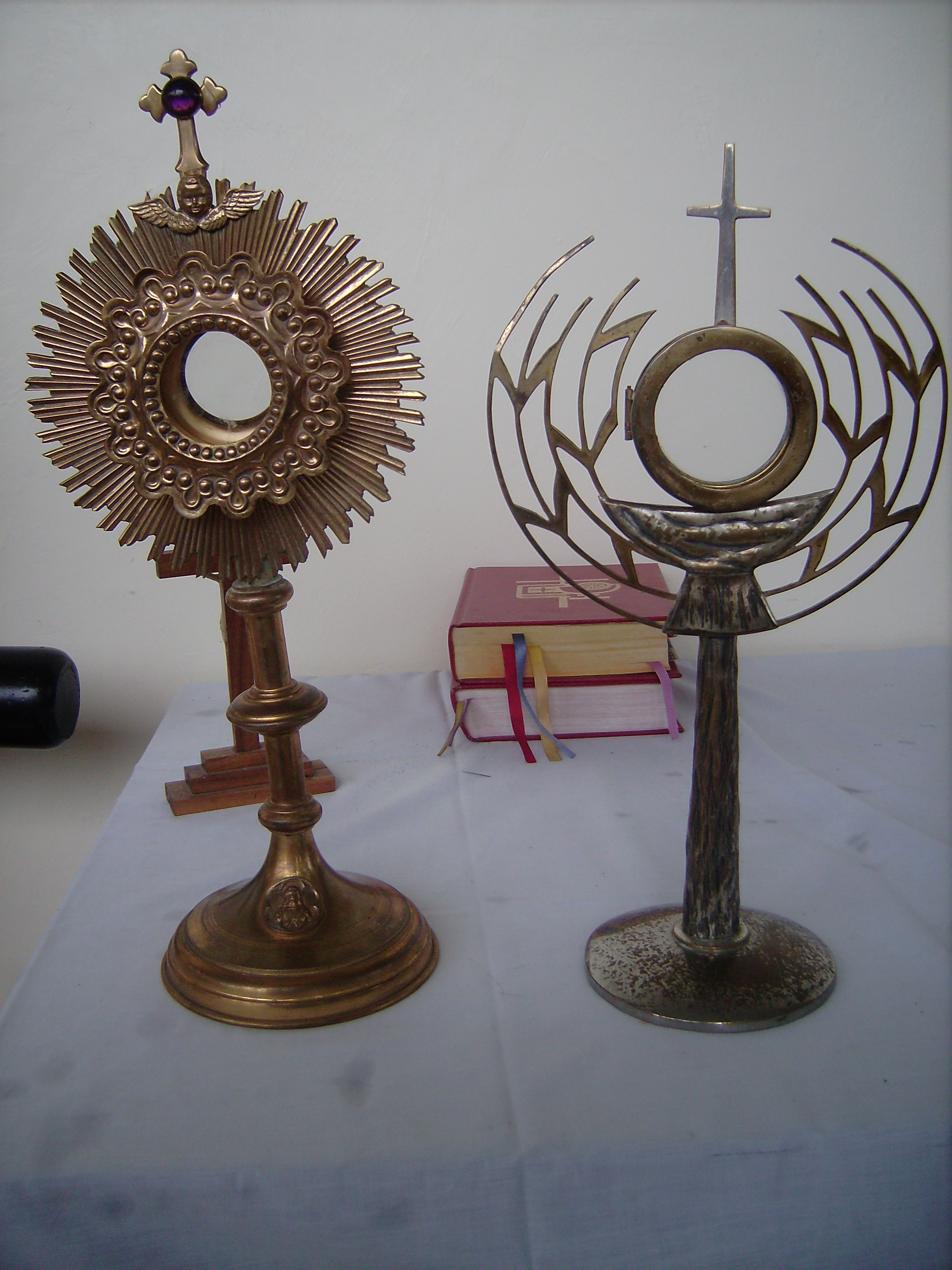
Two monstrances, showing the contrast between the modern simplified design on the right with its more ornate predecessor on the left

In the service of benediction, (the priest blesses the people with the Eucharist displayed in the monstrance). This blessing differs from the priest's blessing, as it is seen to be the blessing by Christ rather than that of the individual priest. The exposition of the monstrance during Benediction is traditionally accompanied by chanting or singing of the hymn Tantum Ergo.

Monstrances are usually elaborate in design; most are carried by the priest. Others may be much larger fixed constructions, typically for displaying the host in a special side chapel, often called the "Chapel of the Blessed Sacrament". For portable designs, the preferred form is a sunburst on a stand, usually topped by a cross.

Before the Council of Trent, the most common design was the tower. The sun design would come to dominate the shape of modern monstrances after it became clear that the ostensorium could be better adapted to the object of drawing all eyes to the Sacred Host itself by making the transparent portion of the vessel just of the size required, and surrounded, like the sun, with rays. Monstrances of this shape, dating from the fifteenth century, are also not uncommon, and for several hundred years past this has been by far the commonest form in practical use.

Medieval monstrances were more varied in form than contemporary ones. Those used for relics, and occasionally for the host, typically had a crystal cylinder in a golden stand, and those usually used for hosts had a crystal window in a flat-faced golden construction, which could stand on its base. The monstrance was most often made of silver-gilt or other precious metal, and highly decorated. In the center of the sunburst, the monstrance normally has a small round glass the size of a host, through which the Blessed Sacrament can be seen. Behind this glass is a holder made of gilded metal, called a lunette or lunula, which holds the host securely in place. When not in the monstrance, the host in its lunula is placed in a special standing container, called a standing pyx, in the Tabernacle. Before the current design, earlier "little shrines" or reliquaries of various shapes and sizes were used.

== Noted monstrances ==
- The monstrance of Corpus Christi at the Cathedral of Valencia (Spain) - Every year, during the Corpus Christi procession in Valencia, the largest Monstrance in the world, made of 600 kilograms (1,300 lb) of silver, 5 kilograms (11 lb) of gold, 75 grams (2.6 oz) of platinum, hundreds of precious stones and thousands of pearls, runs through the streets of Valencia under a shower of flower petals.
- La Lechuga is a monstrance built between 1700 and 1707 that is currently owned by the Banco de la Republica of Colombia. It consists of 9 kilograms (20 lb) of 18 karat gold, 1,485 emeralds which gave the name to the piece due to its color, and other gems from various parts of the world.
- The Cathedral of Toledo, Spain, boasts one of the most famous monstrances in European medieval history. Made of pure gold (the first gold brought over from the New World by Admiral Christopher Columbus) and encrusted with several jewels, it has merited several papal processions, acclamations and uses. Most recently among these is Pope Benedict XVI in his World Youth Day Apostolic Visit in 2011. It has also been immortalized in several 18th-century and 19th-century devotional handbooks. This portable monstrance (or ostensory) is housed within a second, fixed monstrance made of partially gilded silver.
- The Vatican monstrance (Latin: Ostensorio Vaticana) of is one of the most exquisite monstrances used by recent popes, as it is an exact miniature of the Baldachin inside St. Peter's Basilica. It is complete in ornamentation including the angels adorning its rooftop. It was most recently used by Pope Benedict XVI.
- Raymond Nonnatus and Clare of Assisi are often portrayed with monstrances. Nonnatus used a Gothic box-style monstrance while Clare is often portrayed with a solar version.
- Founderess of the Eternal World Television Network, Mother Angelica of the Annunciation, was often portrayed with a golden solar monstrance pendant.
- The Church of St. Stanislaus Kostka, one of Chicago's famed Polish Cathedrals, is home to one of the largest monstrances in the world, a 9-foot-wide (2.7 m) Iconic Monstrance of Our Lady of the Sign. It is part of the planned Sanctuary of The Divine Mercy, which is being constructed adjacent to the church. The Monstrance is to be installed in the sanctuary's adoration chapel, to be the focus of 24-hour Eucharistic Adoration. The clergy will conduct no liturgies or vocal prayers in the chapel, either by individuals or groups, as the space is meant for private meditation and contemplation.
- In the treasury at the St. Loreta Church in Prague, there is on display a monstrance featuring 6,000 diamonds.
- On top of the main dome of the Mariavite Temple of Mercy and Charity in Płock, Poland, is a large monstrance. The monstrance is adorned with four angels, each measuring almost 4 feet (1.2 m) in height. The following Polish phrase is inscribed below the monstrance: Adorujmy Chrystusa Króla panującego nad narodami (in English, "Let us adore Christ the King reigning over all nations".)
- Perrot's Ostensorium was presented by 17th-century fur trader Nicolas Perrot to the priests at the Saint Francis Xavier Mission in 1686, located at what is now modern Green Bay, Wisconsin. It was buried by the priests when the local Indians became hostile and burned the mission buildings. It was dug up by accident in 1802 and is currently in the Neville Public Museum in Green Bay, Wisconsin. It is the oldest surviving physical artifact of French settlement west of the Alleghenies.

== Gallery ==
=== For displaying the sacred host ===
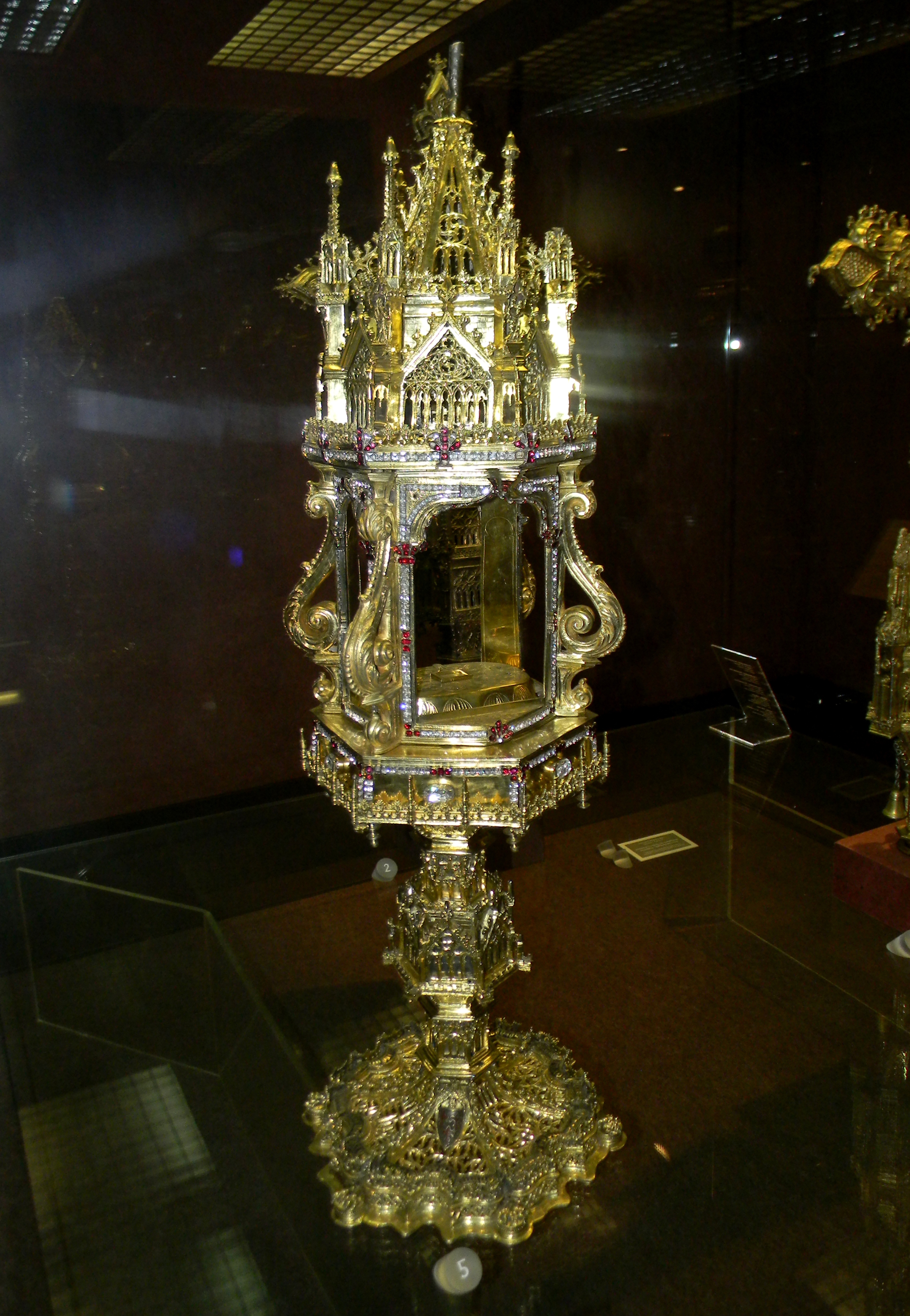
Monstrance given to the Monastery of Alcobaça by Dom João Dornelas in 1412, with some later additions during the baroque period, National Museum of Ancient Art, Portugal

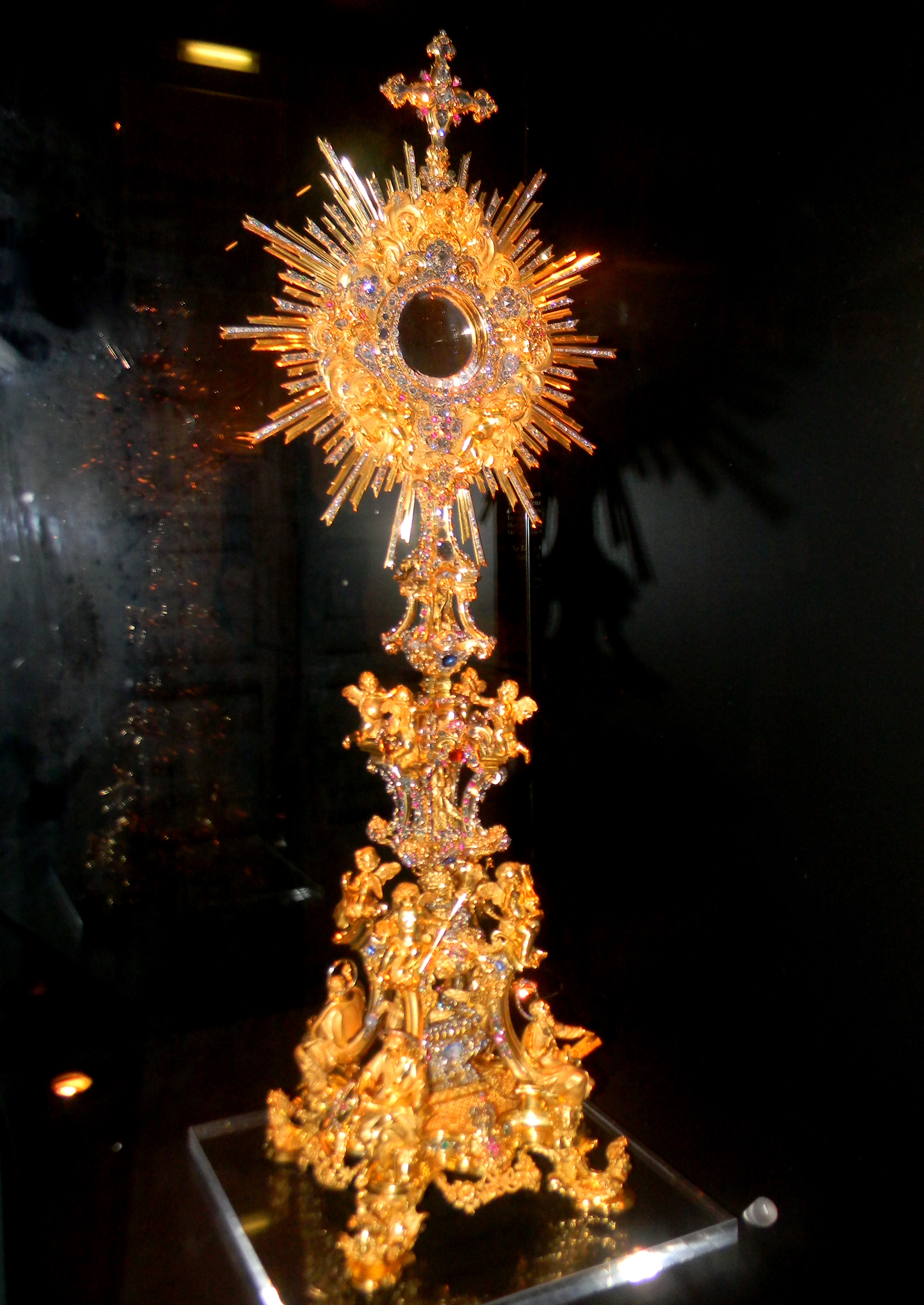
The large Patriarchal Monstrance was a gift from king D. João V to the Patriarchal Cathedral of Lisbon, and is made of solid gold, diamonds, rubies, sapphires and emeralds. It was commissioned in 1748, Lisbon Cathedral Museum, Portugal.

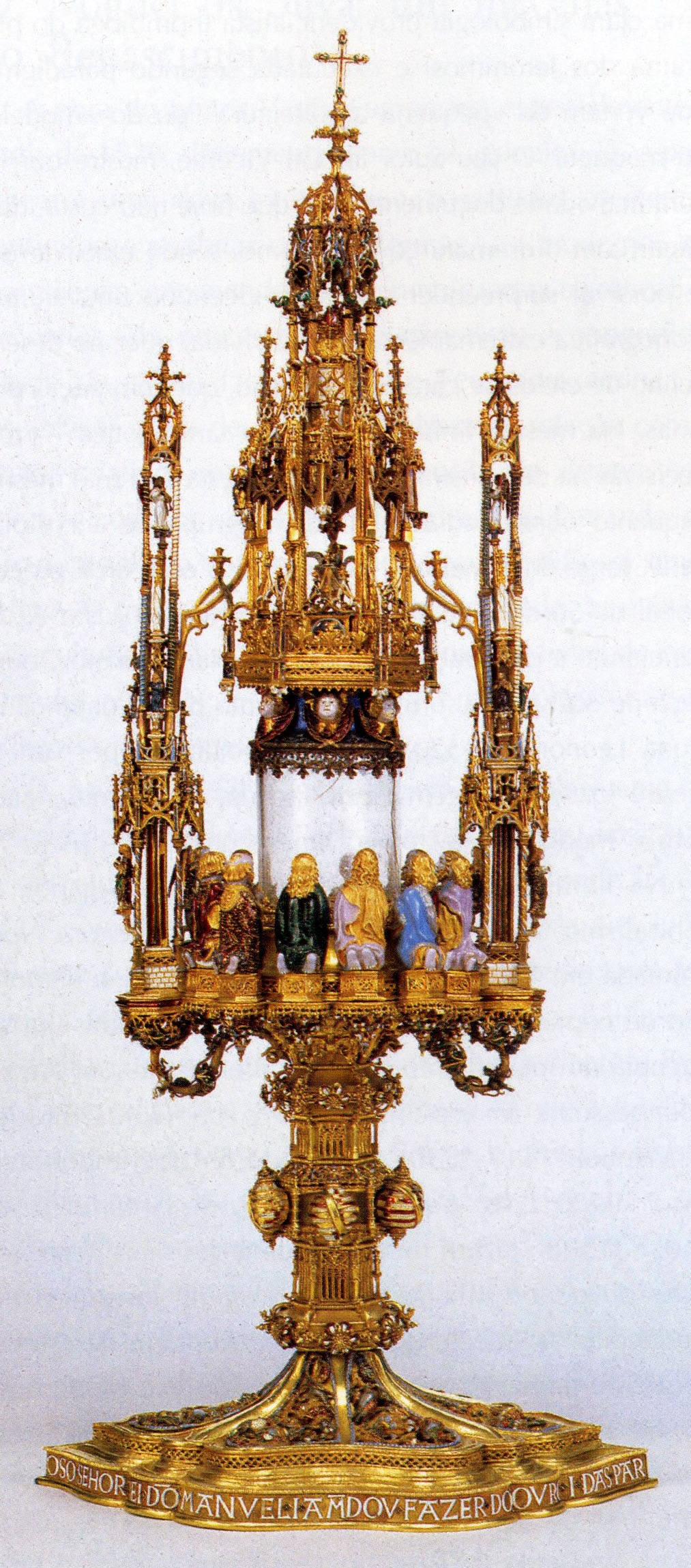
Belém Monstrance; gold and enamel monstrance made in 1506 by Gil Vicente, and offered by king Dom Manuel I of Portugal to the Jerónimos Monastery. Nowadays in the National Museum of Ancient Art, Portugal.

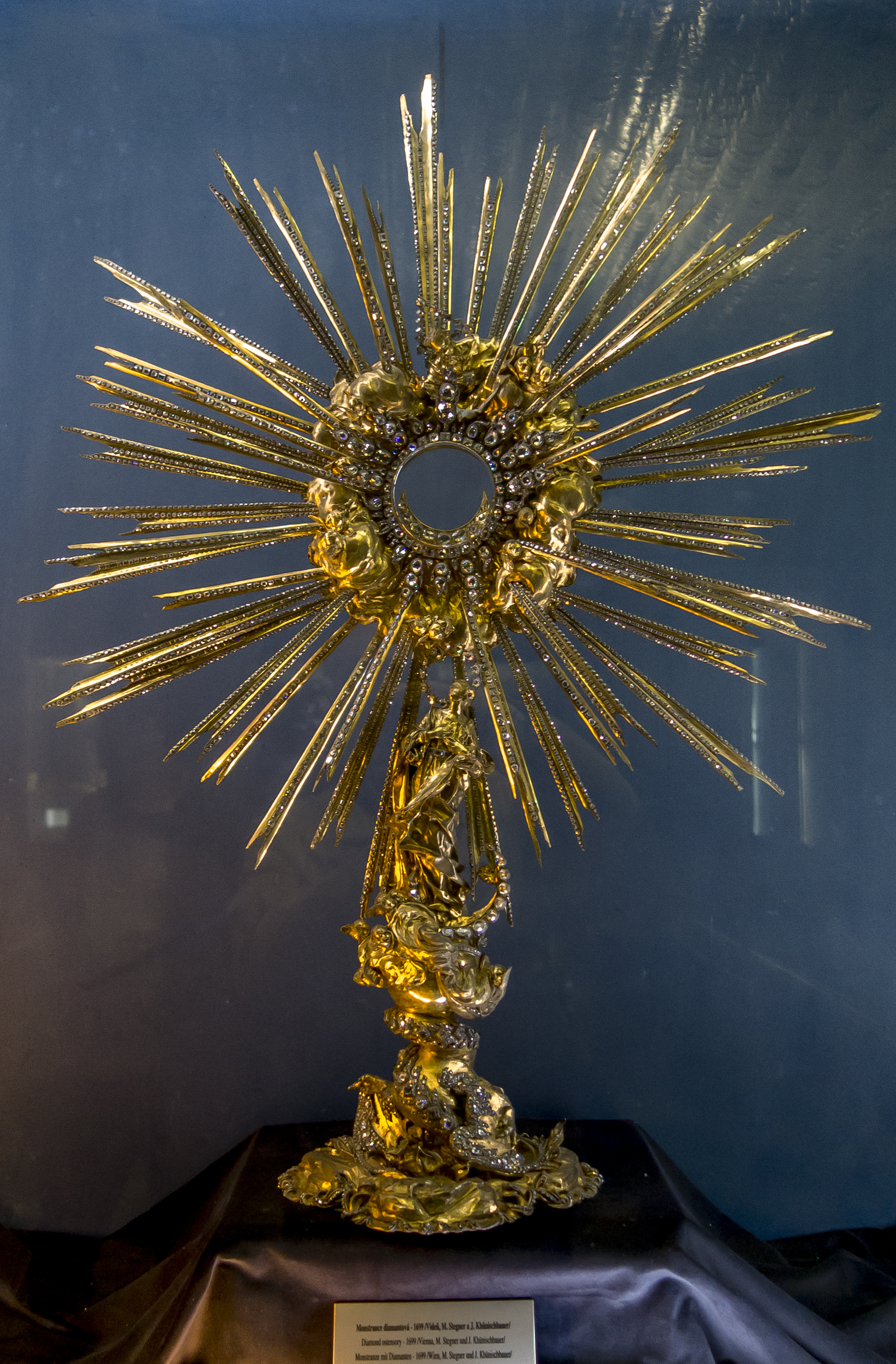
The Diamond Monstrance, made between 1696–99 in the Viennese workshops of J. B. Khünischbauer and M. Stegner. The 6,222 diamonds decorating this treasure were from the bequest of Countess Ludmila Eva Frances Kolowrat Loreta (Prague).

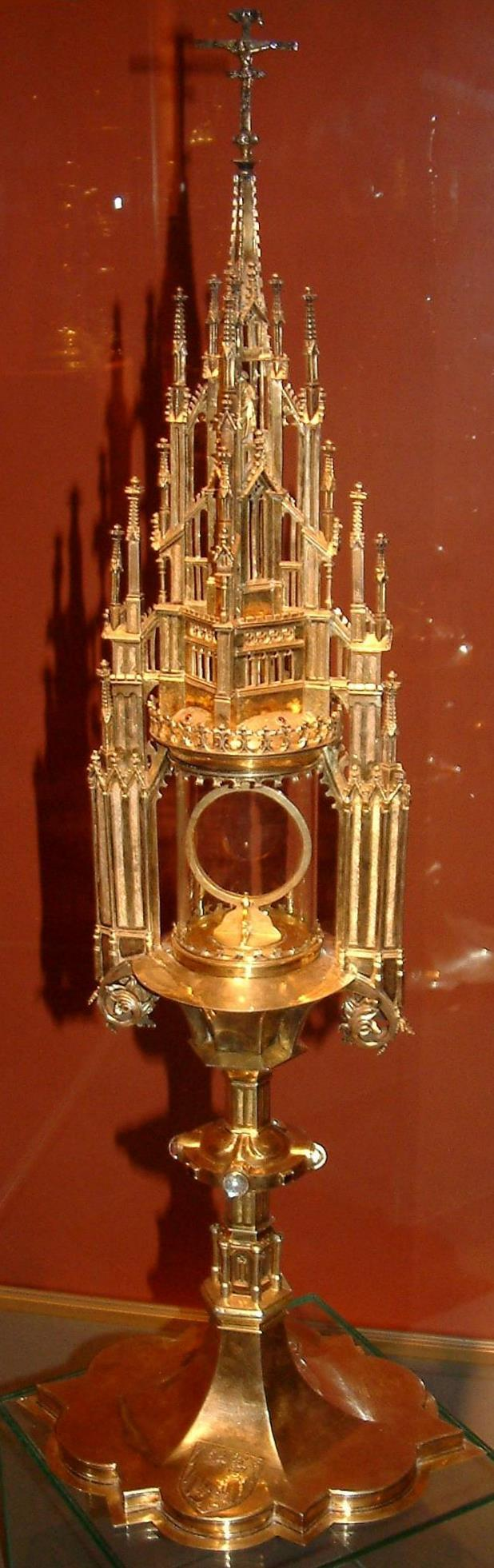
Ca. 1400. Gift of Władysław Jagiełło to the Corpus Christi Church in Poznań, Poland.

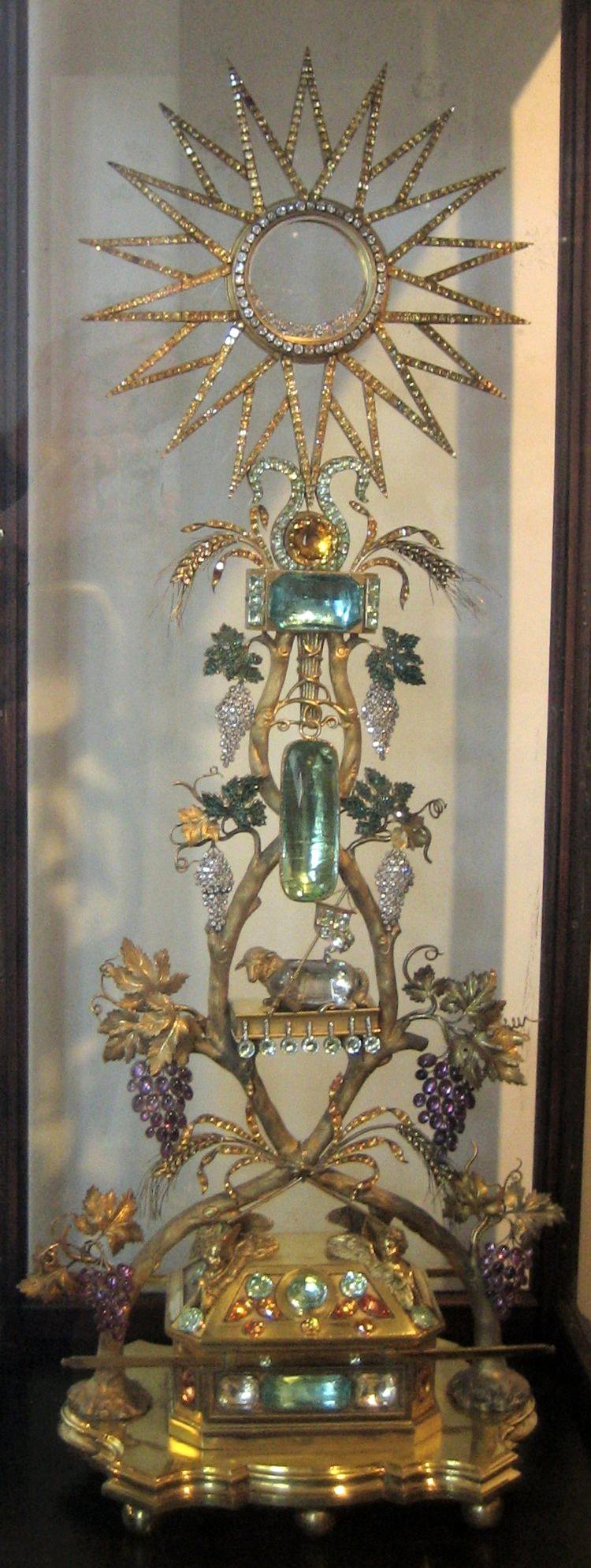
Late 18th to early 19th century 1,30 metres monstrance, Asilo de Inválidos Militares de Runa, Portugal

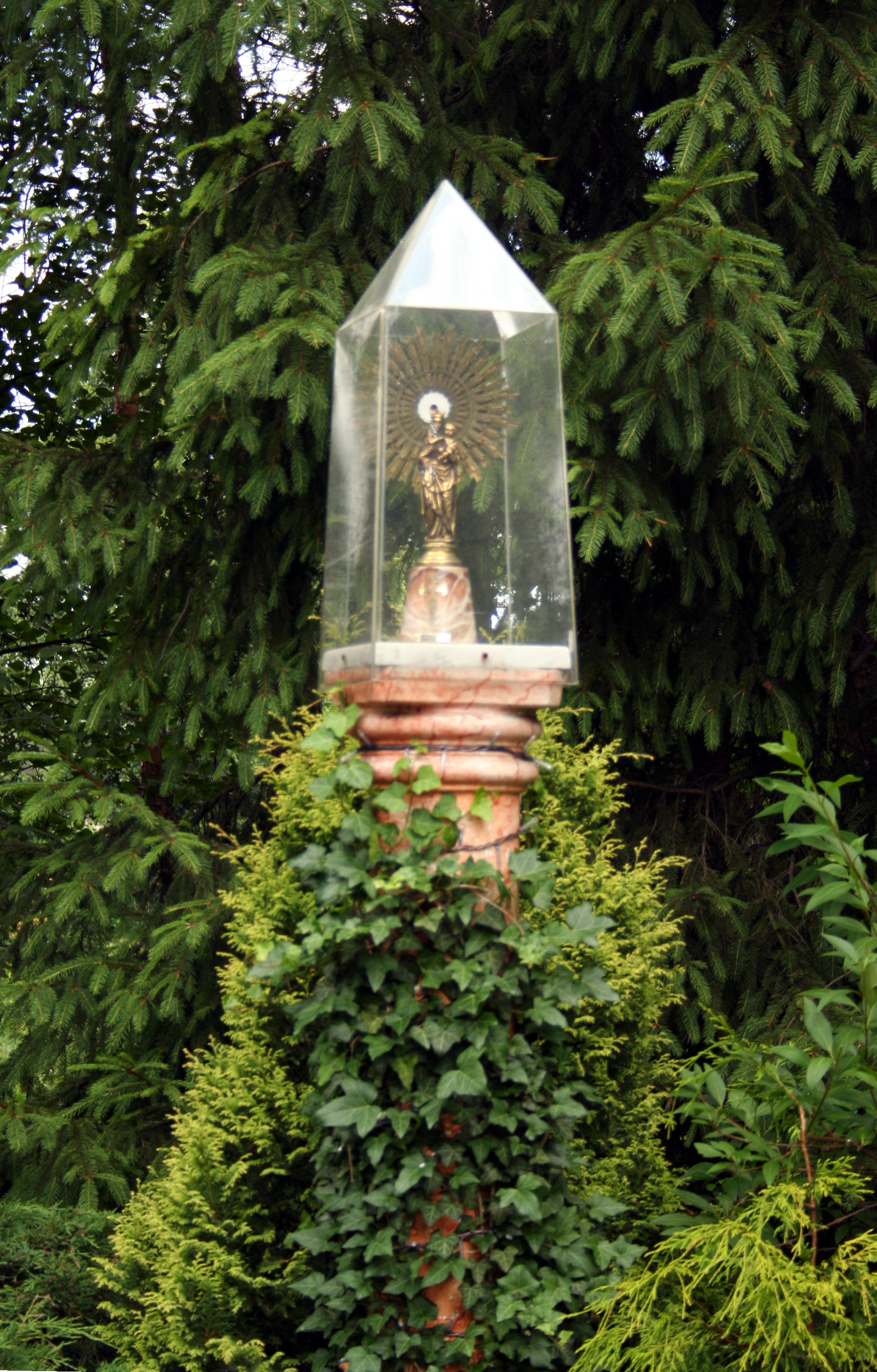
Monument with a Monstrance in Rybnik, Poland in front of the Church of St. Laurence

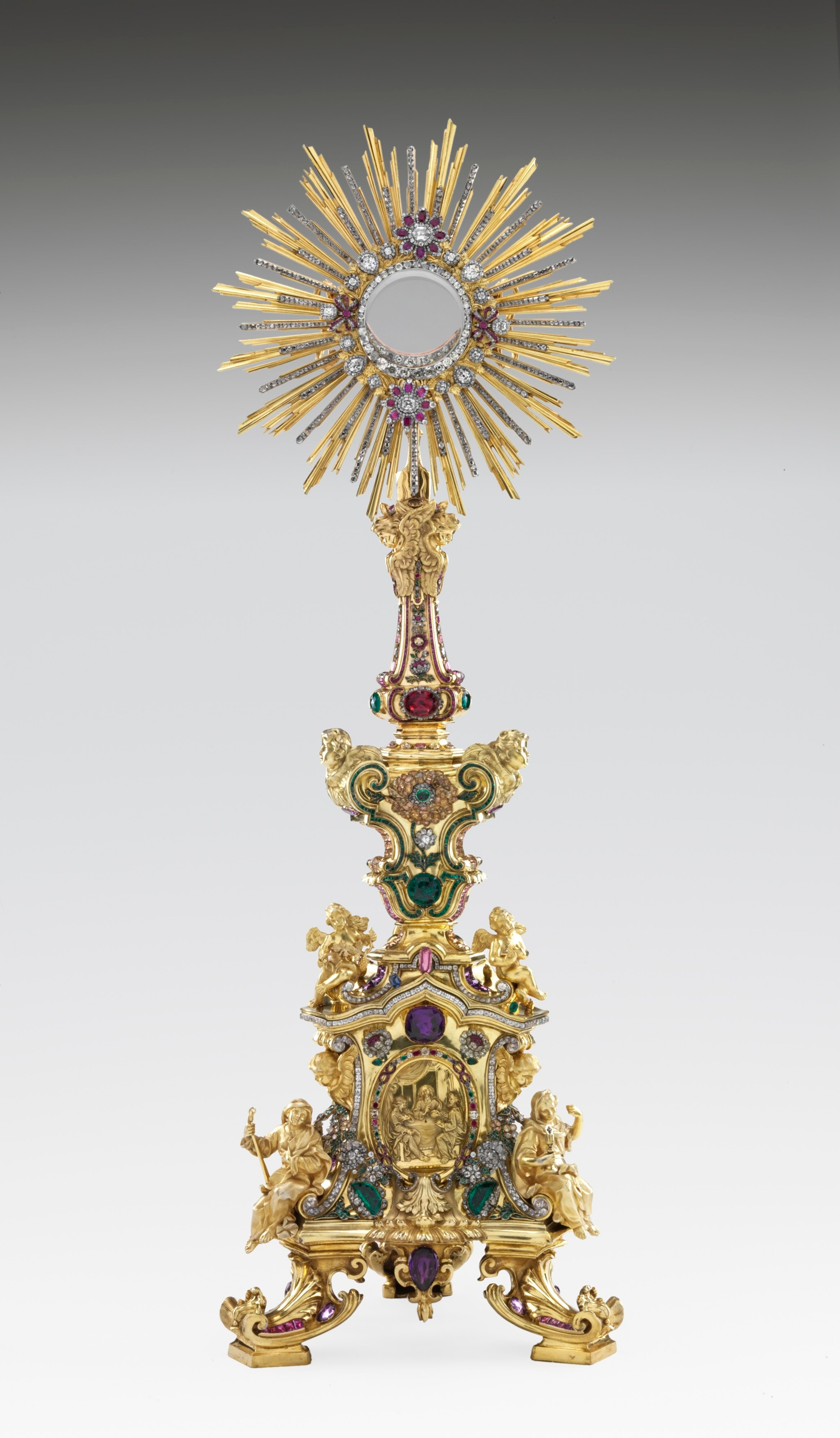
Bemposta Monstrance; 18th-century silver gilt diamonds, emeralds, rubies, etc. National Museum of Ancient Art, Portugal.

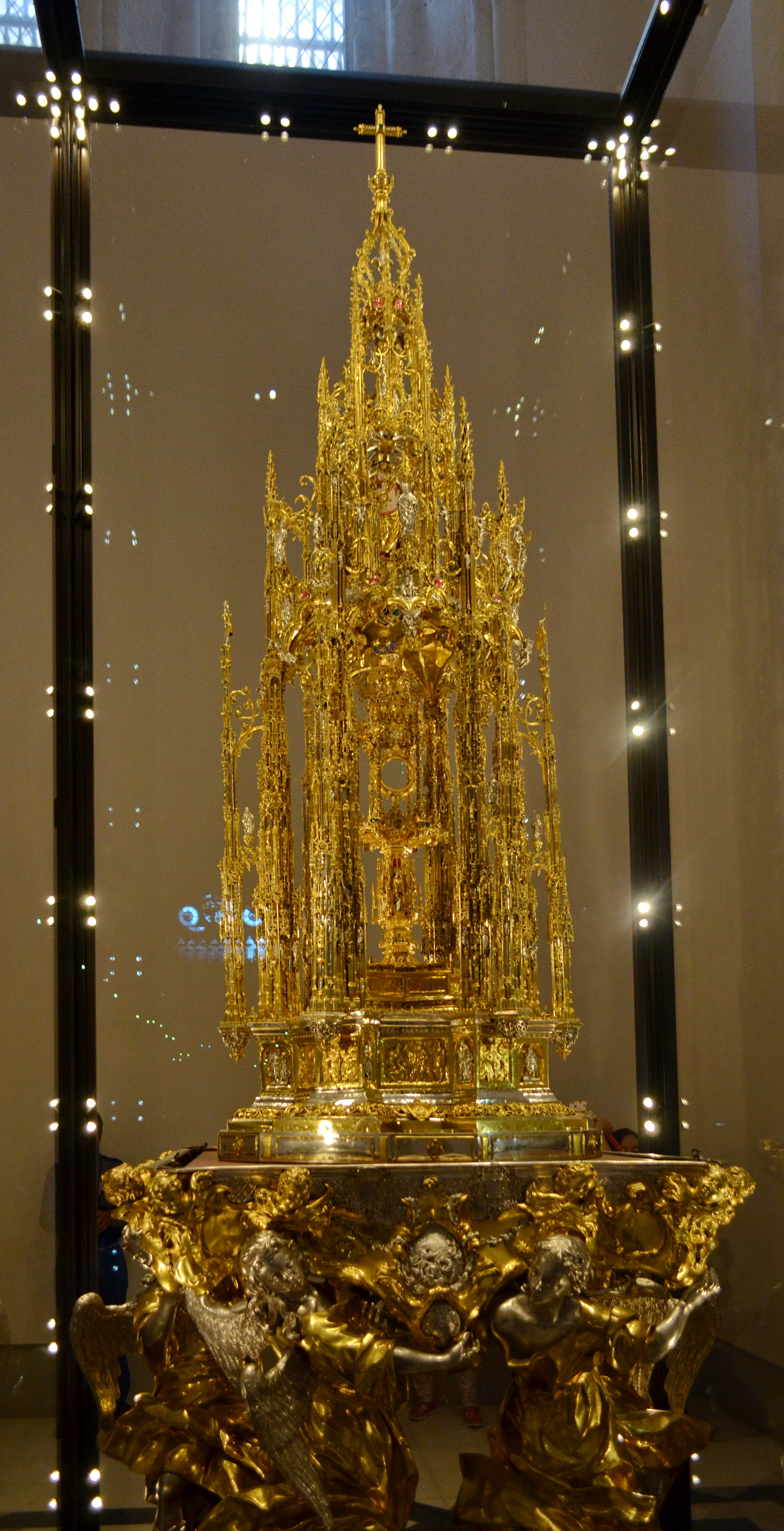
Monstrance of silver-gilt Ca. 1517 Cathedral of Toledo. Spain.

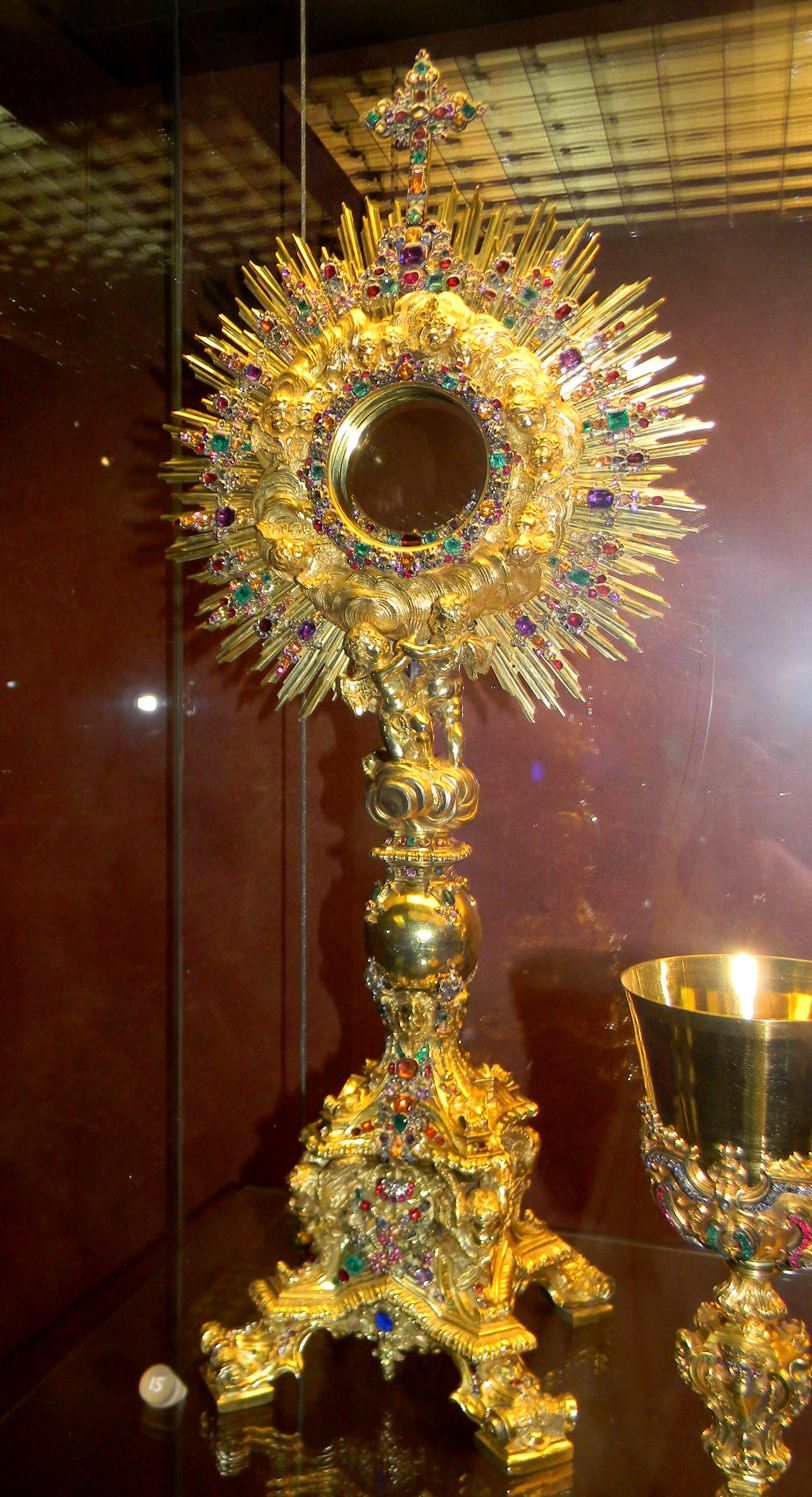
18th century Portuguese silver gilt and gems, National Museum of Ancient Art, Portugal

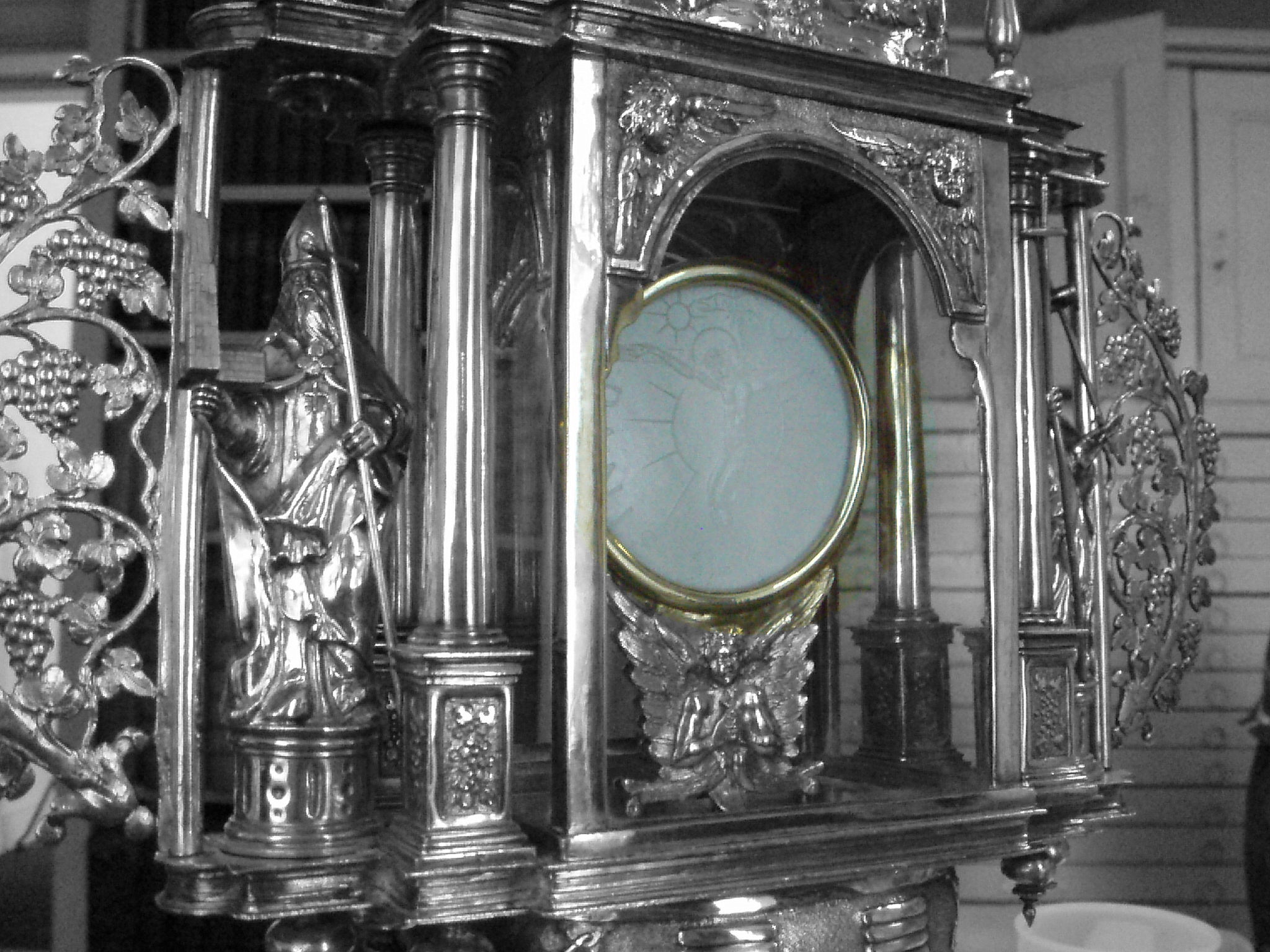
Fixed monstrance in the Old Catholic church in Oudewater, the Netherlands

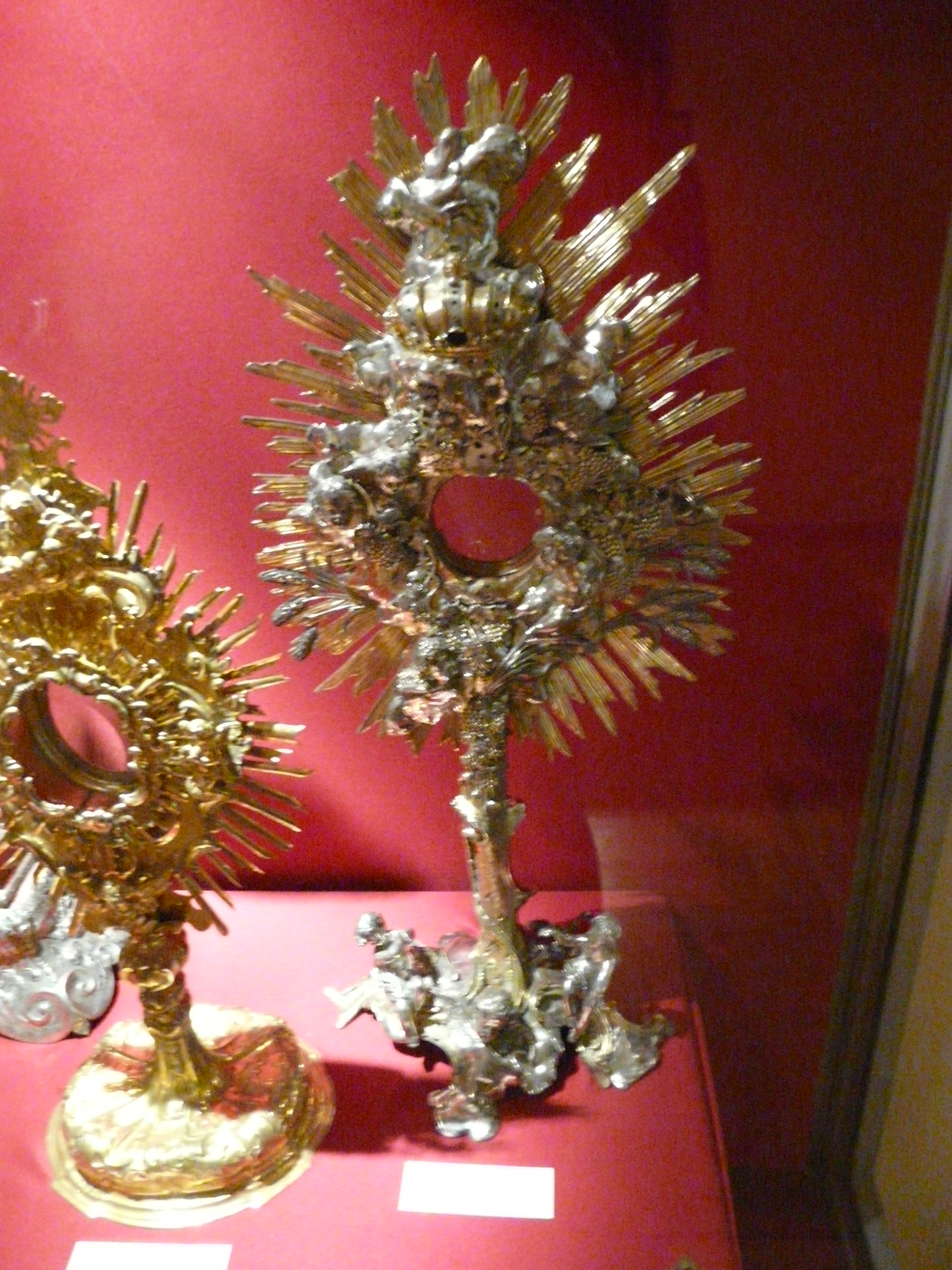
Polish Rococo monstrances

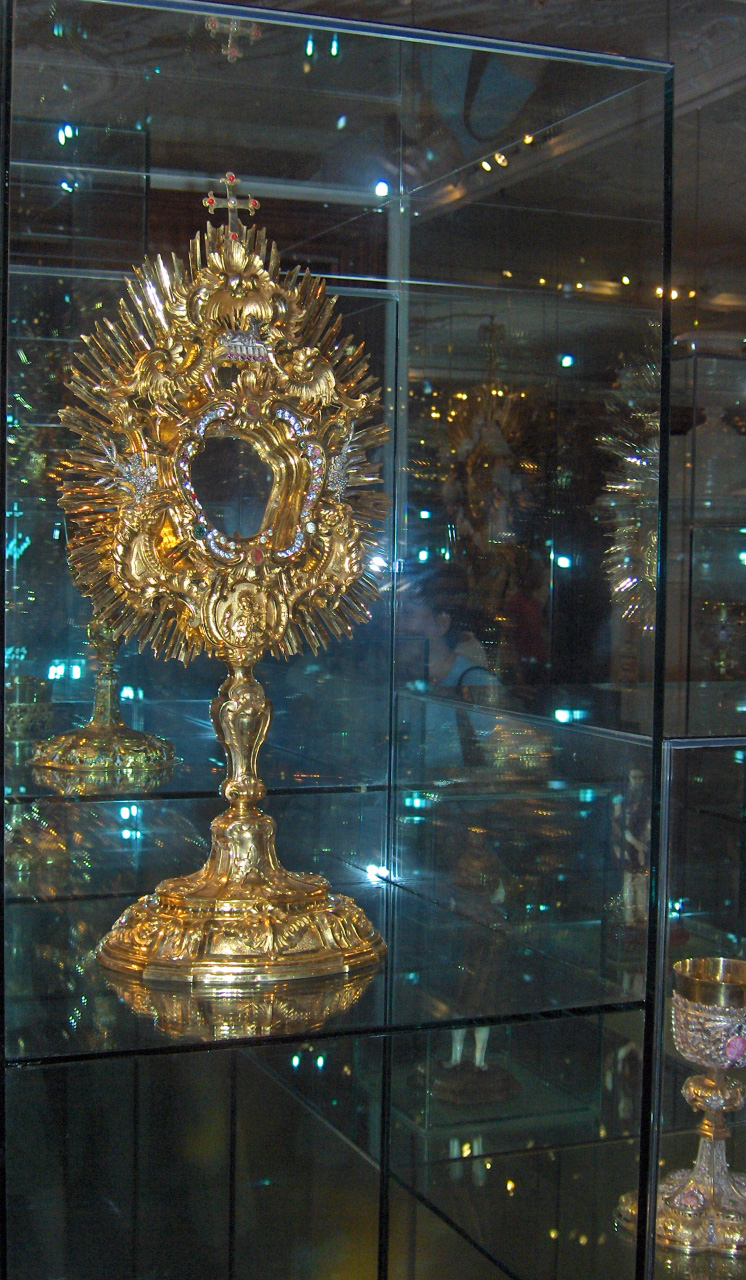
Monstrance from the museum of the Melk Abbey, Austria

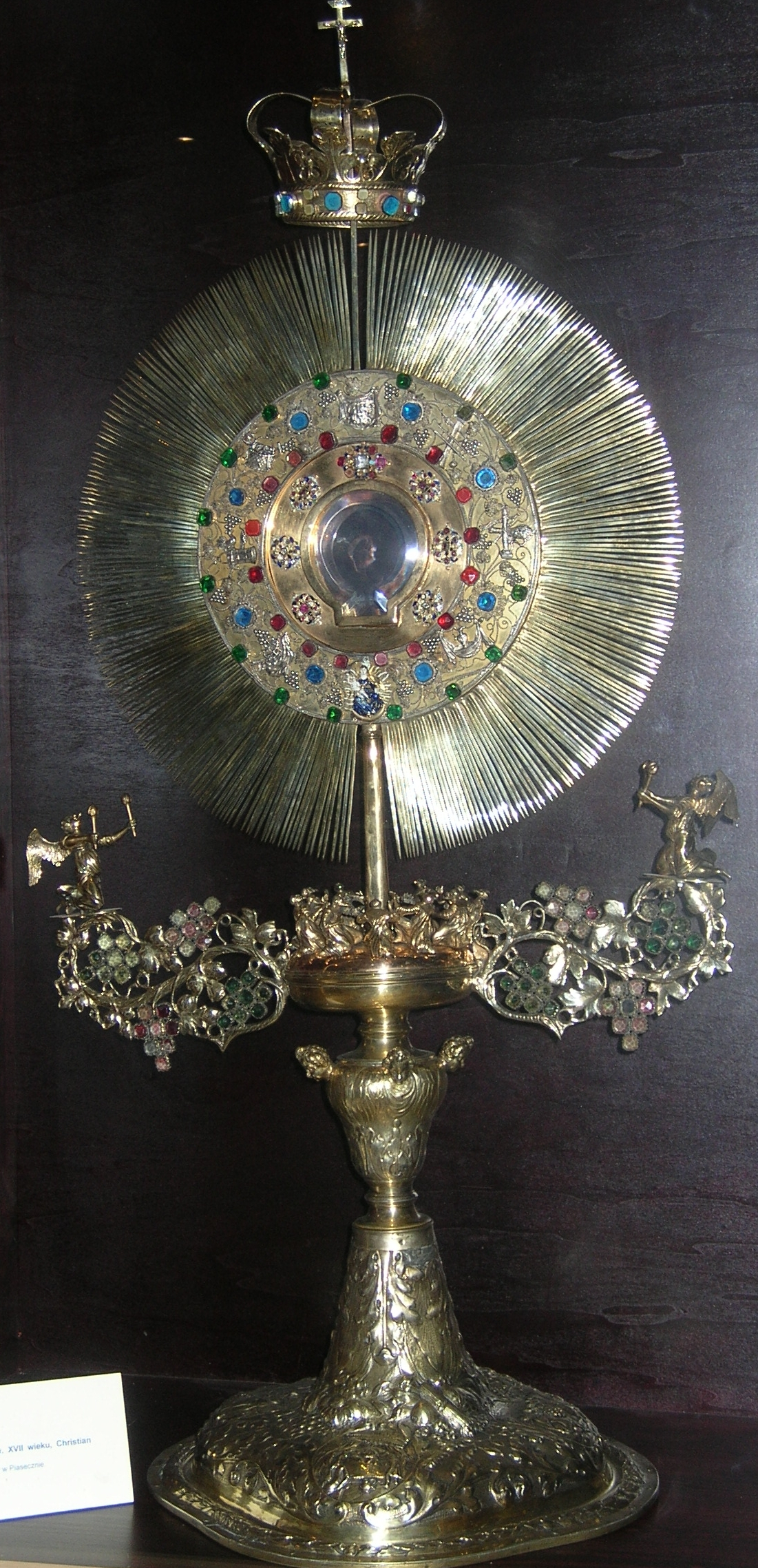
Monstrance from the museum in Pelplin, Poland

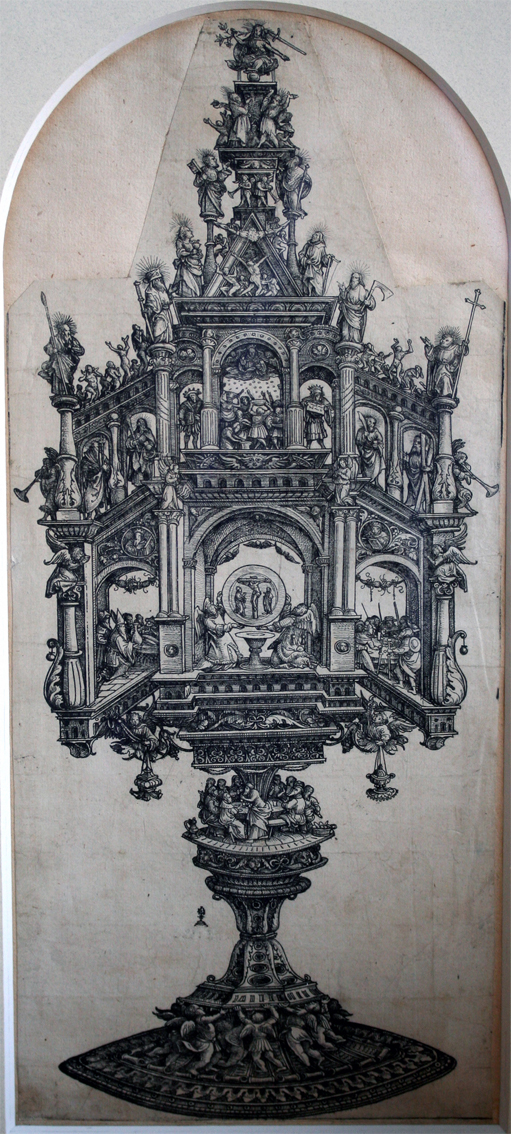
a 16th-century design for a Monstrance by Daniel Hopfer

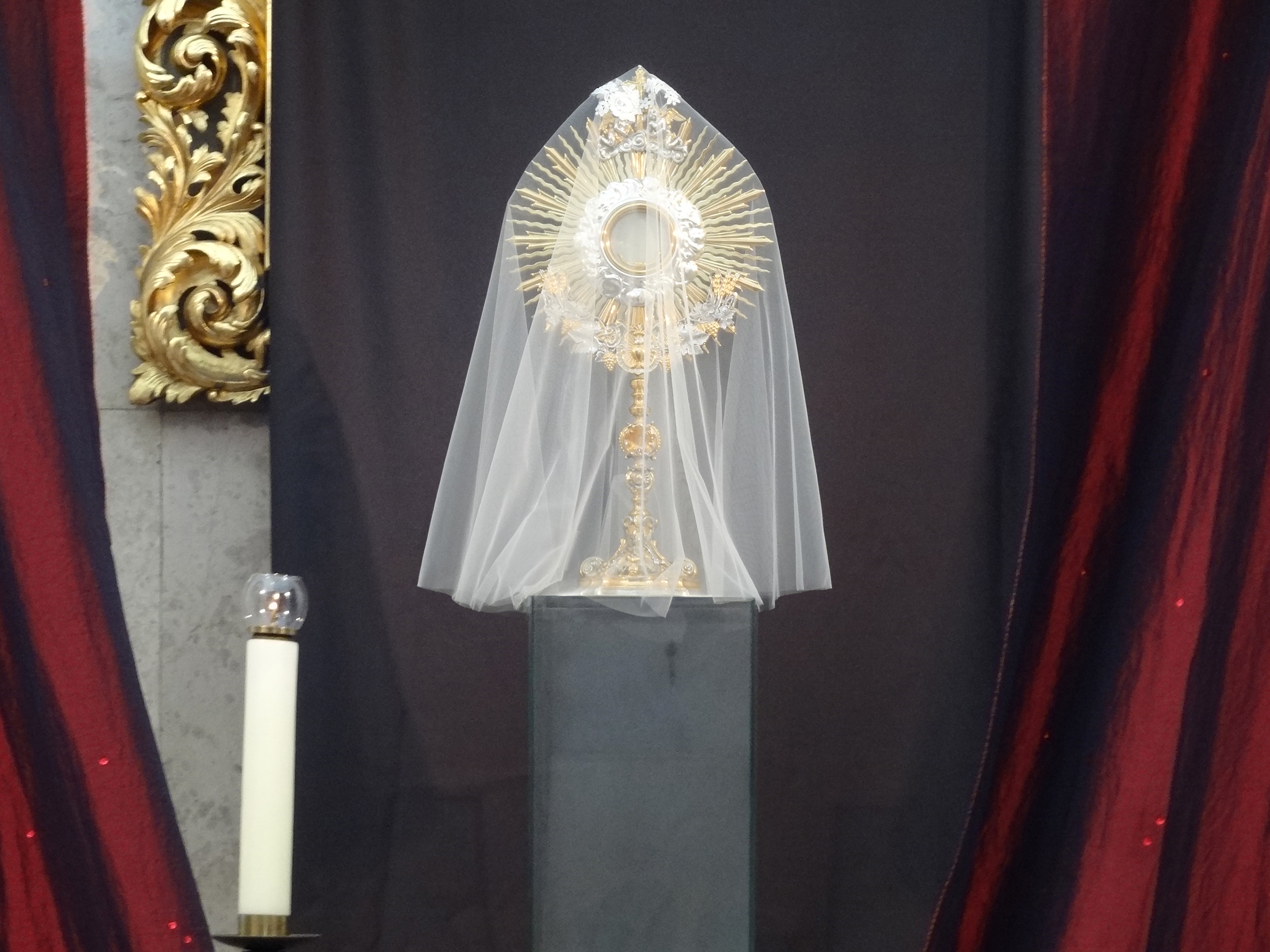
Monstrance as part of the Easter "Tomb of the Lord" scene in St. Kazimierz Church, Warsaw, Poland

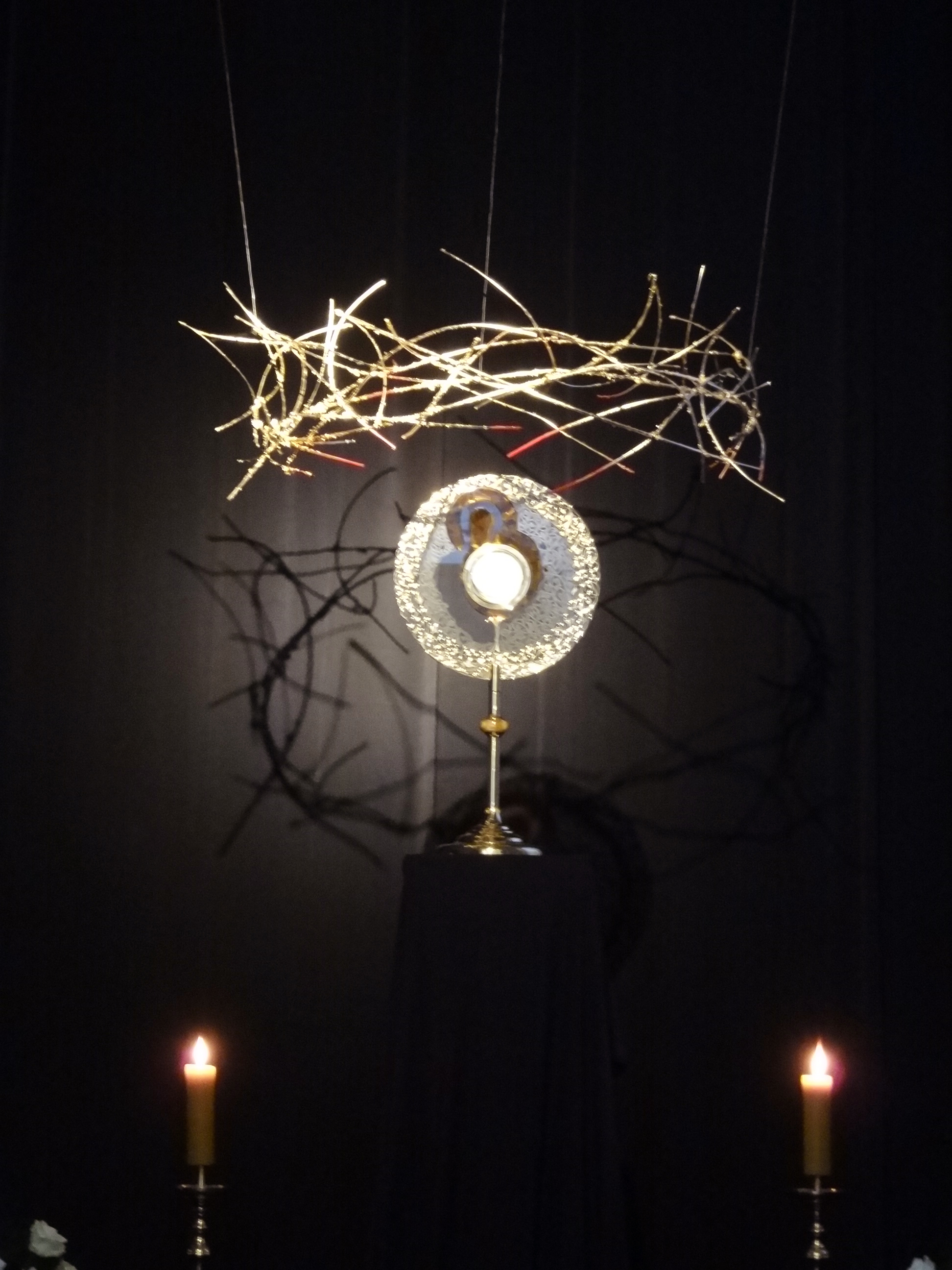
Monstrance as part of a postmodern Easter "Tomb of the Lord" scene in a church in Warsaw, Poland

=== As reliquaries ===
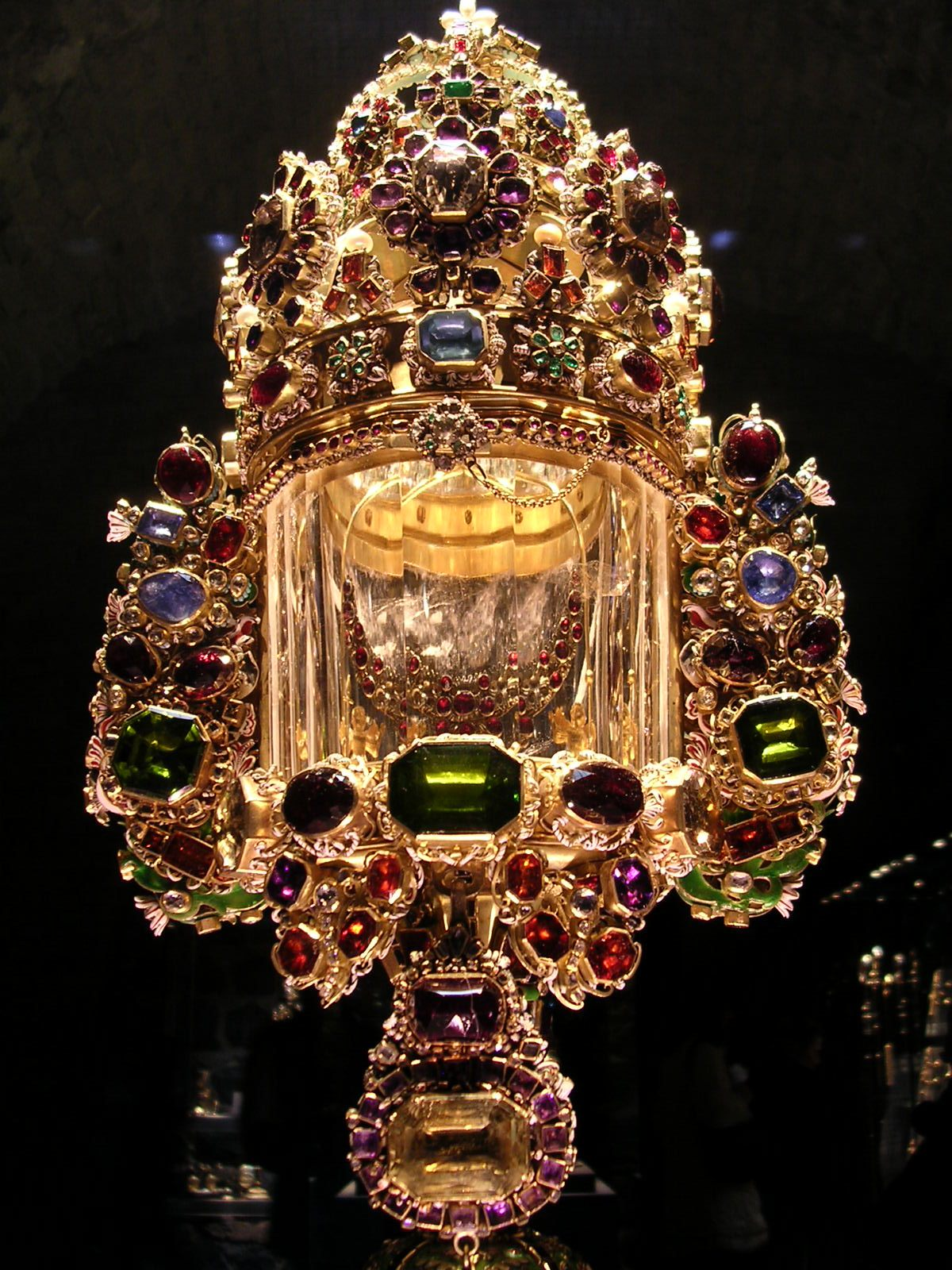
Reliquary monstrance. Cathedral Treasury, Cologne, Germany

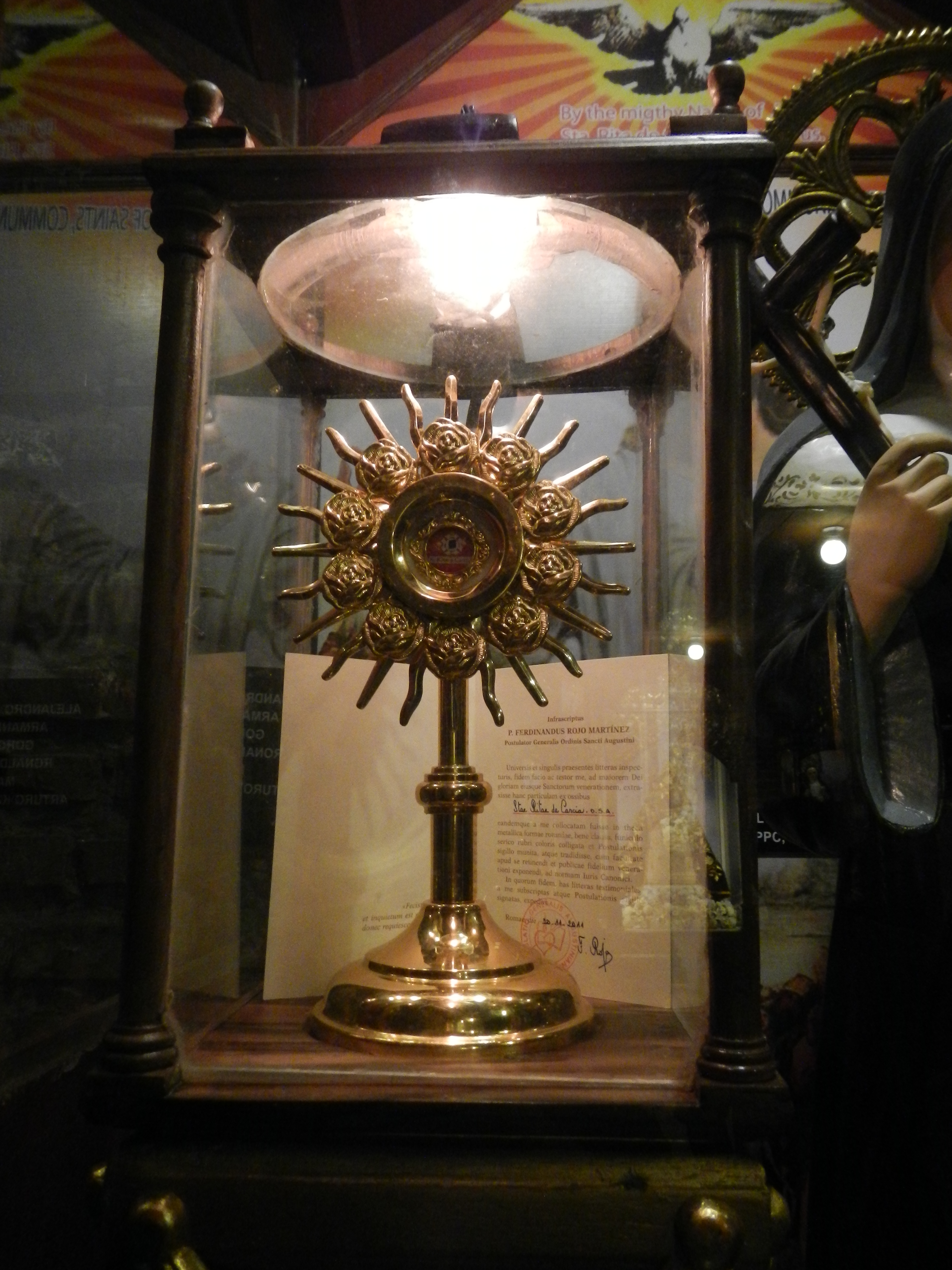
Monstrance with a relic of Saint Rita of Cascia at the Minalin Church in Pampanga, Philippines

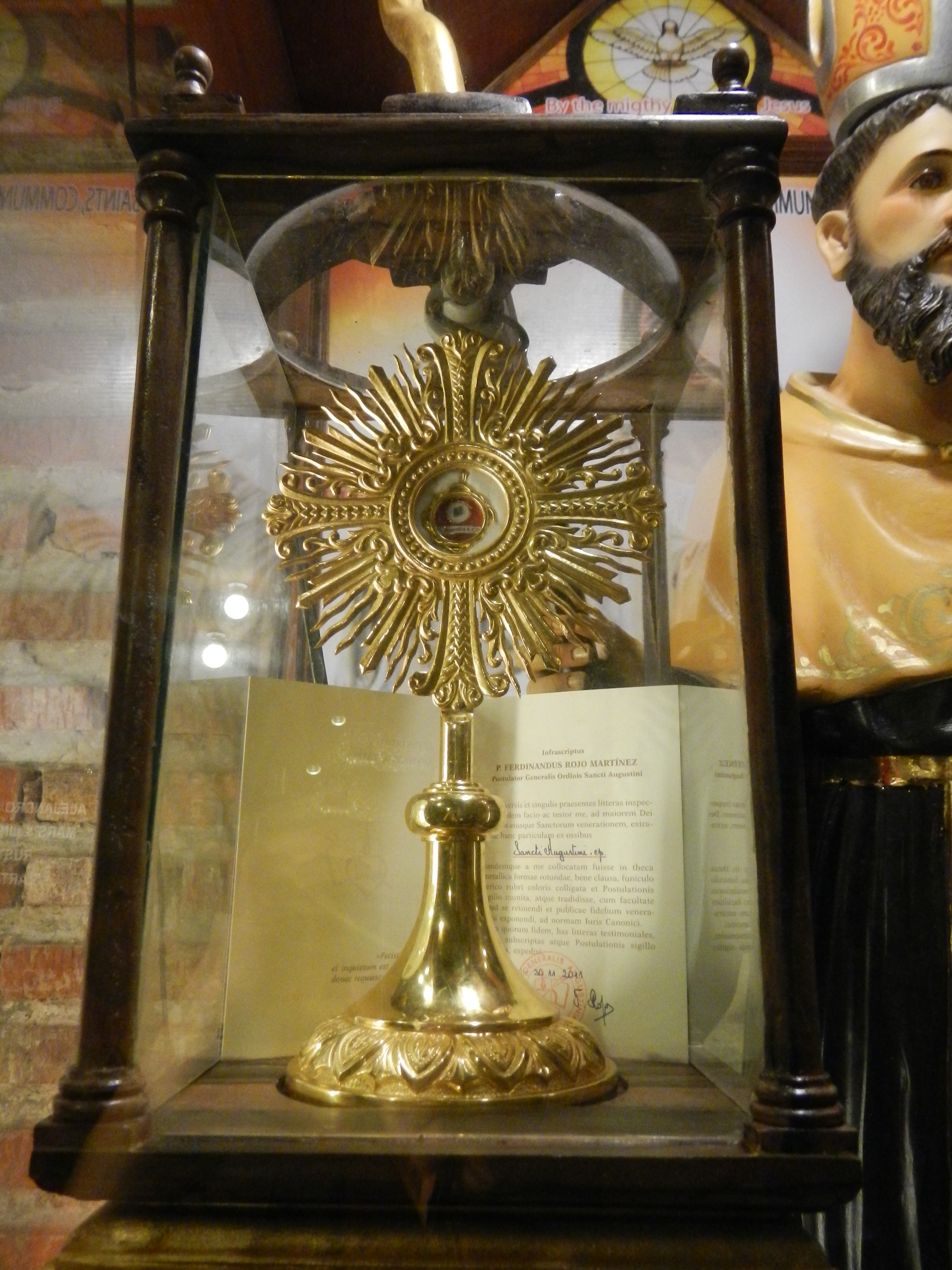
A relic of Saint Augustine at the Minalin Church in Pampanga, Philippines

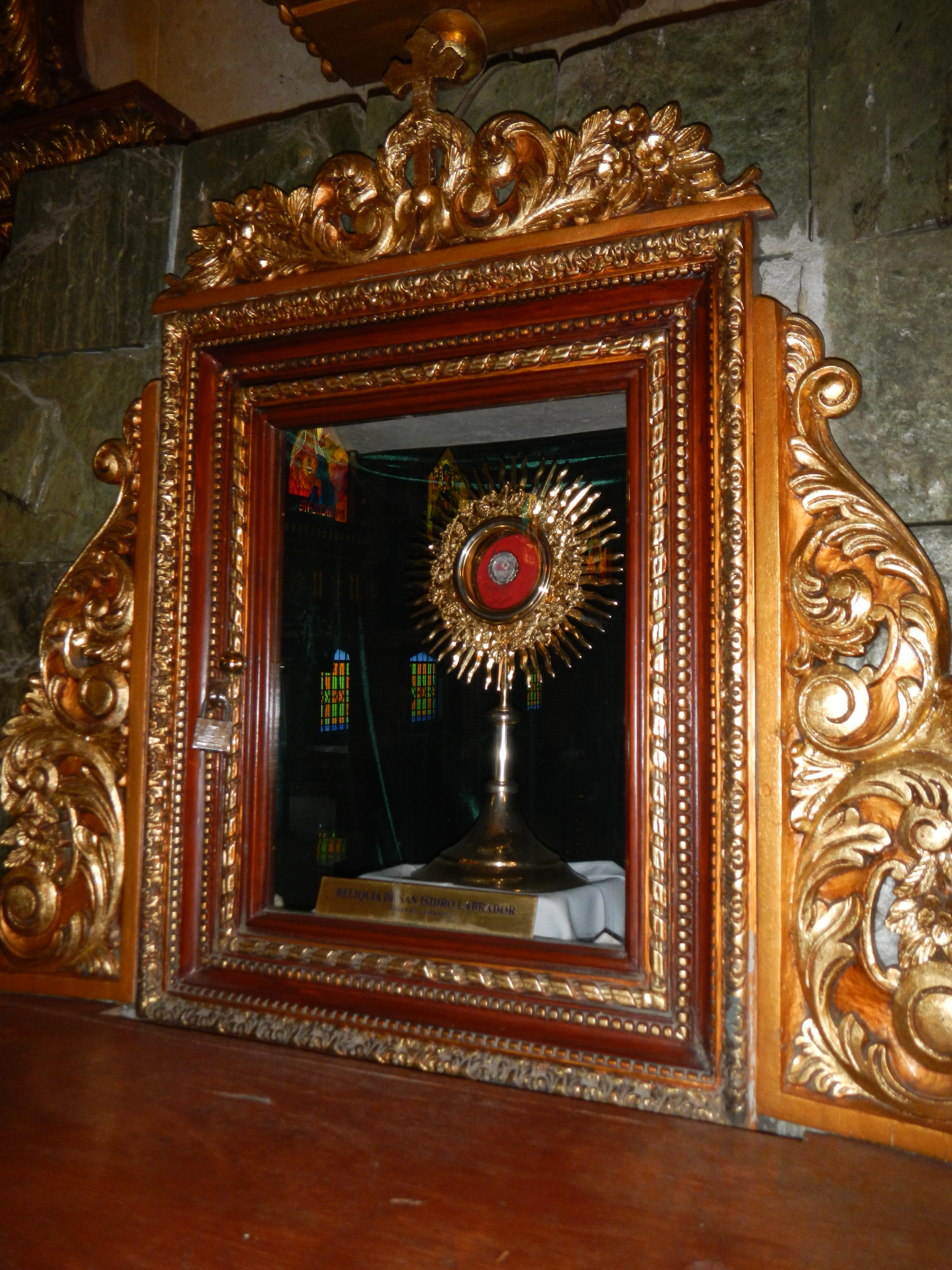
Saint Isidore the Laborer relic at the St. Isidore Church in Talavera, Nueva Ecija, Philippines

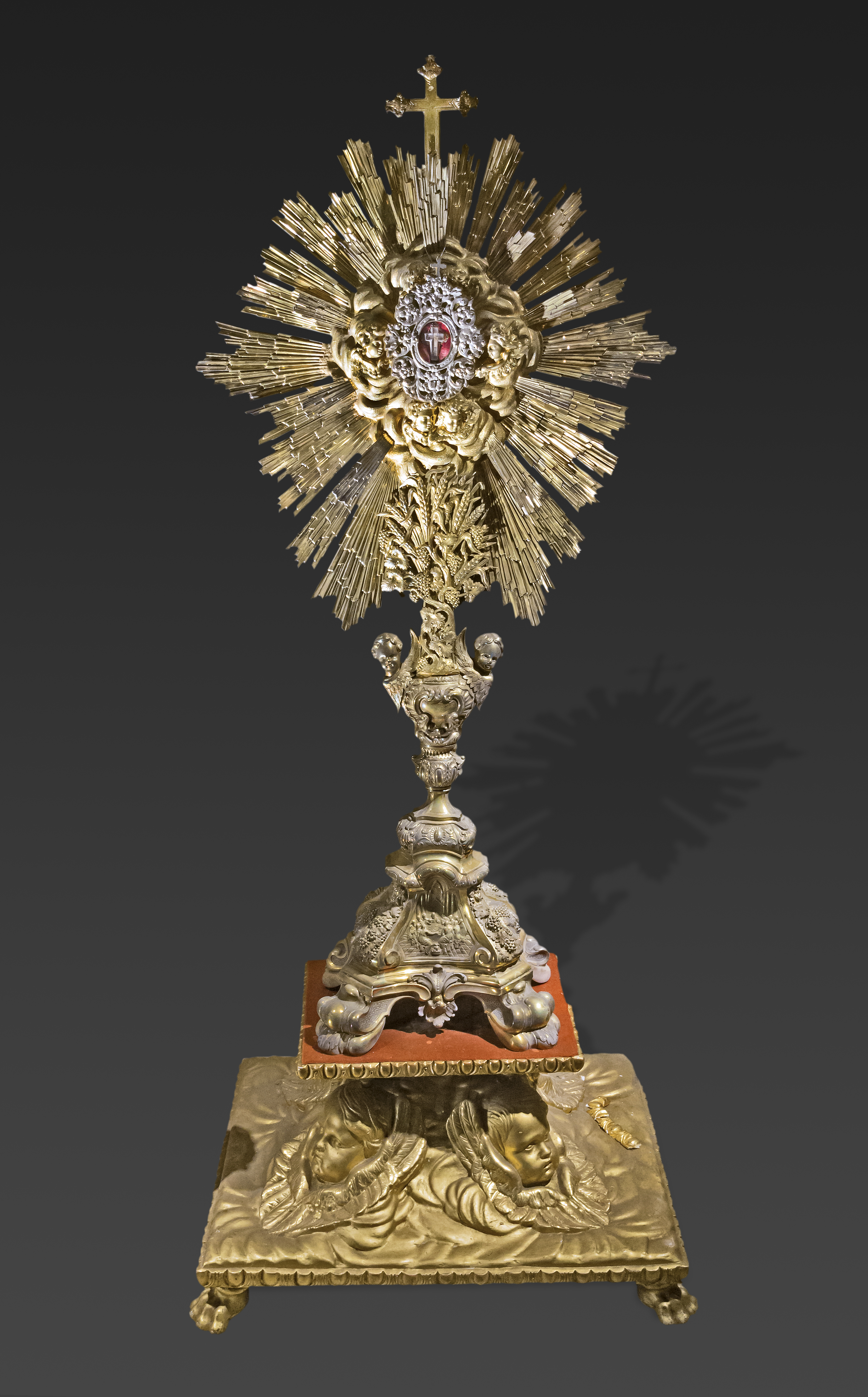
Reliquary monstrance, True Cross, Toulouse

== See also ==
- Eucharist
- Eucharistic adoration
- Monstrance clock
- Showbread
- Transubstantiation
