= Four Tantum ergo, WAB 41 =

Hymn settings

Four Tantum ergo
- Motets by Anton Bruckner
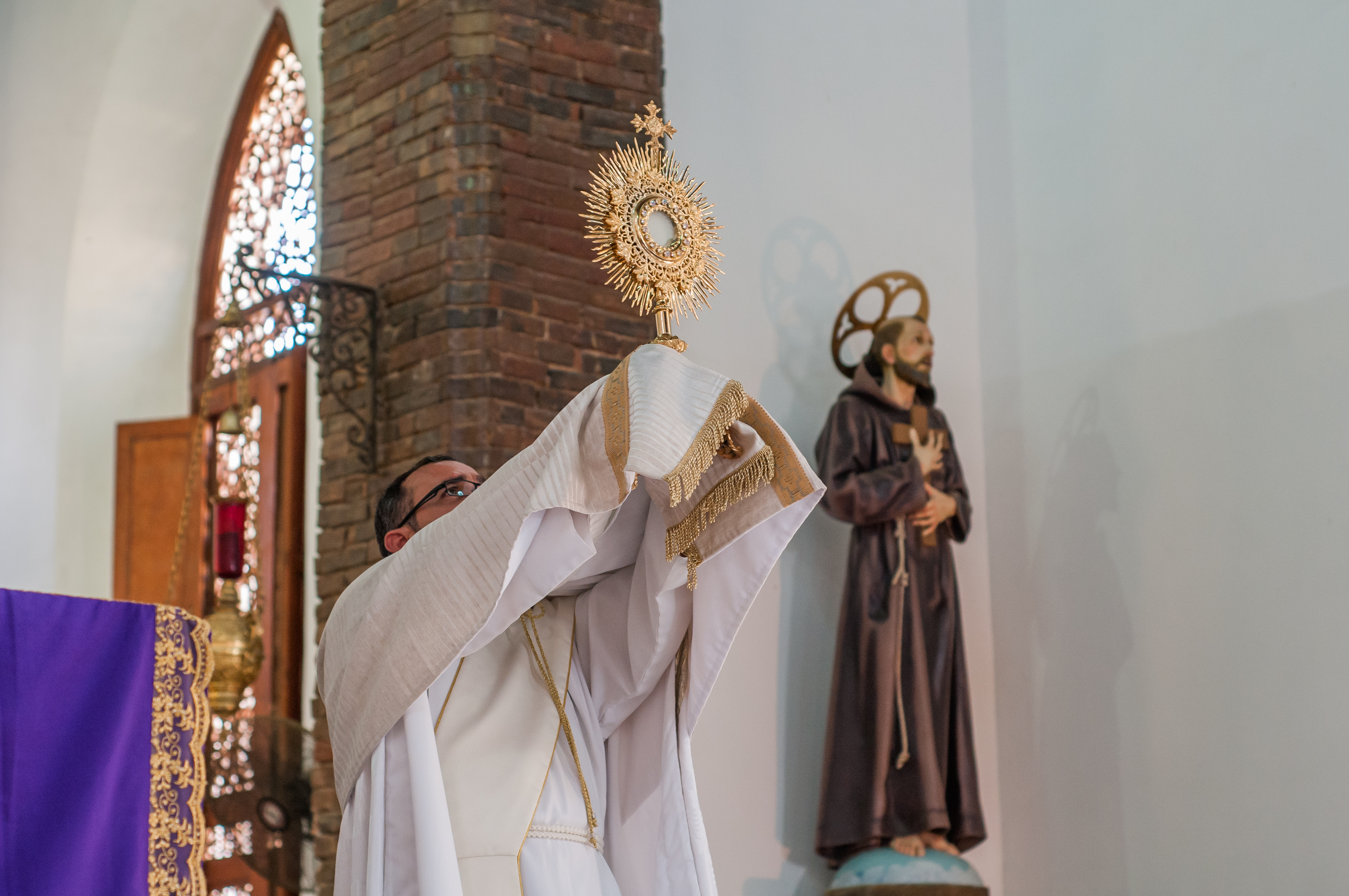
- Benediction of the Blessed Sacrament
- Key: B♭ major, A♭ major, E♭ major, C major
- Catalogue: WAB 41
- Form: Hymn
- Text: Tantum ergo
- Language: Latin
- Composed: 1846: St. Florian Abbey
- Dedication: A.M.D.G.
- Published: 1893: Innsbruck
- Vocal: SATB choir
- Instrumental: Organ ad lib. (1846 version) a cappella (1888 version)

The four Tantum ergo ("Let us raise"), WAB 41, are settings of the hymn Tantum ergo composed by Anton Bruckner in 1846.

== History ==
Bruckner composed these four motets A.M.D.G. in 1846 at the beginning of his stay at St. Florian Abbey. The original manuscript, which was stored in the archive of Neuer Dom of Linz, was lost in the process. Voice scores can still be found in the archive of the St. Florian Abbey.

In 1888, Bruckner revised these four settings, as well as the next setting in D major. The revised version of the five Tantum ergo was published first by Johann Groß, Innsbruck in 1893. In this first edition the ordering for the 4 compositions was deviating from the original ordering by the composer. The WAB ordering, which is based on this first edition, deviates also from the original ordering by the composer.

The 1846 and 1888 versions are put in Band XXI/12 and 37 of the Gesamtausgabe respectively.

== Music ==
The works are scored for SATB choir and organ ad lib. The first setting, in B♭ major (WAB 41.3) is 25-bar long. The three other settings in A♭ major (WAB 41.4), E♭ major (WAB 41.1), and C major (WAB 41.2), are 24-bar long. Afterwards a 2- (3-)bar Amen was added to the settings.

In the 1888 version the settings are score for mixed choir a cappella. In the setting in E♭ major the Dresdner Amen is used on "ritui" (bars 15-16).

== Selected discography ==
The first recording occurred in 1931:

- Ferdinand Habel, Domchor zu St. Stephan (Vienna) – 78 rpm Christschall 130A (Tantum ergo in C major, 1846 version)

=== 1846 version ===
There is a single recording with all four Tantum ergo:

- Thomas Kerbl, Chorvereinigung Bruckner 09, Anton Bruckner Chöre/Klaviermusik – CD: LIVA 034 (first strophe only)

=== 1888 version ===
There are four recordings with all four Tantum ergo:

- Magnar Mangersnes, Domchor Bergen, Bruckner: Motets – CD: Simax PSC 9037, 1996
- Petr Fiala, Tschechischer Philharmonischer Chor Brno, Anton Bruckner: Motets - CD: MDG 322 1422-2, 2006
- Erwin Ortner, Arnold Schoenberg Chor, Anton Bruckner: Tantum ergo - CD: ASC Edition 3, issue of the choir, 2008
- Sigvards Klava, Latvian Radio Choir, Bruckner: Latin Motets, 2019 – CD Ondine OD 1362

== Sources ==
- Max Auer, Anton Bruckner als Kirchenmusiker, G. Bosse, Regensburg, 1927
- Anton Bruckner – Sämtliche Werke, Band XXI: Kleine Kirchenmusikwerke, Musikwissenschaftlicher Verlag der Internationalen Bruckner-Gesellschaft, Hans Bauernfeind and Leopold Nowak (Editor), Vienna, 1984/2001
- Cornelis van Zwol, Anton Bruckner 1824–1896 – Leven en werken, uitg. Thoth, Bussum, Netherlands, 2012. ISBN 978-90-6868-590-9
