= Ostension (Christianity) =

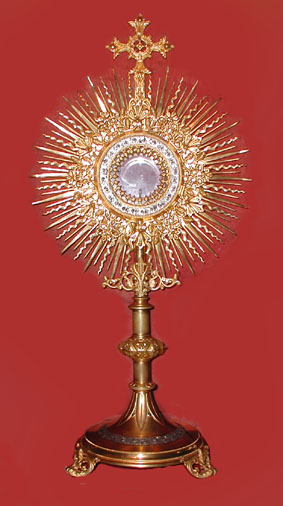
A traditional solar monstrance

In Christianity, ostension is a solemn display of sacred objects and relics for adoration.

Often a special vessel, called monstrance or ostensorium, is used for display of objects of piety on an altar or as a reliquary. The tradition of ostension of the Blessed Sacrament is traced to at least 12th century, before the introduction of special ostensoria.
