= Tantum ergo, WAB 43 =

1845 motet composed by Anton Bruckner

Tantum ergo
- Motet by Anton Bruckner
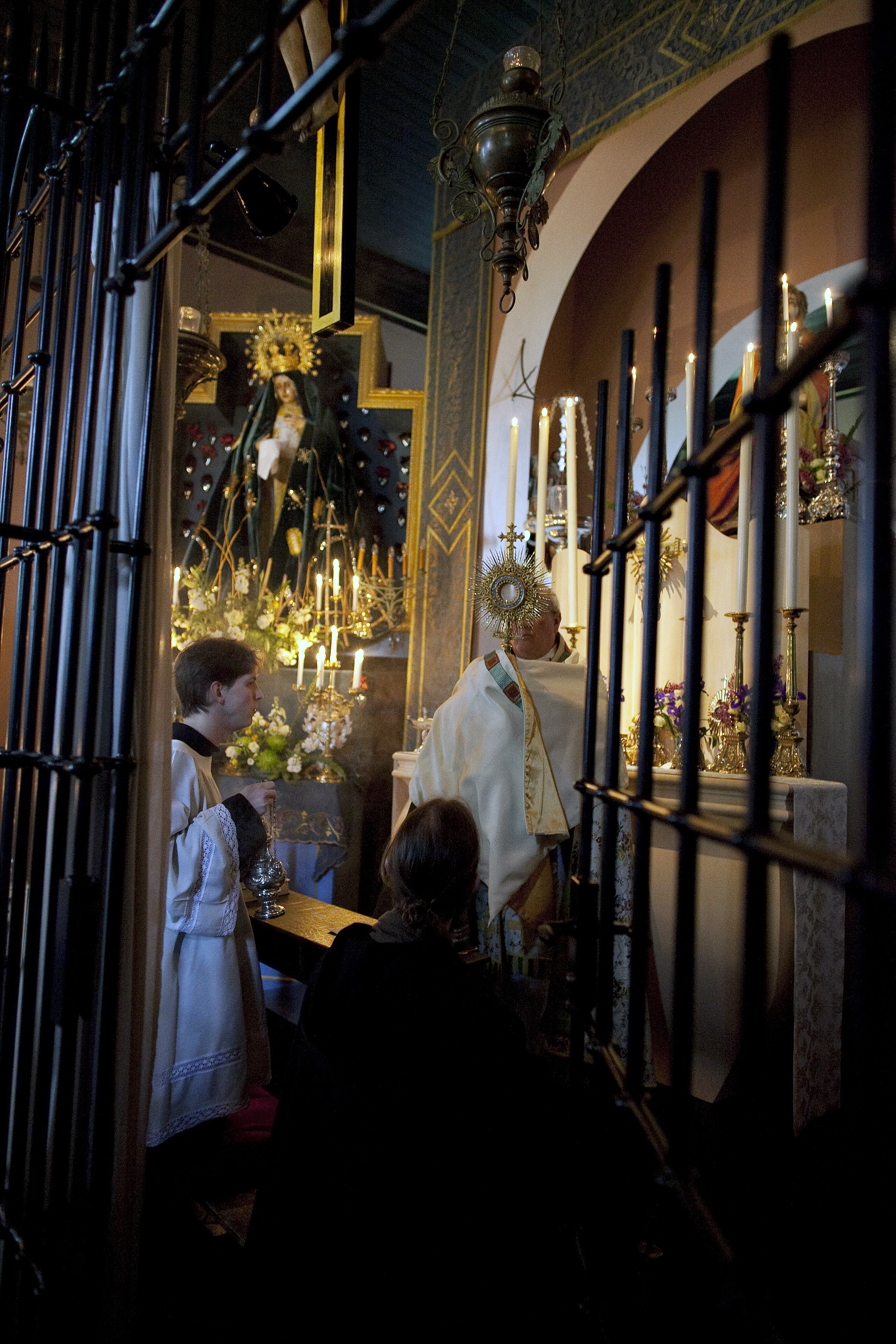
- Benediction of the Blessed Sacrament
- Key: A major
- Catalogue: WAB 43
- Form: Hymn
- Text: Tantum ergo
- Language: Latin
- Composed: c. 1845:
- Published: 1932: Regensburg
- Vocal: SATB choir
- Instrumental: Organ

Tantum ergo ("Let us raise"), WAB 43, is the second of eight settings of the hymn Tantum ergo composed by Anton Bruckner in c. 1845.

== History ==
Bruckner composed the motet in the fall of 1845 at the end of his stay in Kronstorf or in 1846 at the beginning of his stay in St. Florian Abbey. The original manuscript, on which the Chorale Dir, Herr, dir will ich mich ergeben is also found, is stored in the archive of the abbey. Two copies of the manuscript are also stored in the Österreichische Nationalbibliothek.

The motet was first published in band II/2, pp. 116–118 of the Göllerich/Auer biography. The full version is put in Band XXI/8 of the Gesamtausgabe.

== Music ==
The work of 36 bars in A major is scored for SATB choir and organ.

Joseph Anton Pfeiffer, the organist of Seitenstetten Abbey, to whom Bruckner gave the composition for critical analysis, found Bruckner "ein ächtes musikalisches Genie" ("a real musical genius").

== Discography ==
There are three recordings of this second setting of Tantum ergo:

- Jonathan Brown, Ealing Abbey Choir, Anton Bruckner: Sacred Motets – CD: Herald HAVPCD 213, 1997 (without organ accompaniment)
- Thomas Kerbl, Chorvereinigung Bruckner 09, Anton Bruckner Chöre/Klaviermusik – CD: LIVA 034 (first strophe only)
- Sigvards Klava, Latvian Radio Choir, Bruckner: Latin Motets, 2019 – CD Ondine OD 1362 (first strophe only)

== Sources ==
- August Göllerich, Anton Bruckner. Ein Lebens- und Schaffens-Bild, c. 1922 – posthumous edited by Max Auer by G. Bosse, Regensburg, 1932
- Anton Bruckner – Sämtliche Werke, Band XXI: Kleine Kirchenmusikwerke, Musikwissenschaftlicher Verlag der Internationalen Bruckner-Gesellschaft, Hans Bauernfeind and Leopold Nowak (Editor), Vienna, 1984/2001
- Cornelis van Zwol, Anton Bruckner 1824–1896 – Leven en werken, uitg. Thoth, Bussum, Netherlands, 2012. ISBN 978-90-6868-590-9
