= Monstrance clock =

Clock developed during the Renaissance

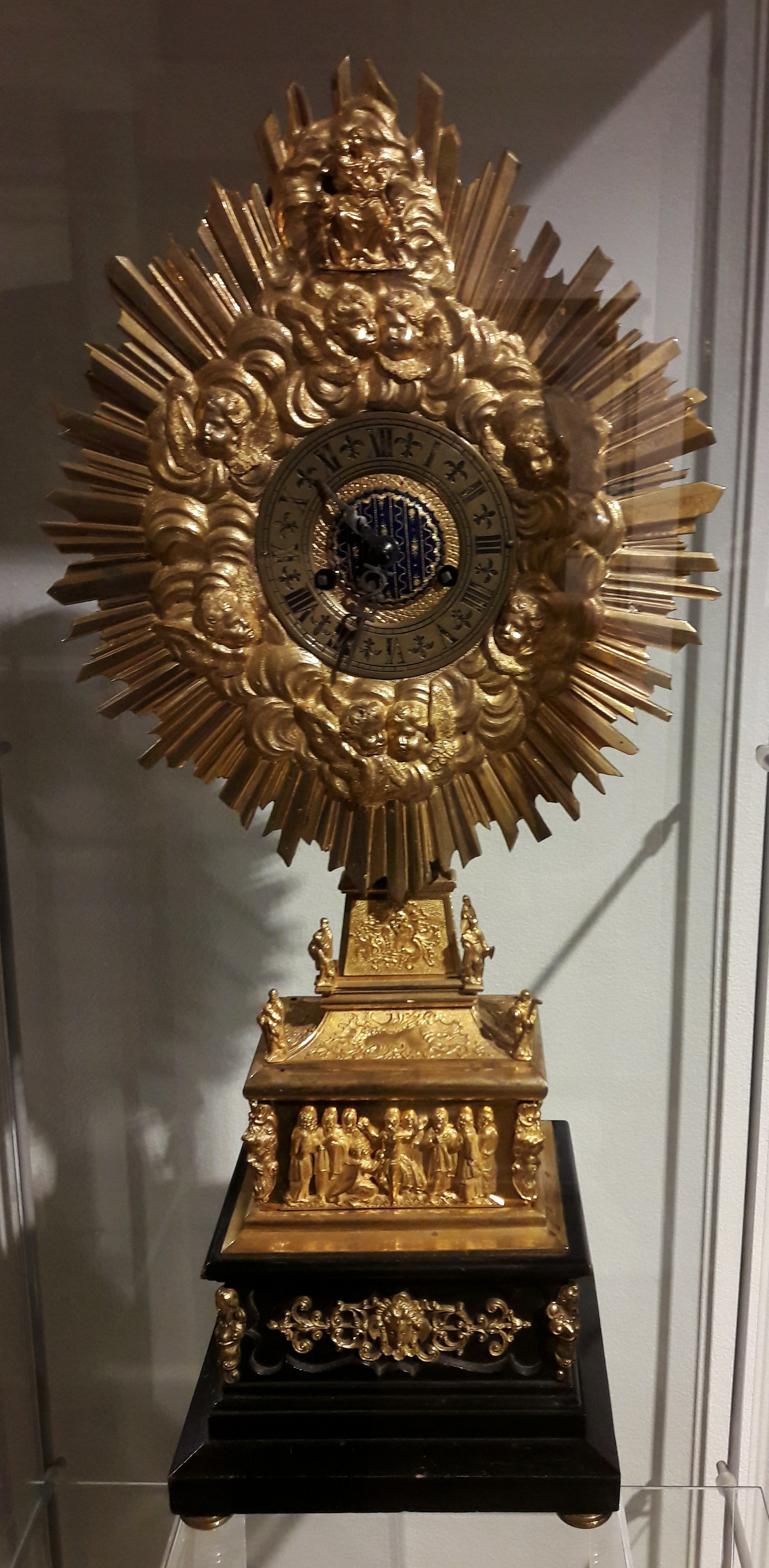
A Polish monstrance clock

The monstrance clock, or mirror clock, is a type of clock that was developed during the Renaissance (1300–1600 AD). It is cross-shaped and typically either gold or silver in colour but can be both. They used to play an important part in church ritual and often incorporated sacred figures as part of the design. Such clocks often used a rotating ball at its top or base to indicate the time of day. Monstrance clocks and crucifix clocks remained fashionable until the eighteenth century.
