= Bemposta Monstrance =

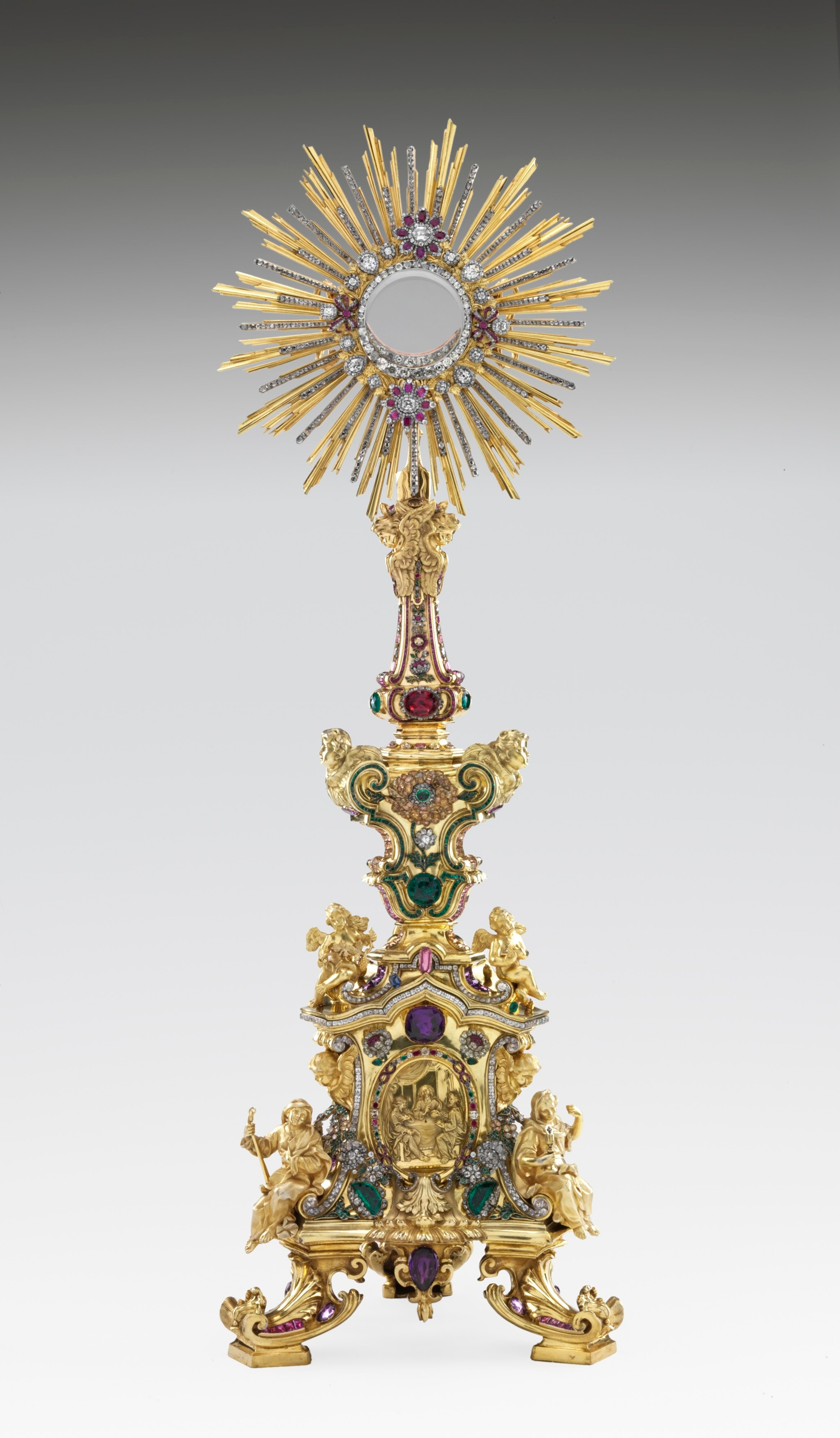
The Bemposta Monstrance

The Bemposta Monstrance (Portuguese: Custódia da Bemposta) is a monstrance dated 1777, designed by architect Mateus Vicente de Oliveira and made by Prussian-born jewelsmith Adam Gottlieb Pollet. It was commissioned by Peter III of Portugal for the Chapel of Bemposta Palace, an estate in the Infante's dominions as Lord of the House of the Infantado.

It is one of the finest examples of Portuguese Baroque goldsmithing. It is currently part of the collection of the National Museum of Ancient Art, in Lisbon.

== History ==
Few documents about the Bemposta Monstrance have survived.

It was commissioned by Infante Peter of Portugal. In his will dictated in 1783, Infante Peter instructed Infante John, his successor over the dominion of the House of the Infantado, the appanage tied to the King's second eldest son, on "the great care he ought to take in the divine worship given to God in the Chapel of Bemposta Palace"; to this effect, he left "the precious Monstrance in [his] possession" to that estate's chapel. It is known that in 1832, during the Liberal Wars, the Monstrance (along with other treasures of the Crown and the House of the Infantado; notably the Patriarchal Monstrance) was taken to Queluz Palace and seized by King Michael I. It would only return to Lisbon in 1834, following the Convention of Evoramonte and the end of the civil war. In 1836, in line with the disentailment policies of the new constitutional regime, the Bemposta Monstrance found its way to the National Mint where it was evaluated by Court Assayer Justino Roberto de Sousa and was saved from melting by a report by the Treasury: "the ornateness of those pieces far exceeds their intrinsic value, we are of the opinion that it would be the height of barbarity to destroy them — a view that did not seem to please the workers of the National Mint."

It was then, from 1847, kept by Infanta Isabel Maria in her palace in Benfica. From there, it was incorporated into the collections of the Royal Academy of Fine Arts and thence, in 1884, to the new National Museum of Fine Arts and Archaeology (reorganised into the modern-day National Museum of Ancient Art in 1911).

The Monstrance had long been misattributed to João Frederico Ludovice and, by consequence, wrongly dated to the 1740s–50s at the latest. A modern restoration of the Monstrance, undertaken in 2013 for the exhibition "A Encomenda Prodigiosa: Da Patriarcal à Capela Real de São João Baptista" ("The Prodigious Commission: from the Patriarchal Basilica to the Royal Chapel of St. John the Baptist"), revealed a hidden inscription saying "El Rey D. Pedro 3º mandou fzr / En 13 Mayo de 1777" ("King Peter III commissioned it / 13 May 1777") and the signature "Adam Pollet". The date has great significance in that 13 May 1777 was the day of the solemn Acclamation of Queen Maria I, Infante Peter's wife, making him King jure uxoris — and suggesting the commission was a votive offering as thanksgiving for having prevailed over the Marquis of Pombal's schemes to hand the crown instead to Joseph, Prince of Brazil.

== Description ==
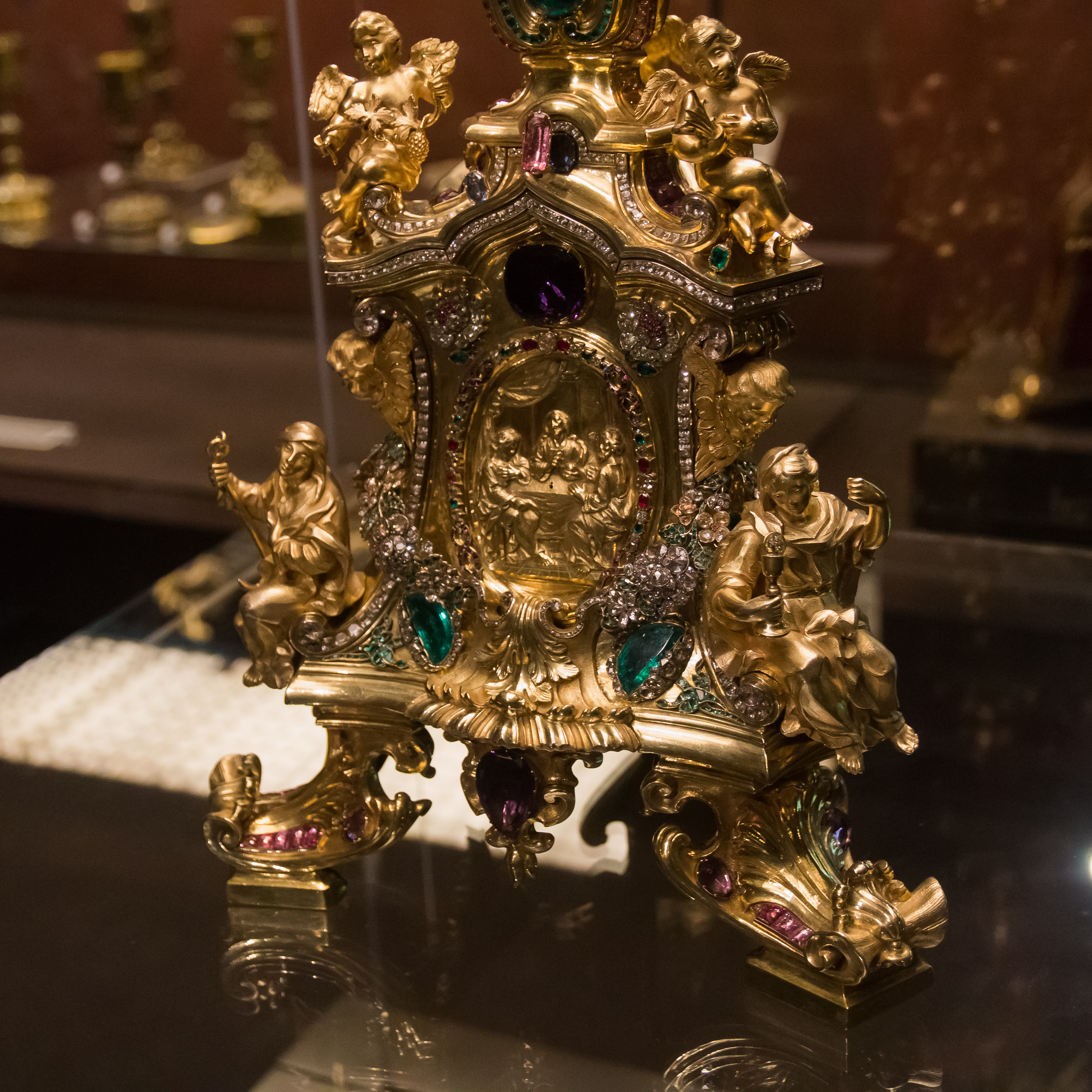
Detail of the Monstrance's supporting base, showing the figures of Faith, Hope and Charity

A monstrance functions as a vessel to present the consecrated host to the congregation as part of the Roman Catholic liturgical ritual of Eucharistic adoration.

A typical monstrance in form, the highly ornate Bemposta Monstrance comprises a sunburst framing the circular frame for the wafer (which has a curved holder set with stones that holds it up to view, its shape echoing the crescent moon that is usually depicted at the foot of Virgin Mary when evoking the Immaculate Conception) supported on an undulating stem that stands upon an intricately sculpted supporting base. The base is set with figures symbolising the three theological virtues (Faith, Hope and Charity) below angels with the symbols of the Eucharist, flanking narrative medallions showing scenes from the Passion cycle.

It is made of gilt silver, and set with numerous stones: diamonds, rubies, emeralds, sapphires, amethysts, chrysoberyls, topaz (colourless, Imperial, and pink).
