= Tantum ergo, WAB 42 =

Composition by Anton Bruckner

Tantum ergo
- Motet by Anton Bruckner
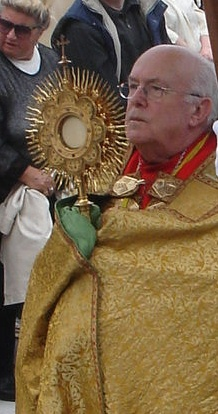
- Benediction of the Blessed Sacrament
- Key: D major
- Catalogue: WAB 42
- Form: Hymn
- Text: Tantum ergo
- Language: Latin
- Composed: 9 June 1846: St. Florian Abbey
- Published: 1893: Innsbruck
- Vocal: SSATB choir
- Instrumental: Organ

Tantum ergo ("Let us raise"), WAB 42, is a setting of the hymn Tantum ergo composed by Anton Bruckner in 1846.

== History ==
Bruckner composed this motet on 9 June 1846 during his stay in St. Florian Abbey. The autograph voice score, without the organ score, is present in the archive of the St. Florian Abbey.

In 1888, Bruckner revised this setting, together with the revision of previous four Tantum ergo. The revised version of the five Tantum ergo was published first by Johann Groß, Innsbruck in 1893.

The 1846 and 1888 versions are put in Band XXI/13 and 38 of the Gesamtausgabe respectively.

== Music ==
The works is scored in D major for SSATB choir and organ. The first setting is 36-bar long. The bars 21-32 are optional. In the 31-bar long revised version these optional bars are removed and a 3-bar Amen is added.

This fifth Tantum ergo is characterised by its marked solemness. After a climax on novo cedat rituit it goes on, diminuendo, to an intimate quasi-Mozartian coda.

== Selected discography ==
The first recording occurred in c. 1931:

- Ludwig Berberich, Münchner Domchor – 78 rpm: Christschall 118A (2nd version, a cappella)

=== 1846 version ===
There are only two recordings of this first version:

- Thomas Kerbl, Chorvereinigung Bruckner 09, Anton Bruckner Chöre/Klaviermusik – CD: LIVA 034 (first strophe only)
- Christian Erny, The Zurich Chamber Singers, Bruckner Spectrum - CD: Berlin Classics LC06203, 2022 (with a few deviations from the score)

Note: A live performance – without organ accompaniment – by Philipp von Steinäcker is available in the Bruckner Archive.

=== 1888 version ===
A selection among the about 20 recordings:

- Martin Flämig, Dresdner Kreuzchor, Ave Maria – Anton Bruckner: Geistliche Chöre - Motets – CD: Capriccio 10 081, 1985
- Magnar Mangersnes, Domchor Bergen, Bruckner: Motets – CD: Simax PSC 9037, 1996
- Hans-Christoph Rademann, NDR Chor Hamburg, Anton Bruckner: Ave Maria – CD: Carus 83.151, 2000
- Petr Fiala, Tschechischer Philharmonischer Chor Brno, Anton Bruckner: Motets - CD: MDG 322 1422-2, 2006
- Michael Stenov, Cantores Carmeli, Benefizkonzert Karmelitenkirche Linz - CD/DVD issued by the choir, 2006, and on YouTube.
- Erwin Ortner, Arnold Schoenberg Chor, Anton Bruckner: Tantum ergo - CD: ASC Edition 3, issue of the choir, 2008

== Sources ==
- Max Auer, Anton Bruckner als Kirchenmusiker, G. Bosse, Regensburg, 1927
- Anton Bruckner – Sämtliche Werke, Band XXI: Kleine Kirchenmusikwerke, Musikwissenschaftlicher Verlag der Internationalen Bruckner-Gesellschaft, Hans Bauernfeind and Leopold Nowak (Editor), Vienna, 1984/2001
- Cornelis van Zwol, Anton Bruckner 1824–1896 – Leven en werken, uitg. Thoth, Bussum, Netherlands, 2012. ISBN 978-90-6868-590-9
