= Dir, Herr, dir will ich mich ergeben =

1845 motet composed by Anton Bruckner

- Motet by Anton Bruckner
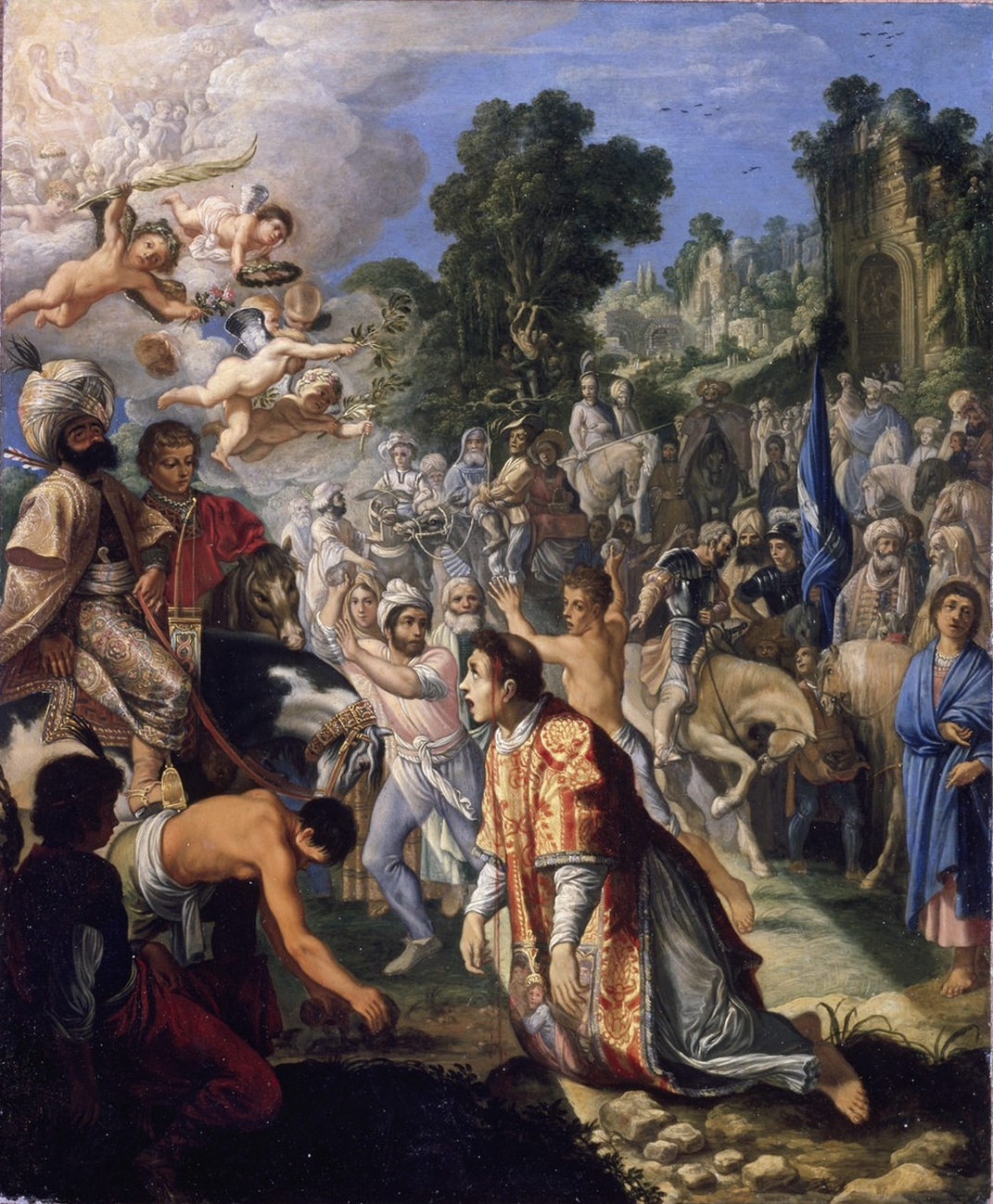
- Steinigung des heiligen Stephanus by Adam Elsheimer
- Key: A major
- Catalogue: WAB 12
- Form: Chorale
- Language: German
- Composed: c. 1845:
- Published: 1932: Regensburg
- Vocal: SATB choir

Dir, Herr, dir will ich mich ergeben (To Thee, Lord, to Thee will I surrender myself), WAB 12, is a sacred motet composed by Anton Bruckner in c. 1845.

== History ==
Bruckner composed the motet in c. 1845 either during his stay in Kronstorf or at the beginning of his stay in St. Florian Abbey. The original manuscript, on which the Tantum ergo, WAB 43 is also found, is in the archive of the St. Florian Abbey. The motet was first published in volume II/3, pp. 114–115 of the Göllerich/Auer biography. It is put in volume XXI/9 of the Gesamtausgabe.

== Text ==
Dir, Herr, dir will ich mich ergeben,
dir, dessen Eigentum ich bin.
Du nur allein, du bist mein Leben,
und Sterben wird mir dann Gewinn.
Ich lebe dir, ich sterbe dir,
sei du nur mein, so g'nügt es mir.

To Thee, Lord, to Thee will I surrender myself,
Thee, whose property I am.
Thou alone, Thou art my life,
and so death then becomes to me a gain.
I live for Thee, I die for Thee,
that Thou alone be mine, so am I fulfilled.

This text, which was also used by Felix Mendelssohn in his oratorio Paulus, is based on the ninth verse of the hymn Herr Gott, du kennest meine Tage by Ludwig Rudolph von Senftt zu Pilsach over the Stoning of Stephen.

== Music ==
The 32-bar work in A major is a chorale for mixed choir a cappella.

As Crawford Howie writes, "both In jener letzten der Nächte WAB 17 (c. 1848) and Dir, Herr, dir will ich mich ergeben WAB 12 (c. 1845) for a cappella mixed-voice choir are chorale harmonizations, probably the result of his studies with Zenetti."

== Selected discography ==
There are only a few recordings of Dir, Herr, dir will ich mich ergeben:

- Balduin Sulzer, Chor des Linzer Musikgymnasiums, Stiftskirche Wilhering - Geistliche Musik – CD: Preiserrecords 90052CD, c. 1985
- Thomas Kerbl, Chorvereinigung Bruckner 2011, Anton Bruckner: Lieder/Magnificat – CD: LIVA 046, 2011
- Philipp von Steinäcker, Vocalensemble Musica Saeculorum, Bruckner: Pange lingua - Motetten - CD: Fra Bernardo FB 1501271, 2015

== Sources ==
- August Göllerich, Anton Bruckner. Ein Lebens- und Schaffens-Bild, c. 1922 – posthumous edited by Max Auer by G. Bosse, Regensburg, 1932
- Max Auer, Anton Bruckner als Kirchenmusiker, G. Bosse, Regensburg, 1927
- Anton Bruckner – Sämtliche Werke, Band XXI: Kleine Kirchenmusikwerke, Musikwissenschaftlicher Verlag der Internationalen Bruckner-Gesellschaft, Hans Bauernfeind and Leopold Nowak (Editor), Vienna, 1984/2001
- Cornelis van Zwol, Anton Bruckner 1824–1896 – Leven en werken, uitg. Thoth, Bussum, Netherlands, 2012. ISBN 978-90-6868-590-9
- Crawford Howie, Anton Bruckner - A documentary biography, online revised edition
