= Tantum ergo =

Christian devotional hymn

Tantum Ergo sung in Latin
The Latin text of "Tantum Ergo" sung to its traditional melody, which is a mode I Gregorian chant.

"Tantum ergo" is the incipit of the last two verses of Pange lingua, a Medieval Latin hymn composed by St. Thomas Aquinas circa A.D. 1264. The phrases "Genitori genitoque" and "Procedenti ab utroque" for the Blessed Trinity as the closing doxology are adapted from Adam of Saint Victor's sequence for Pentecost. The hymn's Latin incipit literally translates to "Therefore so great".

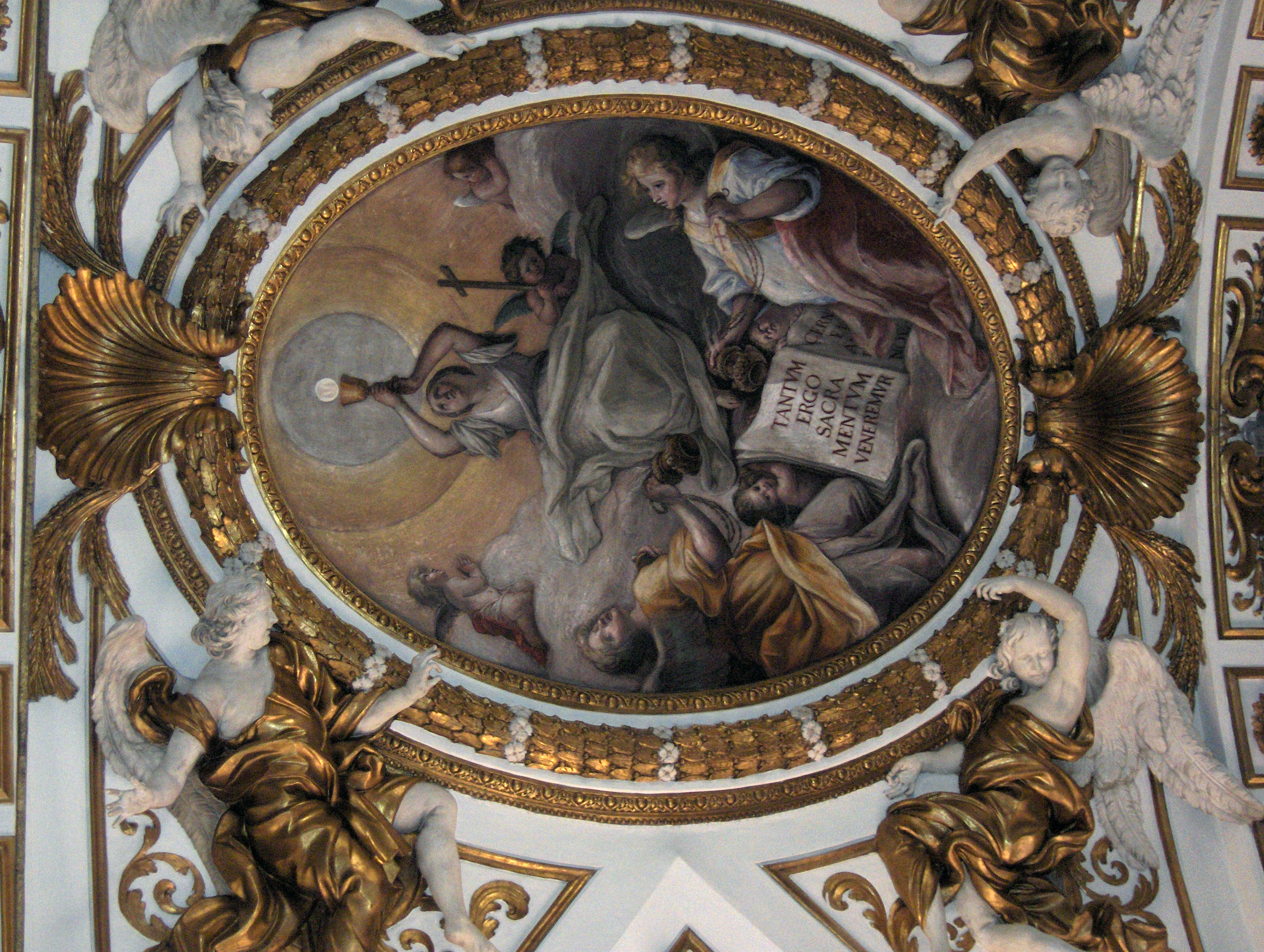
Ceiling of the Cathedral of San Rufino, Assisi, Italy with the inscription "tantum ergo sacramentum veneremur"

The singing of the Tantum ergo occurs during adoration and benediction of the Blessed Sacrament in the Catholic Church and other denominations that have this devotion. It is usually sung, though solemn recitation is sometimes done, and permitted.

== Tantum ergo lyrics ==
=== Latin ===
Tantum ergo sacramentum
Veneremur cernui,
et antiquum documentum
novo cedat ritui.
Præstet fides supplementum
sensuum defectui.

Genitori genitoque
laus et jubilatio,
Salus, honor, virtus quoque
sit et benedictio!
Procedenti ab utroque
compar sit laudatio!
Amen.

℣. Panem de cælis præstitisti eis (in Paschaltide and on Corpus Christi, 'Alleluia' is added).
℟. Omne delectamentum in se habentem^{[Wis 16:20]} (in Paschaltide and on Corpus Christi, 'Alleluia' is added).

℣. Oremus: Deus, qui nobis sub sacramento mirabili passionis tuæ memoriam reliquisti: tribue, quæsumus, ita nos corporis et sanguinis tui sacra mysteria venerari, ut redemptionis tuæ fructum in nobis jugiter sentiamus. Qui vivis et regnas in saecula saeculorum.

℟. Amen.

=== Literal translation ===
Therefore, so great a Sacrament
Let us venerate with heads bowed [cernui]
And let the old practice [documentum]
Give way to the new rite;
Let faith provide a supplement
For the failure of the senses.

To the Begetter and the Begotten [both masculine gender],
Be praise and jubilation,
Hail, honour, virtue also,
And blessing too:
To the One proceeding from Both
Let there be equal praise.

Amen.

℣. You have provided them bread from heaven.
℟. Having in itself [in se] all delight [delectamentum].

℣. Let us pray: O God, who to us in this wonderful Sacrament, bequeathed a memorial of Your Passion: grant, we beseech, that we, in worshipping [venerari; in addition to simple worship, may also mean worshipping in order to receive favour] the Holy Mysteries of Your Body and Blood, may within ourselves continually [iugiter], sensibly perceive [sentiamus] the fruit of Your redemption. You who live and reign into ages of ages.

℟. Amen.

=== English translation ===
A century-old translation, still used in Catholic churches liturgically, renders the hymn in a form which can be sung to the same tune as the Latin:

Down in adoration falling,
Lo! the Sacred Host we hail,
Lo! o'er ancient forms departing
Newer rites of grace prevail;
Faith for all defects supplying,
Where the feeble senses fail.
To the Everlasting Father,
And the Son Who reigns on high
With the Holy Ghost proceeding
Forth from Each eternally,
Be salvation, honour, blessing,
Might, and endless majesty. Amen.
℣. Thou hast given them bread from heaven.
℟. Having within it all sweetness.
℣. Let us pray: O God, who in this wonderful Sacrament left us a memorial of Thy Passion: grant, we implore Thee, that we may so venerate the Sacred Mysteries of Thy Body and Blood, as always to be conscious of the fruit of Thy Redemption. Thou who livest and reignest forever and ever.

℟. Amen.

=== ICEL translation ===
The following is found in the latest edition of the Holy Communion and Worship of the Eucharistic Mystery outside Mass (2024):

Let us, therefore, bow and worship,
Such a wondrous Sacrament;
Let the ancient law and custom
To a newer rite now yield;
Let our faith supply conviction
Where the senses tire and fail.
To the Father, unbegotten,
And the Sole-begotten Son,
Be salvation, blessing, honor,
Jubilation, power, and praise;
To the One from both proceeding,
Equal glory and renown. Amen.
However, the following verse-response You have given them bread from heaven, etc. is not included in the said revised edition, as reflective of the original Latin typical edition.
℣. Let us pray. O God, who in this wonderful Sacrament
have left us a memorial of your Passion,
grant us, we pray,
so to revere the sacred mysteries of your Body and Blood
that we may always experience in ourselves
the fruits of your redemption.
Who live and reign for ever and ever.
℟. Amen.

Other, more modern, English translations exist and are also used in Catholic churches liturgically.

== Theological aspects ==
The words "procedenti ab utroque / compar sit laudatio"—literally, "May equal praise be to the One proceeding from both"—refer to the Holy Spirit, which according to version of the Nicene Creed used in Western Christianity proceeds from both the Father and the Son.

A partial indulgence is granted to the faithful who devoutly recite the Tantum ergo. But a plenary indulgence is granted on Holy Thursday and on the feast of Corpus Christi, if it is recited in a solemn manner.

== Musical settings ==
The basic text has been set by numerous composers: from the Classical period John Francis Wade, the Renaissance (Palestrina), the Romantic period (Anton Bruckner, Hector Berlioz (H142), Gabriel Fauré, Franz Schubert, Louis Vierne), and modern composers (Maurice Duruflé, David Conte, Crys Armbrust).

Déodat de Séverac composed a motet set to the text.

Bruckner wrote eight settings of the text: WAB 32, WAB 43, WAB 41 (Nos. 1, 2, 3, 4), WAB 42, and WAB 44. Fauré wrote two settings: Op. 55, and Op. 62 No. 2. Schubert wrote six settings: D. 460, D. 461, D. 730, D. 739 (Op. 45), D. 750, and D. 962. Vierne's treatment of it is his Opus 2. Duruflé's setting is contained as No. 4 of his Op. 10, Quatre Motets sur des thèmes grégoriens, published in 1960, and uses the plainchant melody.

Samuel Webbe composed a motet in 87 87 meter, widely used in the English and American Catholic churches.

=== Former Austria-Hungary (incl. South Tyrol) ===
In the areas of the former Austro-Hungarian Empire, Tantum Ergo for Eucharistic Benedictions is frequently set to the tune of the Kaiserhymne (Gott erhalte, Gott beschütze), however not always repeating the refrain as in the anthems. This can be confirmed in Vienna and South Tyrol at the least.

=== Philippine use ===
The Church in the Philippines typically sings the Tantum ergo to a separate hymn tune ^{[another video]} from that of the rest of Pange lingua, whose first three strophes are otherwise sung to the original tune. This particular setting, which is of Spanish origin, is credited to a José Rafael Carreras y Bulbena and was originally published with a time signature of 3/4 but is now sung in quadruple metre in Luzon and in quadruple then triple metre in the Visayas.

==== Let Us Raise Our Voice ====
This tune is also used to sing "Let Us Raise Our Voice", a loose English adaptation of the Tantum ergo. This is borne out of a commission on revising the Novena by the Redemptorists of the Manila and Cebu Vice-Provinces in the early 1970s, in the wake of liturgical reforms. The hymn, whose lyrics paraphrase the first two forms of the Memorial Acclamation of the Mass, is sung during the Wednesday Novena Service to Our Lady of Perpetual Help and Benediction at Baclaran Church (the icon's principal shrine in the country). It also employs a different collect.

Let us raise our voice to proclaim our Faith:
Christ the Lord, for us has died;
Dying, He destroyed our death,
Rising, He restored our life.
O Lord Jesus, we await
Your last return in glory.

When we eat the bread and we drink the cup
In the blessed Eucharist
We meet You, our Risen Saviour,
Giving life to us anew.
Through life’s journey be with us,
To strengthen us forever.
Amen, Amen.

℣. You have given them bread from heaven [Alleluia].
℟. The source of all happiness [Alleluia].

℣. Let us pray: Lord God, by the Paschal Mystery of the Death and Resurrection of Your only Son, You accomplish the work of man’s redemption. Full of trust, we proclaim the Paschal Mystery in the sacramental signs of the Eucharist. Help us to see ever growing in us the fruits of Your saving work; through Christ Our Lord.

℟. Amen.
