= Cesare e Cleopatra =

Opera by Carl Heinrich Graun

- dramma per musica by Carl Heinrich Graun
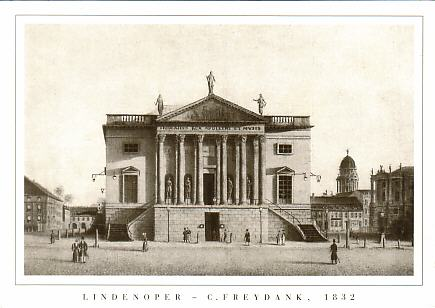
- Royal Opera House in Berlin, where the work was performed (in German) for the opening
- Librettist: Giovan Gualberto Bottarelli
- Language: Italian
- Premiere: 7 December 1742; Königliches Opernhaus, Berlin

Cesare e Cleopatra is a dramma per musica, that consists of three acts, by composer Carl Heinrich Graun. The opera uses an Italian-language libretto by Giovan Gualberto Bottarelli.

== Performances ==
It was commissioned by Frederick II of Prussia for the opening of the newly built Königliches Opernhaus (Royal Opera House) in Berlin, and was notably the inaugural performance of the newly formed Berlin State Opera.

Although construction of the opera house was not entirely complete, the opera premiered in the new theatre using a German language translation on 7 December, 1742, under the baton of the composer. The production starred soprano Maria Giovanna Gasparini as Cleopatra VII and castrato Paolo Bedeschi as Julius Caesar.

== Recordings ==
- 1992 on the Serenissima label (360171), live: Jacobs/Williams-J/Dawson/Beronesi/Popken/Francis/Rayam/Trekel
- 1995 on the HM label (mis-titled "Cleopatra e Cesare"): René Jacobs; Janet Williams (Cleopatra), Iris Vermillion (Cesare), Lynne Dawson (Cornelia), Robert Gambill (Tolomeo), Ralf Popken (Arsace), Jeffrey Francis (Lentulo), Klaus Häger (Achilla), Elisabeth Scholl (Cneo), María Cristina Kiehr (Sesto). RIAS Kammerchor, Concerto Köln. Recorded Jesus-Christus-Kirche, Berlin-Dahlem April–May 1995.
- 2017 on the Sony label: Cleopatra e Cesare, WV B:I:7: Tra le procelle assorto (Aria) · Regula Mühlemann · Carl Heinrich Graun · La Folia Barockorchester · Robin Peter Müller
