= Iris Vermillion =

German operatic mezzo-soprano

- Born: 1960 (age 64–65); Bielefeld, West Germany
- Education: Hochschule für Musik Detmold; Hochschule für Musik und Theater Hamburg
- Occupation: Operatic mezzo-soprano
- Organizations: Deutsche Oper Berlin
- Awards: Der Faust; Grammy Award

Iris Vermillion (born 1960) is a German operatic mezzo-soprano. A member of the Deutsche Oper Berlin from 1988, she has enjoyed an international career, appearing in Amsterdam with Nikolaus Harnoncourt and at the Salzburg Festival, among others.

== Career ==
Born in Bielefeld, Vermillion studied flute and voice at the Hochschule für Musik Detmold and the Hochschule für Musik und Theater Hamburg with Mechthild Böhme and Judith Beckmann. She took master classes with Erik Werba, Christa Ludwig and Hermann Prey.

She worked first at the Staatstheater Braunschweig and was engaged from 1988 at the Deutsche Oper Berlin by Götz Friedrich. She was known internationally by performances of Mozart parts with Nikolaus Harnoncourt in Amsterdam, Dorabella in Così fan tutte and Cherubino in Le nozze di Figaro. Another internationally noted performance was the part of Clairon in the 1991 Salzburg Festival production of Capriccio by Richard Strauss, conducted by Horst Stein. In 1997, she appeared as Selim in the first revival in modern times of Hasse's Solimano at the Innsbruck Festival of Early Music, in a production staged by Georg Quander and conducted by René Jacobs, with Thomas Randle in the title role. Vermillion also collaborated with Claudio Abbado, Daniel Barenboim and Giuseppe Sinopoli.

She was awarded the prize Der Faust for her performance in the title role of Othmar Schoeck's Penthesilea at the Semperoper in 2008. In 2012, she performed the part of Klytämnestra in Elektra by Strauss at the Graz Opera, followed by the Nurse in his Die Frau ohne Schatten at the Teatro Colón and the Kostelnička Buryjovka in Janáček's Jenůfa.

Her recordings include operas such as Mozart's Idomeneo and Salome by Richard Strauss. In a 1995 recording of Carl Heinrich Graun's Cesare e Cleopatra, with René Jacobs conducting the RIAS Kammerchor and the Concerto Köln, she appears as Cesare, alongside Janet Williams as Cleopatra), Lynne Dawson as Cornelia, Ralf Popken as Arsace, Elisabeth Scholl as Cneo and María Cristina Kiehr as Sesto. She recorded in 1996 the leading female role Bianca in Zemlinsky's Eine florentinische Tragödie, alongside Heinz Kruse as Guido and Albert Dohmen as Simone, with Riccardo Chailly conducting the Royal Concertgebouw Orchestra. She participated in a 1997 recording of Wagner's Die Meistersinger von Nürnberg which was awarded the Grammy 1998 as Best Opera Recording. Georg Solti conducted Chicago Symphony Orchestra, with José van Dam as Sachs, Karita Mattila as Eva, Ben Heppner as Stolzing, Herbert Lippert as David and her as Magdalene. In 2016 she was part of a complete recording of Wagner's Der Ring des Nibelungen, conducted by Marek Janowski, singing Fricka alongside Tomasz Konieczny as Wotan, with the Rundfunk-Sinfonieorchester Berlin.

In concert and recital, she recorded Lieder by Alma Mahler, Beethoven's Missa solemnis and Mahler's Das Lied von der Erde and his Second Symphony. She recorded Mahler's symphony also in a version by Hermann Behn for two pianos, performed by soprano Daniela Bechly, pianists Christiane Behn and Mathias Weber, and the Harvestehuder Kammerchor, conducted by Claus Bantzer. She performed and recorded concerts with the Gächinger Kantorei for the Internationale Bachakademie Stuttgart, including in 2000 Wolfgang Rihm's Deus passus, with Juliane Banse, Cornelia Kallisch, Christoph Prégardien, Andreas Schmidt and the Bach-Collegium Stuttgart, conducted by Helmuth Rilling, and in 2002 Beethoven's Symphony No. 9 with Camilla Nylund, Jonas Kaufmann and Franz-Josef Selig, conducted by Roger Norrington.

== Awards ==
- 1985: Second prize of the International Brahms Competition in Hamburg
- 1986: First prize of the Bundeswettbewerb Gesang
- 1997: Grammy, Best Opera Recording: Wagner Die Meistersinger von Nürnberg
- 2008: Der Faust

== Literature ==
- Vermillion, Iris. In Karl Josef Kutsch and Leo Riemens Großes Sängerlexikon. Directmedia Digitale Bibliothek 33, Berlin 2000, ISBN 3-89853-133-3
