= Graun =

Graun may refer to:

- Graun im Vinschgau (Curon Venosta), a municipality in Italy
- Carl Heinrich Graun (1704–1759), a German composer
- Johann Gottlieb Graun (1703–1771), a German composer and violinist
- A nickname for The Guardian, a UK newspaper, from "Grauniad"
