= Howard Arman =

English choral conductor and opera director

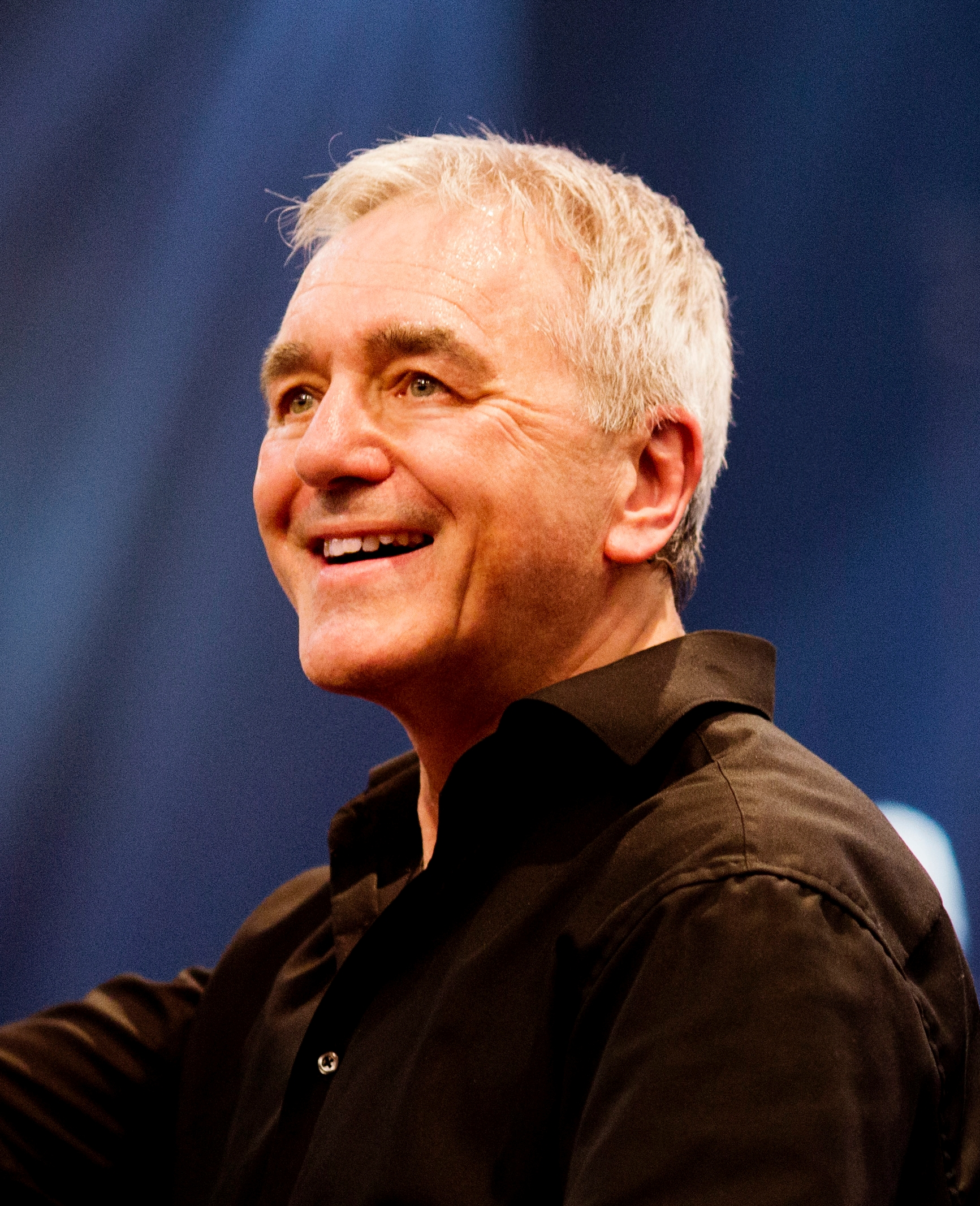
- Howard Arman in 2018
- Born: 1954 (age 71–72); London
- Education: Trinity College of Music
- Occupations: Choral conductor; Opera director; Festival director; Academic teacher
- Organizations: RIAS Kammerchor; Handel Festival, Halle; Mozarteum
- Awards: Handel Prize

Howard Arman (born 1954 in London) is an English choral conductor and opera director. He won the Handel Prize of the Handel Festival, Halle, in 1996, shaped the festival's orchestra and conducted operas of George Frideric Handel. He is a conductor of the Theater and Philharmonie Thüringen, also the Luzerner Theater. Since 2017 he is the director of the Bayerische Rundfunk Chor.

== Career ==
Howard Arman studied at the Trinity College of Music in London. He first worked with leading British ensembles, but moved to Austria and Germany in 1981.

Arman has conducted (among others) the radio choirs of the Norddeutscher Rundfunk, the Südwestrundfunk, the Österreichischer Rundfunk and the RIAS Kammerchor. From 1983 to 2000 he was the leader of the Salzburger Bach-Chor and since 1998 he has been director and artistic leader of the MDR Rundfunkchor, the choir of the Mitteldeutscher Rundfunk (MDR). He is general music director of Theater and Philharmonie Thüringen for the 2010/2011 season and musical director of the Lucerne theatre for three years from the 2011/12 season onwards. Since 2010/11 he has been the musical leader of the Luzerner Sinfonieorchester (LSO), with James Gaffigan as the LSO's conductor.

In 1984 he prepared the Tölzer Knabenchor for a recording of Bach's Mass in B minor with Andrew Parrott and the Taverner Consort and Players Starting in 1993 he shaped the Händel-Festspielorchester, the orchestra of the Handel Festival, on period instruments, which earned him the Festival's Handel Prize of 1996. He conducted Handel's opera Tolomeo in 1996 at the festival, probably the first production and recording of the work with period instruments. In 2000 he recorded Rachmaninoff's All-Night Vigil with the MDR-Rundfunkchor. In 2005 Arman conducted Purcell's Dido and Aeneas at the Luzerner Theater. In 2006 Arman conducted Handel's opera Admeto at the Handel Festival, directed by Axel Köhler and recorded. In 2009 he recorded in the Marktkirche in Halle, the church where Handel was baptized, the opening concert of the Handel Special Day, a collaboration of 40 broadcasters. Four choirs and two orchestras reconstructed a memorial concert, held for the composer in 1784 in Westminster Abbey, including Zadok the Priest (one of Handel's Coronation Anthems). In 2010 Arman conducted Mozart's Le nozze di Figaro at the Luzerner Theater, directed by David Herrmann. Arman recorded Heinrich Ignaz Franz Biber's Marienvesper 1693 (Vesperae longiores ac breviores (1693), a setting of the Vespers), with the Salzburger Bach-Chor.

Arman has been a professor at the Mozarteum in Salzburg. Since 2017 he is the director of the Bayerische Rundfunk Chor.

== Selected recordings ==
- Howard Arman: Metamorphosen – MDR-Rundfunkchor (MDR Klassik, 2013)
- Johann Sebastian Bach: Motetten – Chor des Bayerischen Rundfunks und die Akademie für Alte Musik Berlin (BR-Klassik, 2018)
- Heinrich Ignaz Franz Biber: Marienvesper – Salzburger Barockensemble und der Salzburger Bachchor (Ars Musici, 1996)
- Thomas Buchholz: Kammersinfonie VIII – Händelfestspielorchester Halle (Thorofon Classics, 1998)
- Antonín Dvořák: Stabat Mater – Chor des Bayerischen Rundfunks (BR-Klassik, 2019)
- Carl Heinrich Graun: Der Tod Jesu – MDR Rundfunkchor und das MDR Leipzig Radio Symphony Orchestra (MDR Edition, 2004)
- Georg Friedrich Händel: Occasional Oratorio – Chor des Bayerischen Rundfunks und die Akademie für Alte Musik Berlin (BR-Klassik, 2017)
- Felix Mendelssohn Bartholdy: Psalmen – Chor des Bayerischen Rundfunks und das Munich Radio Orchestra (BR-Klassik, 2017)
- Wolfgang Amadeus Mozart: Große Messe in c-Moll – Chor des Bayerischen Rundfunks und das Munich Radio Orchestra (BR-Klassik, 2018)
- Wolfgang Amadeus Mozart: Requiem – Chor des Bayerischen Rundfunks und das Munich Radio Orchestra (BR-Klassik, 2020)
- Claudio Monteverdi: Vesper zum Fest Christi Himmelfahrt – Schütz-Akademie (Capriccio, 1996)
- Sergei Rachmaninoff: Vespers – MDR Rundfunkchor (Berlin Classics, 2002)
- Gioachino Rossini: Stabat Mater – Chor des Bayerischen Rundfunks und das Munich Radio Orchestra (Sony Classical, 2018)
- Heinrich Schütz: Musikalische Exequien – Schütz-Akademie (Berlin Classics, 2005)
- Robert Schumann: Chorwerke – MDR Rundfunkchor (MDR Edition, 2005)
- Othmar Schoeck: Chorwerke – MDR Rundfunkchor (Claves Records, 2007)
