= Volkher Häusler =

German conductor

Volker Häusler
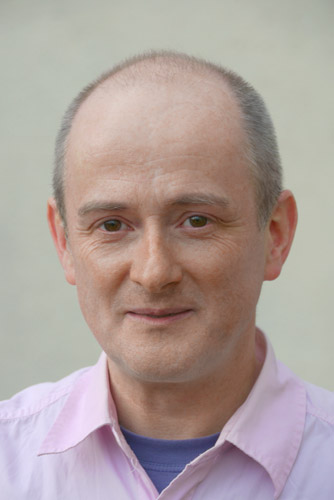
- Volkher Häusler in 2009
- Born: 14 August 1958; Krumbach, Bavaria
- Education: Hochschule für Musik und Theater München; Berlin University of the Arts; Hochschule für Musik Franz Liszt, Weimar
- Occupations: Choral conductor; Composer; Music pedagogue
- Organization: MendelssohnKammerChor

Volkher Häusler (born 14 August 1958) is a German conductor, composer and church musician. He is artistic director of the MendelssohnKammerChor in Berlin.

== Life ==
Born in Krumbach, Bavaria, Häusler passed his Abitur in 1979 at the Theresien-Gymnasium Munich. He then began studying music at the Hochschule für Musik und Theater München, where he was taught, among others, by Hedwig Bilgram and in choral conducting by Fritz Schieri. At a summer course, he was taught by the musicologist Wilhelm Ehmann. In 1980, he took part in a master class on Baroque performance practice, led by the tenor Ernst Haefliger and the conductor Diethard Hellmann. In 1981, he began additional studies in concert organ with Bilgram. In 1983, he completed his studies in Munich with the A exam.

In 1983, Häusler moved to Berlin where he worked as an organist and continued his studies at the Berlin University of the Arts in 1983. In 1989, he also took over the direction of a seminaron Voice training at the Hochschule für evangelische Kirchenmusik Bayreuth. During his last two years of study in Berlin, Häusler worked as a répétiteur at the Theater Erfurt.

In 1986, Häusler founded the Kreuzberger Kantorei, a professional vocal ensemble, with whom he gave concert tours and made radio productions. He conducted several world premieres with them of works by Volker Wangenheim, with whom he completed further conducting studies from 2004 to 2006. The ensemble was renamed in 2005 to MendelssohnKammerChor Berlin, indicating a focus on the works by Felix Mendelssohn, his sister Fanny Hensel and Arnold Mendelssohn, and others of the period.

In 1992, he took part in a master class at the Internationale Bachakademie Stuttgart with Helmuth Rilling. From 1994 to 1999, Häusler studied orchestral conducting at the Hochschule für Musik Franz Liszt, Weimar, where he was particularly influenced by Colin Metters and Gunter Kahlert and graduated with a Kapellmeister diploma. He studied choral conducting with Gert Frischmuth and harpsichord with Bernhard Klapprott, and also took master classes with George Alexander Albrecht and Eric Ericson.

Since 2001, Häusler has also worked as a repetiteur with conducting duties as assistant to the Generalmusikdirektor at the Volkstheater Rostock. He was engaged as a permanent guest conductor since 1998 at the Schönebecker Operettensommer. In 2004, he was a guest lecturer at the Hochschule für Musik und Tanz Köln.

Häusler has worked, among others, with orchestras such as the Jenaer Philharmonie, the Mitteldeutsche Kammerphilharmonie and the Norddeutsche Philharmonie, as well as artists like Andreas Baesler, Helge Leiberg, Josef Protschka and Arila Siegert.

Häusler is also active as a pianist, Liedbegleiter and composer and teaches conducting, accompaniment, singing and choral voice training.

== Recordings ==
- Kreuzberger Kantorei / Volkher Häusler: Schütz, Bach, Distler (1993)
- Kreuzberger Kantorei / Volkher Häusler: Pepping-Collection – Volume 10: Missa Dona nobis pacem, Ein jegliches hat seine Zeit, Chorale movements
- MendelssohnKammerChor Berlin / Volkher Häusler: Lukas-Passion by Schütz (2004)
