= Fritz Schieri =

Fritz Franz Schieri (27 March 1922 in Munich – 24 February 2009 in Dachau) was a German composer, conductor and professor.

After Schieri left school in Munich 1940, he started his study at the Musikhochschule München in 1946. He founded a "Studenten-Madrigalchor" in 1947. Schieri became docent for music theory and chorus line at the Hochschule für Musik und Tanz Köln in 1948. He led choir weeks and choir seminaries in Altenberg and the Wies.

He became professor for chorus line, composition and music theory at the Hochschule für Musik und Theater München from 1959 until 1990. He became president of the college from 1972 until 1981 and honorary president in 1987.

Well-known students of his were Helmut Bieler (composer), Winfried Bönig (organist), Paul Engel (composer and conductor), Volkher Häusler (conductor and choir leader) and Gerhard Merkl (Kapellmeister of Passau Cathedral).

Schieri participated in the ecumenical translation of the Psalms, in the working group "Musik im Gottesdienst" and the Gotteslob and as a creator of many other pieces of music.
