= Erhard Ragwitz =

German musicologist and composer (1933–2017)

Erhard Ragwitz (1 September 1933 – 16 December 2017) was a German composer and lecturer. From 1986 to 1989, he was the rector of the Hochschule für Musik "Hanns Eisler".

== Life and career ==
Ragwitz is from Königsberg, the capital of the Province of East Prussia. An autodidact, he learned to play the violin, bandoneon and piano in his childhood. He attended a school in Colditz, Saxony, where he founded an instrumental group and directed the choir. He was discovered by Fritz Reuter, who after the Abitur enabled him to study music. He later was a student of Ottmar Gerster. Reuter studied musicology, music education, music theory and composition at the Staatliche Hochschule für Theater und Musik Halle and the University of Music and Theatre Leipzig as well as at the Institute for Music Education at the Martin Luther University of Halle-Wittenberg.

In 1960, he became an assistant and aspirant (with Wilhelm Weismann), in 1964 a teacher and in 1968 a lecturer at the Hochschule für Musik in Leipzig. Temporarily, he also served as prorector for teaching and professional practice. From 1973, he taught at the Hochschule für Musik Hanns Eisler Berlin. From 1973 to 1976, he held the post of director of the Musikgymnasium Carl Philipp Emanuel Bach. From 1976 to 1978 he held the office of Prorektor der Hochschule. In 1978, he took over a professorship for composition (Tonsatz). In 1981, he became head of the composition and music theory department. As successor to Olaf Koch, he was appointed rector of the Hochschule in Berlin on 19 September 1986. Following a request by the School's Honorary Commission, he was dismissed in November 1989 by the Senate of Berlin for Science and Research.

Ragwitz was a member of the central board of the Verband der Komponisten und Musikwissenschaftler der DDR. Since the beginning of the 1960s, he has been composing orchestral, chamber and vocal music (cantatas, choral works, songs, arrangements). In 1981, the Deutsches Nationaltheater und Staatskapelle Weimar under Rolf Reuter premiered his 1st Symphony and in 1986 under Oleg Caetani his 2nd Symphony for the premiere.

From 1971 to 1974, Ragwitz, who was a member of the SED, served as a candidate for the SED-Bezirksleitung Leipzig. He is married to the music educator and cultural politician Ursula Ragwitz (1928 – 2020).

Ragwitz died in Berlin on 16 December 2017, at the age of 84.

== Work ==
Among others, Ragwitz composed the following pieces:

Orchestral music

- Festliche Ouvertüre (1965)
- Suite (1965)
- Drei Sätze für Streichorchester (1967)
- Divertimento für Streichorchester und Pauken (1968)
- Sinfonia intrada (1975)
- Divertimento für Trompete, Streichorchester und Pauke (1979)
- Sinfonie (1980)

Piano music

- Bagatellen (1961)
- 4 Kleine Klavierstücke (1961)
- Intermezzo marcota (1974)
- 2 Sonaten (1968, 1977)

Vocal music

- Song vom Klasseneinmaleins (Helmut Preißler, 1958)
- Lied vom Besserwissen (Helmut Preißler, 1958)
- Kantate der Freundschaft für Soli, Chor und Orchester (J. Wächtler, 1962)
- Zwei A-capella-Chöre (1963)
- Frühling der Jugend (Rose Nyland, 1964)
- Johann-Sebastian-Bach-Poem für Alt-Solo, Chor und Kammerorchester nach Johannes R. Becher (1970)
- Liederzyklus „Das lachende Herz“ mit Streichern und Klavier nach Texten von Johannes R. Becher (1979)

== Recording ==
- Sinfonie Nr. 1 op. 45 / Johann-Sebastian-Bach-Poem op. 28 / Drei Sätze für Streichorchester op. 22 (Nova, 1984) – Orchester der Komischen Oper Berlin and Rolf Reuter (conductor) / Rosemarie Lang (contralto), Rundfunkchor Leipzig, Collegium musicum Leipzig and Jochen Wehner (conductor) / Collegium musicum Leipzig und Jochen Wehner (conductor) – 1983 recording
