= Jochen Wehner =

German conductor, producer and arrangeur (1936–2020)

Jochen Wehner (7 March 1936 – 9 June 2020) was a German conductor, music producer, arranger and Lektor.

== Life ==
Born in Göttingen, Wehner studied conducting in Halle and at the Hochschule für Musik Carl Maria von Weber Dresden and obtained degrees in musical composition, clarinet and violoncello. After graduating, he worked as Kapellmeister at the Theater Magdeburg, the Brandenburger Theater and in Stendal. In 1970, he was engaged at the Mecklenburgisches Staatstheater Schwerin as general music director. His affinity for contemporary music and composition led him to join the MDR Rundfunkchor in Leipzig in 1973. From 1973 to 1990, he worked as a producer, conductor and editor for Neue Musik at the Leipzig radio station. As conductor of the MDR Rundfunkchor, he was responsible for numerous recordings. These include the Madrigals by Paul Hindemith, the choral cycle Japan Suite by Hugo Herrmann, the Bach Poem by Erhard Ragwitz and the cycle In der Natur op. 63 by Antonín Dvořák. Together with Gerhard Richter and Gert Frischmuth, Wehner supervised the Rundfunkchor on an interim basis between 1978 and 1980. At the same time, he held a teaching position in score playing and conducting at the University of Music and Theatre Leipzig. Guest conducting engagements took him to radio stations in Poland, Czechoslovakia and Romania, as well as to renowned orchestras such as the Staatskapelle Dresden and the Berliner Symphoniker.

Even before German reunification, Wehner was contracted as chief conductor at the Värmlandsoperan in Karlstad, Sweden. In addition, permanent guest conductorships took him to the Göteborgsoperan and the Oslo Opera House. In 1994, he returned to Leipzig and took over the position of principal conductor of the Sächsische Bläserphilharmonie. During this time, he became a leading figure in the founding of the German Wind Academy, which set itself the task of promoting young wind players. The Academy's offerings are now taken up by numerous amateur and professional musicians from all over Europe.

After his retirement in 2000, Wehner took on numerous projects. In 2004, he conducted a concert of Beethoven's Symphony No. 9 as part of the celebrations for "10 years of cultural relations between Germany and Romania" in Cluj-Napoca. A year later he was on the conductor's podium of the Hofer Symphoniker and the youth wind orchestra of the North Bavarian Music Association. Guest conductorships have taken him to the Südwestdeutsche Philharmonie Konstanz, the Hohentwiel Festival in 2007, the municipal wind orchestra of Singen and the Balingen Music Days.

Wehner lived in Heiligenberg, near Lake Constance, from 2000 until his death aged 84. His final resting place is at the Leipzig Südfriedhof.
