= MDR Rundfunkchor =

German radio choir based in Leipzig

- Choir
- Origin: Leipzig, Saxony, Germany
- Founded: 1946
- Founder: Heinrich Werlé
- Genre: Professional mixed choir
- Members: 73
- Chief conductor: Philipp Ahmann
- Awards: Echo Klassik
- Website: www.mdr.de/konzerte/rundfunkchor/

MDR Rundfunkchor is the radio choir of the German broadcaster Mitteldeutscher Rundfunk (MDR), based in Leipzig, Saxony. Dating back to 1924, the choir became the radio choir of a predecessor of the MDR in 1946, then called Kammerchor des Senders Leipzig, or Rundfunkchor Leipzig. The present name was established in 1992. The choir has appeared internationally, and has made award-winning recordings.

== History ==
The origin of the later MDR Rundfunkchor was a choir called Leipziger Oratorienvereinigung (Leipzig oratorio association), that appeared first on 14 December 1924 in a broadcast of the Mitteldeutsche Rundfunk AG (MIRAG) of Haydn's Die Schöpfung, conducted by Alfred Szendrei. A 1931 broadcast featured a Leipziger Solistenchor (Leipzig soloists choir). The choir was renamed on 1 July 1934, as Kammerchor des Reichssenders Leipzig, when the broadcaster became Reichssender Leipzig. In 1934, the future choirmaster Heinrich Werlé appeared frequently as guest conductor. From 1935 to 1940, Curt Kretzschmar was choral director. The first surviving recordings date back to 1937: A cappella recording with folk songs and radio recording of the Aria of Marie from Donizetti's La fille du régiment conducted by Curt Kretzschmar. In May 1941, the choir was delegated to the Reichssender München. At the end of 1942, the choir was dissolved. Fourteen former choir members were taken over by the Bruckner Choir St. Florian Monastery of the Großdeutscher Rundfunk from 1943 to 1945. This was taken over by Thomaskantor Günther Ramin and transferred to Linz in 1944.

After World War II, the choir was taken over by the new Mitteldeutscher Rundfunk. Conducted by Heinrich Werlé, it was formed by 27 singers, women and men. He was supported by Dietrich Knothe from 1952 on (dismissed for political reasons in October 1962), which was intended primarily for a cappella works and rehearsals. The concert tour through Scandinavia (Denmark, Finland and Sweden) in October 1957 marked the choir's international breakthrough. In the same year the choir gave a guest performance in CSSR. In 1964, Horst Neumann was engaged as guest conductor; from 1967 to 1978, and thus as successor to Armin Oeser, he was choir director. From 1969 the choir gave concerts for schoolchildren. From 1978 to 1980 the choir had three interim conductors: Jochen Wehner, Gerhard Richter and Gert Frischmuth. In 1980, Jörg-Peter Weigle took over the direction of the choir and from 1985 onwards the chief conductor. In 1982 the choir and the MDR Leipzig Radio Symphony Orchestra gave guest performances in Japan conducted by Wolf-Dieter Hauschild. Gert Frischmuth became chief conductor in 1988 and choir director in 1992. In January 1989 the choir was the first ensemble from the GDR to perform in Israel under Kurt Masur's direction.

In January 1992, the broadcaster was reorganised, and the choir renamed MDR Rundfunkchor. On the occasion of its 50th anniversary the choir gave a jubilee concert in 1996 Howard Arman was choral conductor from 1998. The choir toured to Qatar several times between 2008 and 2014, followed by concerts in France, Italy, Monaco and Switzerland. Risto Joost was artistic director from 2015 to 2020. Philipp Ahmann has been the choir's first guest conductor between 2013 and 2016, and has been appointed as artistic director in 2020.

The MDR Rundfunkchor has an extensive repertoire (a cappella, choral symphonic works, ensemble singing, secular and sacred music). In addition, it has appeared as a special ensemble for Neue Musik with numerous premieres and world premieres and others. Boris Blacher, Thomas Buchholz, Thomas Bürkholz, Alan Bush, Jean-Luc Darbellay, Paul Dessau, Paul-Heinz Dittrich, Hanns Eisler, Fritz Geißler, Sofia Gubaidulina, Hans Werner Henze, Günter Kochan, Marek Kopelent, Wilfried Krätzschmar, Ernst Hermann Meyer, Günter Neubert, Krzysztof Penderecki, Rudolf Wagner-Régeny, Gerhard Rosenfeld, Friedrich Schenker, Kurt Schwaen, Siegfried Thiele, Carlos Veerhoff and Udo Zimmermann. More than 200 sound carriers have been released so far. The choir performed at international festivals such as Aix-en-Provence Festival, the Dresden Music Festival, Salzburg Festival, The Proms in London, and the Wiener Festwochen, among others. In 2019, the choir participated in the opening concert of the Rheingau Musik Festival at Eberbach Abbey, singing Dvořák's Stabat Mater with the hr-Sinfonieorchester, conducted by Andrés Orozco-Estrada. Conductors like Claudio Abbado, Karl Böhm, Riccardo Chailly, Sir Colin Davis, Bernard Haitink, Herbert von Karajan, James Levine, Lorin Maazel, Kurt Masur, Sir Neville Marriner, Riccardo Muti, Roger Norrington, Seiji Ozawa, Georges Prêtre, Sir Simon Rattle and Wolfgang Sawallisch have already conducted the orchestra. In addition to regular cooperation with the MDR Symphony Orchestra and the Gewandhausorchester, the choir has performed repeatedly with the Dresdner Staatskapelle, the Dresdner Philharmonie and the Staatskapelle Weimar.

== Choir director ==
- Heinrich Werlé (1946)
- Horst Karl Hessel (1947–1948)
- Herbert Kegel (1949–1978)
- Wolf-Dieter Hauschild (1978–1980)
- Jörg-Peter Weigle (1980–1988)
- Gert Frischmuth (1988–1998)
- Howard Arman (1998–2013)
- Risto Joost (2015–2019)
- Philipp Ahmann (since 2020)

== Recordings ==
A recording of MDR Rundfunkchor of Carl Heinrich Graun's Der Tod Jesu, with the MDR Sinfonieorchester conducted by Howard Arman, was awarded the Echo Klassik 2005 in the category best recording of the 17th/18th centuries. The choir recorded Rachmaninoff's All-Night Vigil twice, in 2000 conducted by Arman, and in 2016 conducted by Risto Joost. A reviewer noted: "Extremely well prepared MDR Rundfunkchor communicates an impeccable, focused sound and is unerringly responsive to the sacred text."

== Awards ==
- 19??: Vaterländischer Verdienstorden in Bronze
- 19??: Grand Prix du Disque for Carl Orff's Trionfi
- 1977: Gerhart-Eisler-Plakette in Gold
- 2005: ECHO Klassik (category: "Chorwerkeinspielung des 17./18. Jahrhunderts") for: Carl Heinrich Graun's Der Tod Jesu
- 2017: International Classical Music Awards (category: Chormusik) for Geistliche Gesänge, motets by Bach and Max Reger, and Knut Nystedt's Immortal Bach
- 2018: Diapason d'or für Rachmaninoff's All-Night Vigil

== Literature ==
- Alain Pâris: Klassische Musik im 20. Jahrhundert: Instrumentalisten, Sänger, Dirigenten, Orchester, Chöre, second revised edition, dtv, Munich, 1997, ISBN 3-423-32501-1, p. 919.
