= University of Music and Theatre Munich =

Institution of higher education in Munich, Germany

Coordinates: 48°08′46″N 11°34′04″E

Hochschule für Musik und Theater München
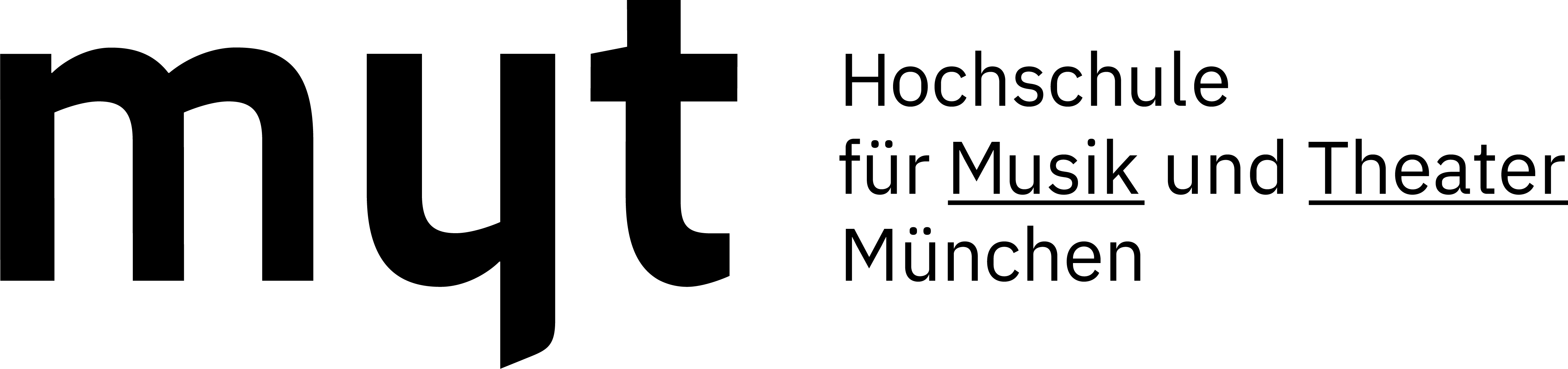
- Type: Public
- Established: 1846; 180 years ago
- President: Bernd Redmann
- Academic staff: 125 professors
- Students: 1098 (SS 2019)
- Location: Munich, Bavaria, Germany
- Campus: Urban
- Website: hmtm.de/en/

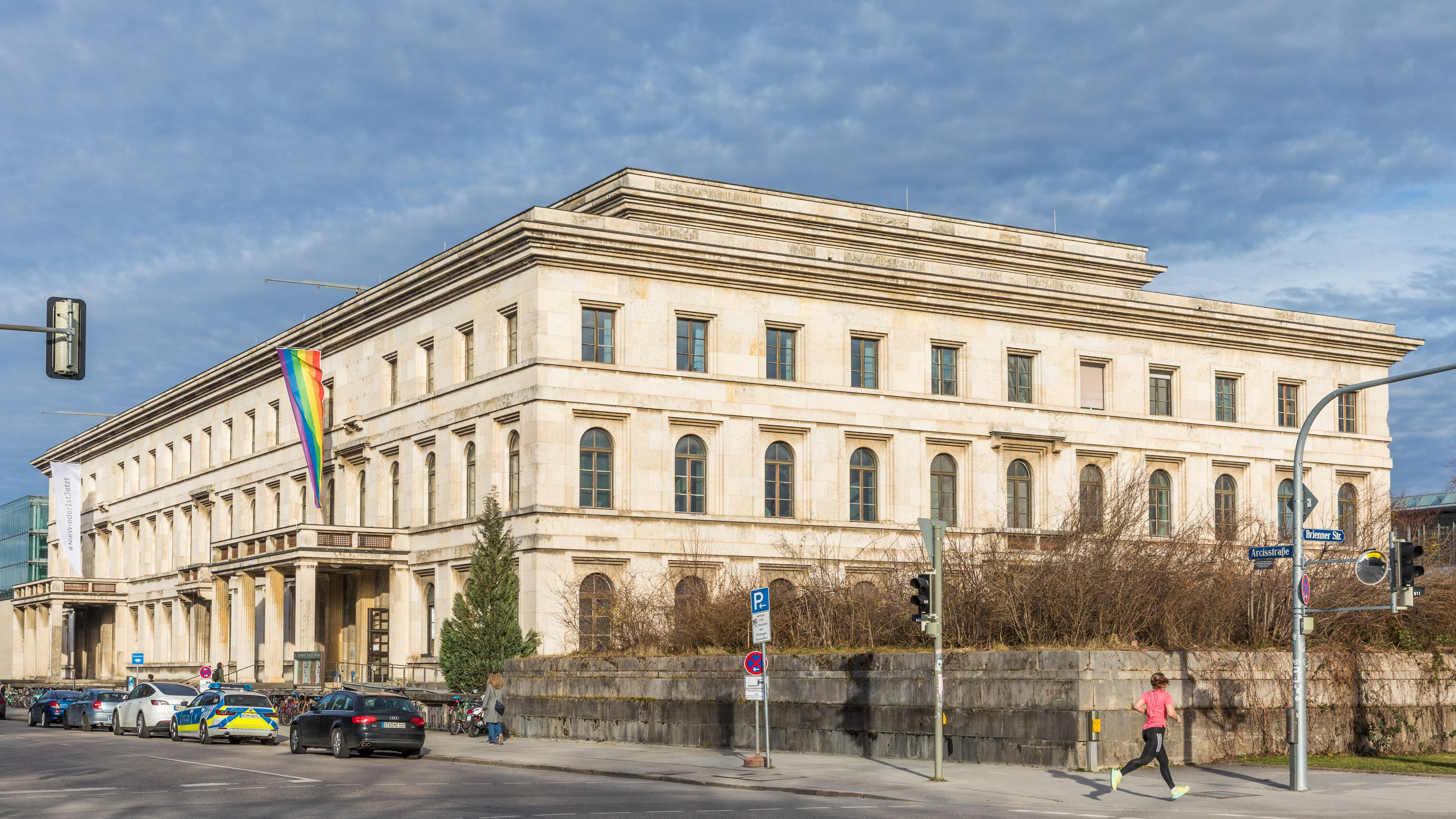
The university's main building, in the Königsplatz, Munich

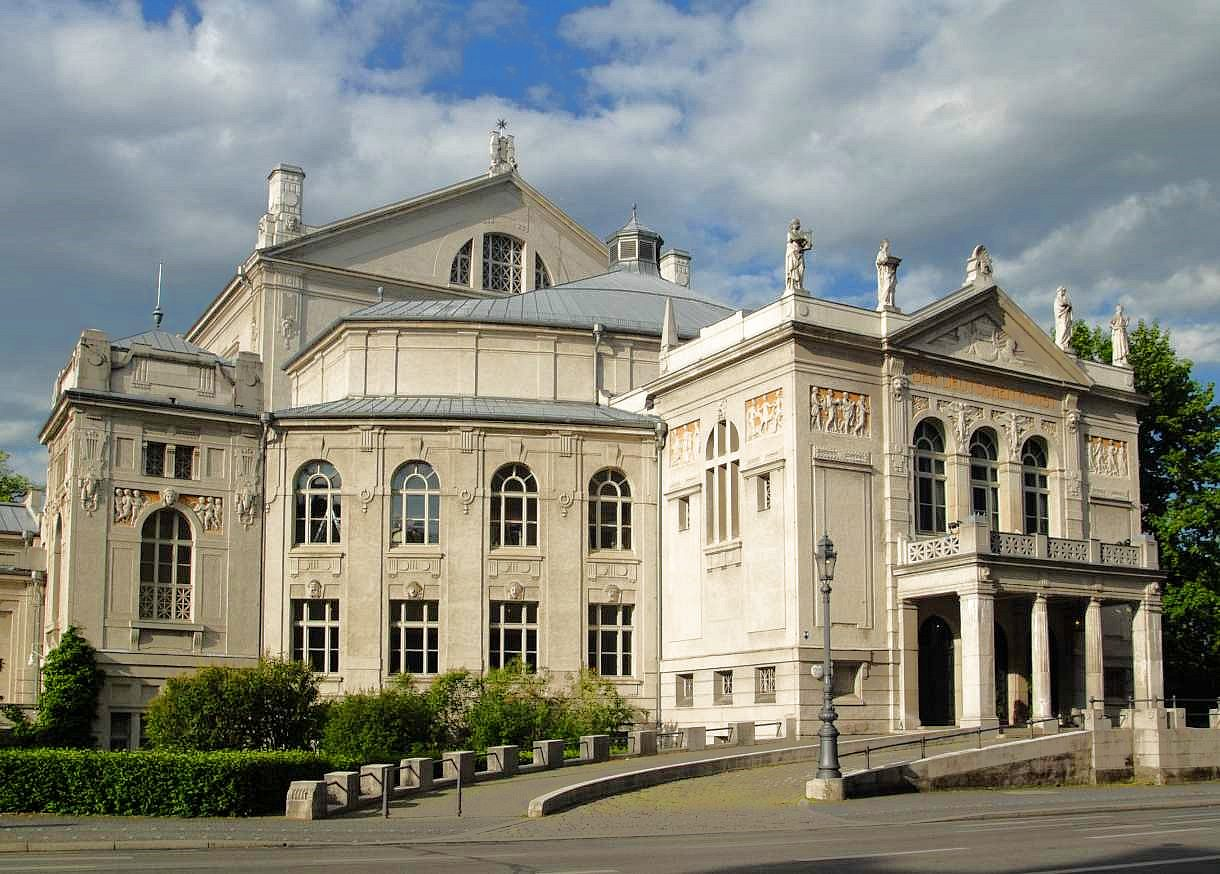
The Prinzregententheater, home of the theatre studies department

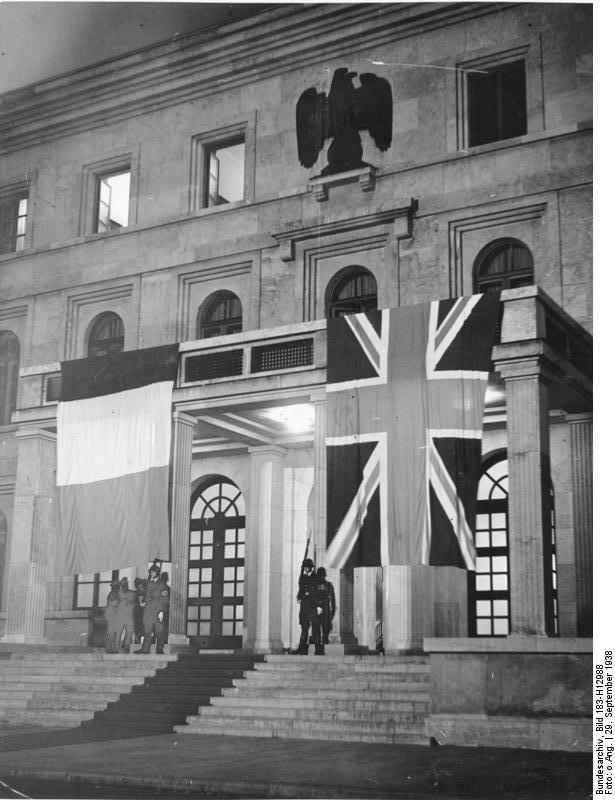
Facade of the Königsplatz building at the time of the Munich Agreement, in September 1938.

The University of Music and Theatre Munich (German: Hochschule für Musik und Theater München), also known as the Munich Conservatory, is a performing arts conservatory in Munich, Germany. The main building it currently occupies is the former Führerbau of the NSDAP, located at Arcisstraße 12, on the eastern side of the Königsplatz. Teaching and other events also take place at Luisenstraße 37a, Gasteig, the Prinzregententheater (theatre studies), and in Wilhelmstraße (ballet). Since 2008, the Richard Strauss Conservatory (de), until then independent, has formed part of the university.

== History ==
In 1846, a private institution called the Royal Conservatory of Music (Königliches Conservatorium für Musik) was founded, and in 1867, at the suggestion of Richard Wagner, this was transformed by King Ludwig II into the Royal Bavarian Music School (Königliche bayerische Musikschule), financed privately by Ludwig II until gaining the status of a state institution in 1874. It has since been renamed several times: to the Royal Academy of the Art of Music (Königliche Akademie der Tonkunst), the State Academy of Music (Staatliche Akademie der Tonkunst), the University for Music (Hochschule für Musik) and finally to the present name in 1998.

Its original location, the Odeonsgebäude, was destroyed in 1944. The current building was constructed for the Nazi party by Paul Troost and was called the Führerbau. Neville Chamberlain and Adolf Hitler signed the Munich Agreement in this building in 1938. Hitler's office, on the second floor above the main entrance, is now a rehearsal room, but has been changed little since it was built.

In 1974, the Bavarian University Act placed the Munich college, as well as all other Bavarian music colleges, on an educational par with art colleges.

== Programmes ==
The university offers study programmes in performing and teaching in all music subjects and ballet, as well as joint study programmes with the Bayerische Theaterakademie August Everding covering operatic performance, acting, directing, musicals, make-up for the theatre and lighting design.

=== Music Programs ===
HMTM offers comprehensive training in various musical disciplines:

- Instrumental Performance: Programs covering orchestral instruments, keyboard instruments, and other instrumental studies.
- Vocal Performance: Courses in solo singing, opera, and ensemble performance.
- Conducting and Composition: Studies in orchestral and choral conducting, as well as composition.
- Jazz and Popular Music: Programs focusing on jazz performance and related genres.
- Historical Performance Practice: Training in early music and period instruments.
- Church Music: Programs for both Catholic and Protestant church music traditions.
- Music Education: Degrees aimed at preparing students for teaching music in schools and other educational settings.
- Musicology: Academic study of music history, theory, and analysis.
- Arts Management and Media: Programs in cultural management, music journalism, and media studies.

These programs are structured to provide both practical performance experience and theoretical knowledge.

=== Theatre and Performance Programs ===
In collaboration with the Bayerische Theaterakademie August Everding, HMTM offers programs in:

- Acting: Training in stage and screen acting techniques.
- Directing: Courses in theatre and opera direction.
- Musical Theatre: Programs combining singing, acting, and dance.
- Stage Design and Make-up: Studies in scenography, costume design, and theatrical make-up.

These programs integrate academic coursework with practical stage experience, often in cooperation with Munich's professional theatres.

== Research ==
The University of Music and Theatre Munich (HMTM) engages in a diverse range of research activities encompassing both scholarly inquiry and artistic exploration. The institution's research endeavors are organized into several key areas, supported by dedicated institutes and collaborative projects.

=== Main Research Areas ===
- Music and Dictatorship: This area investigates the role of music under authoritarian regimes, focusing on composers affected by political oppression. The Ben-Haim Research Centre, named after composer Paul Ben-Haim, is central to this field.
- Interpretation Research: Studies in this domain analyze performance practices and the interpretative processes in music.
- Music Pedagogy and Psychology: Research here explores educational methodologies and the psychological aspects of music learning and performance.
- Music Ethnology: This field examines music within cultural and social contexts, studying diverse musical traditions. HMTM
- Musician's Medicine: Research focuses on the health and well-being of musicians, addressing physical and psychological challenges.
- Artificial Intelligence in the Cultural Sector: This area explores the integration of AI technologies in music and the arts, including creativity and production processes.
- Audiovisual Media: Studies investigate the interplay between sound and visual media, encompassing film, digital platforms, and multimedia art.

=== Research Infrastructure ===
HMTM supports its research activities through various facilities and initiatives:

- Open Music Academy (OMA): An open educational platform providing resources for music learning and teaching, promoting accessibility and innovation in music education.
- Wavelab: An innovation lab fostering interdisciplinary projects at the intersection of music, arts, and media, encouraging experimentation with new technologies.
- Collaborations: HMTM collaborates with institutions such as the Munich Center for Digital Sciences and AI (MUC.DAI) to explore the applications of machine learning in the arts.

=== Research Governance ===
The university's research activities are overseen by a dedicated Research Commission and supported by a Research Fund, ensuring the advancement of scholarly and artistic projects.

== Former and present staff ==
- Josef Rheinberger
- Max Reger composition from 1905 to 1906
- Fritz Lehmann 1953–1956
- Fritz Schieri choral conducting, composition and music theory from 1959 to 1990
- Ernst Haefliger 1971–1988 voice
- Wilhelm Killmayer 1973–1992 composition
- Diethard Hellmann 1974 choral conducting, 1981–1988 director
- Max Beckschäfer 1988–2001 composition theory
- Margarita Höhenrieder piano since 1991
- Rudi Spring since 1999 Lied interpretation
- Miku Nishimoto-Neubert, piano accompaniment since 2002
- Siegfried Mauser, Rektor 2003–2007; 2007–2014
- Talia Or (born 1977), singing
- Christoph Poppen since 2003 violin and chamber music
- Bernd Redmann since 2005 music theory and ear training
- Jan Müller-Wieland since 2007 composition
- Julia Fischer since 2011 violin
- Bernhard Haas since 2013 organ
- Marcus Bosch (from 2016), conducting

== Alumni ==
- Laura Aikin
- Benjamin Appl
- Valentina Babor
- Noah Bendix-Balgley
- Jason Barry-Smith
- Nélida Béjar
- Martin Bernheimer
- Winfried Bönig
- Milana Chernyavska
- Annette Dasch
- Gabriel Dessauer
- Jurgita Dronina
- Christoph von Dohnányi
- Claudia Eder
- Harold Faltermeyer
- Rafael Frühbeck de Burgos
- Mihoko Fujimura
- Ricardo Gallen
- Christian Gerhaher
- Thomas Guggeis
- Claus Guth
- Anna Handler
- Hildegard Heichele
- Gerold Huber
- Nicolaus A. Huber
- Anna Korsun
- Horst Laubenthal
- Elisabeth Lindermeier
- Nick McCarthy
- Gerhard Merkl
- Nils Mönkemeyer
- Carl Orff
- Helga Pogatschar
- Bernd Purkrabek
- Bernd Redmann
- Pichu Sambamoorthi
- Hanns-Martin Schneidt
- Kirill Troussov
- Jörg Widmann
- Heinz Winbeck
- Carl Valentin Wunderle
- Karl Maria Zwißler
- Jonas Kaufmann

== Honorary doctorates ==
- Hans Werner Henze 2004
- Robert Münster
- Gernot Gruber 2011

== See also ==
- Nazi architecture
- Music schools in Germany
