= Gerhard Merkl =

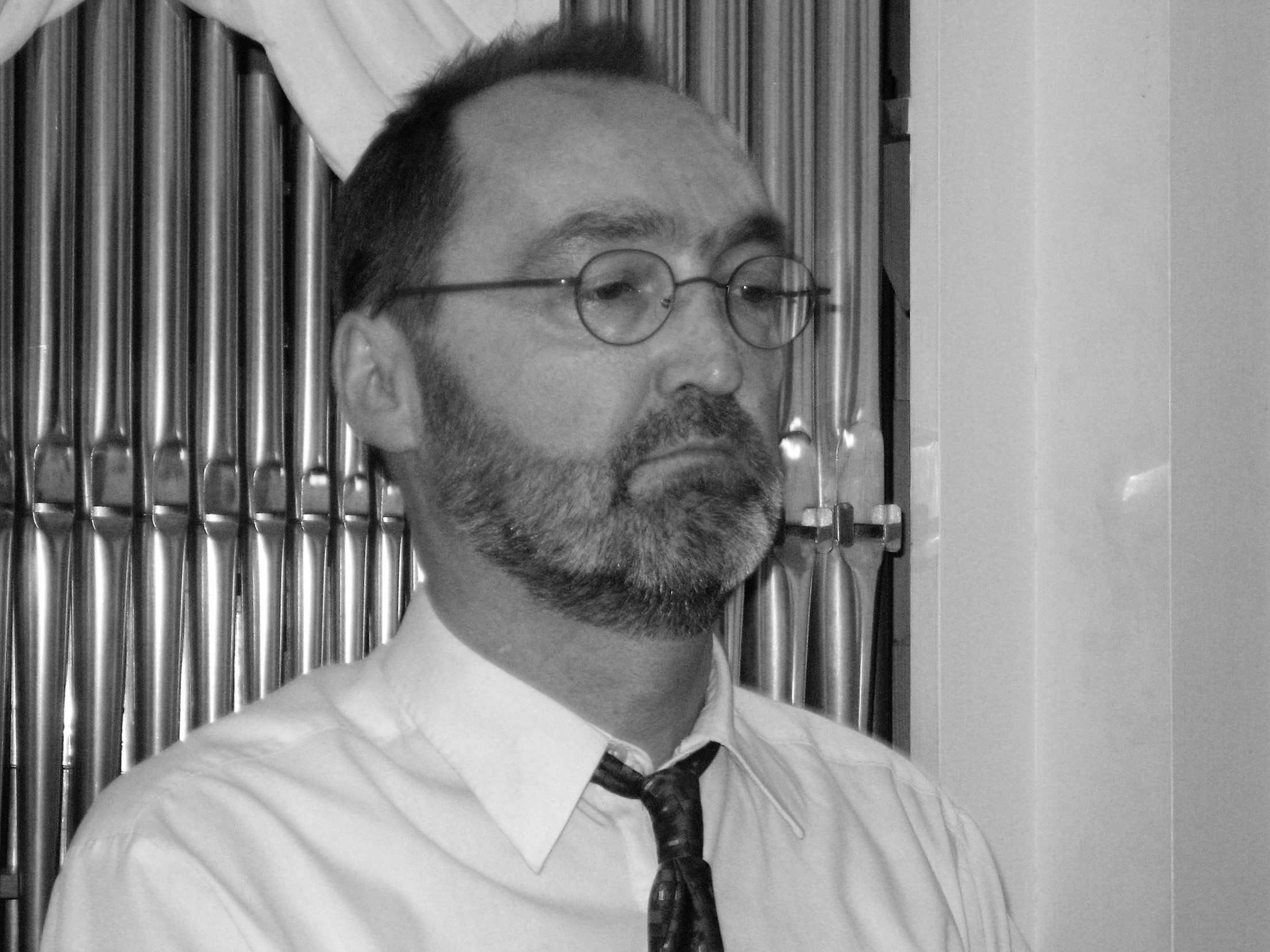
Gerhard Merkl

Gerhard Merkl (28 February 1961 – 23 January 2016) was the Domkapellmeister at the St. Stephen's Cathedral in Passau from 2000 until 2016.

Merkl was born in Wallerstein, Bavaria. After he finished school, he studied Roman Catholic church music from 1980 till 1984 at the Hochschule für Musik und Theater München. His teacher was Fritz Schieri. After his study he worked as a choirmaster in Munich also for choirs like the "Laimer Kammerchor München" and leader and docent for several musical events.

In 2000, Merkl moved to Passau to work as Domkapellmeister there. In this time he made himself a name as a conductor, teacher and composer. His greatest work is the „Passauer Pastoralmesse“, with several influences of well-known German Christmas carols.

At the beginning of 2016, he died in a hospital in Munich due to a long-term disease.
