= Volker Wangenheim =

German musician

- Born: 1 July 1928; Berlin, Germany
- Died: 23 April 2014 (aged 85); Altenkirchen, Germany
- Education: Universität der Künste Berlin
- Occupations: Conductor; Composer; Academic teacher
- Organizations: Orchester der Beethovenhalle; Bundesjugendorchester; Hochschule für Musik Köln; Musikhochschule Saarbrücken; Deutscher Musikrat
- Awards: Berliner Kunstpreis; Order of Merit of the Federal Republic of Germany; State Order of Merit for Polish Culture

Volker Wangenheim (1 July 1928 – 23 April 2014) was a German conductor, composer and academic teacher. He was conductor of the orchestra in Bonn from 1957, shaping the orchestra and opening the new concert hall Beethovenhalle in 1959 after which the orchestra was named from 1963. He was also co-founder and conductor of the Bundesjugendorchester, and professor at the Musikhochschule Köln.

== Life ==
=== Berlin ===
Wangenheim grew up in Berlin where he was born and studied violin, oboe, piano, composition and conducting at the Universität der Künste Berlin. From 1951 to 1952, he was repetiteur and Kapellmeister at the Mecklenburg State Theatre in Schwerin. In 1952, he founded the Berliner Mozart-Orchester, which he headed to 1959. From 1954 to 1957 he also conducted the Akademisches Orchester Berlin. He made his debut with the Berlin Philharmonic on 22 June 1954.

=== Bonn ===
In 1957, Wangenheim became conductor of the Städtisches Orchester (municipal orchestra) in Bonn, the provisional capital of Germany. His first duty was conducting a concert to celebrate the orchestra's 50th anniversary. Concerts of the orchestra of then 59 players took place in the Bürgerhaus and the auditorium of the university. The concert hall Beethovenhalle was still under construction. He conducted the concert for its opening in 1959, when the new hall was regarded as the best concert hall in Germany.

He was officially Generalmusikdirektor in Bonn from 1963, when the orchestra was renamed to Orchester der Beethovenhalle. The orchestra retained that name until 2003 when it became the Beethoven Orchester Bonn. In 1964, he toured with the orchestra to the Salzburg Festival, and in 1966 to the Wiener Festwochen, promoting international recognition also by a tour to Japan. Wangenheim conducted the world premiere of Stockhausen's Fresco für vier Orchestergruppen on 15 November 1969. It was part of an all-day event playing Stockhausen's music for which Wangenheim provided the hall and the orchestra. He retired from the post in 1978, having built the orchestra in quality and size, to then 99 players. From 1957 to 1979, he was also artistic director of the Philharmonischer Chor Bonn.

In 1969, he was one of the founders of the Bundesjugendorchester, the national youth orchestra which he shaped built as first the only conductor, with more than 160 concerts beginning on 3 August 1969 and ending in January 1984.

In 1972, he was appointed professor at the Musikhochschule Köln and head of the conductors' class, with students including Markus Stenz. He was a member of the board of the Deutscher Musikrat from 1972 to 1980, and then an honorary member.

Wangenheim and his wife Brigitte spent their retirement in Altenkirchen in the Westerwald, where he died at the age of 85.

== Work ==
Wangenheim composed symphonies, chamber music, church music and Volkslied-motets. Some of his choral works were premiered by the MendelssohnKammerChor Berlin conducted by his student Volkher Häusler.

His main focus was on compositions of sacred choral music without instrumental accompaniment and in Latin, which he was inspired to do in his Berlin youth while listening to Gregorian chants in a Catholic church. Wangenheim contributed the choral setting of the Easter hymn "Das ist der Tag, den Gott gemacht" to the 2013 edition of the Gotteslob hymnal.

== Awards ==
- Berliner Kunstpreis (1954)
- Order of Merit of the Federal Republic of Germany (1972)
- State Order of Merit for Polish Culture (1978)
