= Ursula Ragwitz =

German politician (1928–2020)

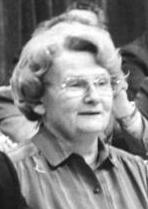

Head of the Culture Department of the Central Committee
- In office 18 November 1975 – 14 November 1989; Acting: 18 November 1975 – 17 March 1976
- Secretary: Kurt Hager
- Deputy: Rudolf Raupach; Franz Hentschel
- Preceded by: Peter Heldt
- Succeeded by: Lothar Bisky

Personal details
- Born: Ursula Rose; 15 February 1928 Cottbus, Province of Brandenburg, Free State of Prussia, Weimar Republic (now Brandenburg, Germany)
- Died: 2020
- Party: Socialist Unity Party (1946–1989)
- Spouse: Erhard Ragwitz
- Occupation: Politician; Party Functionary
- Central institution membership: 1981–1989: Full member, Central Committee; Other offices held: 1973–1975: Deputy Head, Culture Department of the Central Committee

Ursula Ragwitz (born Ursula Rose; 15 February 1928 – 2020) was a senior official of the ruling East German Socialist Unity Party. She started her career as a primary school teacher, and rose to become a member of the powerful Party Central Committee between 1981 and 1989, undertaking various leadership roles in respect of the country's highly politicised culture sector.

== Life ==
Ursula Rose was born in Cottbus, historically the cultural centre of Germany's Sorbian ethnic minority. Her father worked as a driver. Between 1942 and 1945 she studied to become a teacher of German and music at the teacher training college in Exin (Kreis Bromberg), in a part of Germany that had been in Poland between 1920 and 1939, and would be transferred back to Poland in 1945. At the end of the war she moved back west as far as Spreewald where she was briefly employed as a probationary teacher at a small village school. From 1946 until 1951 she taught at a primary school in her birth city of Cottbus, since 1945 administered as part of the Soviet occupation zone.

In April 1946 the contentious merger took place, in that part of what had been Germany now under Soviet administration, between the Communist Party and the more moderate SPD. This provided a foundation for a new political order, creating the Socialist Unity Party which, like thousands of her fellow citizens, she lost no time in joining. In October 1949 the Soviet occupation zone was relaunched as the Soviet sponsored German Democratic Republic, a new form of German single party dictatorship, with the Socialist Unity Party ("Sozialistische Einheitspartei Deutschlands" / SED), now effectively purged of former Social Democrats, installed as the new ruling party. Between 1951 and 1952 she taught at the Teacher Training Institute ("Institut für Lehrerbildung" / IfL) in Cottbus.

It is not clear at what date Ursula Rose married the composer Erhard Ragwitz, but available sources concerned with her political career use her married name, identifying her as Ursula Ragwitz. In 1953 she founded the music school in Cottbus, becoming its first director, at the same time becoming head of culture with the district council. From May/June 1954 she became a department head with the regional arts commission. After this she served successively as assistant, senior assistant and then lecturer at the Dresden Music Conservatory. After that, until 1963 she served as Director of the Hoyerswerda Music Academy. Between 1963 and 1969 she was the deputy chair of the Cottbus regional council for Culture, Well-bring and Sport. During this period, in 1967, she undertook a further training course for senior culture officers at the party central committee's Academy for Social Sciences in Berlin. Directly after that, in 1968 she became a member of the national executive of the Association of Presentation Arts ("Verband der darstellenden Künstler" / VdK).

Ragwitz switched to the national level in 1969 when she became a political assistant in the Culture Department of the Central Committee. Promotion followed in 1973 when she became deputy department head, and again in November 1975 when she took over as acting director. Finally, in March 1976, she took over as head of the Culture Department from Peter Heidt who moved on to an academic function as a Professor for Economic History at the party's Karl Marx Academy. There had been five Culture Department heads since 1957, but she would remain in the post until 1989. She also headed up the Politburo's Culture Commission between 1976 and 1989, and occupied various other positions of influence in the arts and media sector.

Ragwitz's position in charge of the Cultural Department gave Ragwitz considerable influence over cultural life and work in the German Democratic Republic and also, some contended, over authors in West Germany. The party's monopoly of various forms of patronage and sponsorship gave her the power to affect the material well-being of East German authors, such as, for instance, Stephan Hermlin. On top of that she was also given charge, by Central Committee Secretary Kurt Hager, of determining approval processes for foreign travel and performances by artists and she was given co-responsibility for the conditions under which the hugely popular books of Karl May (1842–1912) might be both published and produced as films.

Between 1981 and 3 December 1989 Ragwitz was herself a member of the Party Central Committee, which became of the leading role afforded the party under the Leninist structure built into the East German constitution placed her at the heart of the country's power apparatus.

After the demise of the German Democratic Republic Ragwitz lived with her husband as a pensioner in Berlin.

== Awards and honours (not a complete list) ==
- 1980 Banner of Labor
- 1981 For People and Fatherland merit award
- 1985 Patriotic Order of Merit
- 1988 Patriotic Order of Merit Gold clasp
- 1988 Honorary Doctorate Martin Luther University of Halle-Wittenberg
