= Iphigenia in Aulis (Graun) =

Opera by Carl Heinrich Graun

Iphigenia in Aulis is a German opera by Carl Heinrich Graun to a libretto by Leopold Villati premiered 1728, then 1731 at the Gänsemarkt opera Hamburg. Johann Georg Sulzer declared the opera an example of Handel and Graun attaining the sublime.

Graun returned to the same subject two decades later for his Ifigenia in Aulide (3 acts, 1748)

== Recordings ==
- complete - Matthias Dähling, Andreas Heinemeyer, Santa Karnite, Mirko Ludwig, Genevieve Tschumi, Dominik Wörner, Hanna Zumsande, barockwerk hamburg, Ira Hochman 2CD CPO recorded 2021 released 2023
