= MendelssohnKammerChor =

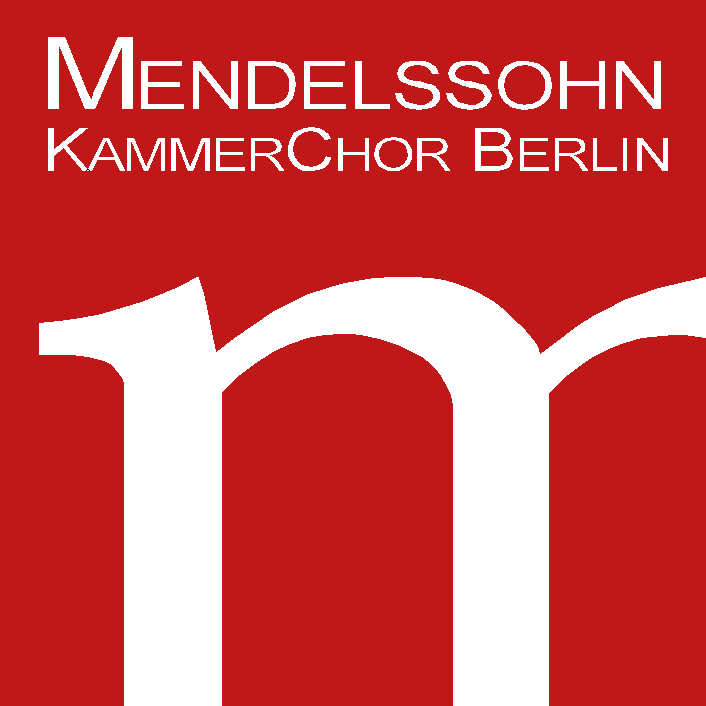
Logo of the MendelssohnKammerChor Berlin

The MendelssohnKammerChor Berlin (English: MendelssohnChamberChoir Berlin) was named in September 2006 by Volkher Häusler, who had founded the choir in 1986 as Kreuzberger Kantorei. It is a semi-professional mixed choir which is located in Berlin. Volkher Häusler is its artistic director.

The repertoire ranges from early music to 20th-century classical music. Emphasis is made to the vocal music of the members of the Mendelssohn family, Fanny Hensel, Felix Mendelssohn Bartholdy and Arnold Mendelssohn.

The MendelssohnKammerChor Berlin was involved in many commercial audio recordings for broadcasting, film und recording media and is member of the Chorverband Berlin (English: Choir Association of Berlin). The choir performs regularly in the chamber music hall of the Berliner Philharmonie and has performed several world premieres of the German composer Volker Wangenheim. The choir also contributes to theatre projects, for example with artists such as Helge Leiberg. The choir mainly gives concerts in the Berlin-Brandenburg area, but also has made concert tours to foreign countries.

The German pharmacologist Bruno Müller-Oerlinghausen is patron of the choir.
