= Heinrich Werlé =

German musician and music critic

Heinrich Werlé (2 May 1887 – 26 May 1955) was a German choir director, organist and music critic.

== Life ==
Born in Bensheim, Werlé, son of a civil servant, was first a music teacher at a school in Leipzig, and from 1926 in the rank of a study council. From 1928 to 1945 he taught music at the Pädagogisches Institut of the Leipzig University.

In 1933 he joined the NSDAP and was registered with effect from 1 May 1933 under the membership number 2,989,562. He was also a member of the National Socialist Teachers League and the National Socialist German Lecturers League. Beside his teaching activity he took over the direction of the chamber choir of the NS-Rundfunkgruppe Gau Sachsen and the Abteilung choir- und Volksmusik in the NS-Rundfunkgruppe at the Mitteldeutscher Rundfunk. In his contribution Zur Lage der Volksmusik im Rundfunk in the Leipzig magazine Volk im Werden, he described the Weimar Republic as a "period of liberalism lying behind us", which "out of inertial bourgeois comfort even in the popular has mixed so much foreign, false and hypocritical things with each other and intermingled them with each other, that first of all must be cleared away. Only what is true to life and close to the people finds its way directly to the Germans [...] The prerequisites for another are not based on a new aesthetic, but rest in the moral strength of responsibility-conscious National Socialism."

From 1937 to 1943 Werlé was main editor of the magazine for folk music Gut Ton in Dresden.

After the Second World War he worked from 1946 as professor at the Martin-Luther-University Halle-Wittenberg. In the same year he founded the MDR Rundfunkchor Leipzig, which he took over. In 1953 he obtained his doctorate at the University of Jena with a thesis on Musik im Leben des Kindes.

Among his students was church musician Johannes Petzold.

Werlé died in Leipzig at age 68.

== Work ==
- Methodik des Musikunterrichts auf der Grundstufe. Kistner & Siegel, Leipzig 1930.
- Volksmusik im Rundfunk. Hesse, Berlin 1932.
- Der Männerchor-Dirigent im Volkslied. Kistner & Siegel, Leipzig 1932.
- Franz Schubert. Der Mensch und sein Werk. Eher, Berlin 1941.
- Franz Schubert in seinen Briefen und Aufzeichnungen. S. Hirzel, Leipzig 1948.
- Musik im Leben des Kindes. Ehlermann, Dresden 1949.
