= Polydorus (Graun) =

1726 opera by Carl Heinrich Graun

Polydorus is an opera in five acts by Carl Heinrich Graun to a libretto by Johann Samuel Müller, premiered 1726, later performed 1735 at the Gänsemarkt opera Hamburg. It was Graun's first opera and met with great success.

== Cast ==
- Ilione soprano
- Andromache soprano
- Polydorus alto
- Deiphilus tenor
- Polymnestor bass
- Pyrrhus bass
- Dares bass

== Recordings ==
- complete - Hanna Zumsande, Santa Karnite, Alon Harari, Mirko Ludwig, Fabian Kuhnen, barockwerk hamburg, Ira Hochman 2CD CPO recorded 2018 released 2020
