= Bernd Purkrabek =

Bernd Purkrabek (born 1982) is an Austrian lighting designer working at major opera houses.

Purkrabek first received a polytechnic degree in Graz, then studied audio-visual media and photography. From 2004 to 2006 he worked as lighting technician for several film productions. Thereafter he went to Munich to study light design at the Hochschule für Musik und Theater München (University of Music and Performing Arts). He trained his skills as an assistant to Reinhard Traub and Asa Frankenberg before starting to work on his own in 2009. Since then he has worked for major opera houses such as Deutsche Oper Berlin, Royal Swedish Opera, De Nederlandse Opera, Grand Théâtre de Genève and Teatro Real in Madrid, as well as at the Glyndebourne Festival. Since 2009 he is continuously working at Theater an der Wien.

== Opera productions at the Theater an der Wien ==
- 2009: Der Prinz von Homburg (Henze), director: Christof Loy
- 2011: Castor et Pollux (Rameau), director: Mariame Clément
- 2011: Rodelinda (Handel), director: Philipp Harnoncourt (Nikolaus Harnoncourt's son)
- 2012: Il ritorno d'Ulisse in patria (Monteverdi), director: Claus Guth
- 2013: Lazarus, D 689 (Oratorio fragments by Schubert), director: Claus Guth

== Films (selection) ==
- Hotel (2004)
- Antares (2004)
- Bridget Jones: The Edge of Reason (2004)
- Henry Dunant, du rouge sur la croix (2006)
