= Johann Gottlieb Graun =

German composer and violinist (1702 - 1771)

Johann Gottlieb Graun (1702/1703 – 27 October 1771) was a German Baroque/Classical era composer and violinist, born in Wahrenbrück. His brother Carl Heinrich was a singer and also a composer, and is the better known of the two.

Johann Gottlieb studied with J.G. Pisendel in Dresden and Giuseppe Tartini in Padua. Appointed Konzertmeister in Merseburg in 1726, he taught the violin to J.S. Bach's son Wilhelm Friedemann. He joined the court of the Prussian crown prince (the future Frederick the Great) in 1732. Graun was later made Konzertmeister of the Berlin Opera in 1740. He composed over 50 songs and compositions.

Graun's compositions were highly respected, and continued to be performed after his death: "The concert-master, John Gottlib Graun, brother to the opera-composer, his admirers say, 'was one of the greatest performers on the violin of his time, and most assuredly, a composer of the first rank'," wrote Charles Burney. He was primarily known for his instrumental works, though he also wrote vocal music and operas. He wrote a large number of violin concertos, trio sonatas, and solo sonatas for violin with cembalo, as well as two string quartets — among the earliest attempts in this genre. He also wrote many concertos for viola da gamba, which were very virtuosic, and were played by Ludwig Christian Hesse, considered the leading gambist of the time. Despite these achievements, Graun’s reputation during his lifetime was by no means commensurate with the significance of his work. Overshadowed by the fame of his younger brother Carl Heinrich Graun and by that of his pupil Franz Benda, his contributions were long underestimated and, in many cases, largely overlooked. Only in more recent scholarship has a reassessment begun to take shape. In particular, studies have demonstrated that as early as the 1730s Graun developed a stylistic model for the violin concerto that proved influential and normative for subsequent composers. This growing recognition has led to a more nuanced understanding of Graun’s role in the formation of mid-18th-century instrumental style and has gradually restored his position as a central figure in the history of German violin music.

Despite the popularity of his works, Graun was not free from criticism. Burney noted that some critics complained that, "In his concertos and church music ... the length of each movement is more immoderate than Christian patience can endure."

== Selected recordings ==
- Concerti & Sinfonie Wiener Akademie, dir. Martin Haselböck cpo
