= Gert Frischmuth =

German choral conductor and music educator

Gert Frischmuth (18 July 1932 – 4 May 2012) was a German choral conductor and music educator.

== Life ==
Born in Jena, Frischmuth studied music education at the Friedrich Schiller University of Jena. After twelve years of teaching at the Humboldt-Oberschule in Erfurt, he was appointed to the Hochschule für Musik Franz Liszt, Weimar for the subject of choral singing/choral conducting after additional studies in choral conducting. There he successfully directed, among other things, the chamber choir of the conservatoire, which won several awards. In 1979, he was appointed a Professor. In 1988, after twelve years as guest conductor and two years as interim leader, he was appointed choir director of the Leipzig Radio Choir, later to become the MDR Rundfunkchor. He led the choir until 1998, and under his direction it developed into one of the top choirs in Europe. He also conducted the Erfurt Male Choir for over forty years and, in 1998 and 1999, the Landesjugendchor Thüringen.

Frischmuth died in Erfurt at the age of 79.

Students

- Volkher Häusler, Conductor and choirmaster
- Hubert Hoche, Conductor and composer
- Markus Teutschbein, Conductor and choirmaster
- Christian Frank, Conductor and composer

== Awards ==
- Two 1st prizes as choral conductor at the singing competition of the Erfurt district at Wartburg
- Kulturpreis der Stadt Erfurt 2003
