= Janet Williams (soprano) =

American soprano

Janet Williams (born 1965) is an American soprano who has won international critical acclaim for performances at the Metropolitan Opera, Berlin Staatsoper, Paris Opera, Théâtre des Champs-Élysées, Opera de Lyon, Nice Opera, Théâtre Royal de la Monnaie, Opera Geneva, Frankfurt Opera, Cologne Opera, Leipzig Opera, San Francisco Opera, Washington Opera, Dallas Opera, and Michigan Opera Theatre as well as in concerts throughout Europe, North America, Canada, Israel and Japan with conductors including Vladimir Ashkenazy, Daniel Barenboim, Myung-whun Chung, Philippe Herreweghe, René Jacobs, Marek Janowski, Neeme Järvi, Raymond Leppard, Fabio Luisi, Sir Neville Marriner, Nicholas McGegan, Zubin Mehta, Kent Nagano, John Nelson, Donald Runnicles, Gerard Schwarz and Michael Tilson Thomas.

== Career ==
Williams has appeared with the Israel Philharmonic at Carnegie Hall, the Chicago Symphony, the Mostly Mozart Festival in New York and Tokyo, the New World Symphony, the Detroit Symphony, the New York, Los Angeles and Santa Fe Chamber Orchestras, as well as with orchestras throughout Europe in repertoire ranging from Bach and Mozart to contemporary works of living composers. Her interpretations as a recitalist have been critically acclaimed in New York, San Francisco, Washington D.C. and Detroit as well as Berlin, Paris, Tokyo, and in Iceland.

Williams' professional career began with the San Francisco Opera Center as a member of the Merola Program. She was awarded an Adler Fellowship and subsequently appeared with the company as a guest artist singing leading roles in the operas of Mozart, Puccini, Handel and Rossini. She was a member of the Berlin Staatsoper ensemble, making a critically acclaimed debut as Cleopatra in Carl Heinrich Graun's Cleopatra e Cesare. Other roles in her repertoire include Pamina in Die Zauberflöte, Konstanze and Blondchen in Die Entführung aus dem Serail, Susanna in The Marriage of Figaro, Sophie in Der Rosenkavalier, Adina in L'elisir d'amore, Ännchen in Der Freischütz, Adele in Die Fledermaus, Rosina in Il barbiere di Siviglia, Musetta in La bohème, Gilda in Rigoletto, Oscar in Un ballo in maschera, and Nannetta in Falstaff, as well as the Jungfrau in Schoenberg’s Moses und Aron and Manon in Henze's Boulevard Solitude. She is especially acclaimed for leading roles in the baroque operas of Handel, Telemann, Gassmann and Stradella at the Handel Festival in Halle, the Festwochen der Alten Musik in Innsbruck, Austria; the Spoleto Festival Italy, the Schwetzingen Festival, the Wexford Festival in Ireland and the styriarte festival in Graz.

Williams recently made her theatrical debut in Dante’s La Vita Nova in a co-production of the Berlin Renaissance Theater and the Bayer-Leverkusen Kulturhaus. She has appeared in nationally and internationally televised specials, including the Kennedy Center Honors Concert in a tribute to honoree Marilyn Horne, the PBS broadcast of the San Francisco Opera Gala co-hosted by Joan Sutherland and the ARTE film documentary L'Opera Seria. She was featured in an Oscar-winning documentary of the San Francisco Opera Chorus as Musetta in Francesca Zambello's production of La bohème. Her recordings include Brahms' Ein deutsches Requiem with the Chicago Symphony under Daniel Barenboim, Handel's Messiah with the Philharmonia Baroque Orchestra under Nicholas McGegan, Graun's Cleopatra e Cesare with the Concerto Köln Orchestra under René Jacobs and Cimarosa's Il matrimonio segreto under Gabriele Bellini.

== Academic career ==
Williams holds Bachelor degrees in both Music Education and Vocal Performance from Michigan State University and a Masters in Vocal Performance from Indiana University, where she was a student and Assistant Instructor under Professor Camilla Williams. Other instructors and mentors have included world-renowned singers Régine Crespin, Kammersängerin Helen Donath, Kammersängerin Reri Grist and noted international vocal pedagogue David Jones.

Janet Williams has worked as Guest Professor of the Hochschule für Musik Hanns Eisler in Berlin and as Interim Professor of Voice at the Hochschule für Musik and Theater in Rostock. She is currently an Honorary Professor at the Hochschule für Musik Hanns Eisler and teaches at the Lotte Lehmann Academy in Perleberg, Germany. She has presented master classes, seminars and workshops across the United States, as well as in London, Paris, Reykjavik and Berlin. Her book, Nail Your Next Audition, The Ultimate 30-Day Guide for Singers, has attracted a global following of young singers and voice professionals.

== Publications ==
- Nail Your Next Audition, The Ultimate 30-Day Guide for Singers, 2006. ISBN 978-0-9787521-0-1
- Erfolgreich vorsingen! Der 30-Tage Countdown zum Abheben, 2008. ISBN 978-0-9787521-1-8
