= Der Tod Jesu =

Oratorio libretto by Karl Wilhelm Ramler

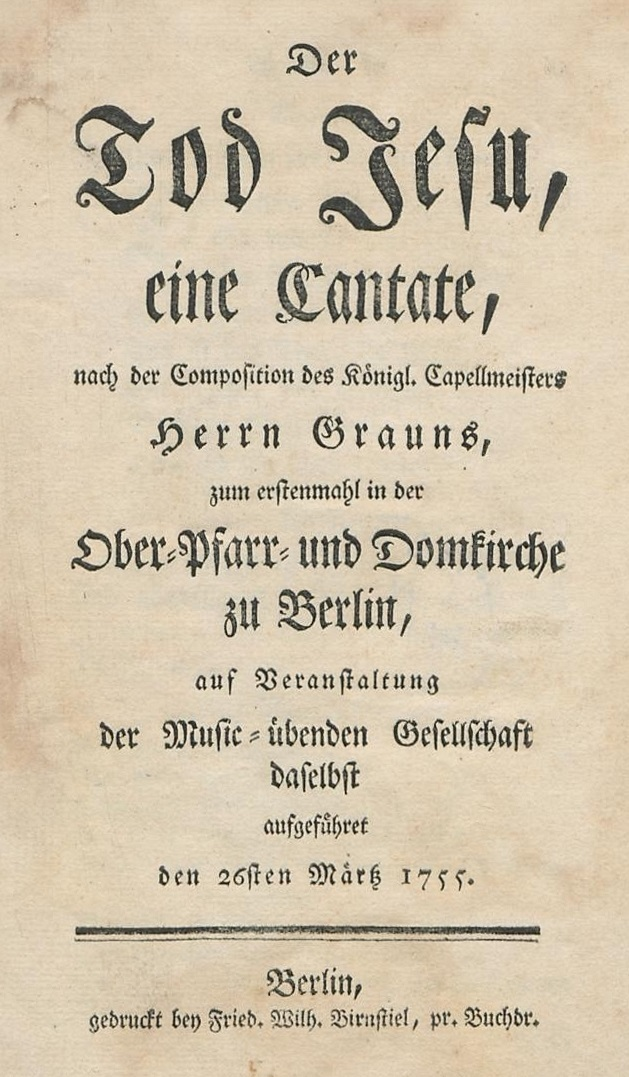
Title page of Graun's Der Tod Jesu.

Der Tod Jesu (The Death of Jesus) is an oratorio libretto by Karl Wilhelm Ramler. In its setting by Carl Heinrich Graun in 1755, it was the most often performed Passion of the 18th century in Germany.

The poem is part of the Empfindsamkeit movement of the 1750s. It is the middle of three oratorio texts by Ramler – Die Hirten bei der Krippe zu Bethlehem, Der Tod Jesu, and Die Auferstehung und Himmelfahrt – which may have been viewed by Ramler as a libretto cycle, though they were never set as a cycle by any composer. The libretto was intended for Graun but a copy of Ramler's text was somehow received by Telemann who produced his own setting of the oratorio (TWV 5:6) in Hamburg before Graun could perform the premiere in Berlin. Ramler revised his text in 1760.

The text is not a full retelling of the Passion of Christ and it does not quote Bible texts. Instead, it presents emotively various aspects of the Passion.

== Settings ==
- Georg Philipp Telemann, Hamburg 1755, TWV 5:6
- Carl Heinrich Graun, Berlin 1755 – the best known of the settings; it was performed yearly in many cities in Germany throughout the second half of the 18th century. The Australian premiere of Graun's passion cantata took place on Good Friday 2012 in St John's Cathedral in Brisbane with the Badinerie Players and the Brisbane Chamber Choir under Michael O'Loghlin and with Shelli Hulcombe (soprano), Bethany Shepherd (soprano), Gregory Massingham (tenor), Jason Barry-Smith (bass).
  - Adolf Friedrich Hesse (1809–1863) composed an Organ Introduction, Op. 84, to Graun's work.
- Johann Christoph Friedrich Bach, cantata (1769) BR D 2 / Wf XIV:1, based on Ramler's revised version from 1760
- Joseph Martin Kraus to his own libretto (1776), in the Sturm und Drang style
- Anna Amalia, Abbess of Quedlinburg, used by Johann Kirnberger as models of counterpoint in his Die Kunst des reinen Satzes in der Musik (The art of pure musical composition) (1779)
- Christian Ernst Graf (1723–1804, The Hague 1802

== Compositional style ==
Unlike Bach's Passions, Graun's setting does not imbue the tenor soloist with the role of narrator or Evangelist, nor is the bass cast as Vox Christi. The music is post-Baroque, an italianate galant style, and contains little counterpoint (notably in the duet, no. 17) or fugal movements (chorus no. 14 is a double fugue). Instead, it gives prominence to melody and voice. All arias are da capo arias with stylistic borrowings from opera arias. Grauner's recitative settings are highly expressive, culminating in the moving simplicity of the bass's recitative no. 23 on the death of Jesus, "Er ist nicht mehr!" (He is no more!). The last chorus starts quite powerfully, but then ebbs away into a mystical silence.

== Reception ==
According to Paul Steinitz, Der Tod Jesu built up an immense vogue over many years of performances on Good Friday. "It contains a good deal of imaginative music, but it was more of a Cantata based loosely on sentiments engendered by the Passion story than a liturgical Passion. It fails even to give any specific account of the trial and death of Jesus". While preparing for the Leipzig revival of Bach's St Matthew Passion in 1824, Carl Friedrich Zelter and others were concerned that a public brought up on performances of Der Tod Jesu would show a hostile reaction to the Bach revival.

== Movements ==
Graun's settings consists of 25 movements:

Part 1

1. Chorale – Du, dessen Augen flossen
2. Chorus – Sein Odem ist schwach
3. Accompanied recitative (soprano) – Gethsemane! Gethsemane!
4. Aria (soprano) – Du Held, auf den die Köcher
5. Chorale – Wen hab' ich sonst als Dich allein
6. Recitative (soprano) – Ach mein Immanuel!
7. Aria (soprano) – Ein Gebet um neue Stärke
8. Recitative (tenor) – Nun klingen Waffen
9. Aria (tenor) – Ihr weichgeschaffnen Seelen
10. Chorus – Unsre Seele ist gebeuget
11. Chorale – Ich will von meiner Missetat
12. Recitative (bass) – Jerusalem, voll Mordlust
13. Aria (bass) – So stehet ein Berg Gottes
14. Chorus – Christus hat uns ein Vorbild gelassen

Part 2

15. Chorale – Ich werde Dir zu Ehren alles wagen
16. Recitative (soprano) – Da stehet der traurige, verhängnisvolle Pfahl
17. Duet (sopranos) – Feinde, die ihr mich betrübt
18. Recitative (soprano) – Wer ist der Heilige, zum Muster uns verliehn
19. Aria (soprano) – Singt dem göttlichen Propheten
20. Chorus – Freuet euch alle ihr Frommen
21. Chorale – Wie herrlich ist die neue Welt
22. Recitative (bass) – Auf einmal fällt der aufgehaltne Schmerz
23. Accompanied recitative (bass) – Es steigen Seraphim
24. Chorale with bass solo – Ihr Augen, weint!
25. Chorus – Hier liegen wir gerührte Sünder

A performance takes about 1 3/4 hours.

== Selected recordings ==
- Telemann
  - Ex Tempore, Le Mercure Galant. conductor Florian Heyerick. René Gailly
  - Telemann Chamber Orchestra, conductor Ludger Rémy. cpo
- Graun
  - Capella Savaria, conductor Pál Németh. HM Quintana
  - La Petite Bande, conductor Sigiswald Kuijken. Hyperion Records 2003
  - Das Kleine Konzert, conductor Hermann Max, cpo 2009
- Kraus – with Kom! din herdestaf att bära, Philharmonia Chor Stuttgart, Stuttgarter Kammerorchester, Helmut Wolf. Carus-Verlag 1997
