= Ralf Popken =

German countertenor (born 1962)

Ralf Popken (born 1962) is a German countertenor. He studied choral conducting, recorder, and singing at the Hochschule für Musik und Theater in Hannover and has since performed in concerts across Europe and the USA. He has made numerous radio recordings for Norddeutscher Rundfunk, Westdeutscher Rundfunk, and Dutch and Swiss radios and is noted for singing Bach cantatas. He debuted in opera at the Staatsoper Hannover in Hannover in 1989. His performances have included the premiere of Medeamaterial by Pascal Dusapin in 1991 and a role in the musical Chicago at the Theater an der Wien and the Berlin Theater des Westens. He now teaches voice at the Hochschule für Musik und Theater. He has also conducted the NDR Chor, Vocalconsort Berlin, and ChorWerk Ruhr.
