= Winfried Bönig =

German organist

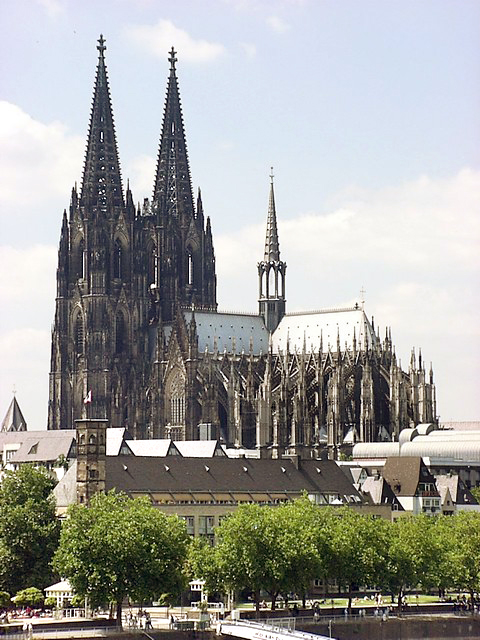
Cologne Cathedral

Winfried Bönig (born 1959 in Bamberg) is a German organist.

Bönig studied organ and church music at the Musikhochschule München with Franz Lehrndorfer from 1978 to 1984. He passed his A exam in 1982 with distinction. Afterwards he studied musicology in Augsburg (doctorate). Between 1984 and 1998 he was organist of St. Josef in Memmingen. In 1998 he was appointed professor of organ at the Hochschule für Musik in Cologne. Among his students is Ulrich Cordes. In 2001 he became organist of Cologne Cathedral.
