= Carl Heinrich Graun =

German composer and tenor (1704–1759)

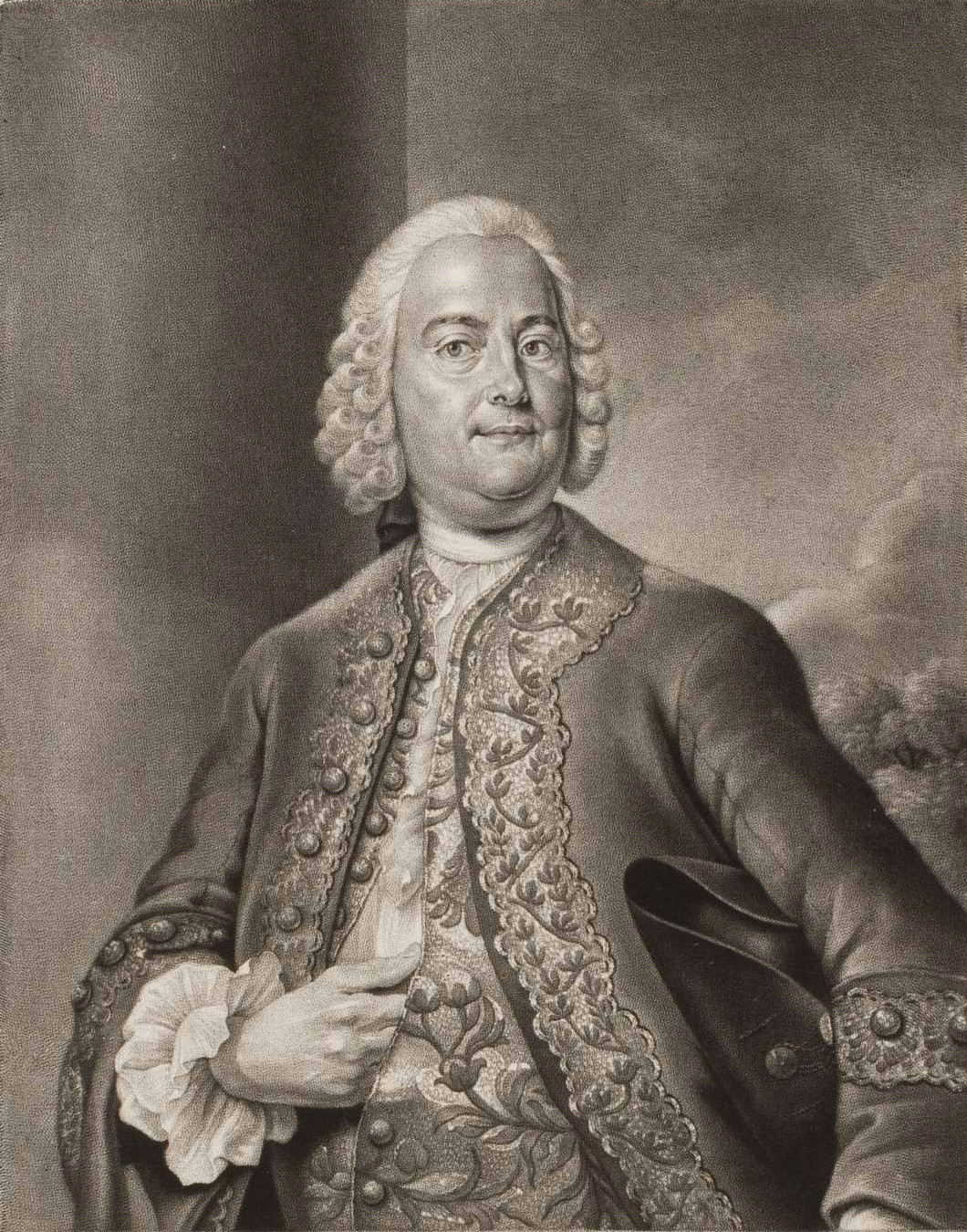
- Born: 7 May 1704; Wahrenbrück, Electorate of Saxony
- Died: 8 August 1759 (aged 55); Berlin, Kingdom of Prussia, Holy Roman Empire
- Education: Kreuzkirche, Dresden
- Occupations: Composer, tenor
- Years active: 1726–1756
- Known for: Most important German composer of Italian opera of his time, along with Johann Adolph Hasse
- Notable work: Kapellmeister to Frederick the Great
- Spouse: Two
- Children: One daughter, four sons
- Relatives: Johann Gottlieb Graun (brother)

Carl Heinrich Graun (7 May 1704 – 8 August 1759) was a German composer and tenor. Along with Johann Adolph Hasse, he is considered to be the most important German composer of Italian opera of his time.

== Biography ==
Graun was born in Wahrenbrück in the Electorate of Saxony. In 1714, he followed his brother, Johann Gottlieb Graun, to the school of the Kreuzkirche, Dresden, and sang in the Dresdner Kreuzchor and the chorus of the Opernhaus am Zwinger. He studied singing with Christian Petzold and composition with Johann Christoph Schmidt (1664–1728). In 1724, Graun moved to Braunschweig, singing at the opera house and writing six operas for the company. In 1735, Graun moved to Rheinsberg in Brandenburg, after he had written the opera Lo specchio della fedeltà for the marriage of the then crown prince Frederick (the Great) and Elisabeth Christine in Schloss Salzdahlum in 1733. He was Kapellmeister to Frederick the Great from his ascension to the throne in 1740 until Graun's death nineteen years later in Berlin.

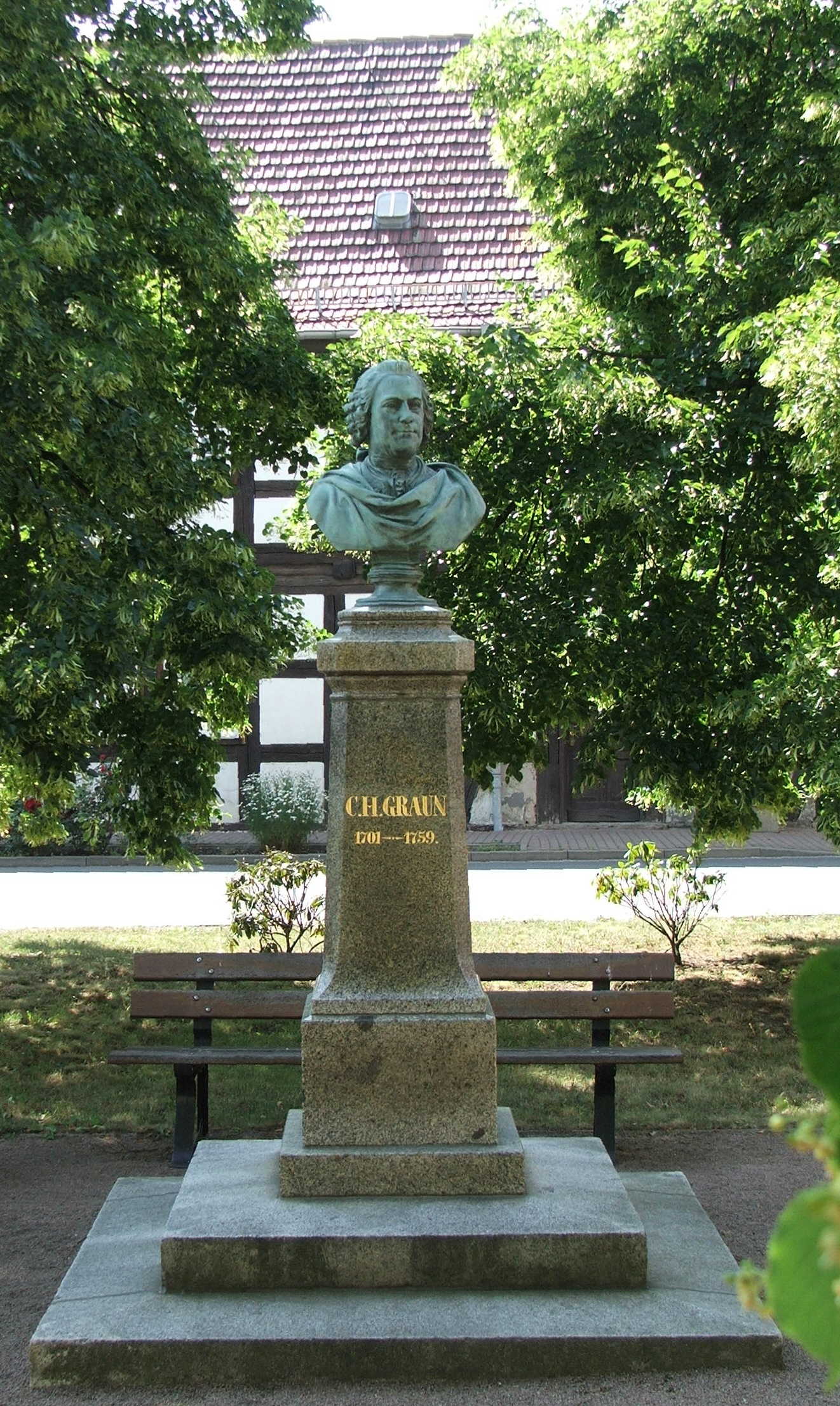
Graun memorial in Wahrenbrück

Graun wrote a number of operas. His opera Cesare e Cleopatra inaugurated the opening of the Berlin State Opera (Königliche Hofoper) in 1742. Montezuma (1755) was written to a libretto by King Frederick. His works are rarely played today, though his passion cantata Der Tod Jesu (The Death of Jesus, 1755) was frequently performed in Germany for many years after his death. This work, said Paul Steinitz, "contains a good deal of imaginative music, but it was more of a Cantata based loosely on sentiments engendered by the Passion story than a liturgical Passion. It fails even to give any specific account of the trial and death of Jesus".

His other works include concertos and trio sonatas. He was known for particularly good text-setting, probably due to his background as a vocalist.

He married twice and had a daughter, who became a singer, from his first marriage and four sons from his second. His great-great-great-great-grandson, Vladimir Nabokov, became an eminent 20th-century novelist.

== Works ==
=== Stage works ===
- Polydorus (5 acts, 1726–28)
- Iphigenia in Aulis (3 acts 1728)
- Scipio Africanus (3 acts, 1732)
- Lo specchio della fedeltà (3 acts, 1733)
- Pharao Tubaetes (5 acts, 1735)
- Rodelinda, regina de' langobardi (3 acts, 1741)
- Cesare e Cleopatra (3 acts, 1742)
- Artaserse, libretto by Metastasio (3 acts, 1743)
- Catone in Utica, libretto by Metastasio (3 acts, 1743)
- Alessandro e Poro, libretto by Metastasio (3 acts, 1744)
- Lucio Papirio (3 acts, 1744)
- Adriano in Siria, libretto by Metastasio (3 acts, 1746)
- Demofoonte, libretto by Metastasio (3 acts, 1746)
- Cajo Fabricio (3 acts, 1746)
- Le feste galanti (1747)
- Cinna (3 acts, 1748)
- L'Europa galante (1748)
- Ifigenia in Aulide (3 acts, 1748)
- Angelica e Medoro (3 acts, 1749)
- Coriolano (3 acts, 1749)
- Fetonte (3 acts, 1750)
- Il Mithridate (3 acts, 1751)
- L’Armida (3 acts, 1751)
- Britannico (3 acts, 1751)
- L'Orfeo (3 acts, 1752)
- Il giudizio di Paride (1 act, 1752)
- Silla (3 acts, 1753)
- Semiramide (3 acts, 1754)
- Montezuma (3 acts, 1755)
- Ezio, libretto by Metastasio (1755)
- I fratelli nemici (3 acts, 1756)
- La Merope (3 acts, 1756)

=== Other works ===
- Te Deum
- Ein Lämmlein geht und trägt die Schuld, Passion cantata (ca. 1730)
- Kommt her und schaut (Große Passion) (1730)
- Der Tod Jesu, Passion cantata (1755)
- Oratorium in Festum Nativitatis Christi, Christmas oratorio
- Easter Oratorium
- Six Italian Cantatas
- Concerto for Horn, Strings and Cembalo in D major
- Lieder (1743)
- Sinfonia in C major
- Concerto for Viola da gamba
- Harpsichord Concerto in C minor
- Gigue in B-flat minor
