= Berlin State Opera =

German opera house in Berlin

State Opera Unter den Linden
- Staatsoper Unter den Linden
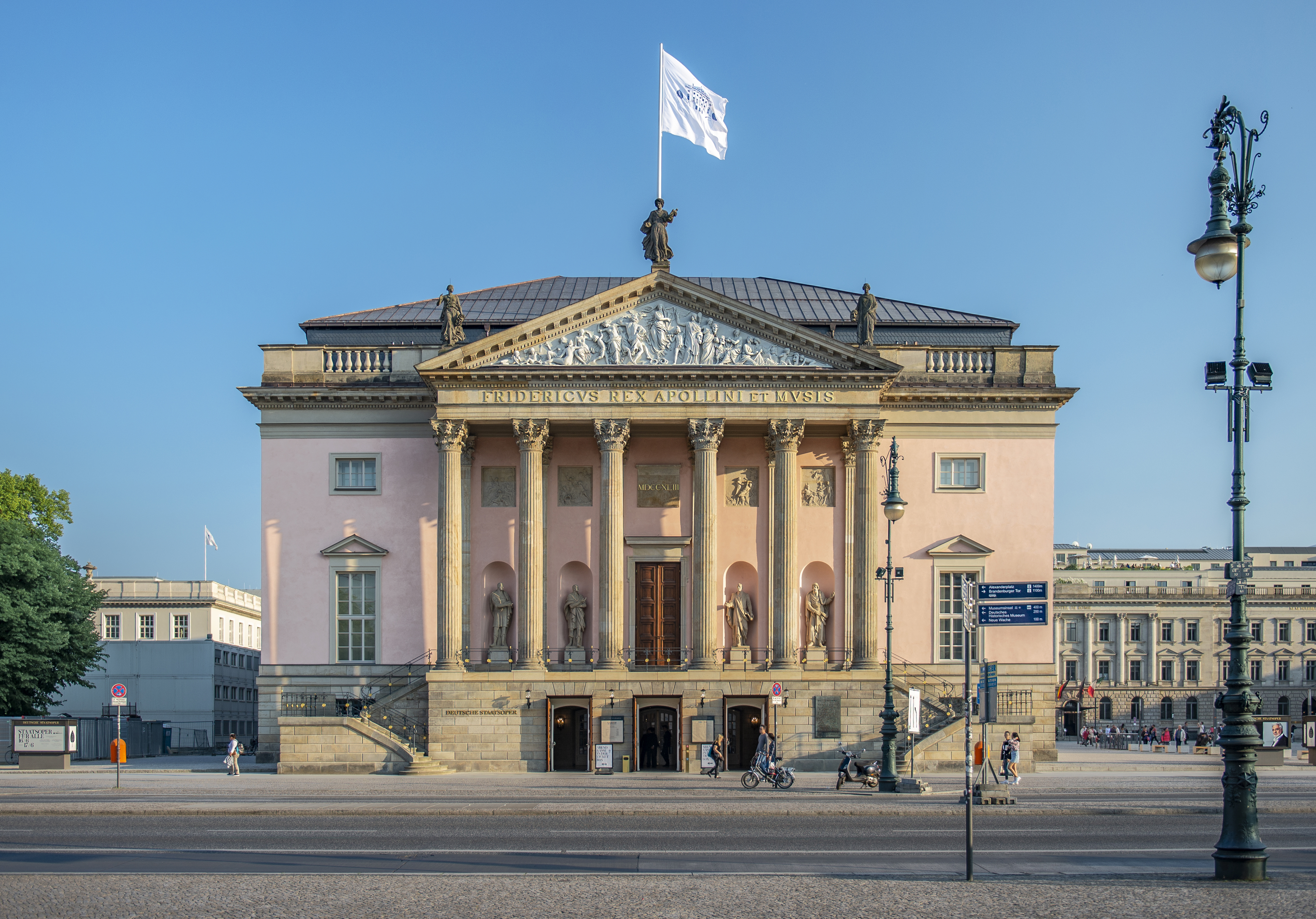
- Named after: Unter den Linden boulevard
- Formation: 1743; 283 years ago
- Location: Berlin, Germany
- Coordinates: 52°31′00″N 13°23′41″E
- Intendant: Elisabeth Sobotka
- General Music Director: Christian Thielemann
- Website: staatsoper-berlin.de
- Building details

Other information
- Seating capacity: 1,350

The Staatsoper Unter den Linden, also known as the Berlin State Opera (German: Staatsoper Berlin), is a listed building on Unter den Linden boulevard in the historic center of Berlin, Germany. Initially called the Königliche Oper (Royal Opera) or Berlin Hofoper (English: Berlin Court Opera), the opera house was built by order of Prussian king Frederick the Great from 1741 to 1743 according to plans by Georg Wenzeslaus von Knobelsdorff in the Palladian style. Damaged during the Allied bombing in World War II, the former Royal Prussian Opera House was rebuilt from 1951 to 1955 as part of the Forum Fridericianum square in East Berlin.

Nicknamed Lindenoper, it is "the world's oldest state opera" and "the first theater anywhere to be, by itself, a prominent, freestanding monumental building in a city."

== History ==
=== Names ===
Originally called the Königliche Oper ('Royal Opera'), the company was renamed the Preußische Staatsoper ('Prussian State Opera') in 1919. After World War II it began operating as the national opera company for Communist East Germany, taking the name Deutsche Staatsoper ('German State Opera') in 1955.

In the West and colloquially, however, people used the name Staatsoper Unter den Linden ('State Opera Unter den Linden') after the boulevard on which the theatre sits. This usage became more common after the collapse of East Germany in 1990, but, contrary to the company's website, it was not officially adopted until 1995 and the old name still appeared on new recordings issued by the company as late as the following year.

=== Early years ===
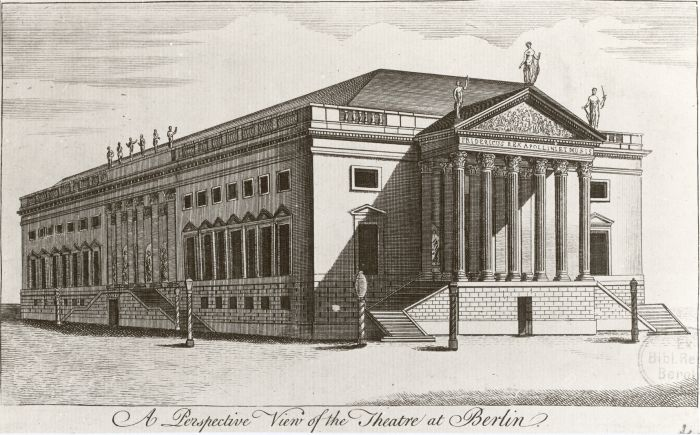
The Court Opera, c. 1745

King Frederick II of Prussia, shortly after his accession to the throne, commissioned the original building on the site. Though architecturally significant as an early example of the Palladian revival in Germany, the north and west façades are direct copies of Colen Campbell's elevations at Stourhead and Wanstead respectively. Construction work began in July 1741, with what was designed by Georg Wenzeslaus von Knobelsdorff to be the first part of a "Forum Fredericianum" on present-day Bebelplatz. Although not entirely completed, the Court Opera (Hofoper) was inaugurated with a performance of Carl Heinrich Graun's Cesare e Cleopatra on 7 December 1742. This event marked the beginning of the successful, 250-year co-operation between the Staatsoper and the Staatskapelle Berlin, the state orchestra, whose roots trace back to the 16th century.

In 1821, the Berlin Opera—hosted at the Schauspielhaus Berlin—gave the premiere of Weber's Der Freischütz. In 1842, Wilhelm Taubert instituted the tradition of regular symphonic concerts. In the same year, Giacomo Meyerbeer succeeded Gaspare Spontini as general music director. Felix Mendelssohn also conducted symphonic concerts for a year.

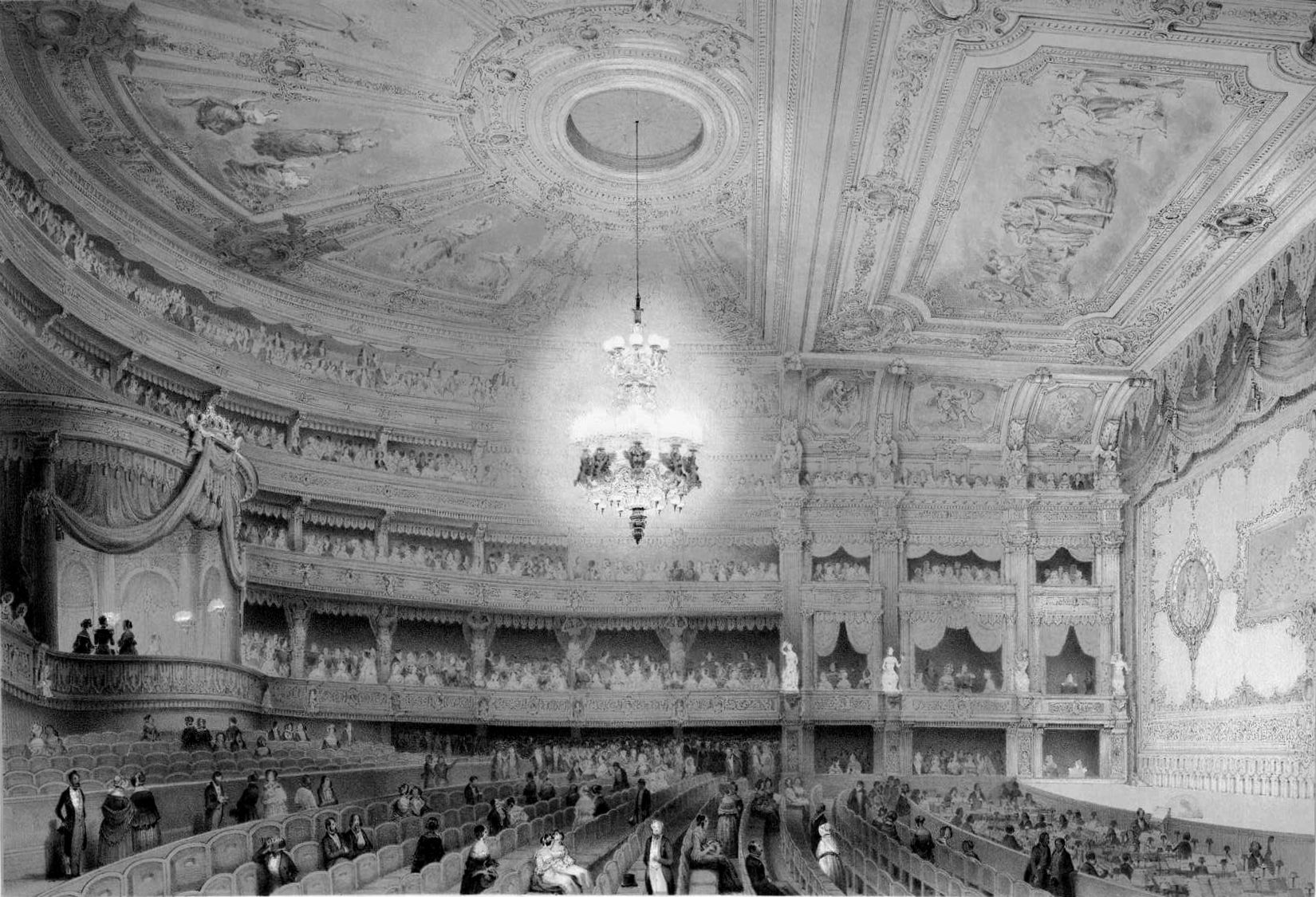
Interior, rebuilt after the fire in 1843

On 18 August 1843 the Linden Opera was destroyed by fire. The reconstruction of the building was supervised by architect Carl Ferdinand Langhans, and the Königliches Opernhaus (Royal Opera House) was inaugurated the following autumn by a performance of Meyerbeer's Ein Feldlager in Schlesien. In 1849, Otto Nicolai's Die lustigen Weiber von Windsor was premiered at the Royal Opera House, conducted by the composer.

=== 20th century ===
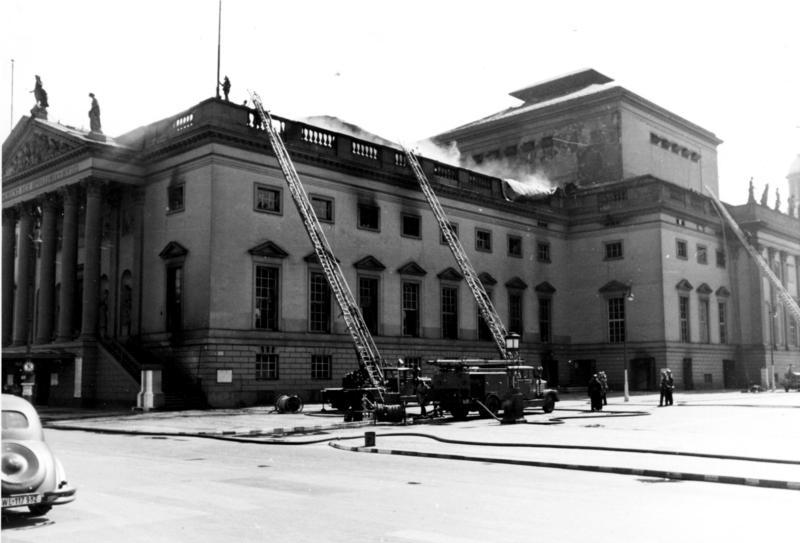
10 April 1941, the morning after the bombing that destroyed the opera house

At the end of the 19th century and the beginning of the 20th century, the Royal Court Opera, Berlin, attracted many illustrious conductors. They included Felix von Weingartner, Karl Muck, Richard Strauss, Leo Blech and George Szell. After the collapse of the German Empire in 1918, the Opera was renamed Staatsoper Unter den Linden and the Königliche Kapelle became Kapelle der Staatsoper.

In the 1920s, Kurt Adler, Wilhelm Furtwängler, Erich Kleiber, Otto Klemperer, Alexander von Zemlinsky, Bruno Walter occupied the conductor's post. In 1925, Alban Berg's Wozzeck, was given its premiere in a production conducted by Erich Kleiber in the composer's presence.

After having undergone an extensive renovation, the Linden Opera reopened on 28 April 1928 with a new production of Mozart's Die Zauberflöte. The cast included Delia Reinhardt, Richard Tauber, Friedrich Schorr and Leo Schützendorf, conducted by Erich Kleiber. The same year, the famous Russian bass Feodor Chaliapin and Serge Diaghilev's Ballets Russes with conductor Ernest Ansermet were guest performers. In 1930 Erich Kleiber conducted the premiere of Darius Milhaud's Christophe Colomb. However, in 1934, when symphonic pieces from Alban Berg's Lulu were performed by Kleiber, the National Socialists provoked a scandal and the conductor was forced into exile.

After the Machtergreifung by the Nazis, members of Jewish origin were dismissed from the ensemble. Many German musicians associated with the opera went into exile, including the conductors Kurt Adler, Otto Klemperer and Fritz Busch. Clemens Krauss became a prominent German conductor first at the Berlin State Opera in 1933 and was then appointed as its director in 1935 due to Fritz Busch and Erich Kleiber resigning, respectively, their positions in protest over Nazi rule. In Nazi Germany, Robert Heger, Herbert von Karajan (1939–1945) and Johannes Schüler were the "Staatskapellmeister".

The opera house's interior was destroyed on the night of 9/10 April 1941, during an air raid by the RAF. Hitler ordered its immediate reconstruction, despite wartime shortages, to increase morale. It reopened on 12 December 1942 with a performance of Die Meistersinger von Nürnberg, conducted by Wilhelm Furtwängler, in celebration of the building's 200th anniversary.

The opera house was ruined again in an air raid on 3 February 1945, when it was hit by three bombs that destroyed most of the structure, except the main facade on Unter den Linden.

=== Postwar years ===
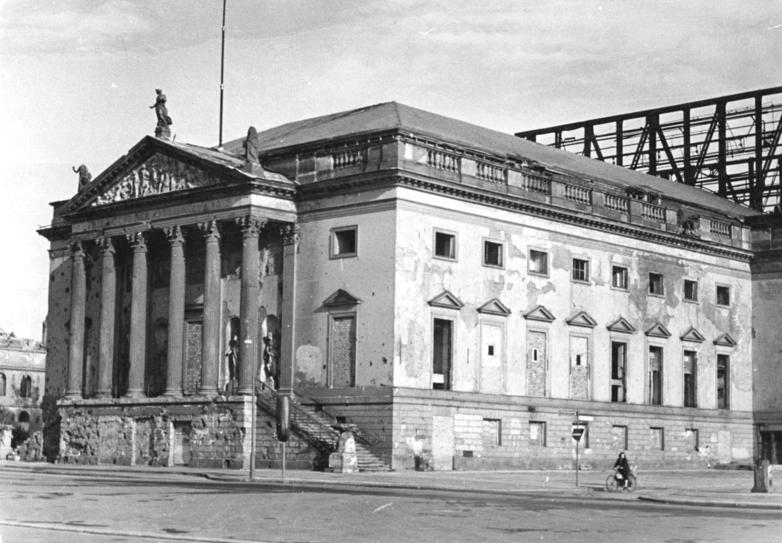
Damaged opera house, 1951 condition

The second rebuilding took a long time. From 1945, the opera company performed at the Admiralspalast. From 1949, the company served as the state opera of East Germany. It moved back to its original home after the rebuilding in freely adapted baroque forms was finally completed in 1955. The newly rebuilt opera house was opened, again, with Wagner's Die Meistersinger von Nürnberg. After the Berlin Wall was built in 1961, the Opera was somewhat isolated, but still maintained a comprehensive repertoire that featured the classic and romantic period together with contemporary ballet and operas.

After reunification, important works that had already performed in the past were rediscovered and discussed anew within the framework of a "Berlin Dramaturgy". Baroque Opera in particular was at the center of attention, with Graun's Cesare e Cleopatra, Keiser's Croesus, Florian Leopold Gassmann's L'opera seria and Scarlatti's Griselda. These works were performed by Belgian conductor René Jacobs together with the Akademie für Alte Musik Berlin and the Freiburger Barockorchester on period instruments. In the 1990s, the opera was officially renamed Staatsoper Unter den Linden.

In 1992, the Argentine-Israeli conductor Daniel Barenboim was appointed Generalmusikdirektor (GMD). In 2000, the orchestra, according to its official website, elected Barenboim "conductor for life." During the 2002 Festtage, he led a Wagner cycle in ten parts, a production created in collaboration with director Harry Kupfer.

In 2009, the Berlin State Opera was closed for renovation work led by German architect HG Merz. The roof of the opera building was raised and the proscenium prolonged to improve the acoustics. The capacity is now 1,350. Other renovation and extension efforts included the director's building, the below-ground connection building and the depot building. The latter houses the new rehearsal center. The house was reopened in 2017 with new productions of Humperdinck's Hänsel und Gretel and Monteverdi's L'incoronazione di Poppea on one weekend. The opera house also hosts the Staatskapelle Berlin orchestra.

On 6 January 2023, the company announced the resignation of Barenboim as its GMD, for health reasons. In January 2023, Christian Thielemann stepped in as an emergency substitute conductor for Barenboim in a new company production of Richard Wagner's Der Ring des Nibelungen. In September 2023, the company announced the appointment of Thielemann as its next GMD, effective 1 September 2024. In October 2026, the Staatsoper Unter den Linden announced an extension of Thielemann's contract as GMD through the 2033–2034 season.

The current Intendantin of the company is Elisabeth Sobotka, since 2024. In October 2026, the company announced an extension of Sobotka's contract as Intendantin through 31 July 2034.

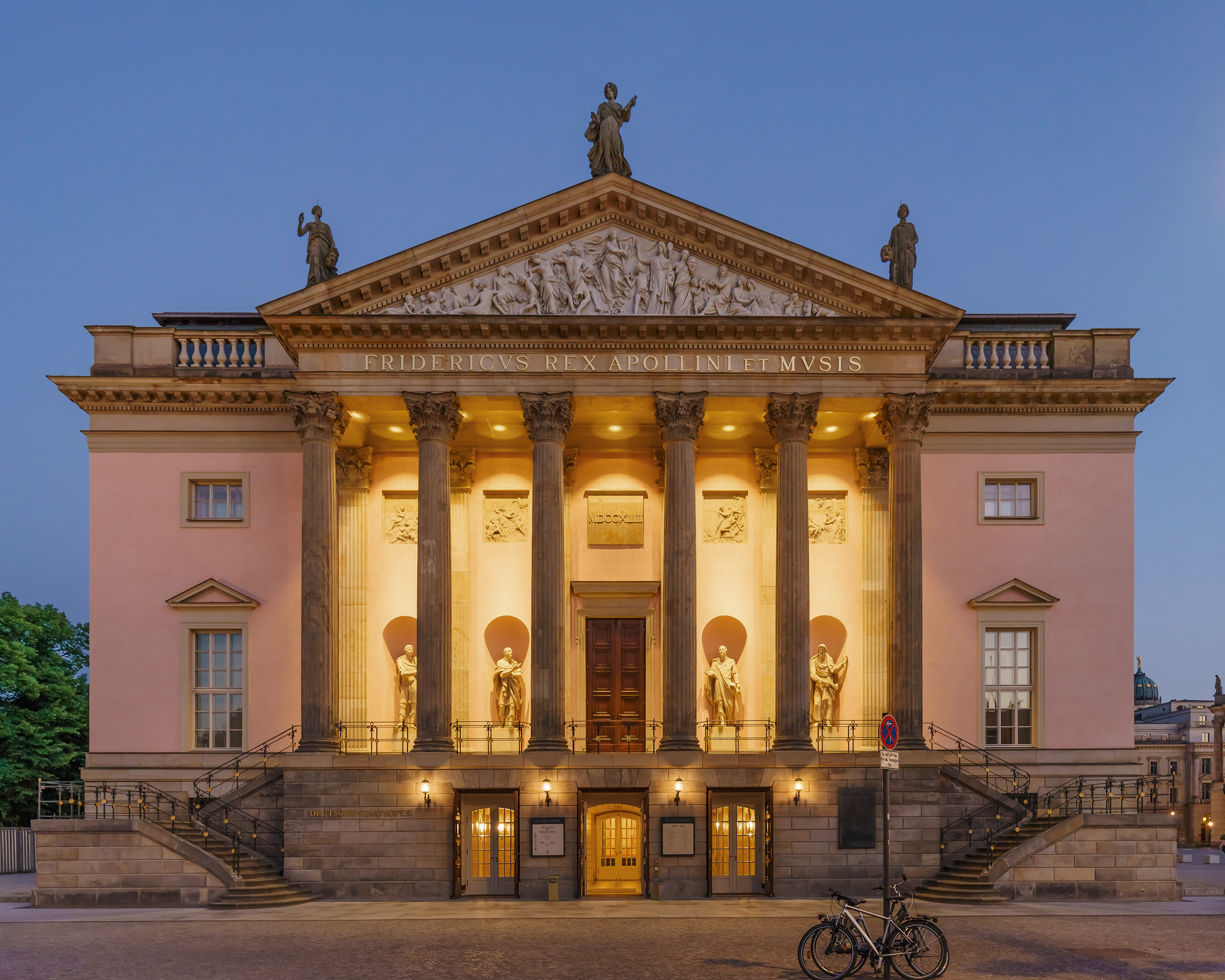
Exterior of the State Opera at evening blue hour, 2018

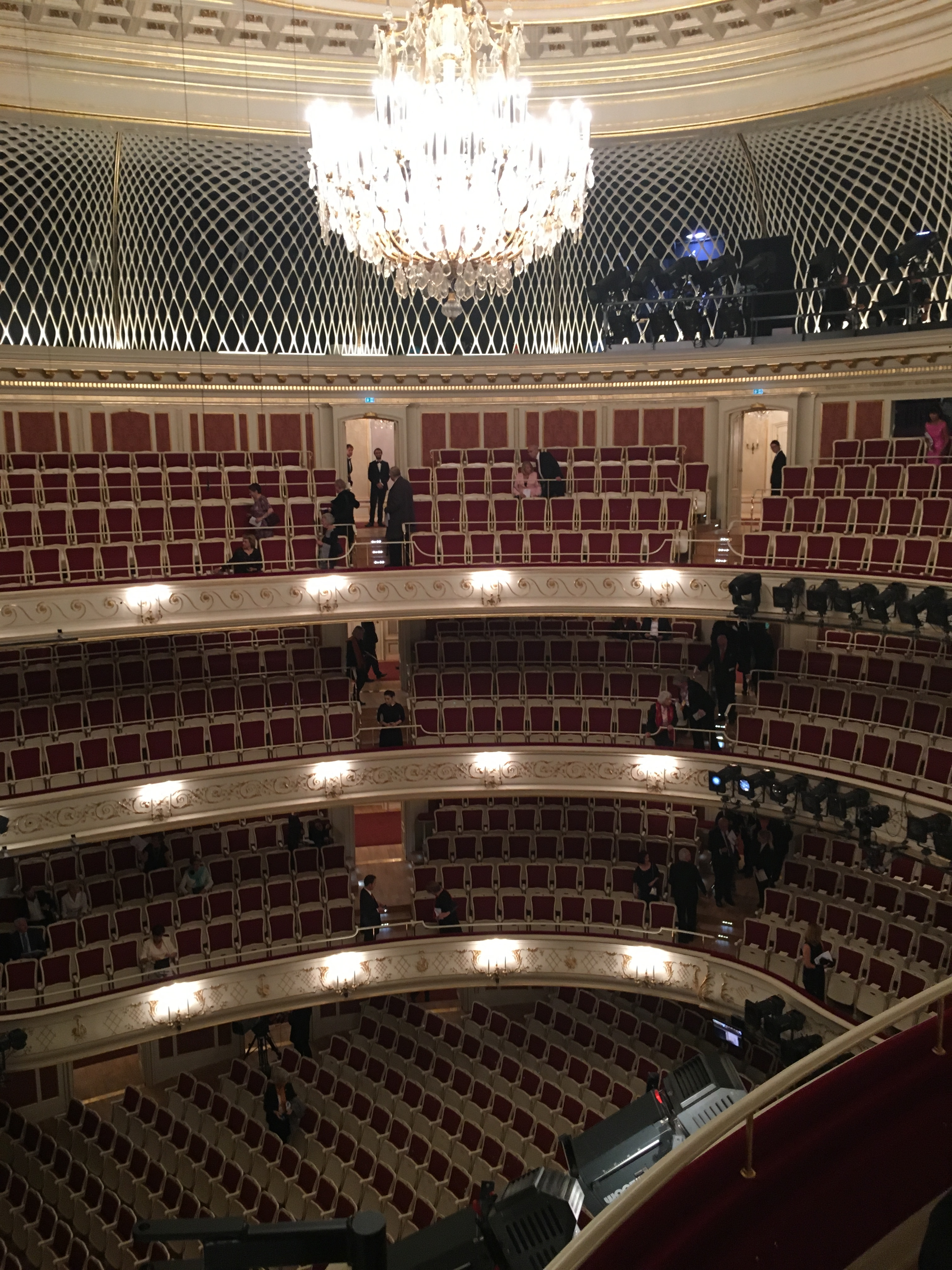
Auditorium of the State Opera on the day of reopening on 3 October 2017, after seven years of refurbishment

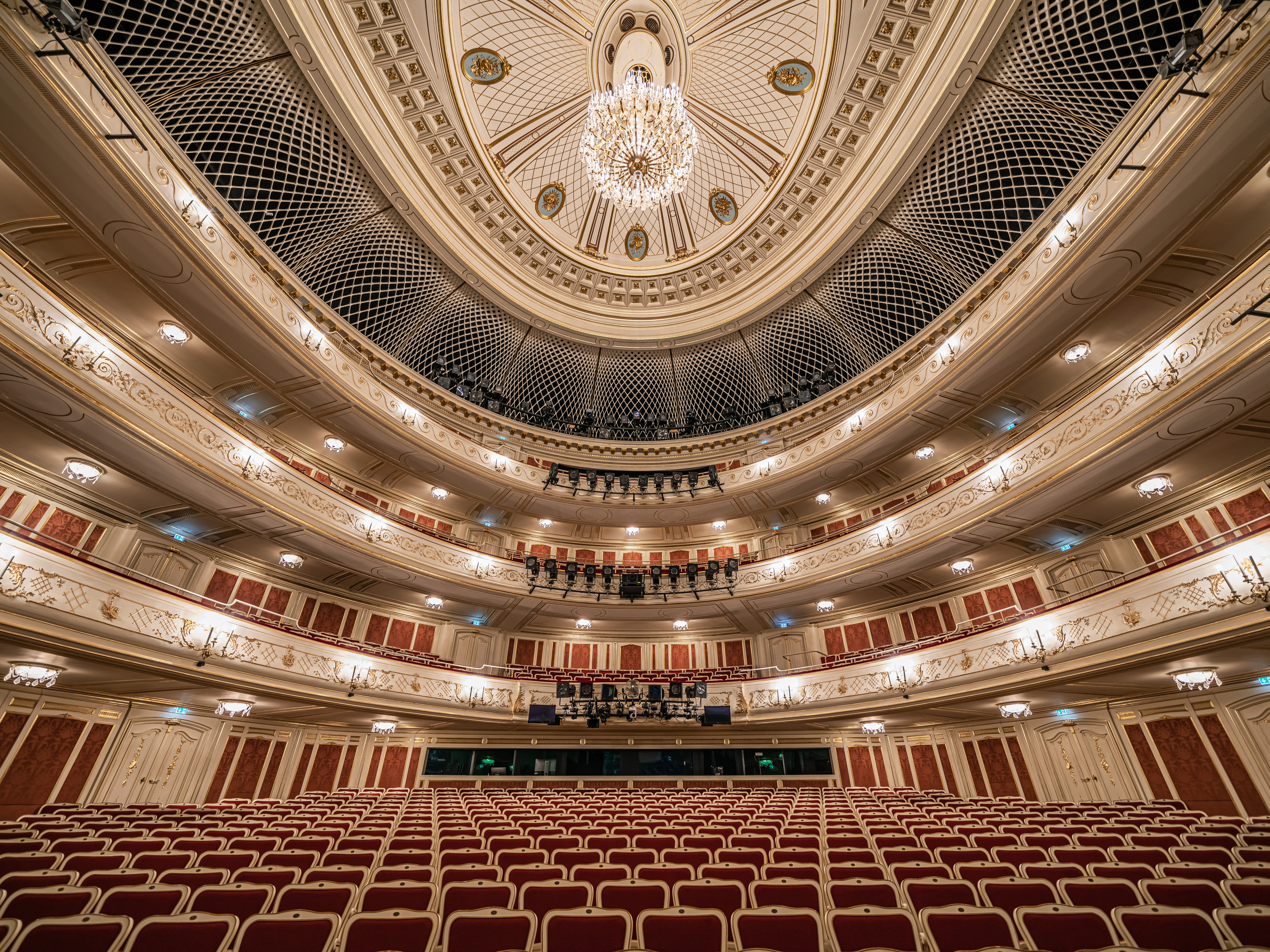
Auditorium, 2021

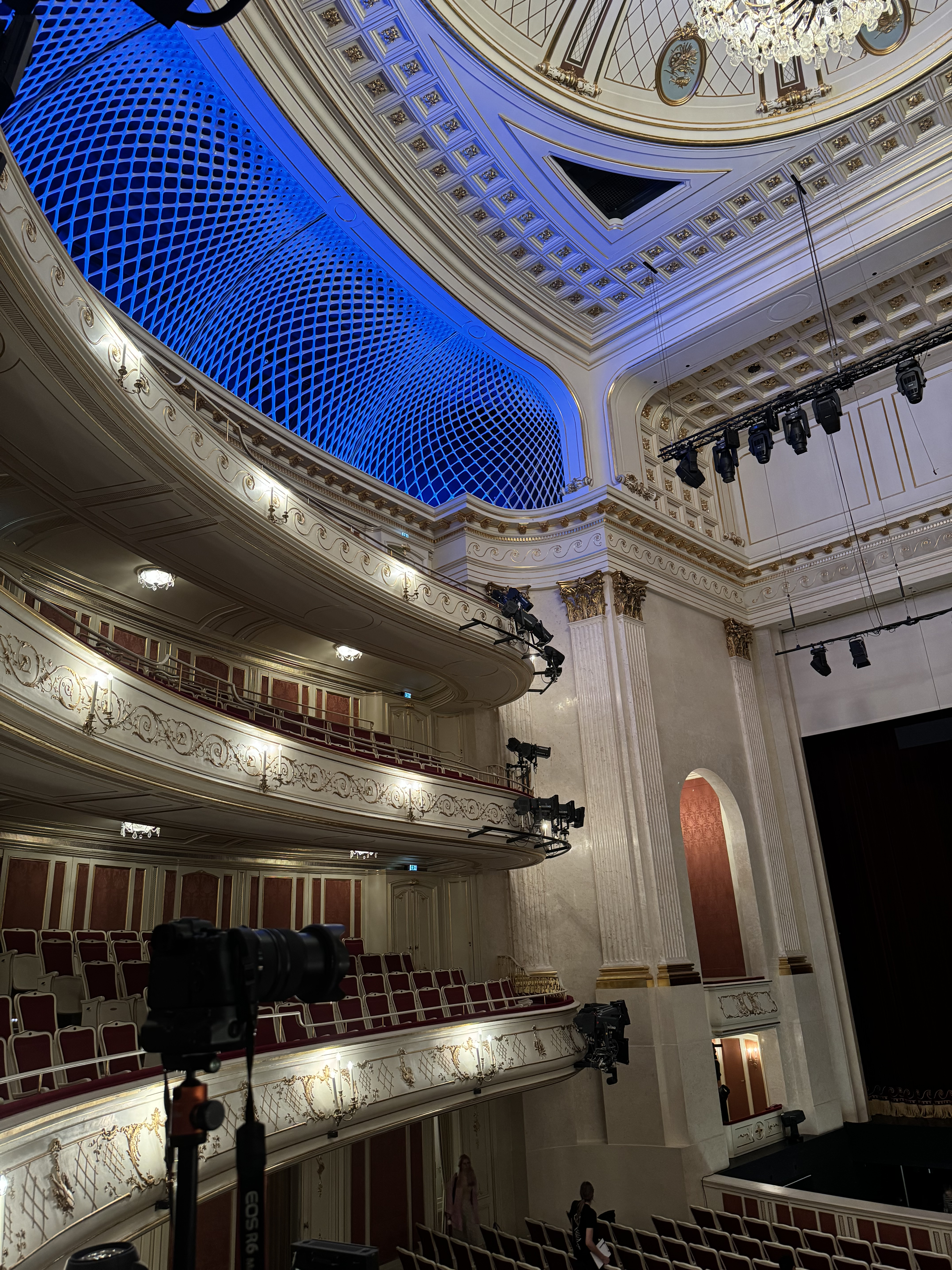
Auditorium, 2024

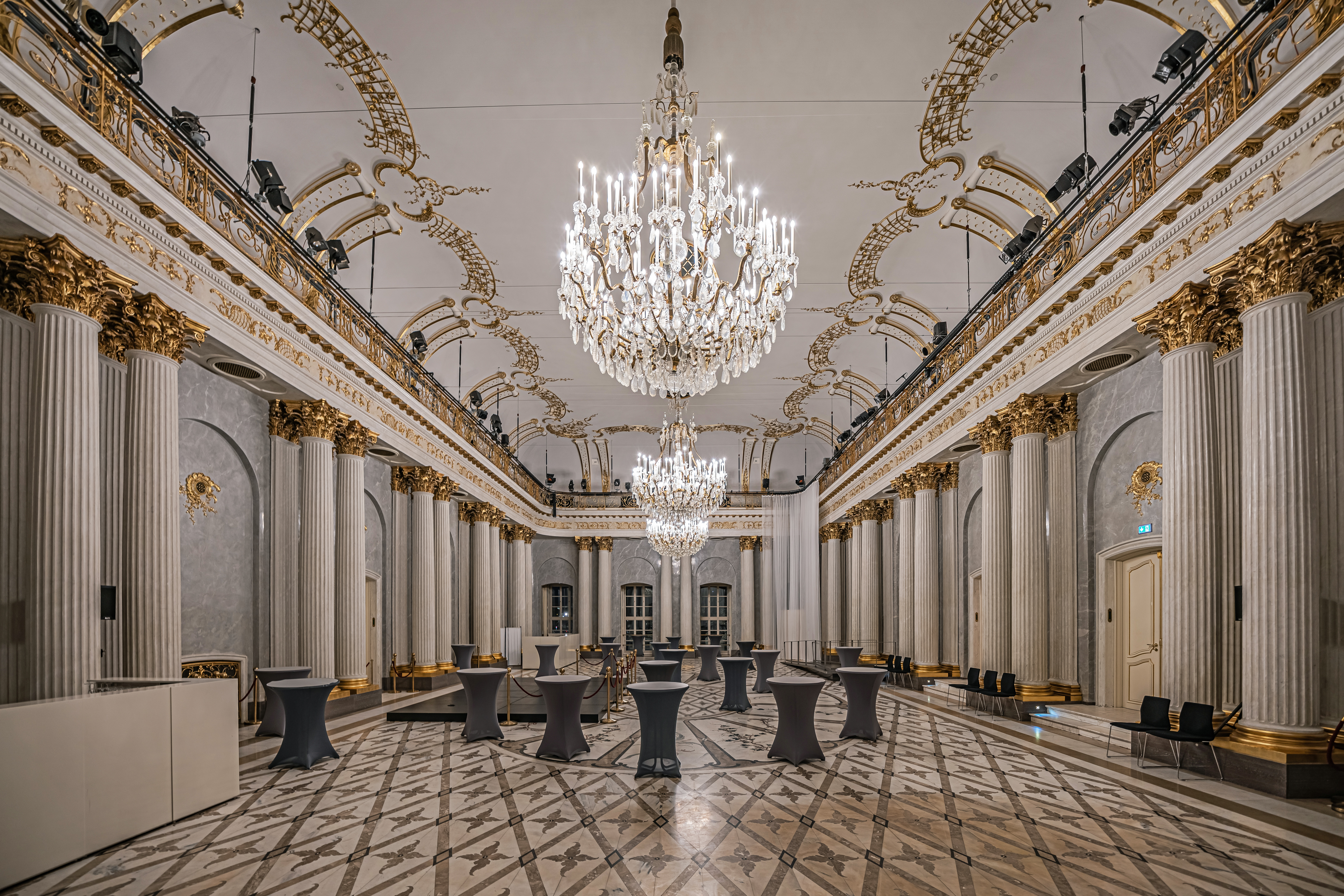
Apollo Hall, 2021

== Leadership ==
- 1743: Baron von Götter and Ernst Maximilian, Baron von Reist Sweerts (aka the Baron de Schwertz)
- Carl Heinrich Graun (1742–1759)
- Johann Friedrich Agricola (1759–1775)
- Johann Friedrich Reichardt (Hofkapellmeister, 1775–1794)
- Bernhard Anselm Weber (1816–1820)
- Gaspare Spontini (1820–1841)
- Giacomo Meyerbeer (1842–1846)
- Otto Nicolai (1848–1849)
- Robert Radecke (Hofkapellmeister, 1871–1887)
- Joseph Sucher (1888–1899)
- Richard Strauss (1899–1913)
- Leo Blech (Hofkapellmeister, 1913–1920)
- Erich Kleiber (1923–1934)
- Clemens Krauss (1935–1936)
- Herbert von Karajan (1941–1945)
- Joseph Keilberth (1948–1951)
- Erich Kleiber (1954–1955)
- Franz Konwitschny (1955–1962)
- Otmar Suitner (1964–1990)
- Daniel Barenboim (1992–2023)
- Christian Thielemann (2024–present)

== Statistics ==
In the 2025–2026 season the opera house had 262.000 visitors, the capacity utilization was 87%.
