= Christoph Siebert =

German choral conductor

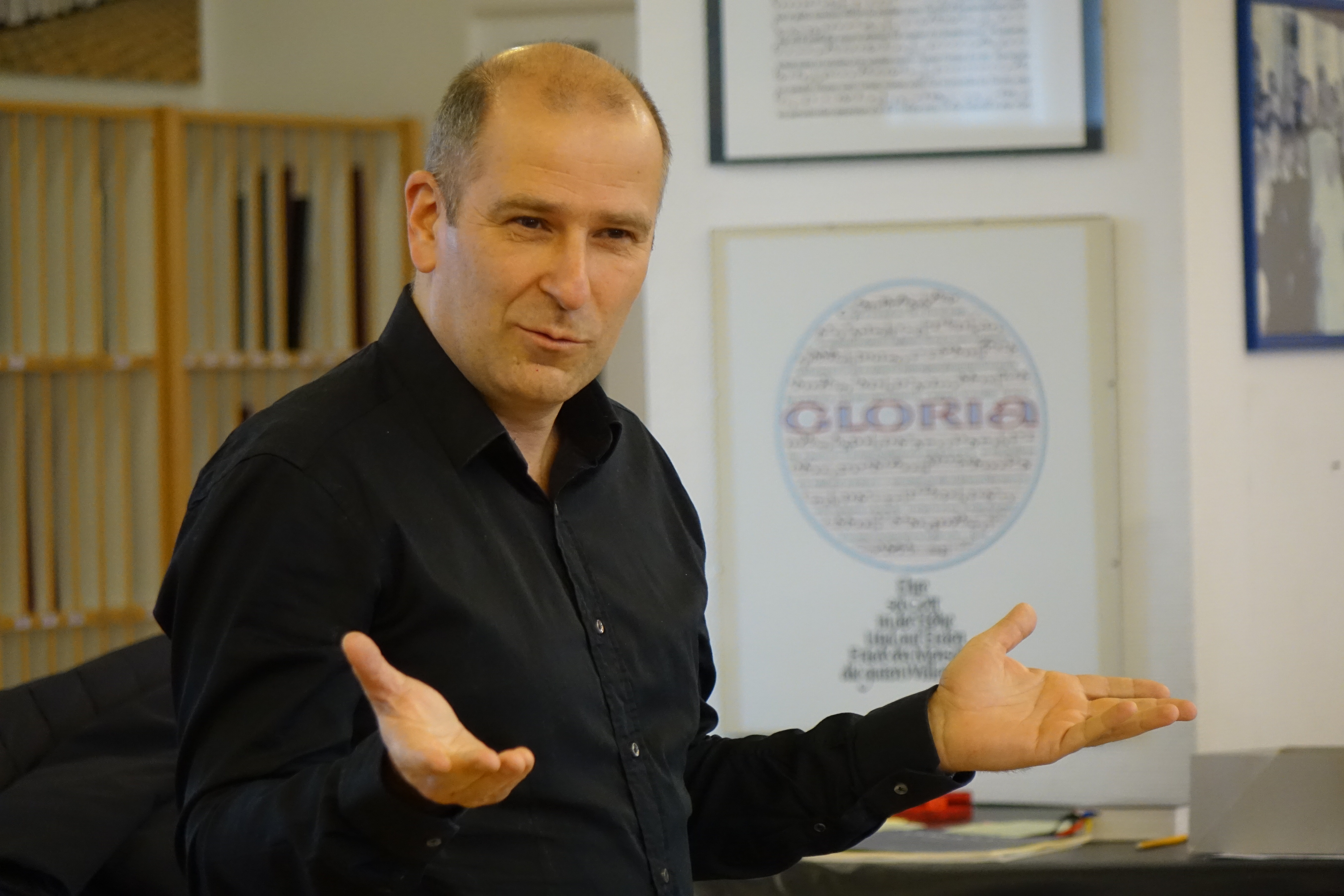
- Siebert teaching at a synod for choral conductors of the Diocese of Limburg in Hadamar on 18 March 2017
- Occupations: Choral conductor; Academic teacher
- Organizations: Collegium Vocale Gent; Hochschule für Musik und Darstellende Kunst Frankfurt

Christoph Siebert is a German choral conductor, coaching and directing ensembles including the Collegium Vocale Gent. He is also an academic teacher in the field.

== Career ==
Siebert studied church music at the Musikhochschule Frankfurt. After his exam, he continued to study choral and orchestral conducting with Wolfgang Schäfer. He received training by John Eliot Gardiner.

He works as a church musician in the parish St. Pankratius in Schwalbach am Taunus, and regularly conducts the Ricarda-Huch-Chor in Dreieich, the vocal ensemble Prophet in Offenbach and the chamber choir Cantemus in Bensheim. He is the regular coach and sometimes conductor of the professional groups Collegium Vocale Gent, often conducted by Philippe Herreweghe, and the deutscher kammerchor.

Siebert conducted the Collegium Vocale Gent in Ruhe, a performance of the Muziektheater Transparant, with part songs by Schubert including "Ruhe, schönstes Glück der Erde", and by Annelies Van Parys. It was shown from 2007 to 2010 at festivals in Europe and Australia. In Accatone, a production of the 2015 Ruhrtriennale staged by Johan Simons after Pier Paolo Pasolini, Siebert conducted the Collegium Vocale Gent singing excerpts from five Bach cantatas, with soloists Dorothee Mields, Alex Potter, Thomas Hobbs and Peter Kooy. He prepared the choir for a performance of Haydn's Die Schöpfung, conducted by René Jacobs at the same festival.

As a guest he has prepared the Rundfunkchor Berlin for a concert with Simon Rattle and the Berlin Philharmonic. He has worked with the Vokalconsort Berlin, the Deutsche Kammerphilharmonie Bremen, the Freiburger Barockorchester and the Chapelle Royale, and with conductors such as Sylvain Cambreling, Marcus Creed, Attilio Cremonesi, Paavo Järvi, Louis Langrée, Neville Marriner and John Nelson. He prepared the Frauenchor des Europachores Frankfurt (women's choir of the Europe Choir Frankfurt) for a performance of Mahler's Third Symphony, performed at the Alte Oper Frankfurt on 4 February 2015 with Nathalie Stutzmann, the Limburger Domsingknaben and the hr-Sinfonieorchester conducted by Andrés Orozco-Estrada. The performance was broadcast by Hessischer Rundfunk.

Siebert founded the orchestra concerto classico frankfurt which plays on period instruments, focused on Baroque and Classical period oratorios in historically informed performance.

He has been a lecturer for chorale conducting at the Hochschule für Musik und Darstellende Kunst in Frankfurt. At a synod of chorale conductors of the Diocese of Limburg, held in the boarding school of the Limburger Domsingknaben in Hadamar on 18 March 2017, he covered the topic Probenmethodik (Methods of rehearsing).

In summer 2020 Christoph Siebert will take over the artistic direction of the Bach-Verein Köln.
