= Spyglass =

Spyglass may refer to:

== People with the surname ==
- J. Elmer Spyglass (1877–1957), American singer

== Other uses ==
- Another term for a hand-held refracting telescope for terrestrial observation
  - A monocular, a compact refractor
- "Spy Glass", a recurring sketch on Saturday Night Live
- Spyglass Media Group, entertainment company formerly known as Spyglass Entertainment
- Spyglass Board Games, a collection of board games on Xbox Live Arcade
- Spyglass, Inc., software company
- Spyglass Hill Golf Course
- Spyglass (album), a mini-album by J-pop singer, Kaori Utatsuki
- Spyglass (app), a navigation and orientation mobile application
