= Annelies Van Parys =

Belgian composer (born 1975)

- Born: 5 June 1975 (age 51); Bruges, Belgium
- Education: Royal Conservatory of Ghent
- Occupations: Classical composer; Academic teacher
- Organizations: Muziektheater Transparant; Royal Conservatory of Brussels; Conservatory of Bruges
- Awards: Vlaanderen/Quebec Prize
- Website: anneliesvanparys.be

Annelies Van Parys (born 5 June 1975) is a Belgian classical composer of chamber music, symphonic music, music for theatre productions and opera.

== Life ==
Born in Bruges, Van Parys studied at the Royal Conservatory of Ghent, piano with Johan Duijck and composition with Luc Brewaeys.

She composed in 2001 Phrases V for guitar, harp, piano and percussion. The piece of about 9 minutes was written for the Ictus Ensemble and premiered in Bruges by the ensemble Contr'Art. It was awarded the prize Vlaanderen/Quebec and was performed in Montreal on 15 May 2002. In 2005, she wrote Méditation, a piece of about 7 minutes for a double wind quintet. It was premiered by I Solisti del Vento at a festival in Antwerp's centre for the arts deSingel on 23 October 2005. Her first symphony, written on a commission by deFilharmonie (now Antwerp Symphony Orchestra) and dedicated toLuc Brewaeys and subtitled "Carillon", was premiered at the Centre for Fine Arts, Brussels (BOZAR), on 26 October 2006 by deFilharmonie conducted by Sian Edwards.

She composed Poème for solo voice for the mezzo-soprano Els Mondelaers, who premiered it at the Academia Belgica in Rome on 30 March 2006. Van Parys wrote Stanza for solo harp on a commission of the Bijloke where it was premiered by Isabelle Moretti in a concert on 8 March 2007. She composed music for Ruhe, a performance of the Muziektheater Transparant which also featured part songs by Schubert. It was shown, with the Collegium Vocale Gent conducted by Christoph Siebert, from 2007 to 2010 at festivals in Europe and Australia. The second symphony "Les Ponts" was written for the Symfonieorkest Vlaanderen who premiered it, conducted by Otto Tausk at the Brussels Conservatory on 14 March 2008.

Van Parys composed An Index of Memories for five voices and ensemble in 2009 and 2010, for a theatrical performance of the Spectra Ensemble. Directed by Caroline Petrick, it was premiered in a production of Muziektheater Transparant at deSingel in Antwerp on 12 March 2010. The music was performed by Vocaallab Nederland, Spectra Ensemble and Triatu, conducted by Marit Strindlund. Van Parys wrote Een Oresteia for three women's voices and ensemble on a commission by Eduard van Beinumstichting. Another theatrical work, it was first produced at the Concertgebouw, Bruges, on 18 February 2011, again by Muziektheater Transparant directed by Petrick. The music was performed by the Vocaallab Nederland (Bauwien Vandermeer, Els Mondelaers, Elsbeth Gerritsen) and the ensemble Asko/Schönberg conducted by Alejo Pérez. In 2012 she made a reduction from Debussy’s Pelléas et Mélisande for Ensemble Oxalys. The arrangement was called “A Miracle” in the press and has been used many times for other chamber performances of the opera a.o. The English Touring Opera and Theater an der Wien. Her first opera, Private View, on a libretto by Gaea Schoeters, was premiered by was premiered by Neue Vocalsolisten Stuttgart, and Asko/Schoenberg in a production of Muziektheater Transparant on 13 May 2015.

In 2012 she made a reduction from Debussy’s Pelléas et Mélisande for Ensemble Oxalys. The arrangement was called “A Miracle” in the press and has been used many times for other chamber performances of the opera a.o. The English Touring Opera and Theater an der Wien. Her first opera, Private Views, on a libretto by Jen Hadfield after a scenario of Gaea Schoeters Tom Creed, was premiered by Neue Vocalsolisten Stuttgart, and Asko/Schoenberg in a production of Muziektheater Transparant on 13 May 2015.[7]

For the 2018 commemoration of WWI, Van Parys wrote A War Requiem on text of the German Playwright Dea Loher. The piece was premiered by the Belgian National Orchestra at Bozar on the closing event of the commemorations in the presence of the Belgian King Philippe and Queen Mathilde. The same year her chamber opera USHER, a direct commission of Staatsoper Berlin and Folkoperan Stockholm, was premièred at Staatsoper Unter den Linden. The piece was a contemporary completion of Debussy’s La chute de la maison Usher. The libretto was completed Gaea Schoeters, staging by Philippe Quesne, the musicians of the Staatskapelle were conducted by Marit Strindlund. The piece was nominated for the coveted Opera Awards. In 2020 it was revived again at Staatsoper Berlin.

In 2022 -with a year delay due to COVID- her orchestra work Eco… del vuoto, a commission of the Royal Concertgebouw Orchestra, was premiered under the baton of Kristiina Poska. That same year also her piano concerto for Jan Michiels and the Antwerp Symphony Orchestra had its premiere with Martyn Brabbins conducting.

During the summer she received a 9 week recidency in Tokyo (Tokyo Arts and Space) where she finished her chamber opera Notwehr, dedicated to Bielorussian dissident Maria Kaleshnikava, on texts of Gaea Schoeters and staged by Sjaron Minailo that was commissioned by the Venice Biennale.

In 2024, her orchestra piece EUTOPIA that was commissioned by Bozar for the European Union Youth Orchestra and premièred under the baton of Alexandre Bloch, received great acclaim. A year later, in 2025 she wrote Fantasie, further elaborating the themes of EUTOPIA but now as an oratorio in reply on Beethoven 9 on a text of Gaea Schoeters. The performers were Flanders Symphony Orchestra, Revue Blanche (with Lore Binon as soprano), the Estonian Radio Philharmonic Chamber Choir and conductor Kristiina Poska.

In 2025 she wrote the compulsory piece for Trumpet for the ARD Competition. …savoir comment… was funded by the Ernst von Siemens Foundation and premiered in September by all 6 Semi-finalists for Trumpet.

For 2026 she again collaborated with EUYO for there [Uncertain] Seasons project. The [Uncertain] Spring was commissioned by the Ernst von Siemens Foundation and premiered by the EUYO strings March 10, 2026.

On March 12, her short monodrama JUDITH (on a text of Gaea Schoeters) was premièred in the performance Harvest at Opera Europa Festival in Muziekgebouw aan’t Ij by Soprano Claron McFadden and pianist Miles Walter.

Van Parys has been a teacher of composition and form analysis at the Royal Conservatory of Brussels, and of piano at the Conservatory of Bruges.

== Awards ==
Van Parys was awarded the Vlaanderen/Quebec Prize 2001, the prize Jeugd en Muziek in 2004, and the prize of the Brothers Darche in 2009. She was a laureat of the Royal Flemish Academy for Arts and Sciences of Belgium in 2011, and a member of the Academy from 2014.
