= Farangis Nurulla-Khoja =

Tajik-Canadian composer

Farangis Nurulla-Khoja (born 1972) is a Tajik-Canadian composer, who explores timbre within her contemporary compositions of symphonic, chamber, vocal, and electro-acoustic music. Among her many honors is a Guggenheim Fellowship Award in Composition in 2018.

== Life ==
Farangis Nurulla-Khoja currently resides in Montréal, Quebec, but was born in Dushanbe, Tajikistan and is related to the well-known Tajik composer, Ziyodullo Shahidi. She not only earned a Ph.D. of Fine Arts in Composition (2004) from University of Gothenburg, Sweden, but has also studied at the University of California, San Diego as well as at IRCAM in Paris. Her early education was in piano at the Ziyodullo Shahidi Special Music School (1979–1990). In addition, she was a researcher in ethnomusicology at the Pitt Rivers Museum in Oxford (1992–1993) where she studied both Tajik and Chinese music traditions.

Nurulla-Khoja has studied with an international array of composers from Ole Lützow-Holm (b. 1954) to Roger Reynolds (b. 1934) and from Brian Ferneyhough (b. 1943) to Philippe Leroux (b. 1953). She was composer in residence at Fondation Royaumont (2005–06), working on the project Maqam et Créations; at the Bellagio Center of the Rockefeller Foundation (2010) in Italy; and at the Experimental Studio (2010–11) in Freiburg, Germany.

Nurulla-Khoja's compositional output has been heard around the world. She employs a contemporary musical aesthetic drawn from both Asian and European sources across symphonic, chamber, film, vocal, and electro-acoustic music genres. Her compositional palette melds microtonal, tone clusters, and sharp melodic elements. Dance and poetry are active participants in her compositional process. Her works have been performed by many notable ensembles, such as:

- ICTUS (Belgium)
- Avanti! (Finland)
- Neue Vocalsolisten Stuttgart (New Music Festival, Germany)
- Ziggurat (International Gaudeamus Music Week, Holland)
- New Juilliard Chamber Ensemble (NY, NY)
- Turning Point Ensemble (Vancouver, Canada)
- Gothenburg Symphony
- Shanghai Symphony Orchestra (Shanghai, China)
- Montpellier Symphony Orchestra (Montpellier, France)
- Oslo Sinfonietta (Oslo, Norway)
- Oviedo National Orchestra (Oviedo, Spain)
- Bienne Solar Symphony Orchestra-Orchestre Syphonique Bienne Soleure (Bienne, Switzerland)
- Winnipeg Symphony Orchestra (Winnipeg, Canada)
- Rubinstein Symphony Orchestra, (Lodz, Poland)
- Ensemble Transmission (Montréal, Canada)
- Continuum ensemble (NYC, US)
- Duo Gelland (Sweden)

== Selected works ==
1. "Daidu"
Concerto for violin, string orchestra, and three percussion instruments
Won 2nd Prize at the Grazyna Bacewicz International Composer Competition in Lodz, Pologne in 2015
Running 18:46
"Daidu" is a 21st-century, polytonal work that contains clear motivic elements echoed between solo violin and orchestra. It has jarring rhythms and quick, ascending chromatic scales, which interplay with sudden dissonant tones held in one long bow stroke. It is atmospheric, especially when the percussion accompanies the solo violin passages.
Listen at > https://soundcloud.com/farangisnurulla/daidu

2. "Gusto"
Form unknown, written for large chamber ensemble
Commissioned and premiered by Kammarensemblen during the Stockholm New Music Festival, with the support of the Swedish Art Council
Composed in 2012
Running 9:32
"Gusto" is 21st century, polytonal work that contains sliding ascending and descending chromatic scales, increasing and decreasing forcefully in volume throughout the piece. It requires that instruments should be played at the farthest extensions of their ranges. Throughout the pronounced sliding scales, short melodies can be heard, especially in the violins.
Listen at > https://www.youtube.com/watch?v=mrWERfSbenM

For a complete list, see Farangis Nurulla-Khoja's website (http://farangis-nurulla.com/works/)

== Honors ==
- 2000 - Grand Prize for "Replica" from Abu Gazali Foundation in Salzburg, Austria
- 2008 - Best Mid-Career Composer from Canada Arts Council's Joseph S. Stauffer Prize for the Arts
- 2010 - Composition Prize for "Parparon" Third Magistralia Competition for Composers in Oviedo, Spain
- 2012 - STIM-Stipendium Award
- 2014 - Awarded 3rd Prize for "Ravishi Nur" - concerto for saxophone and orchestra for Andrey Petrov Composers Competition in Saint Petersburg, Russia
- 2015 - Awarded 2nd Prize for "Daidu" - concerto for violin, string orchestra, and three percussion instruments for Grazyna Bacewicz International Composer Competition in Lodz, Pologne
- 2016 - Composition Prize (placement is unknown) for "L'infini de l'instant" in Andrey Petrov Composers Competition in Saint Petersburg, Russia
- 2016 - Prize of Recognition from Longueuil Art Council
- 2017 - Gold Medal "Best of Show" for "Incandescence" for Global Music Awards
- 2018 - Guggenheim Fellowship Award in Composition from John Simon Guggenheim Foundation
