= Marit Strindlund =

Swedish conductor

Marit Strindlund is a Swedish conductor. From 2000 to 2004, Strindlund studied conducting with Professor Jorma Panula at the Royal College of Music in Stockholm. She continued her postgraduate studies at Royal Northern College of Music, Manchester, specialising in opera conducting, 2004-2006.

In opera, Strindlund has conducted productions with Muziektheater Transparant Antwerpen, Belgium, Gothenburg Opera House, Värmland Opera House, British Youth Opera Saddler's Wells, Opera Garden Aberdeen, Gageego/Atalante, amongst others.

As orchestra conductor, she has performed with Norrköping Symphony Orchestra, Helsingborg Symphony Orchestra, Nordic Chamber Orchestra, Dalasinfoniettan, Värmlandssinfoniettan, Västerås Sinfonietta, Southbank Sinfonia, Kammarensemblen, amongst others.
