= J. Elmer Spyglass =

American singer (1877–1957)

- James Elmer Spyglass
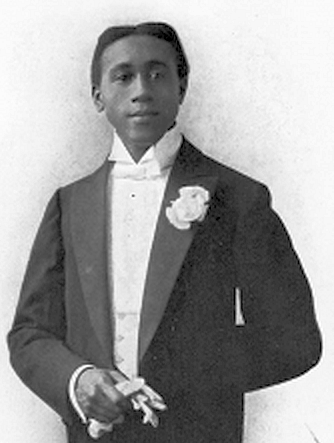
- Born: 1 November 1877; Springfield
- Died: 16 February 1957 (aged 79); Schwalbach am Taunus (West Germany)
- Resting place: Glen Forest Cemetery
- Occupations: Singer (1901–1930), interpreter (1945–)
- Employer: Consulate General of the United States, Frankfurt
- Awards: honorary citizenship (Schwalbach am Taunus, 1954)

James Elmer Spyglass (November 1, 1877 – February 16, 1957) was an American singer, who lived most of his lifetime in Europe and later worked for the Consulate General of the United States, Frankfurt.

== Life and career ==
He was born in Springfield, Ohio. In 1897 he became a founding member of St. John's Missionary Baptist Church in Springfield. After that, he dedicated his life to music and became a cabaret singer. He was chorus director at Bethel A. M. E. Church in Pittsburgh until 1901. He was a baritone vocalist and in 1905, he graduated from the Toledo Conservatory of Music. He also attended Western Pennsylvania University. At the Carnegie Music Hall in Pittsburgh, Pennsylvania, he accompanied a 25 piece orchestra and a 200-member choir in singing Strauss's "An der schönen blauen Donau".

=== Career as singer in Europe ===
In 1906 he went to Europe and established himself as an interpreter of "Negro Spirituals". For 20 years, he sang in the Netherlands to cheering audiences. He performed primarily in Amsterdam, Rotterdam, Scheveningen and The Hague and toured the Dutch Indies (now Indonesia) in the early 1920's. He frequently performed in Frankfurt, especially between 1910 and 1914. There he performed at the Klein cabaret (formerly Zu den bösen Buben, 'To the bad boys') in Kaiserstr., the Intimes Theater and the Trocadero. He toured all over Europe and learned to speak several languages fluently, and he sang not only in these languages but also in dialects. In Paris, for example, he performed with Mistinguette and Sarah Bernhardt, and in Berlin with Otto Reutter. In Munich he was a partner of Lisl Karlstadt and Karl Valentin. In addition, there were guest tours to today's Czech Republic, Hungary, Scandinavia and possibly Russia. During his rare visits home to the USA, a concert announcement in The New York Age of 5 September 1912 stated that he was "perhaps the best lyric baritone among African Americans".

In 1930 he retired to Sachsenhausen, a suburb of Frankfurt. He continued to live freely in Germany during the war, although he was an "enemy" as an American and as a person of color he was considered to be an "inferior race" by the Nazis. The German authorities had not caused him any problems. However, he had to appear at the police station every week. His house in Sachsenhausen was bombed in 1944, and he changed his residence to Schwalbach.

=== After World War II in Germany ===
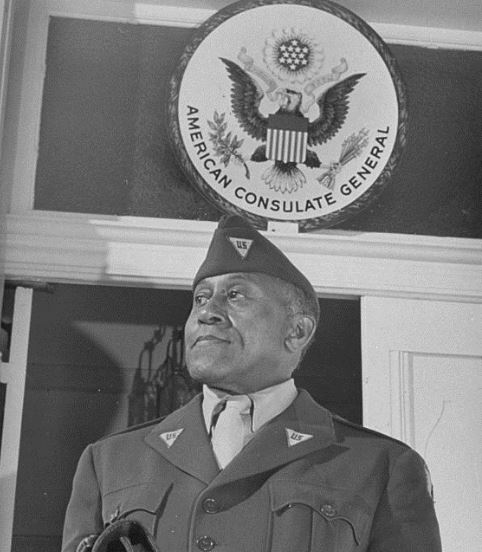
James Elmer Spyglass as Receptionist for the Consulate General of the United States in Frankfurt

After World War II, Spyglass became an interpreter and receptionist in the US consulate in Frankfurt. His job was to greet visitors to the consulate—many of them intending to become emigrants to the US—and to direct them to the appropriate office. Spyglass was fluent in five European languages, so he opened up language classes and taught English to local townspeople for a number of years.

In 1947 he had an interview with Will Lang Jr. of Life to discuss his life and his role as a receptionist. According to Lang, Spyglass's "pleasant coffee-colored face" greeted everyone who came "to do business with the US." Lang mentions that the consul general, Sidney B. Redecker, was one of the few people who addressed the "colored man" by his first name, Elmer. "To others he is known respectfully as 'Mr Spyglass.'" Will Lang's article appeared in Life on November 3, 1947.

=== Last years ===
On November 9, 1954, Spyglass became an honorary citizen of Schwalbach, Germany. Spyglass died on 16 February 1957. The American Consul General, John Burns, the mayor, councilors and many of Schwalbach’s citizens attended his memorial service. His ashes were returned to Yellow Springs, Ohio where his remnant was buried beside his parents.

== Spyglass Prize ==
On January 8, 1995, a student in Schwalbach was the first to receive the "James Elmer Spyglass Prize" for contributions to intercultural relations.

== Bibliography ==
- Lang, Will (March 11, 1947). "Life's Reports: J. Elmer Spyglass – Ex cabaret singer helps Germans about the U.S. and its democracy". Life.
- van Delden, Ate; Openeer, Herman (1979). "Vaderlandsche Jazz Geschiedenis". Doctor Jazz. 88.
- zur Heide, Karl Gert (1983). "Elmer Spyglass". Doctor Jazz. 100.
- Füllgrabe, Jörg (1994). "Wer war Elmer Spyglass". Schwalbach.
- Higman, Christopher (1996). "Der Schwalbacher Ehrenbürger Elmer Spyglass (1877–1957)". Jahrbuch des Main-Taunus Kreises.
- Vogt, Günther (1981). Schwalbach am Taunus: 781–1981. Druckerei Hugo Hassmüller.
- Pehl, Hans; Schwab, Jürgen (2005). "Vom Kaiserreich zur Weimarer Republik". In Schwab, Jürgen (ed.). Der Frankfurt Sound (2nd ed.).
- Higman, Chris. "Elmer Spyglass" (PDF).
- Lotz, Rainer E. (December 2006). "Elmer James Spyglass. Singer, Instrumentalist and Diplomat – An Update (part 1)". Doctor Jazz. 44 (195): 10–17.
- Lotz, Rainer E. (March 2007). "Elmer James Spyglass. Singer, Instrumentalist and Diplomat – An Update (part 2)". Doctor Jazz. 44 (196).
- Lotz, Rainer E. (2008). "Spyglass, Elmer". The African American National Biography. Vol. 2. Harvard University Press.
- Mutsaers, Lutgard (2019). "Een nieuwe lente en een international geluid: De Mei van Spyglass in Utrecht". Jaarboek Oud-Utrecht. pp. 229–255.
