= Wim Henderickx =

Belgian composer (1962–2022)

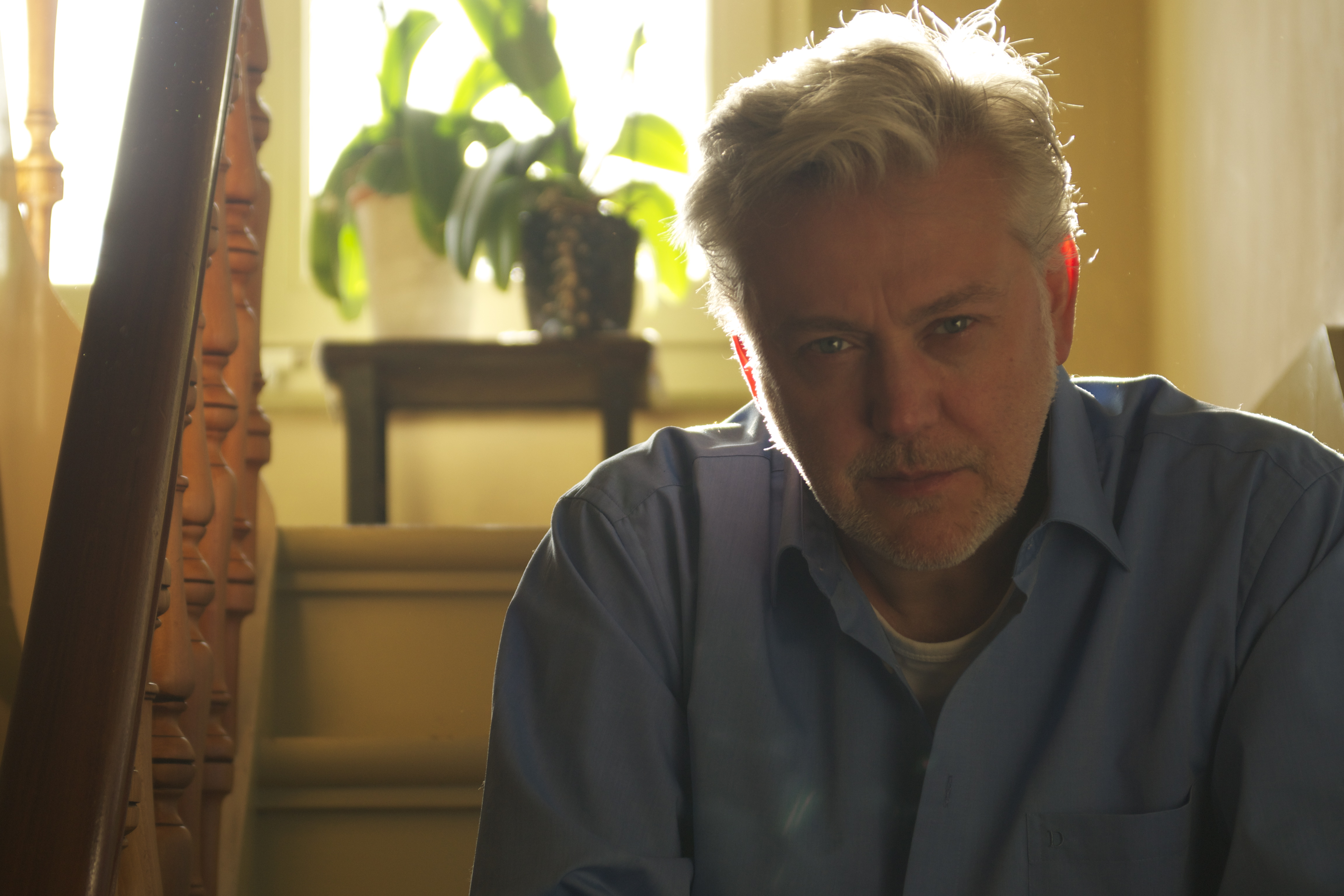
- Henderickx in 2013
- Born: 17 March 1962; Lier, Belgium
- Died: 18 December 2022 (aged 60)
- Education: Royal Conservatoire of Antwerp
- Occupations: Percussionist; composer; academic teacher
- Organizations: Royal Conservatoire of Antwerp; Conservatorium van Amsterdam; Muziektheater Transparant; Antwerp Symphony Orchestra
- Website: www.wimhenderickx.com

Wim Henderickx (Dutch: [ʋɪm ˈɦɛndərɪks]; 17 March 1962 – 18 December 2022) was a Belgian composer of contemporary classical music. He was composer in residence at Muziektheater Transparant and the Antwerp Symphony Orchestra, writing operas and other stage works. His music was influenced by oriental music and philosophy. He taught composition at the Royal Conservatoire of Antwerp and the Conservatorium van Amsterdam.

== Life and career ==
Henderickx was born in Lier and began his music career as a jazz and rock drummer. He studied percussion and composition at the Royal Conservatoire of Antwerp, graduating in percussion in 1984, and in composition in 1992 with Willem Kersters. He studied sonology at IRCAM and at the Royal Conservatory of The Hague. In the 1990s he also attended the Darmstädter Ferienkurse.

Henderickx was a professor of analysis, harmony and counterpoint at the Royal Conservatoire of Antwerp from 1986 to 1995. He taught composition, harmony and counterpoint at the Lemmensinstituut in Leuven from 1989 to 2002. From 1995, he was professor of composition and analysis in Antwerp, and from 2002, also professor of composition at the Conservatorium van Amsterdam. He was composer in residence at Muziektheater Transparant beginning in 1996. From 2000 he was the main coach of the Summer Composition Course SoundMine for young composers at Provinciaal Domein Dommelhof in Neerpelt. From 2013, he was an artist in residence at deFilharmonie (now the Antwerp Symphony Orchestra). In 2017, his Requiem was performed by Opera Ballet Flanders, and choreographed by Sidi Larbi Cherkaoui. His opera De Bekeerlinge (The Convert) was premiered in May 2022, becoming Opera Ballet Flanders' most successful contemporary production in over 20 years.

Henderickx died at his home on 18 December 2022, at the age of 60.

== Music and style ==
Henderickx composed operas, orchestral and choral works, works for wind bands, and chamber music. He used electronics in his works. His music is characterised by non-western elements, chiefly Indian classical music, raga, and the rhythms of African music. It employs changing timbres and structures inspired by Eastern philosophy. He was influenced by Olivier Messiaen, Iannis Xenakis, Igor Stravinsky, György Ligeti and Béla Bartók. As a percussionist, he often made use of an extended arsenal of percussion instruments.

=== Works ===
Many of Henderickx's early works were influenced by oriental music and philosophy. He wrote Mysterium (1989) for 10 woodwinds, OM (1992) for string quartet, and Dawn (1992) for mezzo-soprano, female chorus and instrumental ensemble.

His opera Triumph of Spirit over Matter (2000) was commissioned by Muziektheater Transparant and toured in Belgium and the Netherlands.

His opera for young people, Achilleus, was produced in 2003 by the Flemish Opera. It was translated into Danish and staged in Copenhagen in 2006.

cover of program book of Olek schoot een beer

Een Totale Entführung was a music theatre production made in cooperation with Ramsey Nasr and based on Mozart's Die Entführung aus dem Serail. The 2006 Olek schoot een beer was based on Bart Moeyaert's adaptation of the Firebird story.

Henderickx wrote Canzone for voice and piano for the semi-finals of the 2008 Queen Elisabeth Music Competition.

After a trip through India and Nepal, Henderickx created his "Tantric Cycle":

- The Seven Chakras (2004) for string quartet
- Nada Brahma (2005) for soprano, ensemble and electronics
- Maya's Dream (2005) for oboe and ensemble
- Void/Sunyata (2007) for five singers, ensemble and electronics, commissioned by Music Theatre Transparent and based on a Shri Yantra
- Disappearing in Light (2008) for mezzo-soprano, viola, alto flute and percussion
- Tejas (what does the sound of the universe look like?) (2009) for orchestra, commissioned by the Royal Flemish Philharmonic
- Mudra (2010) for mixed ensemble.

Groove! is a large symphonic work for percussion and orchestra, and was premiered in February 2011 by the Brussels Philharmonic with Gert François as percussion soloist.

Medea for music theatre toured Belgium and the Netherlands in 2011–2013 with HERMESensemble and four actors of the Dutch Veenfabriek and Wim Henderickx as conductor.

His Symphony No. 1 "At the Edge of the World" was premiered by the National Orchestra of Belgium (NOB) in Luxemburg in 2012 with Stefan Blunier as conductor, and was performed with various orchestras in Brussels, Antwerp, Halle, and Magdeburg.

Within the International Society for Contemporary Music (ISCM) World Music Days 2012 in Antwerp and November Music in den Bosch, he conducted the premiere of Atlantic Wall with HERMESensemble, a work for mezzo-soprano, instrumental ensemble, video, and electronics.

In 2014 he composed Antifoon (A resonating bridge) for 500 musicians. He conducted the open air spectacle on a bridge between Hasselt and Genk. In May 2015, his large choral work Visioni ed Estasi premiered with 200 singers, both professional and amateurs, at the St. Rumbold's Cathedral, during the Flanders Festival in Mechelen with James Wood as the general conductor.

In March 2017 his Symphony No. 2 "Aquarius' Dream" was premiered with the Antwerp Symphony Orchestra, Claron McFadden, and Thierry Fischer as the conductor at the new Queen Elisabeth Hall in Antwerp. In April 2017 the music theatre production Revelations premiered at the Opera21 Festival in Antwerp with Muziektheater Transparant, Cappella Amsterdam, and the HERMESensemble.

His works are published by Norsk Musikforlag in Oslo, Norway.

== Recordings ==
Albums with music by Henderickx include:

- Raga I, II, III (1999)
- Confrontations for African and Western percussion (2004)
- Disappearing in Light, with HERMESensemble
- Tejas and Other Orchestral Works, performed by deFilharmonie and conducted by Martyn Brabbins
- Triptych, with HERMESensemble
- At the Edge of the World, with the Antwerp Symphony Orchestra, conducted by Brabbins and Edo de Waart.
- Patchwork (EtCetera KTC 1794 (2023)) includes a recording of Gishora by Peter Verhoyen (piccolo) and Pieterjan Vranckx (seven African drums)

== Awards ==
Henderickx received the Jeugd-en Muziekprijs Vlaanderen, the International Composition Prize for Contemporary Music in Quebec, Canada, and the triennial E. Baie I prize for a talented Flemish artist in 1999 from the province of Antwerp. He became the Arts Laureate of the Royal Flemish Academy of Belgium in 2002. In 2006 the Minister of Culture nominated him for the Flanders Culture Prize. He received the Lifetime Achievement Culture Prize in Lier in 2011. He was appointed a member of the Royal Flemish Academy of Belgium (KVAB) for Science and the Arts in 2015.
