= Will Lang Jr. =

American journalist (1914–1968)

Will Lang Jr. in Italy

William John Lang Jr. (October 7, 1914 – January 21, 1968) was an American journalist and a bureau head for Life magazine.

== Early career ==
Lang was born on the south side of Chicago. While attending the University of Chicago in 1936, he wrote for the Chicago Daily News and "campus stories" for Time on a part-time basis. Six months later, he was summoned to New York City to work for Time and Life on a regular basis. In both 1936 and 1940 he covered the Presidential campaigns of James Farley. While in Washington D.C., Lang met an old classmate, Kay Meyer (who later became Katharine Graham) of The Washington Post and Newsweek. The two dated for a while, but broke off the relationship due to conflicting interests.

In December 1940, Lang had an opportunity to get an interview with Massachusetts Congressman George Tinkham who showed Lang his trophies from his safaris in Kenya.

== World War II ==
During World War II, Lang became Bureau Head in Algiers, Italy, Paris, and Berlin. He also became friends with Bill Mauldin, Ernie Pyle, George Silk, John Steinbeck and Robert Capa. During the war, he wrote many biographies, including those of Lucian Truscott, Bill Mauldin, J. Elmer Spyglass, Creighton Abrams, and Canadian manufacturer Ludger Dionne.

Lang was the first American reporter in Tunis after the Battle of the Kasserine Pass. Later that same year, he followed the battle campaign of General George S. Patton in Sicily. On October 7, 1943, Lang was nearly killed in the Naples post office explosion. Later that month, he was commended by General Matthew B. Ridgway for his professionalism during his stay with the 82nd Airborne Division. It is said that General Ridgeway considered Lang to be an honorary member of the Division. After D-Day, he had lunch with Mary Welsh Hemingway, the 4th wife of Ernest Hemingway.

Later on, he filed a report on The Battle of the Bulge alongside Col. Creighton Abrams, in which Abrams later mentioned in an article of Stars and Stripes.

== Post-war ==
After the war, Lang continued his reporting in Europe and wrote reports on the rebuilding of Berlin and the fall of The Iron Curtain. During this time, in January 1948, his daughter Luisa was born. The Lang family's happiness was cut short in June when they heard of the Berlin Blockade. Lang was able to smuggle his family into France before the borders were closed.

In March 1950, one of his stories reported on the discovery of the coffins of German President Paul von Hindenburg and his wife, alongside Frederick William I of Prussia and Frederick the Great, in a salt mine in Germany.

When Lang returned to the United States in May 1950, he became Bureau Head in Boston, Massachusetts. In 1952, he wrote about John F. Kennedy becoming Senator of Massachusetts. From 1954 to 1960, he served as Bureau Head in Washington, D.C. After becoming Bureau Head in Paris in 1960, Lang traveled to Spain to help his old friend Ernest Hemingway publish The Dangerous Summer. Hemingway called it an addendum to Death in the Afternoon (1938). Hemingway persuaded Lang to let him print the manuscript, along with a picture layout, before it came out in hardcover. Although not a word of it was on paper, Hemingway agreed to the proposal. The first part of story appeared in Life on September 5, 1960, and was followed by two more installments.

In 1961 while in Berlin, Lang witnessed the construction of the Berlin Wall. When he returned home in 1961, he was promoted to Deputy Regional Bureau Director of Life. In February 1963, he was promoted to Chief Bureau Head of Domestic and Foreign Departments for Washington, D.C.'s Life branch. On June 26, 1963, Lang returned to Berlin for a few days and witnessed John F. Kennedy's "Ich bin ein Berliner" speech.

In January 1965, he was promoted to Chief Regional Bureau Director for Life in Manhattan.

Will Lang Jr. and his wife Louise and his daughter Luisa in Austria

Lang died from a heart attack while on a skiing trip with his family in St. Anton, Austria. His body was taken to Salzburg where it was cremated.
