= Collegium Vocale Gent =

Belgian musical ensemble

- Choir
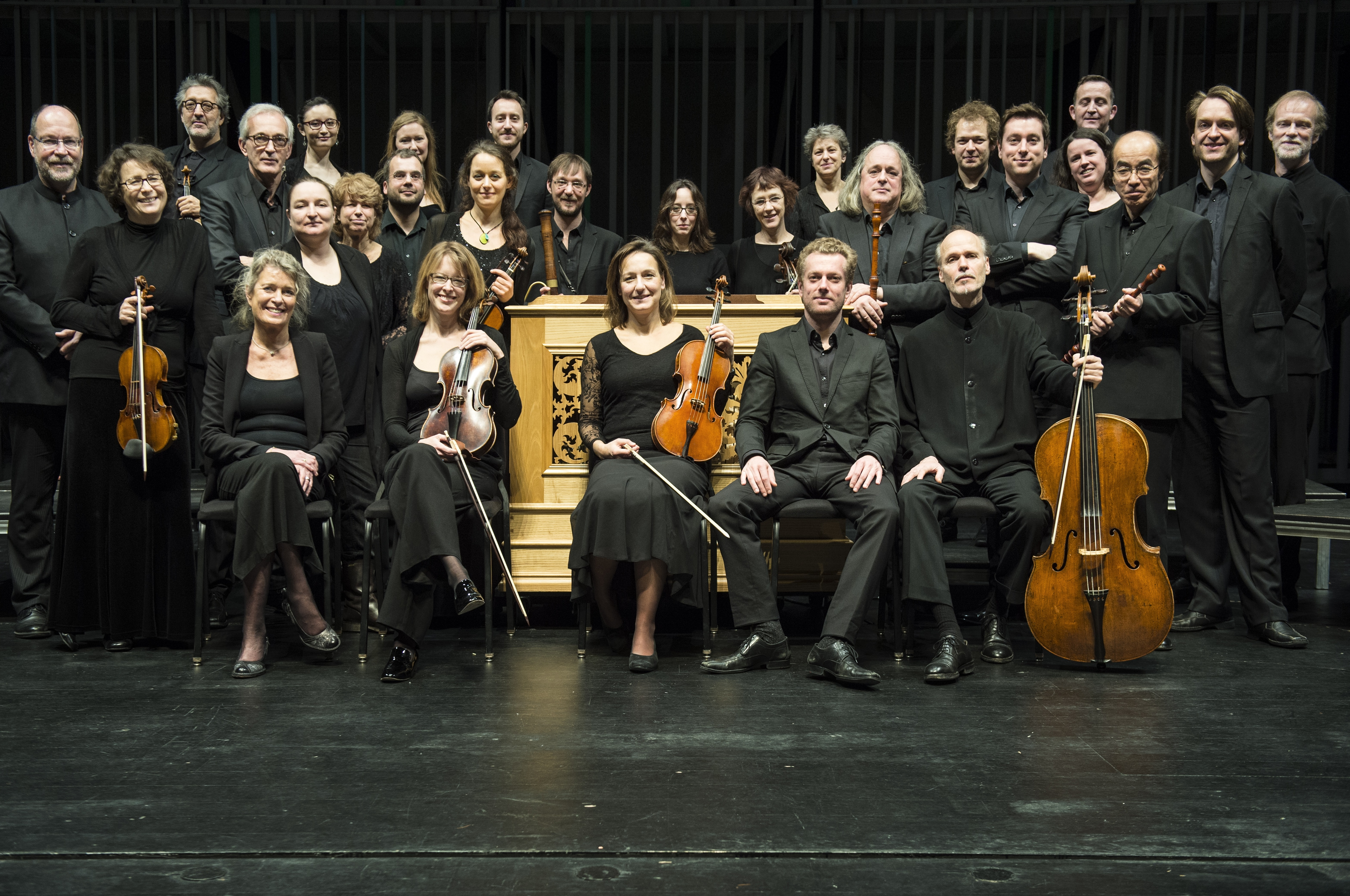
- Collegium Vocale Gent in 2015
- Founded: 1970
- Founder: Philippe Herreweghe
- Headquarters: Ghent, Belgium
- Website: www.collegiumvocale.com

Collegium Vocale Gent is a Belgian musical ensemble of vocalists and supporting instrumentalists, founded by Philippe Herreweghe. The group specializes in historically informed performance.

== Founding and program ==
Collegium Vocale Gent was founded in 1970 by a group of friends studying at the University of Ghent, on Philippe Herreweghe’s initiative. They were one of the first vocal ensembles to use new ideas about baroque performance practice. Their authentic, text-oriented and rhetorical approach gave the ensemble the transparent sound with which it would acquire world fame and perform at major concert venues and music festivals of Europe, Israel, the United States, Russia, South America, Japan, Hong Kong and Australia.

== Repertoire ==
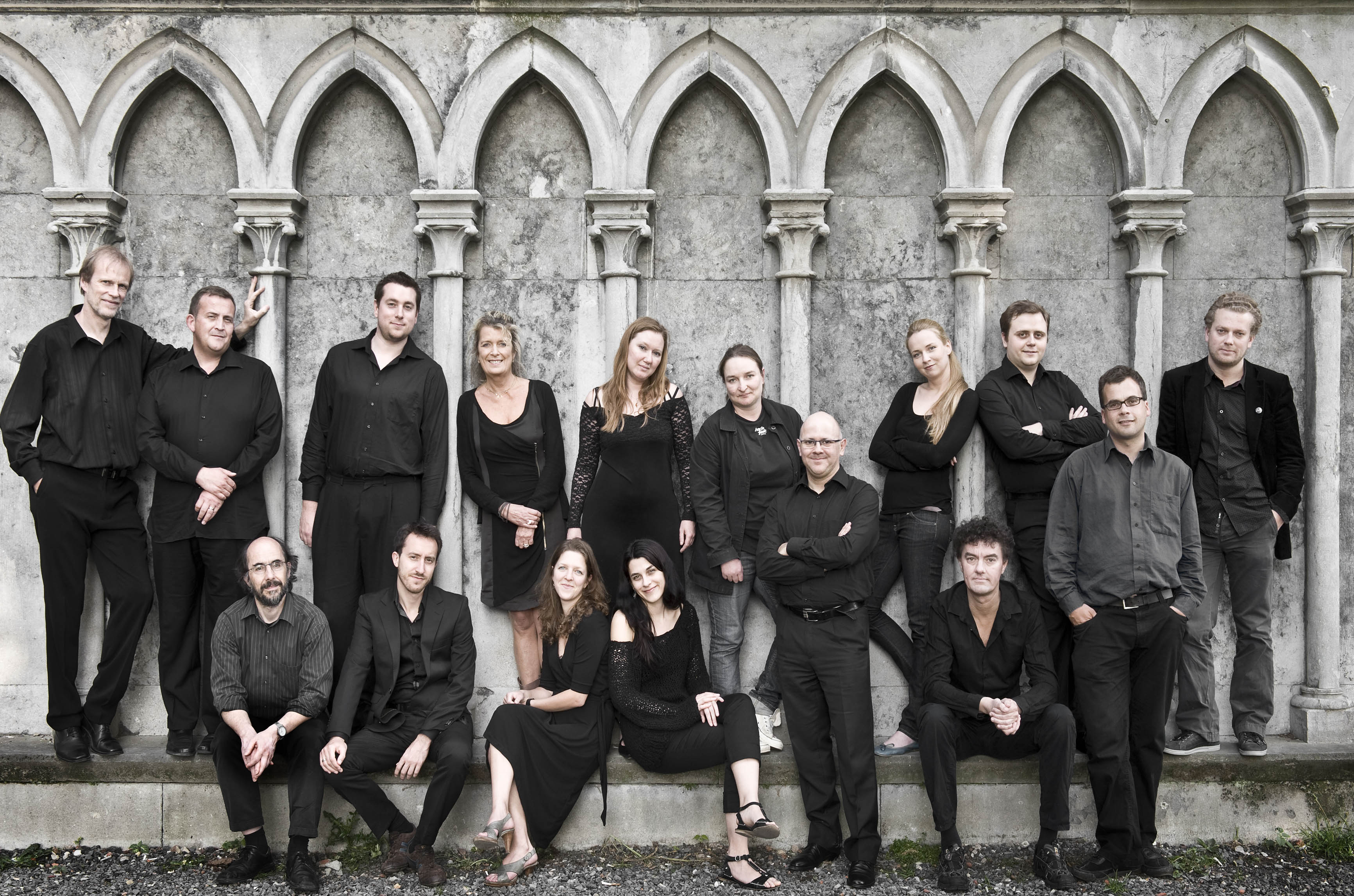
Collegium Vocale Gent in May 2011

Collegium Vocale Gent has grown organically into an ensemble whose wide repertoire encompasses a range of different stylistic periods. German Baroque music, particularly J. S. Bach’s vocal works, quickly became a speciality of the group. The group performs this music with a small ensemble in which the singers take both the chorus and solo parts. Collegium Vocale has specialized more and more in the Romantic, modern and contemporary oratorio repertoires. To this end, Collegium Vocale Gent enjoyed the support of the European Union’s Cultural Programme since 2011. The result is a shared symphonic choir recruiting singers from all of Europe, in which experienced singers perform alongside young talent. Moreover, Collegium Vocale Gent fulfils an important educational position.

== Collaboration ==
Besides using its own baroque orchestra, Collegium Vocale Gent has worked with several historically informed instrumental ensembles, including the Orchestre des Champs Elysées, Freiburger Barockorchester and Akademie für Alte Musik Berlin. It also works with prominent symphony orchestras such as deFilharmonie (Royal Flemish Philharmonic), the Rotterdam Philharmonic Orchestra, the Budapest Festival Orchestra and Amsterdam’s Royal Concertgebouw Orchestra. The ensemble has worked with Nikolaus Harnoncourt, Sigiswald Kuijken, René Jacobs, Paul Van Nevel, Iván Fischer, Marcus Creed, Kaspars Putnins, Yannick Nézet-Séguin and other leading conductors. The vocalists of Collegium Vocale Gent are trained by Christoph Siebert who has also conducted performances at international festivals.

Collegium Vocale Gent enjoys the financial support of the Flemish Community, the Province of East Flanders and the city of Ghent. From 2011-2013 the ensemble has been Ambassador of the European Union.

== Discography ==
Under Herreweghe’s direction, Collegium Vocale Gent has made more than 80 recordings, most of them with the Harmonia Mundi and Virgin Classics labels.These included twelve volumes of Bach cantatas in the 1990s.

In 2010, Philippe Herreweghe started his own label φ (phi) together with Outhere Music. Since then the following recordings were published:

- 2010
  - Mahler: Symphony No. 4 (LPH 001)
- 2011
  - Bach: Motets BWV 225–230 (LPH 002)
  - Brahms: Werke für Chor und Orchester (LPH 003)
  - Bach: Mass in B minor (LPH 004)
  - Victoria: Officium Defunctorum (LPH 005)
- 2012
  - Bach: Ach süßer Trost (LPH 006)
  - Beethoven:: Missa solemnis (LPH 007)
  - Dvořák: Stabat Mater (LPH 009)
  - Gesualdo: Responsoria 1611 (LPH 10)
- 2013
  - Bach: Ich elender Mensch – Leipzig Cantates (LPH 12)
  - Haydn: Die Jahreszeiten (LPH 13)
  - Byrd: Infelix ego, mass for five voices (LPH 14)
- 2014
  - Dvořák: Requiem (LPH 016)
  - Haydn: Die Schöpfung (LPH 018)
