= Arboretum Main-Taunus =

Arboretum in Hesse, Germany

Coordinates: 50°08′06″N 8°32′46″E

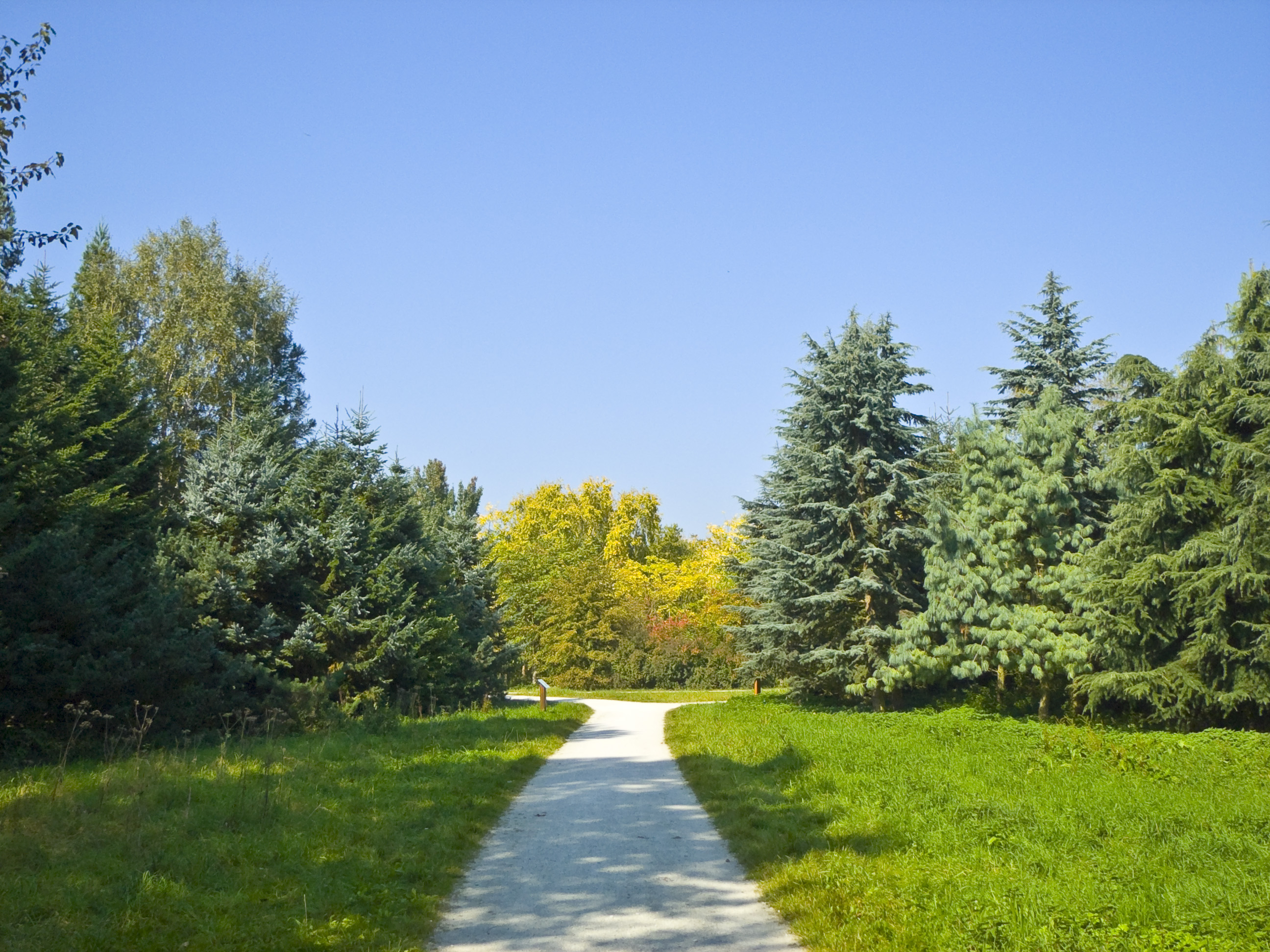
Arboretum Main-Taunus

The Arboretum Main-Taunus is an arboretum on an area of 76 hectares (190 acres) located southwest of Eschborn, Hesse, Germany. The arboretum lies close to Frankfurt am Main.

== History ==
The location of the arboretum was an airfield from 1937 to 1945 of the Luftwaffe. After World War II, it was used by the Americans, until Frankfurt Airport was reopened. The property was then owned by the Bundesrepublik Deutschland, und was used by Deutsche Bundespost and the Technisches Hilfswerk. In 1981, the state of Hesse acquired the land to use it for Ersatzaufforstung (replacement reforestation) for the enlargement of the airport.

The arboretum was planned to represent four different regions of the world in the temperate zone of the Northern Hemisphere:

- Western part of North America
- Eastern part of North America
- Asia (Japan, the Himalayas, China)
- Europe, Caucasus and Asia Minor

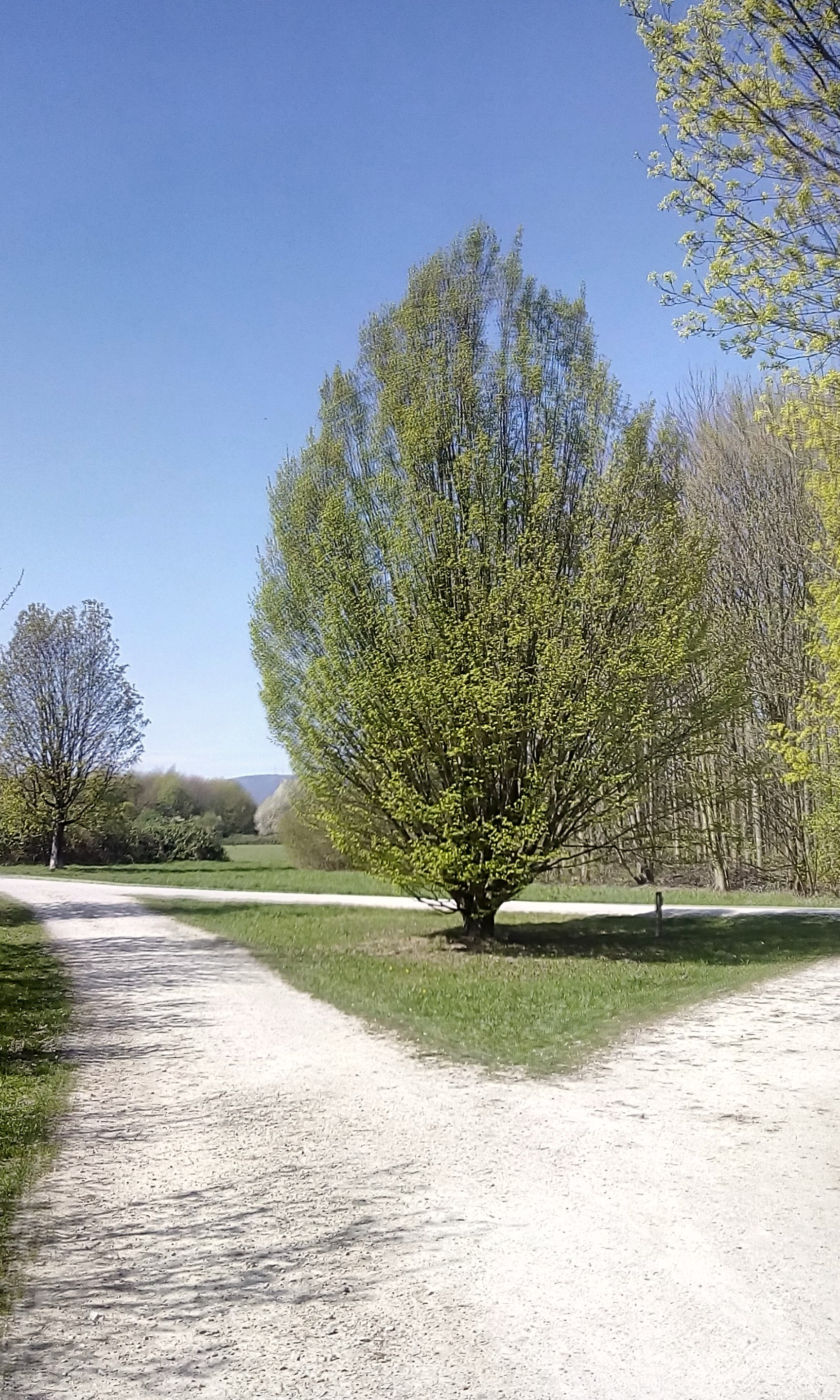
Hornbeam in the Arboretum Main-Taunus in early spring

The arboretum houses 600 different species of trees and bushes, not as single specimens as in some other arboreta, but grouped in forests and woodlands as they might grow in the regions. The 36 little forests are separated by meadows with fruit trees (Streuobstwiese) and flowering meadows. The park also features a Lehrpfad (educational path) for rocks, and another for local trees, as well as a wetland which is completely surrounded by plants for protection. A near-by farmer from Sulzbach uses some of the land with naturnah methods, and a bee-keeper installed bee-hives. The Southern Europe region is represented in 63 different trees and bushes. The park features 17 different oak trees.

Special trees are the North American redwoods, the trees with the largest mass, and the tree with the longest life expectancy, the bristlecone pine as well as the Chilean pine. The latter is the sole tree present in the arboretum originating from the Southern Hemisphere.
