= Spyglass (app) =

Mobile navigation and augmented reality application

- Developer: Pavel Ahafonau
- Release: October 5, 2009; 16 years ago
- Operating system: iOS, Android
- Type: Navigation software, augmented reality
- License: Proprietary software
- Website: happymagenta.com/spyglass/

Spyglass is a navigation and orientation mobile application that combines data from a digital compass, GNSS positioning, motion sensors, maps, and the device camera to provide direction finding, waypoint navigation, and measurement tools. The application is designed for offline and off-road use and is used in outdoor navigation, orientation tasks, astronomy, and fieldwork. It was first released on the Apple App store in 2009.

== History ==
Spyglass was created by independent software developer Pavel Ahafonau as a personal project in 2009, following the introduction of a digital compass sensor in the iPhone. It initially focused on combining compass, GPS, and camera data into an augmented-reality tool for navigation and orientation. In September 2009, a public prototype was demonstrated, showing a live camera view combined with a digital compass.

The application was released on the Apple App Store in October 2009. In February 2010, an update introduced target-based navigation, allowing to navigate to saved locations, bearings, and selected celestial objects. The update also added visual measurement tools, including an optical-style rangefinder, as well as a vertical speed indicator displaying ascent and descent rates derived from device sensor data. In December 2010, Spyglass was featured by Apple in iTunes Rewind 2010 under augmented-reality applications.

In 2021, navigation satellite tracking was introduced, allowing visualization and tracking of major GPS/GNSS satellite constellations. In July 2024, previously separate iOS editions (Spyglass, Commander Compass, and Commander Compass Go) were consolidated into a single Spyglass application. At the same time, the app transitioned to a freemium model.

== Features ==
Spyglass combines the device's compass, GNSS receiver, gyroscope, accelerometer, barometer, and camera to provide direction-finding, waypoint navigation, and measurement tools such as an altimeter, speedometer, rangefinder, and angular calculator. An augmented-reality mode overlays this sensor and navigation data, including heading, bearing, altitude, and distance to a target, onto the live camera view; the same data can also be shown over a map. Reviewers have particularly noted the app's heads-up display and its combination of measurement tools not typically found together in a single navigation app.

== Sources ==
- "The Story of Spyglass".
