= St. Pankratius, Schwalbach =

Coordinates: 50°08′58″N 8°32′09″E

St. Pankratius
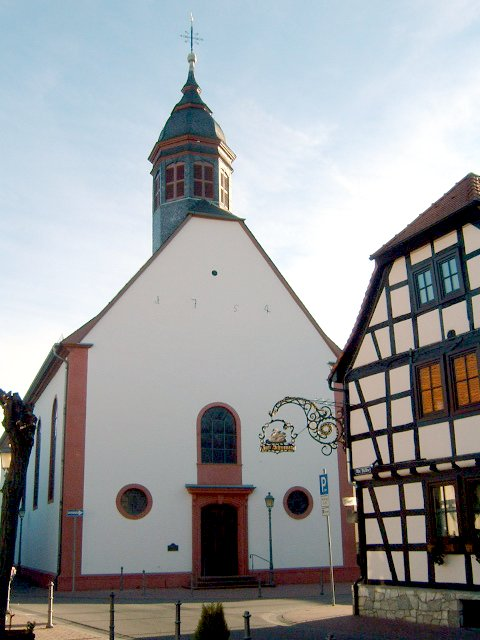

- Location: Schwalbach am Taunus, Hesse
- Country: Germany
- Denomination: Catholic
- Website: www.katholisch-schwalbach.de

Architecture
- Style: Baroque
- Completed: 1756

Administration
- Diocese: Limburg
- Parish: Katholische Kirchengemeinde Schwalbach

The Church of St. Pankratius is a parish church of the Roman Catholic parish of Schwalbach am Taunus, Hesse, Germany. It is also used as a concert venue.

The church was built from 1753 to 1756, and was dedicated to St. Pancras of Rome. In 2007 the parishes of St. Pankratius in Alt-Schwalbach and of St. Martin in Limesstadt were merged, but both churches main in use for worship.
