= Kammarensemblen =

Swedish chamber music ensemble

Kammarensemblen (KeN), is a Swedish chamber music ensemble. The group was created in Stockholm in 1984 and has today a big repertoar for small as well as big orchestras. The group is performing in Sweden as well as international festivals all over the world.

== History ==
- 2012: A cooperation with the Cullberg Ballet and Fotografiska museet

== Discography ==
- 1992: Kammarensemblen, The Swedish ensemble for new music (Phono Suecia PSCD 57). Ansgar Krook dirigerar verk av Anders Eliasson, Henrik Strindberg, Bengt Hambraeus, Gunnar Valkare och Lars Ekström.
