= Muziektheater Transparant =

Theatre company

Muziektheater Transparant is a Flemish theatre company founded in 1994. They produce music theatre and their own versions of operas. The artistic directors are Guy Coolen and Wouter Van Looy. Among the past and current composers in residence are Wim Henderickx, Jan Van Outryve, Eric Sleichim (of Bl!ndman), Liesa Van der Aa and Annelies Van Parys.

Transparant, which has its office and rehearsal room in Matterhorn (Antwerp), brings artists and ensembles together. It is strong internationally oriented and delivers productions with artistic and social relevance for a large audience.

== Productions ==
- The Lighthouse (1998) by Peter Maxwell Davies
- Manicuur (2001) by Jan Goovaerts and Pat Van Hemelrijck
- Il Re Pastore (2001) by Wolfgang Amadeus Mozart
- Ik Vlieg (2001) by Jan Van Outryve and Bas Teeken
- Little Orfeo (2002)
- Radio Ping-Pong (2002) by John Torso
- Carmen (2002) by Stef Kamil Carlens and Oscar Van Woensel
- Achilleus (2002) by Wim Henderickx and Imme Dros
- L'Arianna (2002) by Claudio Monteverdi
- Weisse Rose (2002) by Udo Zimmerman
- Zone Orfeo (2002) after Monteverdi
- Infito Nero (2002-2003) by Salvatore Sciarrino
- Antigona (2003) by Tommaso Traetta
- Sestina (2003) by Monteverdi
- Men in tribulation (2003) by Eric Sleichim and Jan Fabre
- Mr. Emmet takes a walk (2003) with Maxwell Davies and David Pountney
- Enoch Arden (2003) by Richard Strauss and Alfred Tennyson
- Dan ben ik straks zo'n diva (2003) after Strauss and George Frideric Handel
- Leven in hel (2003) by Ramsey Nasr and Joost Kleppe
- Drift (2003) after Monteverdi
- Peer Gynt (2003) by Edvard Grieg and Henrik Ibsen
- Einstein For Aliens (2003-2004) by David Moss and Hebbeltheater (Berlin)
- Ding (2004) by John Torso and Pat Van Hemelrijck
- Nest (2004)
- Jakob Lenz (2004) by Wolfgang Rihm after a libretto by Michael Fröhling based on Lenz by Georg Büchner
- Arthur / De Queeste (2004) by Jan Van Outryve
- Gli Amori d'Apollo e di Dafne (2004) by Francesco Cavalli and Giovanni Francesco Busenello
- Dido (2004) by Jan Van Outryve, Purni Morell and Wouter Van Looy
- The Medium (2004) by Maxwell Davies
- The Fairy Queen (2004) by Henry Purcell
- Arthur (2005) by Jan Van Outryve
- Von Tripp (2005) by Monteverdi
- Saulpain (2005) by G. F. Handel
- Opera langs de achterdeur (2005)
- Nada Brahma (2005) by Senjan Jansen and Oscar van den Boogaard
- Jullie die weten (2005) by Mozart and Stefan Hertmans
- Blauwbaards Burcht (2005) after Béla Bartók and Béla Balász
- De gelukkige prins (2006) after Franz Schubert, Mozart and Oscar Wilde
- Muziek Fabriek (2006) by Jan Van Outryve
- Intra-Muros [IM Pasolini] (2006) by Eric Sleichim and Peter Verhelst
- Het meisje de jongen de rivier (2006) by Jan Van Outryve, Paul Verrept and Wouter Van Looy
- Feedback (2006) by Bert Bernaerts
- Romeinse Tragedies (2006) by Eric Sleichim, William Shakespeare and Ivo Van Hove
- RUHE (2006) by Franz Schubert, Van Parys, Armando and Hans Sleutelaar
- La Mort de Sainte Alméenne / L'Ideé (2006) by Arthur Honegger and Max Jacob
- Een totale Entführung (2006) by Mozart, Wim Henderickx and Ramsey Nasr
- Babar/Le Fils des Etoiles (2007) after Francis Poulenc and Erik Satie
- Alles Liebe (2007) after Samson by G. F. Handel
- Waar is mijn ziel? (2007) by Monteverdi
- Villa Vivaldi (2007) by Jan Van Outryve after Antonio Vivaldi
- Void (2007) by Wim Henderickx, Hans Op de Beeck and Wouter Van Looy
- Wolpe! (2007) by Stefan Wolpe, Johan Bossers, Caroline Petrick and Viviane De Muynck
- (after) The Fairy Queen (2008) after Henry Purcell and William Shakespeare
- L'Esprit Messiaen (2008) by Olivier Messiaen
- Kafka Fragments (2008) after Gyorgy Kurtag and Franz Kafka
- Lamentations & Whispers (2008) by Orlandus Lassus, Joachim Brackx and Ramsey Nasr
- Pour vos beaux yeux (2008) by Joachim Brackx, Eric Sleichim, Jan Van Outryve and Van Parys
- An Index of Memories (2009) by Van Parys
- Century Songs (2009)
- Medea (2009) by Wim Henderickx, Peter Verhelst and Paul Koek
- Een nieuw Requiem (2009) by Mozart, Christian Köhler and Jeroen Brouwers
- Die Entführung aus dem Paradies (2009) by Joachim Brackx and Oscar van den Boogaard
- De legende van de witte slang (2009) with Shanghai Peking Opera Troupe
- Insect (2009) by Eric Thielemans
- Autopsie van een gebroken hart (2009) by An De Donder and Dominique Pauwels
- Over de bergen (2009) by Corrie van Binsbergen and Josse De Pauw
- Porselein (2009–2010) by Jan Van Outryve, Paul Verrept and Wouter Van Looy
- Orlando (2010) by Ludovico Ariosto, Vivaldi and Jan Van Outryve
- Een Oresteia (2010) by Iannis Xenakis and Van Parys
- L'Orfeo (2010) after Monteverdi
- Blond Eckbert (2010) by Judith Weir and Wouter Van Looy
- Utopia 47 (2010–2011) by Eric Sleichim
- Venus and Adonis (2011–2012)
- Opera Buffa (2011–2012)
- Pelléas et Mélisande (2011–2012)
- De waterafsluiter (2012–2013)
- Escorial (2012–2013)
- Koningin van de nacht (2012–2013)
- Lilith (2012–2013)
- O mio core (2012–2013)
- Songs of War (2012–2013)
- Territoria (2012–2013)
- De Koningin Zonder Land (2014-2015) Wim Henderickx and Wouter Van Looy
- Nightshade: Aubergine (2016-2017) with Claron McFadden
- Revelations (2017) Wim Henderickx and Wouter Van Looy
- Harriet (2018) by Hilda Paredes was given by in Huddersfield, UK. The libretto came from poetry by Mayra Santos-Febres and dialogue from Lex Bohlmeijer.
