= Consulate General of the United States, Frankfurt =

US consular post in Germany

Coordinates: 50°08′29″N 8°41′37″E

- US-Generalkonsulat Frankfurt
- Seal of the United States Department of State

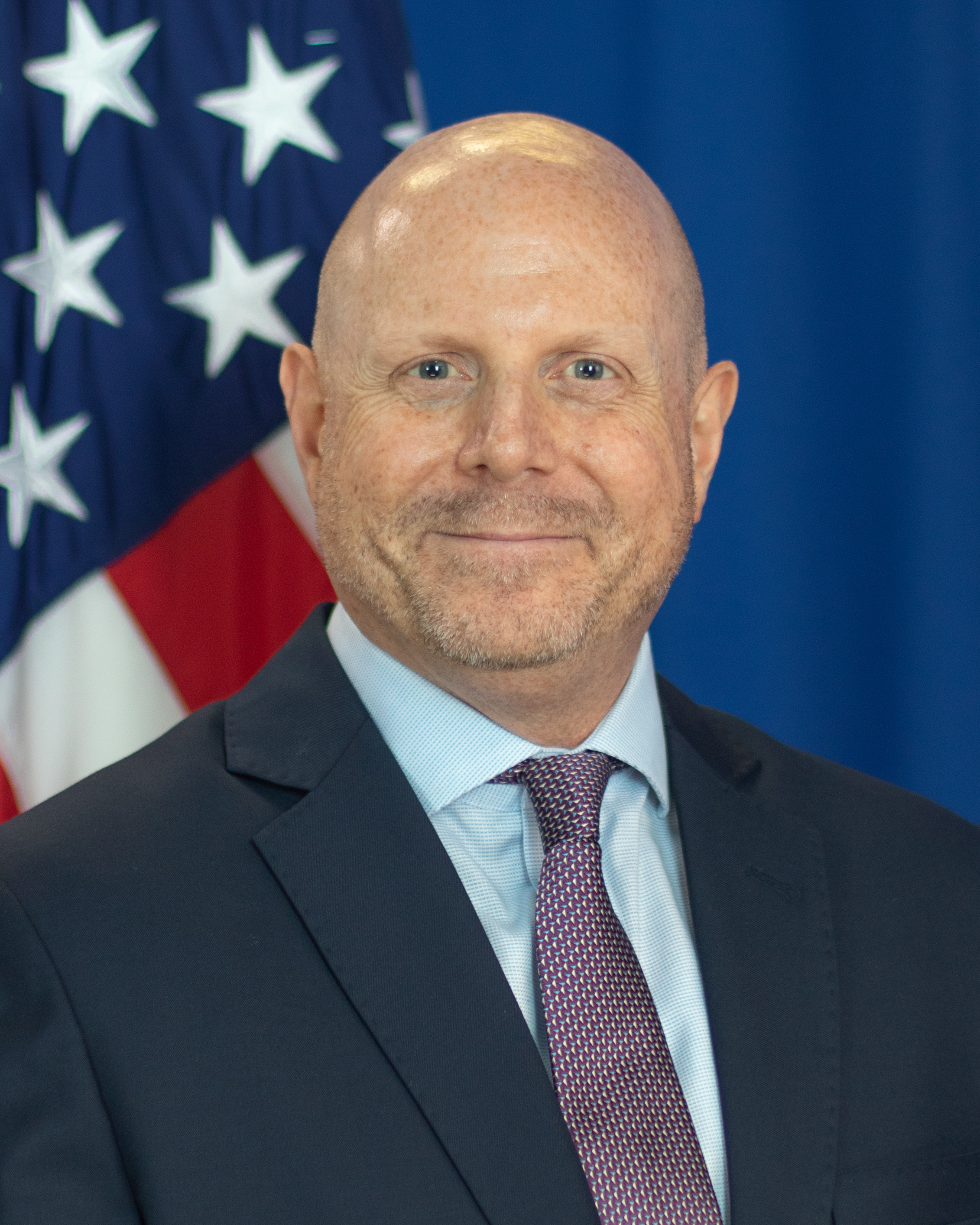
- Incumbent; Brian Heath since August 2024
- United States Department of State
- Style: Consul General
- Appointer: President of the United States
- Website: https://de.usembassy.gov/embassy-consulates/frankfurt/

The Consulate General of the United States in Frankfurt am Main represents the interests of the United States government in Frankfurt, Germany, and nearby surrounding areas. It is the largest Consulate General of the US. It is more extensive regarding personnel and facilities than many US embassies. Although technically a part of Mission Germany and reporting through the Embassy of the United States in Berlin, the Frankfurt Consulate General operates with a significant degree of autonomy compared to other U.S. Consulates. This is partly due to several large U.S. government regional centers housed within the Consulate, which provide support in security, construction, and financial matters to several other U.S Diplomatic posts located throughout Europe, the Middle East, and Africa.

In 2006 the Frankfurt Consulate General relocated almost all its operations to a single facility. The former 97th General Hospital, Frankfurt Army Regional Medical Center, was once operated by the U.S. military and before that by the German military during World War II. The refurbished and now modified building is quite large and expansive. The Frankfurt Consular district covers the German states of Hesse, Rhineland-Palatinate, Baden-Württemberg, and Saarland.

== Use by intelligence agencies ==
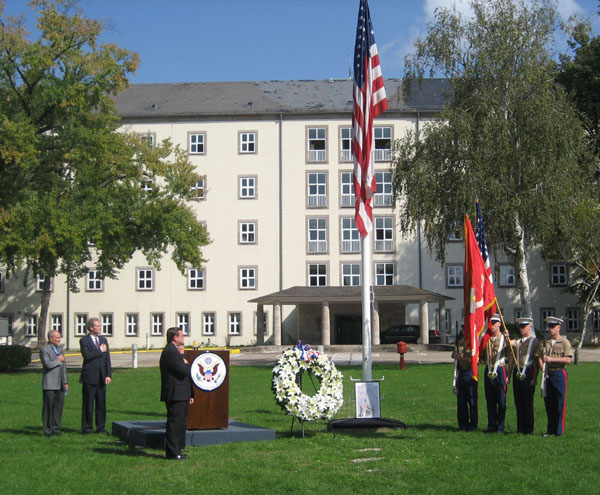
U.S. Consulate General Frankfurt in 2008, at which the memorial ceremony of September 11 attacks was taking place

In March 2017, a series of documents, referred to as Vault 7, revealed that the US government uses the consulate as a base for cyber operations. This diplomatic representation was the largest US consulate worldwide regarding personnel and facilities and has played a prominent role in the US government's intelligence architecture for years. The intelligence personnel, including CIA agents, NSA spies, military secret service personnel, the US Department of Homeland Security employees, and the Secret Service employees are working in the building complex with high walls and barbed wire in the north of the city. In a radius of about 40 kilometers around Frankfurt, the Americans had established a dense network of outposts and shell companies in Frankfurt. Vault 7 documents reveals the Frankfurt hackers, part of the Center for Cyber Intelligence Europe (CCIE), were given cover identities and diplomatic passports to obfuscate customs officers to gain entry to Germany. The CIA station, in the consulate, is said to also collect Iranian intelligence in Europe, surveil on Iranian officials and target possible defectors who work in Iran's nuclear weapons program.
