= Reiner (given name) =

Reiner is a given name. Notable people with this name include:

- Reiner Braun (born 1952), German journalist, historian and peace activist
- Reiner Bredemeyer (1929−1995), German composer
- Reiner Brockmann (1609−1647), Estonian clergyman, ceremonial poet and translator
- Reiner Calmund (born 1948), German football executive
- Reiner Castro (born 1994), Venezuelan footballer
- Reiner Dennewitz (born 1937), German composer
- Reiner Dierksen (1908–1943), German navy officer
- Reiner Edelmann (born 1965), German footballer
- Reiner Ferreira (born 1985), Brazilian footballer
- Reiner Frieske (born 1940), German handball player
- Reiner Fuellmich (born 1958), German former lawyer
- Reiner Ganschow (born 1945), German handball player
- Reiner Geye (1949–2002), German footballer
- Reiner Gies (born 1963), German boxer
- Reiner Goldberg (1939–2023), German opera singer
- Reiner Grundmann (born 1955), German sociologist
- Reiner Hanschke (1940–2015), German field hockey player
- Reiner Haseloff (born 1954), German politician
- Reiner Heugabel (born 1963), German wrestler
- Reiner Hollich (born 1955), German footballer
- Reiner Hollmann (born 1949), German football manager and former player
- Reiner Klimke (1936–1999), German equestrian
- Reiner Knizia (born 1957), German board game designer
- Reiner Kontressowitz (born 1942), German musicologist and lyricist
- Reiner Kossmann (1927–2013), German ice hockey player
- Reiner Kruecken, German nuclear physicist
- Reiner Kümmel (born 1939), German physicist
- Reiner Kunze (born 1933), German writer and GDR dissident
- Reiner Kurth (born 1951), German sprint canoeist
- Reiner Leist (born 1964), German-American photographer
- Reiner Lemoine (1949–2006), German entrepreneur
- Reiner Margreiter (born 1975), Austrian luger
- Reiner Maurer (born 1960), German football coach and former player
- Reiner Merkel (1952–2007), German photojournalist
- Reiner Methe (1964–2011), German handball referee
- Reiner Michalke (born 1956), German artistic director and jazz musician
- Reiner Modest (born 1949), Danish rower
- Reiner E. Moritz (born 1938), German film director and producer
- Reiner Plaßhenrich (born 1976), German footballer
- Reiner Pommerin (1943–2024), German historian
- Reiner Protsch (born 1939), German anthropologist
- Reiner Salzer (born 1942), German chemist
- Reiner Schilling (1943–2013), German wrestler
- Reiner Scholl (born 1961), German sprint canoeist
- Reiner Schöne (born 1942), German actor
- Reiner Schürmann (1941–1993), Dutch-American philosopher and professor
- Reiner Schwarz (1948–2014), Canadian radio and television personality
- Reiner Stach (born 1951), German author, biographer, publisher, and publicist
- Reiner Stahel (1892–1955), German military officer
- Reiner Stenzel (1940–2023), American plasma physicist and professor
- Reiner Sturm (1950–2003), German murderer
- Reiner Süß (1930–2015), German singer, entertainer and politician
- Reiner Thoni (born 1984), Canadian ski mountaineer
- Reiner Trik (born 1963), German wrestler
- Reiner Uthoff (1937–2024), German writer and stage director
- Reiner von Meissen (died 1066), German bishop
- Reiner Tom Zuidema (1927–2016), Dutch-American anthropologist
