= Lommatzsch Libelle =

German single-seat glider, 1957

Lommatzsch 58/II Libelle
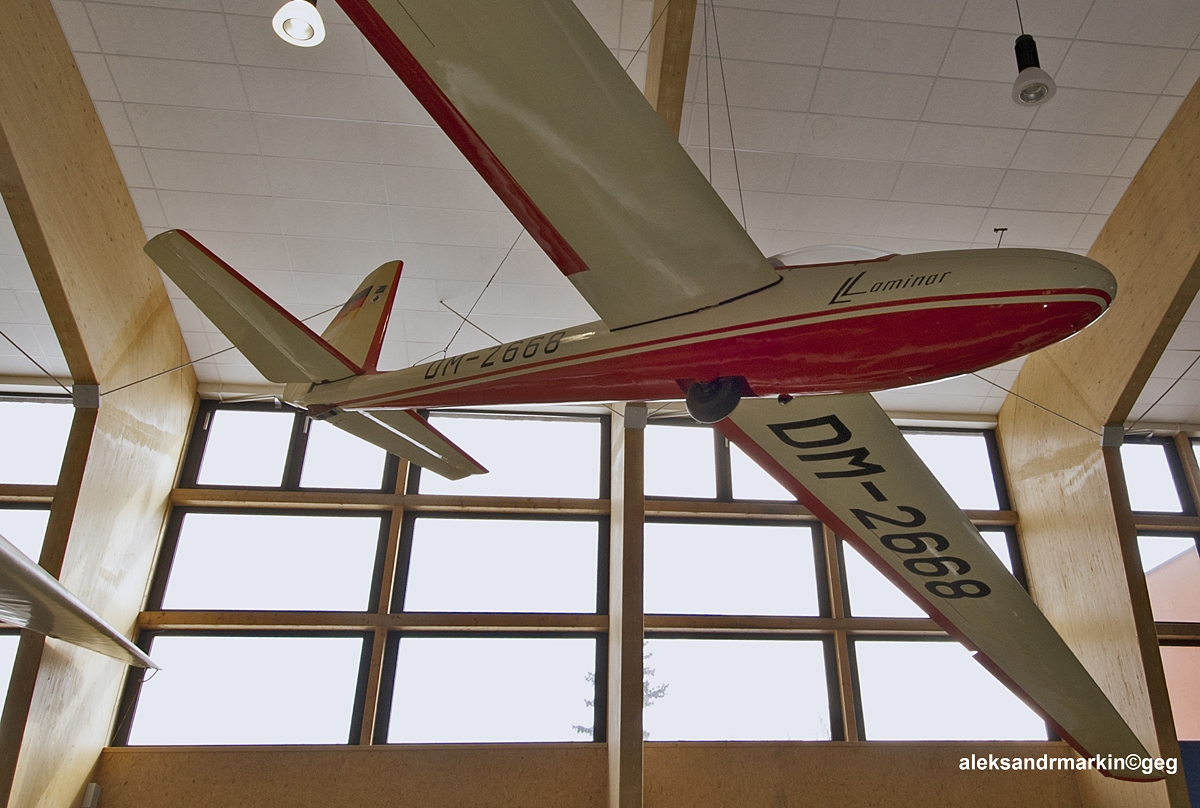
- Lommatzsch 58/II Libelle-Laminar

General information
- Type: Advanced training and aerobatic glider
- National origin: GDR
- Manufacturer: VEB Apparatebau Lommatszch (VBAL)
- Designer: Heinz Roessing and Prof Landmann
- Number built: about 110

History
- Introduction date: 1957
- First flight: 13 February 1957
- Retired: 1987

The Lommatzsch Libelle or VBAL Libelle was an advanced, high performance training glider built in the GDR in the 1950s. There were several variants and over 100 were built.

== Design and development ==
The Foreign Trade Bank of the USSR was responsible for funding for aircraft development centres in the GDR, including the factory at Lommatzsch which was responsible for glider design and production and was known as VEB Apparatebau Lommatzsch or VBAL. In 1955 they began the design of a single seat, high performance, wooden glider capable of providing training in advanced soaring and basic aerobatics. The first prototype, the VBAL 55 Libelle (Dragonfly) or Lom 55 V1 for short, had a butterfly tail and was first flown 13 February 1957 by Karl Treuter. The V2 had a similar tail and was used for stress testing. Flight testing led to production variants with conventional tails. The Lom 55 and three of its five production variants had a wingspan of 16.50 m (54 ft 2 in) but the Lom 58 and 58/I were Standard Class gliders with 15.00 m (49 ft 3 in) spans. The final variant, the Lom 58/II, had a 16.50 m (54 ft 2 in) span laminar flow wing.

The wood and fabric Libelle had a two-piece, mid-mounted, single spar wing of trapezoidal plan out to slightly blunted tips, apart from those of the two Standard class variants which ended in salmon tip fairings. The wing was plywood-covered ahead of the spar, forming a torsion resistant D-box, and fabric-covered behind. Exceptionally, the laminar flow wing of the Lom 58/II was dural-foil covered. The ailerons of this variant were single-piece but on all others they were divided. Three variants, the Lom 57/I, 58/I and 58/II, had flaps. All variants had spoilers.

Apart from the two V-tailed prototypes, all Libelles had very similar fuselages. These were built in two parts, wooden-framed and fabric covered forwards and a ply-skinned monocoque, circular section rear. The fin and broad rudder was largely straight-edged, though blunted at the top and rounded near the rudder base. The tailplane, mounted on top of the fuselage and at its end, was trapezoidal in plan apart from blunted tips and carried narrow, tapered elevators. Fixed tail surfaces were ply-covered and control surfaces fabric-covered. The Libelle landed on a rubber-sprung, semi-recessed, fixed monowheel located ahead of the wing trailing edge, assisted by a short skid under the nose and a small tailskid.

== Operational history ==
The first two production Libelles were accepted in August 1958 and the final production total was about 110. Most numerous were the Standard Class variants, of which about 70 were built. Libelles were prominent in national gliding contests; 17 out of 37 contestants flew them in 1959 at the first of these, including the winner, Manfred Blauer. The laminar-wing versions, of which 22 were built, also set national speed and distance records.

The last Libelle in the GDR was retired in 1987.

== Variants ==
Lom 55
Prototypes. Two built for flight (V-1 and V-3) and another, V-2, for stress testing. V-1 had a V-tail; first flown 13 February 1957. V-3, first flown June 1957, had a conventional crucifix tail, as did all production variants.
Lom 57
First production type. Length 6.80 m (22 ft 4 in). First flown June 1957.
Lom 57/I
Length 6.60 m (21 ft 8 in). Monowheel fairing introduced and used on later variants. Together, 13 Lom 57s and 57/Is built.
Lom 57/II
Project only, 19 m (62 ft 4 in) span.
Lom 58
Standard class Libelle with 15 m (49 ft 3 in) span. Fuselage as Lom 57.
Lom 58/I
Standard class, wing as Lom 58. Length 6.60 m (21 ft 8 in). First flew 27 February 1959. About 70 Lom 58s and 58/Is built.
Lom 58/II
Laminar wing. Length 6.60 m (21 ft 8 in). 22 built.

== Aircraft on display ==
Though several airframes survive only 58/II Libelle Laminar DM-2668, in the Deutsches Segelflugmuseum mit Modellflug on the Wasserkuppe, is on public display.

== Specifications (Lom-58/I Libelle Standard) ==
Data from The World's Sailplanes vol II (1963)

General characteristics

- Crew: One
- Length: 6.60 m (21 ft 8 in)
- Wingspan: 15.0 m (49 ft 3 in)
- Wing area: 13.76 m^{2} (148.1 sq ft)
- Aspect ratio: 16.35
- Airfoil: root Göttingen Gö 549 mod.; mid Göttingen Gö 549 : tip Göttingen Gö 549 mod.
- Empty weight: 210 kg (463 lb) equipped
- Gross weight: 300 kg (661 lb)
- Dihedral: 3°

Performance

- Stall speed: 50 km/h (31 mph, 27 kn)
- Never exceed speed: 200 km/h (120 mph, 110 kn) placard, smooth air
- Max rough air speed: 130 km/h (81 mph; 70 kn)
- Maximum aero tow speed: 130 km/h (81 mph; 70 kn)
- Maximum winch speed: 100 km/h (62 mph; 54 kn)
- g limits:

- 4.45g at 154 km/h (96 mph; 83 kn)
- 4.45g at 233 km/h (145 mph; 126 kn)
- —2.23g at 224 km/h (139 mph; 121 kn)
- —2.23g at 194 km/h (121 mph; 105 kn)

- Maximum glide ratio: 28.5 at 78.5 km/h (48.8 mph; 42.4 kn) (best L/D)
- Rate of sink: 0.73 m/s (144 ft/min) at 74 km/h (46 mph; 40 kn) (minimum)
- Wing loading: 21.8 kg/m^{2} (4.5 lb/sq ft)
