= Tobias Haslinger =

Austrian composer (1787–1842)

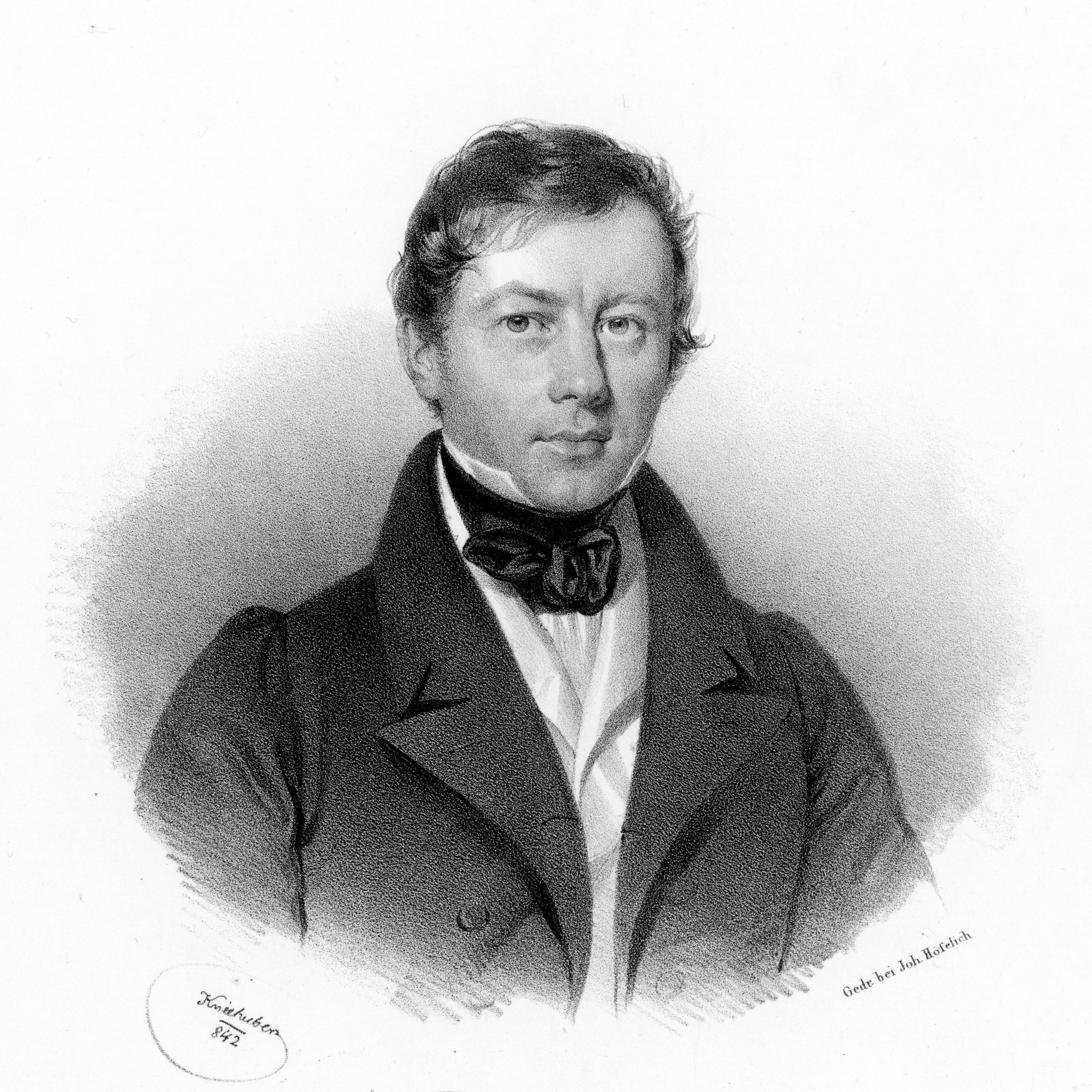
- Tobias Haslinger by Joseph Kriehuber
- Born: 1 March 1787
- Died: 18 June 1842 (aged 55)
- Occupations: Composer and music publisher

Signature
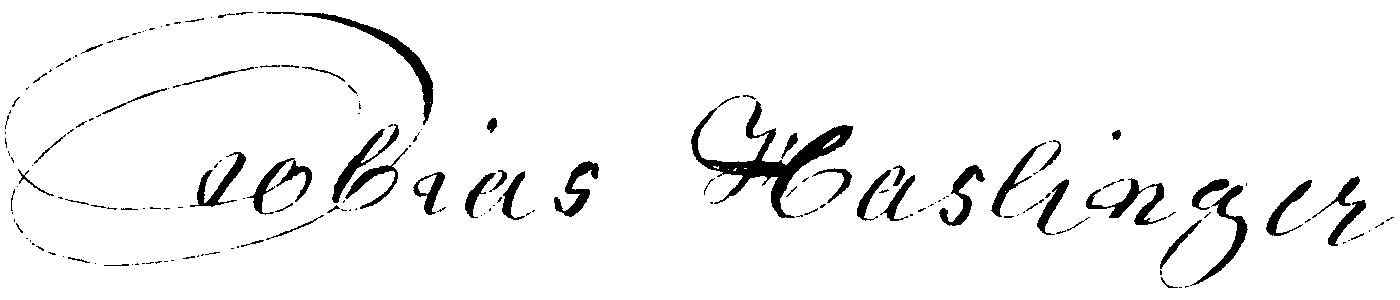

Tobias Haslinger (1 March 1787 - 18 June 1842) was an Austrian composer and music publisher. He published works by composers including, among others, Beethoven, Liszt, Berlioz, Bendel, Mozart, Schubert, Hummel, Weber, Strantz, and Chopin.
