= Robert Scholtz =

Robert Scholtz may refer to:

- Robert A. Scholtz, professor of electrical engineering
- Robert Friedrich Karl Scholtz, German painter, graphic artist and draughtsman
- Bob Scholtz (Robert Joseph Scholtz), American football offensive lineman

== See also ==
- Robert Scholz (disambiguation)
