= Leo Kestenberg =

German-Israeli pianist, music educator, and cultural politician

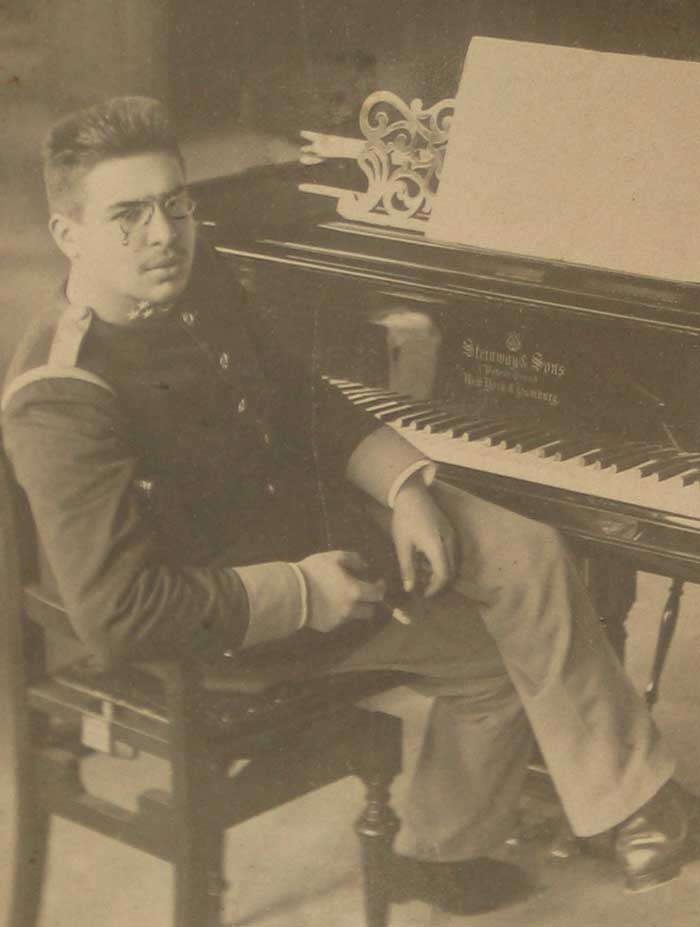
- Leo Kestenberg at the piano in 1905
- Born: 27 November 1882; Ružomberok, Kingdom of Hungary
- Died: 13 January 1962 (aged 79); Tel Aviv, Israel
- Occupations: Classical pianist; Music educator; Cultural politician
- Organizations: Musikhochschule Berlin; International Society for Music Education

Leo Kestenberg (27 November 1882 – 13 January 1962) was a German-Israeli classical pianist, music educator, and cultural politician. Working for the government in Prussia from 1918, he began a large-scale reform of music education (Kestenberg-Reform) which aimed to teach music to all, beginning with small children, and including the education of their teachers. In exile in Prague, he was instrumental in forming the and administrating the first international organization for music education, which became ISME. He fled Nazi Germany in 1933 and later moved to Mandatory Palestine, where he founded a seminary for music teachers and privately taught pianists such as Menahem Pressler and Alexis Weissenberg.

== Life and work ==
=== Childhood and education ===
Kestenberg was born the son of a Hungarian–Jewish hazzan in Ružomberok, then in the Kingdom of Hungary under the rule of the Habsburg monarchy. When he was four years old, the family moved to Prague and from there to Liberec two years later. Kestenberg received his first piano lessons from his father, then in 1894/95 from music director Gustav Albrecht in Zittau. After graduating from the Progymnasium, Kestenberg completed his schooling with the Mittlere Reife. At the age of 15, he began to study piano in Berlin with Franz Kullak. In 1898 he met Ferruccio Busoni, which led to an intimate friendship with him and his family, regarded as a turning point in his artistic life. After piano studies with José Vianna da Motta, Hermann Scholtz and Felix Draeseke, Kestenberg attended a master class by Busoni in Weimar in 1900 which introduced him to music by Bach, Schumann and above all Liszt. He joined the military band in Josefstadt the same year and began his concert career in Reichenberg as soloist in Liszt's First Piano Concerto. He became musical adviser to the Volksbühne Berlin, and a piano teacher at both the Stern Conservatory and the Klindworth-Scharwenka Conservatory. He began serving on the educational committee of the Independent Social Democratic Party of Germany (USPD), which he had joined in 1900, publishing in the Sozialistische Monatshefte.

=== Berlin ===
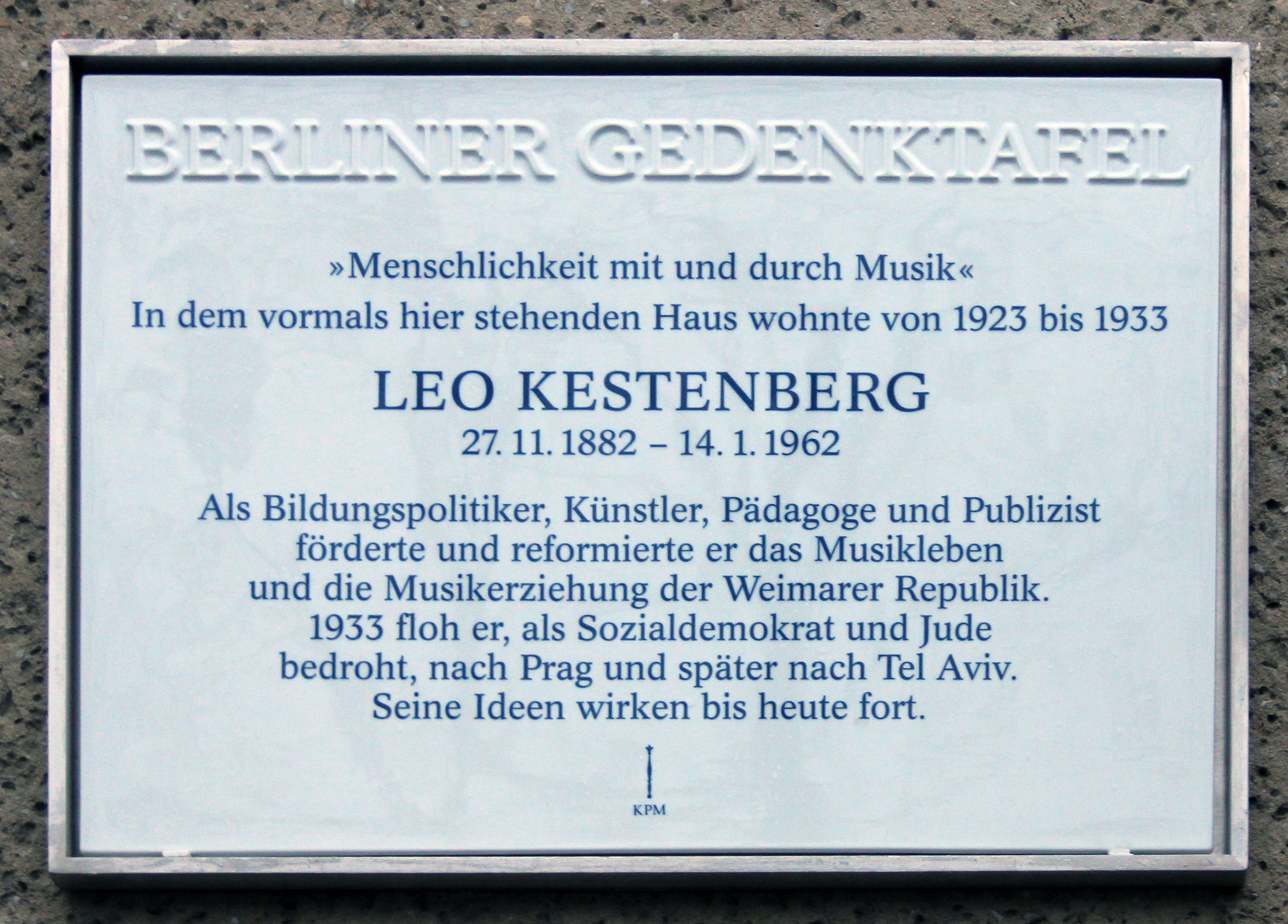
Berlin memorial plaque, Barstraße 12 in Berlin-Wilmersdorf

In January 1906, Kestenberg gave his first piano recital in Berlin and became a sought-after and celebrated Liszt interpreter.

In 1908, he married Grete Kussel; they had two daughters. He began his professional career as a concert pianist, which led to professorship in piano at the Musikhochschule Berlin from 1921 to 1929. He continued his cultural-political commitment, organising numerous artistic events within the framework of the USPD's workers' associations and trade unions in the Freie Volksbühne Berlin and the Workers' Singers' Association, in an effort to democratising the arts. He was involved in the popular education project of the Kroll Opera from 1927 to 1930, in Paul Cassirer's art magazine Der Bildermann in 1916, and supported the Commission for Exemplary Workers' Furniture in 1912.

In 1918, Kestenberg joined the Prussian Ministry of Culture as a research assistant, was appointed advisor to the art department in 1920 and headed the music department of the Zentralinstitut für Erziehung und Unterricht (Central Institute for Education and Instruction). Here he not only supported the modernisation and professionalisation of school music education, but also directed the entire Prussian appointment policy for the Berlin theatres and orchestras. In his paper Musikerziehung und Musikpflege (1921), he established for the first time an overall educational plan from kindergarten to university, and for the popular cultivation of music, which then formed the basis for the "Denkschrift über die gesamte Musikpflege in Schule und Volk" (1923) requested by the Prussian parliament. With the support of the non-party Minister of Culture Carl Heinrich Becker, he was able to implement essential educational policy reforms in Prussia (Kestenberg-Reform). The reform was gradually implemented in the form of decrees. In 1929 he was appointed a Ministerial Councilor. However, only a few days after his 50th birthday, Kestenberg was dismissed from all positions for political reasons on 1 December 1932.

==== Kestenberg decrees ====
- Prüfung, Ausbildung und Anstellung der Musiklehrer an den höheren Lehranstalten in Preußen (Examination, training and employment of music teachers at the higher educational institutions in Prussia)
- Privatunterricht in der Musik (Private lessons in music)
- Schulmusikunterricht in Preußen (School music lessons in Prussia)

=== Prague ===
Immediately after the seizure of power by the Nazis, Kestenberg first emigrated to Prague in 1933, where he was able to reactivate his Czechoslovak citizenship. He soon established contacts with the foreign minister Kamil Krofta and with German émigré circles (Oskar Kokoschka, Willy Haas, Ernst Bloch, Golo Mann) and the Prague born Max Brod. He found himself caught between the fronts of the rather nationalistic Czech musical education in contrast to the simultaneously existing tendency of an increasing international opening. When the Society for Music Education was founded in Prague in 1934, he took over the leadership of the section for international relations. Kestenberg was also involved in the "Fachgruppe ehemaliger reichsdeutscher Pädagogen", which was affiliated to the Verband deutscher Lehreremigranten.

In the autumn of 1938, Kestenberg was again forced to flee from the Nazis and came to Paris, where he tried, with the help of friends and colleagues, to continue the "International Society for Music Education" founded in Prague. The increasingly threatening political situation in Europe prompted him to emigrate again at the end of 1938, moving to Tel Aviv.

=== Tel Aviv ===
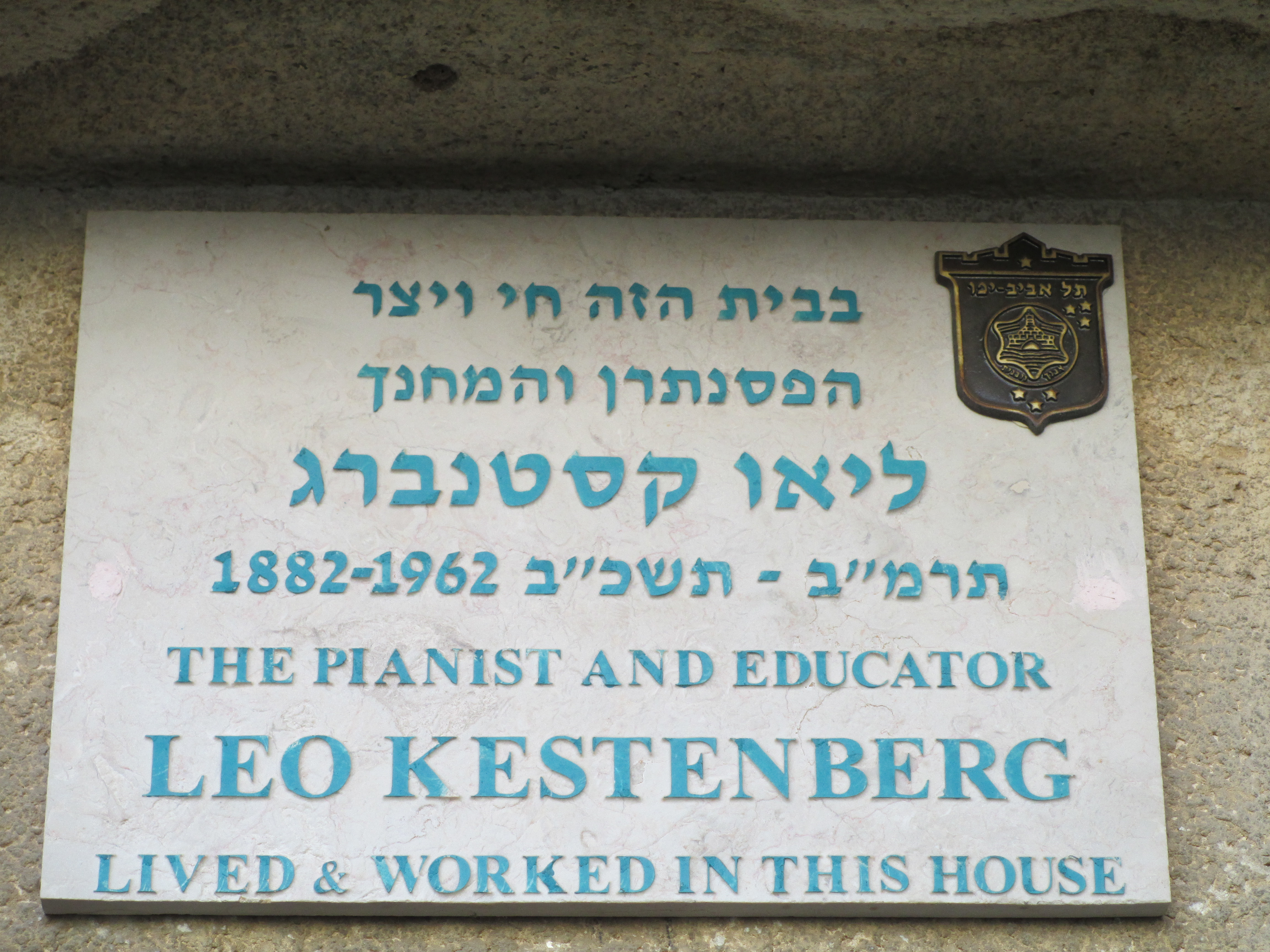
Memorial plaque for Leo Kestenberg on the house where he lived in Tel Aviv (Adam HaCohen Street 20)

In Tel Aviv, he first became general manager of the Palestine Orchestra, which had been founded by Heinrich Simon and the violinist Bronisław Huberman with immigrant musicians. This purely administrative task was alien to his creative spirit and educational politic intentions. After six years he gave up the position and focused on music pedagogical work, establishing a general music education centre. The most important result of this effort was the founding of a seminary for music educators (Midrasha le mechanchim leMusica) in 1945, which continued as an independent music teacher college. It was absorbed into the Levinsky College of Education in Tel Aviv in the 1980s which still exists. He retired from the seminary in 1952. Due to progressive blindness from 1953, he turned to teaching piano students privately, including Menahem Pressler, Alexis Weissenberg, Hadassah Brill, Rina Braverman and Ricci Horenstein. In 1953 he was elected the first honorary president of the newly founded International Society for Music Education (ISME), for his services to music education. He visited Berlin and Badenweiler the same year.

He died in Tel Aviv at age 79 following a bout of angina pectoris.

== Honours ==
In recognition of his lifetime achievements, the music school of the Berlin district of Tempelhof-Schöneberg bears the name "Leo Kestenberg Music School".

On the occasion of the 80th anniversary of the founding of the Society for Music Education in Prague, the music school held a benefit concert as the Leo Kestenberg Project in the Chamber Music Hall of the Berlin Philharmonie on 25 March 2014.

On 27 November 2017, a Berlin memorial plaque was unveiled at his former residence, Berlin-Wilmersdorf, Barstraße 12.

The musicologist Wilfried Gruhn founded the Internationale Leo Kestenberg Gesellschaft in 2009, an international society researching his life and work, and having published his writings in six volumes until 2013.

== Publications ==
- Leo Kestenberg: Gesammelte Schriften in 4 Bänden und 2 Teilbänden. Edited by Wilfried Gruhn, Freiburg 2009–2013.
- Leo Kestenberg (ed.): Kunst und Technik. Berlin 1930, renewed by epOs-Music, Osnabrück 1999
- Leo Kestenberg: Musikerziehung und Musikpflege. Leipzig 1921, online in the Deutsche Nationalbibliothek
- Ph. A. Maxwell (ed.): Leo Kestenberg & Franz W. Beidler, Complete Correspondence 1933–1956, online press 2013
