= Louise Strantz =

German composer, poet and singer

Louise Tippelskirch Strantz (2 March 1823 - 8 January 1909) was a German composer, poet and singer.

Strantz was born in Dusseldorf to Lieutenant General Ernst Ludwig von Tippelskirch, commandant of Berlin and commander of the Royal Prussian State Gendarmerie.

She studied music with Constanze Blank, Jaehns, and Pax. She married Adolf von Strantz, and they moved to Berlin in 1842, where she lived until her death in 1909. Strantz received favorable reviews in Vienna in 1852 when she sang in Giacomo Meyerbeer’s opera Le Prophete. She was scheduled to make her debut in London in 1853.

Composer Franz Bendel based his Wiegenlied on a text by Strantz. Strantz’s music was published by Bote & Bock, Hermann, and Tobias Haslinger. Her compositions included:

== Piano ==
- Einzugs Marsch
- Fest - Walzer
- Flora Polka
- Friedens Marsch
- Konig Marsch
- Reverie
- Santa Lucia Marsch
- Schneeflocken Waltz
- Victoria Walzer
- Wilhelm - Marsch

== Vocal ==
- “Anna Polka”
- Cantata: Des Kaiser's Ruh 'schütz'
- “Klage dem Liebchen”
- Zwei Lieder
