= Solon SE =

Former German solar energy company

- Type: Societas Europaea
- ISIN: DE0007471195
- Industry: Solar energy
- Predecessor: Solon AG für Solartechnik
- Founded: Berlin, Germany (27 November 1997)
- Key people: Thomas Krupke (CEO), Dr. Lars Podlowski (CTO), Dr. Gero Wiese (COO), Anke Hunziger (CHRO), Simone Prüfer (CFO)
- Products: Solar panels, Solon mover
- Revenue: 2008: €815,1 million (2007: €503.1 million)
- Net income: 2008: €30,9 million (2007: €22,2 million)
- Number of employees: 943 (2008)
- Website: www.solon.com

Solon SE was a German solar energy company with headquarters in Berlin. Solon SE produced photovoltaic modules at its production sites in Greifswald (Germany, SOLON Nord GmbH), Steinach in Tirol (Austria, SOLON Hilber Technologie GmbH), Carmignano di Brenta (Italy, SOLON S.p.A., formerly known as S.E. Project s.r.l.), Tucson (USA, SOLON Corporation) and Berlin (Germany, SOLON Photovoltaik GmbH). Solon also offered turn-key solar power plants, projected by SOLON Inverstments (Freiburg, Germany) and Inverters, developed and produced by SOLON Inverters AG (Uznach, Switzerland, formerly known as asp AG).

In 2008 Solon had a production capacity for photovoltaic modules of 450 MWp (2007: 210 MWp; 2006: 130 MWp) and with a production of 176 MWp (2007: 118 MWp; 2006: 84 MWp) Solon maintained to be one of the biggest module producer in Germany and Europe. Solon employed around 943 employees at the end of 2008 and achieved a turn over of 815,1 million € and a net profit of 30,9 million € (2007: 503,1 million € und 22,2 million €; 2006: 346,4 million € und 14,4 million €).

== History ==
Solon was founded on 27 November 1996 by Saleh El-Khatib, Birgit Flore, Johannes Grosse Boymann, Paul Grunow, Stefan Krauter, Alexander Voigt, Wuseltronik GbR (Reiner Lemoine, Stefan Fütterer, Peter Fischer, Martin Sauter, Jürgen Hiller). It went public in 1998 as the first solar energy company in Germany. It was listed in the TecDAX between 20 March 2006 and 21 September 2009 and since 2007 it was an ÖkoDAX constituent. On 2 December 2008, the Solon Aktiengesellschaft (AG) became a Societas Europaea (SE).

On 1 September 2006, the Erlasee Solar Park was dedicated, with 12 MW the currently largest tracking photovoltaic solar park. It was constructed by Solon.

On 13 December 2011, Solon filed for bankruptcy.

In 2011 the leftovers were overtaken in 2012 by the Indian Microsol and in 2014 the company was moved to UAE.

== Activities in the United States ==
SOLON Corporation, a fully owned subsidiary of Solon SE for the North American market, has been producing solar panels at its plant in Tucson, Arizona since October 2007. Initially the panels were for its own project to supply electricity to Pima County and for export back to Europe.

In December 2008, the world's largest CIGS thin-film solar array went live in Tucson. SOLON Corporation produced and installed the photovoltaic modules and designed the array.

Since an agreement with American Solar Electric, in January 2009 the company started to expand to the residential market in Arizona.
