= Stefan Krauter =

German professor

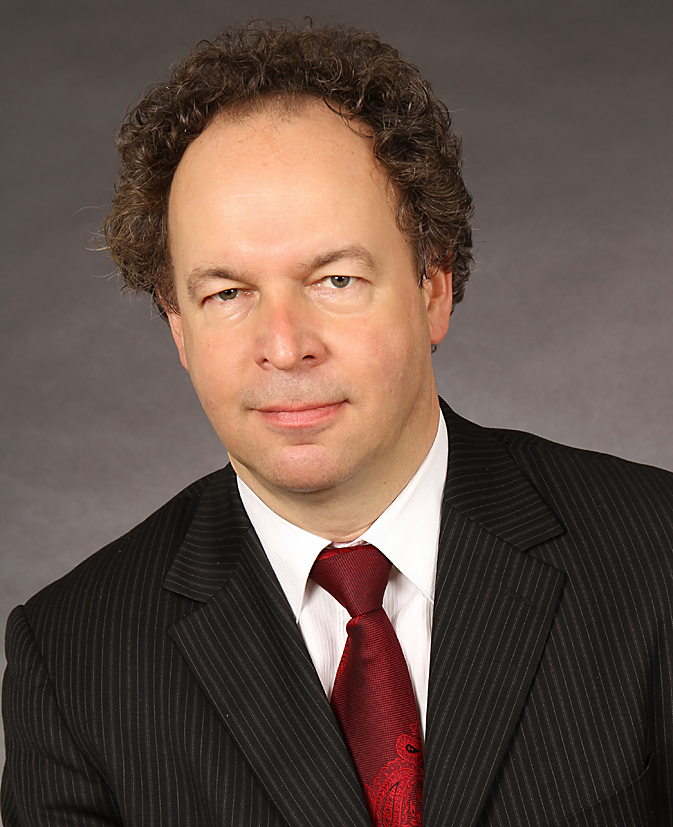
- Prof. Stefan Krauter (2015)
- Born: 1963 (age 62–63); Göppingen, West Germany
- Education: B.Sc. in Electrical Engineering, Technical University of Munich (1988); Ph.D. in Photovoltaics, Technische Universität Berlin (1993); Habilitation, Technische Universität Berlin (1998)
- Occupation: Engineer
- Employer: University of Paderborn

Stefan Krauter (born 1963 in Göppingen, West Germany) is a German engineer working in renewable energy. He specializes in photovoltaics, the direct conversion of sunlight into electricity. He is a professor at the University of Paderborn.

== Education ==
From 1982 until 1988 Krauter studied Electrical Engineering at the University of Technology Munich (TUM). During 1989 until 1994 he served as scientific assistant at Technische Universität Berlin (TUB) at the Institute for Electrical Engineering. In 1993 he completed his Ph.D. thesis about the optical, thermal and electrical operation model for photovoltaic modules at TUB under Rolf Hanitsch. In the beginning of 1994 he was a postdoc with Martin Green at the University of New South Wales (UNSW), Australia.

In 1996 he co-found Solon AG, the first cooperation for solar technology in Germany that went public (in 1997).

In 1998 he achieved habilitation from University of Technology Berlin with a thesis about the energy and CO_{2} balance of photovoltaic power stations.

== Career ==
From 1998 until 2005 he held the position of a visiting professor for Alternative Energies at the Federal University of Rio de Janeiro (UFRJ-COPPE-EE) and at the State University of Ceará (UECE) in Brazil. In 1999 he founded in Rio de Janeiro Riosolar Ltd, a company for planning, installation and operation of photovoltaic energy supply systems.

In 2002, 2003, 2005, 2006, 2009, 2012 and 2015 he chaired and organized RIO - World Climate & Energy Events (climate protection via sustainable energies) and the Latin America Renewable Energy Fair (LAREF). From 2005 to 2008 he held the position of associate professor for Photovoltaic Energy Systems at Technischen Universität Berlin. In 2006 he founded together with Paul Grunow, Sven Lehmann, and Jürgen Arp the Photovoltaic Institute Berlin AG (PI-Berlin AG). From 2008 until 2010 he was full professor for Photovoltaic Energy Systems at the University of Applied Sciences Biberach. Beginning in 2010 he is a full professor and co-director of the Institute for Sustainable Energy Concepts at the University of Paderborn.

== Selected publications ==
- S. Krauter, G. Araújo, S. Schroer, M. Salhi, R. Lemoine, C. Triebel and R. Hanitsch: Combined PV and Solar Thermal Systems for Facade Integration and Building Insulation. In: Solar Energy, Vol. 67, Issue 4–6 (1999), p. 239–248.
- S. Krauter: Increased electrical yield via water flow over the front of photovoltaic panels. In: Solar Energy Materials & Solar Cells, 82 (2004) p. 131–137.
- S. Krauter: Solar Electric Power Generation. 1. Ed., ISBN 978-3-540-31345-8, Springer: Berlin, Heidelberg, New York, 2006.
- S. Krauter, A. Froitzheim: Photovoltaik – Alles-in-einem-Band für Dummies. 1. Ed., ISBN 978-3527721801, Wiley-VCH, 576 pages, April 2026
