= Hans Fährmann =

German composer (1860–1940)

- Born: December 17, 1860; Lommatzsch, Kingdom of Saxony
- Died: June 29, 1940 (aged 79); Dresden, Germany
- Occupation(s): Romantic music composer and organist
- Years active: 1882-1940

Hans Fährmann (17 December 1860 – 29 June 1940) was a German composer of Romantic music and organist.

== Life ==
Hans Fährmann was the son of the local school teacher and cantor. At an early age, his basic musical education was taken in hand by his strict father - his piano lessons began when he was five-and-a-half. At the age of 12, he began organ lessons, and was called on regularly to play the organ as deputy at church services.

At the age of 14, in 1874, he successfully passed the entrance examination at the teacher training college in Dresden-Friedrichstadt with his interpretation of Beethoven's Piano Sonata No. 1 in F minor. He studied there until 1880. He worked as an assistant teacher in Pieschen until 1882, and as a result of his teaching skills he was exempted from one year of studies. In 1882, Fährmann devoted himself fully to music, and until 1890 he studied privately with teachers of his own choice (piano studies with Hermann Scholtz, a famous interpreter of Chopin, organ studies with the "organ king" Carl August Fischer, studies in theory and composition with Jean Louis Nicode).

Of special significance during these nine years were his visit to Franz Liszt in Weimar (in 1884 - when his interpretation of the piano sonata op.6 received the Master's blessing of his chosen career), his increasing engagement as a concert performer (notably a memorable appearance in the Dreikönig-Church in Dresden), as well as his marriage in 1889 to the Swiss Contralto Julie Bächi (they embarked on joint concert tours in the years 1889 / 90). In 1890, Fährmann began what would become his remaining life's work at the neo-Gothic Johannis-Church in Dresden (destroyed in 1945), where he remained active as cantor and organist until 1926. From 1892 he also worked as lecturer in virtuoso organ performance at the Royal Conservatory of Dresden (until 1939), was appointed royal music director in 1913, and professor in 1917.

Fährmann is buried in the Johannis-cemetery at Dresden-Tolkewitz. Most of the works of Hans Fahrmann were published by the Otto Junne publishing house, Leipzig. During the bombing of Leipzig in 1943, not only did the publisher's entire family perish, but also the printing plates of the Fährmann compositions were completely destroyed. Besides the general upheavals throughout society after 1945 and the anti-romantic atmosphere in church music, these circumstances may also have contributed to the fact that Fahrmann's oeuvre has practically vanished.

== Compositions ==
Fährmann renounces every concession which he might make for the sake of general success. With an energy bordering on recklessness he pursues his goals... Thus he is first and foremost one of the most modern, a Richard Strauss of the organ literature. His harmonies are of an intrepid audacity... With it hand in hand goes his ability for contrapuntal design, which can be considered as downright amazing... And to boot he adds salient and characteristic thematic invention...

— Otto Schmidt in the Dresdner Journal, 1905

The works of Fährmann consist of approximately 90 works. Besides numerous Lieder and choral compositions, several chamber works, two oratorios ("Heimkehr" and "Auf Bethlehems Fluren"), three concertos for organ and orchestra, he composed many pieces for organ solo, of which the 14 grand sonatas form the centre-piece.

== Work as an interpreter ==
Hans Fährmann was also a performer of great importance. In the series Evenings of European Organ Music Fährmann introduces his audience in the years 1892-1900 to almost the entire then known organ music, and included six "Bach and Mendelssohn" evenings, six "Bach, Merkel, and Rheinberger" evenings, concerts of historic music, German-French, English, Dutch-Belgian as well as pure Liszt-programmes. In contemporary reports an average of 1,500 listeners is mentioned, not infrequently the listeners must have stood in the street. Again and again, during and at the completion of each cycle, Fahrmann engaged in dialogue with the public and published reports in technical journals about his experiences and opinions, especially regarding the presentation of Bach's organ works.

== Work as a teacher ==
Fährmann's work as a teacher was enormous: 47 years as a university lecturer have left his influence on hundreds of students. The terms Father of the Saxon organists and Fährmann-School were current at the time; even at Helsingfors (Helsinki today) in Finland there are traces of Fährmann's activity and influence as a teacher.

== Fährmann as a person ==
Despite much praise for Fährmann's valuable personal traits, it must be said that he never understood how to make use of the press for himself. He belongs to those musicians whose false modesty must appear blameworthy to all, who have recognised out of which kind of wood this hard-edged artist is carved, who have come to love him, because he has given us in his works ... [of] so infinitely much beauty and profundity.

— J. Hennings in Die Harmonie, February 1912

Hans Fährmann was described by his contemporary witnesses as a serious-minded, but nevertheless humorous and hospitable person. Though he placed high demands of punctuality and diligence upon his students (as upon himself), there was hardly a weekend without his students visiting his home for coffee and cakes. Contrary to his famous contemporary Max Reger, who had founded a brilliant interpreter and sponsor in the person of Karl Straube, the organist of St Thomas's Church in Leipzig, Fährmann worked alone and modestly in his native Saxony.
