= Wilfried Gruhn =

German musicologist and music educator

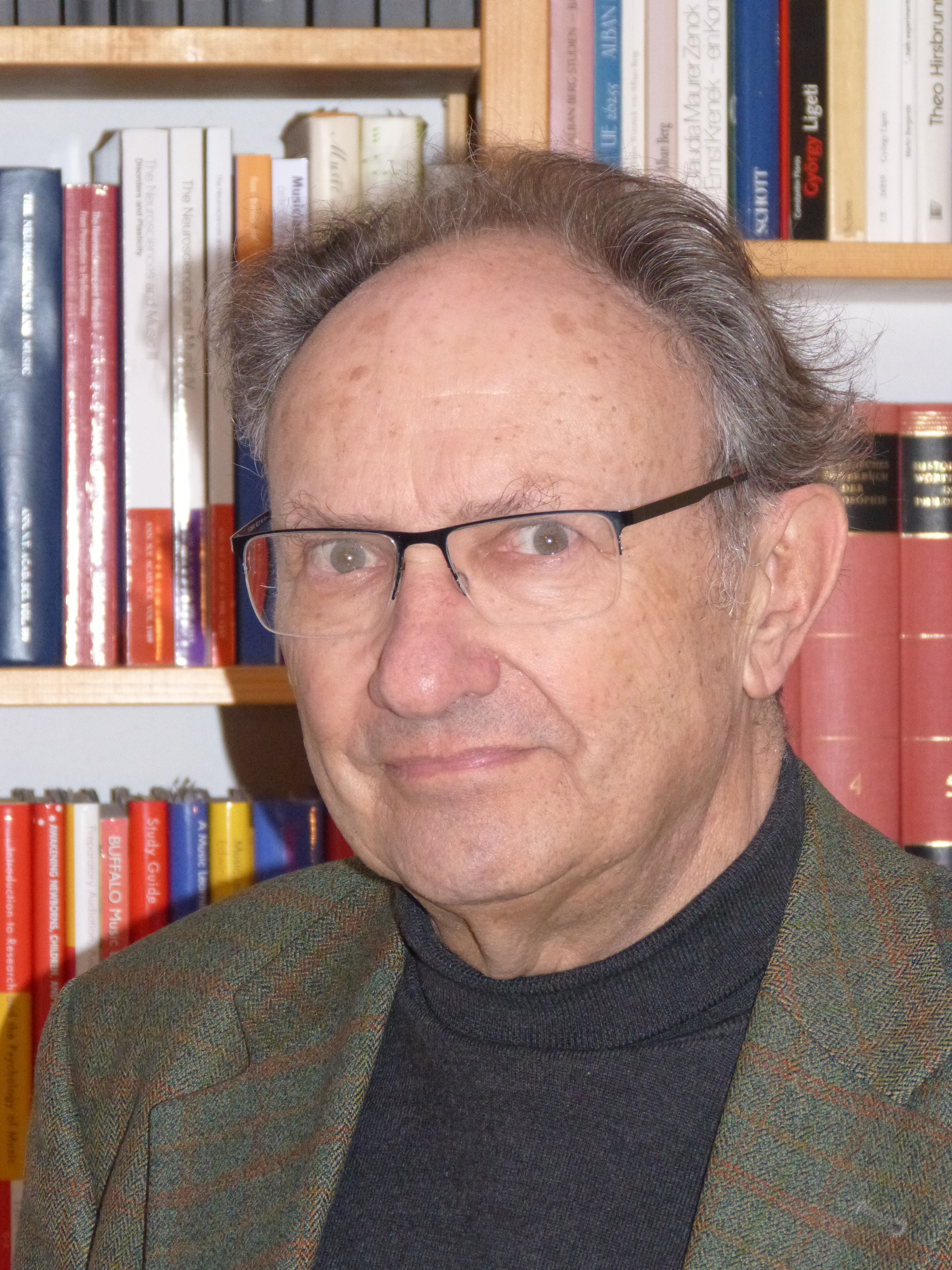
- Gruhn in 2018
- Born: 15 October 1939 (age 87); Königsberg, Germany
- Education: University of Mainz
- Occupations: Violinist; Musicologist
- Organizations: Bibliotheca Bipontina; Mainzer Flötenquartett; Heidelberger Kammerorchester; Hochschule für Musik Saar; Folkwang-Hochschule; Hochschule für Musik Freiburg; International Society for Music Education (ISME)

Wilfried Gruhn (born 15 October 1939) is a German music educator, musicologist, violinist, and professor emeritus at universities in Germany and abroad. His focus is the music education of small children. He founded and directed the Gordon Institute of early childhood music learning in Freiburg in 2003. He is engaged in several international organisations such as International Society for Music Education (ISME) and the Internationale Leo Kestenberg Gesellschaft which published Leo Kestenberg's complete writings in six volumes.

== Life ==
Born in Königsberg, Gruhn grew up in Arnsberg after his family was expelled from East Prussia in 1945. He studied school music and violin as well as musicology with Arnold Schmitz, German studies with Paul Requadt and psychology with Albert Wellek at the University of Mainz. with a thesis about the instrumentation in the orchestral works of Richard Strauss. He studied as a postgraduate in the Ludwig Bus master class in Saarbrücken. After the first state examination, he first played as a violinist in the Kammerorchester des Saarländischen Rundfunks and completed his pedagogy studies in 1966 with the second state examination for the teaching profession at higher schools. He received his doctorate in musicology in 1967 under the supervision of Hellmut Federhofer at the University of Mainz. He taught at a secondary school in Zweibrücken until 1974, where he also directed the Bibliotheca Bipontina.

After playing as a violinist in the Mainzer Flötenquartett (Mainz Flute Quartet) and the Heidelberger Kammerorchester, as well as music pedagogical engagement in curriculum commissions and in teacher training, he took over a teaching position for music pedagogy at the Hochschule für Musik Saar in 1972. In 1974, he was appointed professor at the Essen Folkwang-Hochschule, which conducted a pilot project for the development of new training courses in secondary schools I and II (Regensburg and Mainz, 1978) with the newly established course of studies in school music. In 1977, he moved to the Hochschule für Musik Freiburg as head of the course of studies in school music, where he worked until his retirement in 2003.

Gruhn held visiting professorships at the Eastman School of Music, the Universiti Teknologi MARA, the International University of Andalucía in Seville and the Estonian Academy of Music and Theatre in Tallinn, which awarded him an honorary doctorate in 2019. Further teaching assignments or courses took him to the University of the Arts Bern and the University of Music and Performing Arts Graz.

Gruhn was also president of the Research Alliance of Institutes for Music Education from 1995 to 1997. He represented Germany in the International Society for Music Education (ISME) since 1994, and was a member of its board of directors from 2000 to 2004. He was chairman of the Internationale Leo Kestenberg Gesellschaft from 2009 to 2012.

He is the author and editor of numerous specialist publications and essays as well as co-editor of music education journals Zeitschrift für Musikpädagogik (Journal for music pedagogy), Musik und Unterricht (Music and lessons) and European Music Journal.

== Scientific focus ==
Gruhn focused in his research on musical learning. Intensive contacts with American music pedagogy since 1980 led him to study the music learning theory of Edwin Gordon. The research approaches of the cognitive sciences resulted in new empirical approaches to learning research (perception and cognition of music), which also took up the expanded possibilities of the emerging neuroscience and led to research into the neural foundations of musical learning in collaboration with medical scientists, psychologists and neurologists.

With an increasing focus on early childhood music learning, he founded the Gordon-Institut für frühkindliches Musiklernen (Gordon Institute for Early Childhood Music Learning) in Freiburg in 2003, and directed it until 2009. Here, Gordon's learning-theoretical foundations were to be placed on neurobiological research results and expanded in order to make them usable for music teacher training. A parallel strand of research was devoted to historical research on the history of music education; he founded in 2009 the Internationale Leo Kestenberg Gesellschaft, which published the complete writings of Leo Kestenberg, a music education in Prussia, in six volumes, from 2009 to 2013.

== Publications ==
=== Author ===
- Musiksprache Sprachmusik Textvertonung. Aspekte des Verhältnisses von Musik, Sprache und Text. Diesterweg Frankfurt 1978, ISBN 3-425-03768-4.
- with Wilhelm Wittenbruch: Wege des Lehrens im Fach Musik. Ein Arbeitsbuch zum Erwerb eines Methodenrepertoires. Schwann, Düsseldorf 1983, ISBN 3-590-14549-8.
- Kinder brauchen Musik. Beltz, Weinheim 2003, ISBN 3-407-22867-8.
- Der Musikverstand. Olms Hildesheim 1998, 3rd revised edition 2008, 4th edition 2014, ISBN 978-3-487-15132-8.
- Geschichte der Musikerziehung. Eine Kultur- und Sozialgeschichte schulischer Musikerziehung vom Gesangunterricht der Aufklärungspädagogik zu ästhetisch kultureller Bildung. Wolke, Hofheim 1993, 4th edition 2014, ISBN 978-3-936000-11-5.
- Wahrnehmen und Verstehen. Untersuchungen zum Verstehensbegriff in der Musik. Florian Noetzel, Wilhelmshaven 1987, ISBN 3-7959-0507-9; 2nd edition 2004 (TB zur Musikwissenschaft, vol. 107).
- Anfänge des Musiklernens. Eine lerntheoretische und entwicklungspsychologische Einführung. Olms, Hildesheim 2010, ISBN 978-3-487-14475-7.
- Musikalische Gestik. Vom musikalischen Ausdruck zur Bewegungsforschung. Olms, Hildesheim 2014, ISBN 978-3-487-15122-9.
- Wir müssen lernen, in Fesseln zu tanzen. Leo Kestenbergs Leben zwischen Kunst und Kulturpolitik. Wolke, Hofheim 2015, ISBN 978-3-95593-062-2.
- "Hören als Handeln. Eine neurophysiologische Theorie der musikalischen Wahrnehmung." Olms, Hildesheim 2022

=== Editor ===
- with Heinz W. Höhnen, B. Binkowski, H. Hopf, R. Jakoby: Entwicklung neuer Ausbildungsgänge für Lehrer der Sekundarstufen I und II im Fach Musik. Modellversuch der Staatlichen Hochschule für Musik Ruhr, Folkwang Hochschule Essen, Mainz und Regensburg 1978.
- Reflexionen über Musik heute. Schott, Mainz 1981, ISBN 3-7957-2648-4.
- with Francis H. Rauscher: Neurosciences in Music Pedagogy. Nova Science Publishers Inc., New York 2007, ISBN 978-1-60021-834-7.
- with U. Mahlert, D. Schenk and J. Cohen: Leo Kestenberg: Gesammelte Schriften. complete writings in 6 volumes. Freiburg: Rombach, 2009–2013.
- with Annemarie Seither-Preisler: Der musikalische Mensch. Evolution, Biologie und Pädagogik musikalischer Begabung. Olms, Hildesheim 2014, ISBN 978-3-487-15136-6.
- with Peter Röbke: Musiklernen. Bedingungen, Handlungsfelder, Positionen. Helbling, Innsbruck/Esslingen 2018, ISBN 978-3-86227-378-2.
