= Robert Scholz =

Robert Scholz may refer to:

- Robert Scholz (actor) (1886–1927), German film actor
- Robert Scholz (pianist) (1902–1986), Austrian-born American pianist, conductor and composer
- Robert O. Scholz (1895–1978), American architect

== See also ==
- Robert Scholtz (disambiguation)
