= Ernst Ludwig von Tippelskirch =

Prussian Army officer

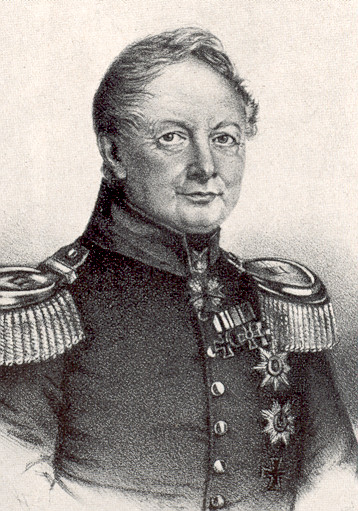
Ernst Ludwig von Tippelskirch

Lieutenant general Ernst Ludwig von Tippelskirch (26 July 1774 in Gut Görken, Prussia – 23 January 1840 in Berlin) was a Prussian Army officer during the Napoleonic Wars. Later he was commandant of Berlin and commander of the Royal Prussian State Gendarmerie.

His daughter, composer and singer Louise Tippelskirch Strantz, was born in 1823.

He served as Fortress Commander (Festungskommandant) of Petersberg Citadel in Erfurt from 1825 to 1827.
