= SV Waldhof Mannheim =

German multi-sports club best known for its football team

Waldhof Mannheim
- Full name: Sportverein Waldhof Mannheim 07 e.V.
- Nickname: Waldhof Buben (The Waldhof Boys)
- Founded: 1907; 119 years ago
- Ground: Carl-Benz-Stadion
- Capacity: 25,667
- Chairman: Bernd Beetz
- Manager: Rui Mota
- League: 3. Liga
- 2025–26: 3. Liga, 10th of 20
- Website: www.svw07.de
Home colours	Away colours

SV Waldhof Mannheim is a multi-sports club, located in Mannheim, Baden-Württemberg. It is most known for its association football team; however, there are also professional handball and table-tennis sides. The club today has a membership of over 2,400.

== History ==
The club was founded 1907 and played in the second division of the Westkreis-Liga before the First World War. Waldhof became part of the Kreisliga Odenwald in 1919 and won this league in 1920 and 1921. In each of those seasons, the club failed to advance in the Southern German championship because it was grouped with all-powerful 1. FC Nürnberg at the time. The club took a Bezirksliga Rhein championship in 1924 before joining the Bezirksliga Rhein-Saar in 1927, where it won five out of the next six division titles without ever performing particularly well in the Southern championship.

It enjoyed its best performances in the Gauliga Baden, one of sixteen top-flight divisions established through the 1933 re-organization of German football under the Third Reich. Waldhof dominated the division through the 1930s and into the early 1940s, capturing the title five times. They were unable, however, to translate that into success at the national level. Their best result came in 1940 when they went out in a semi-final against FC Schalke 04, the dominant side of the era, before settling for fourth place after losing a consolation round match to Rapid Vienna.

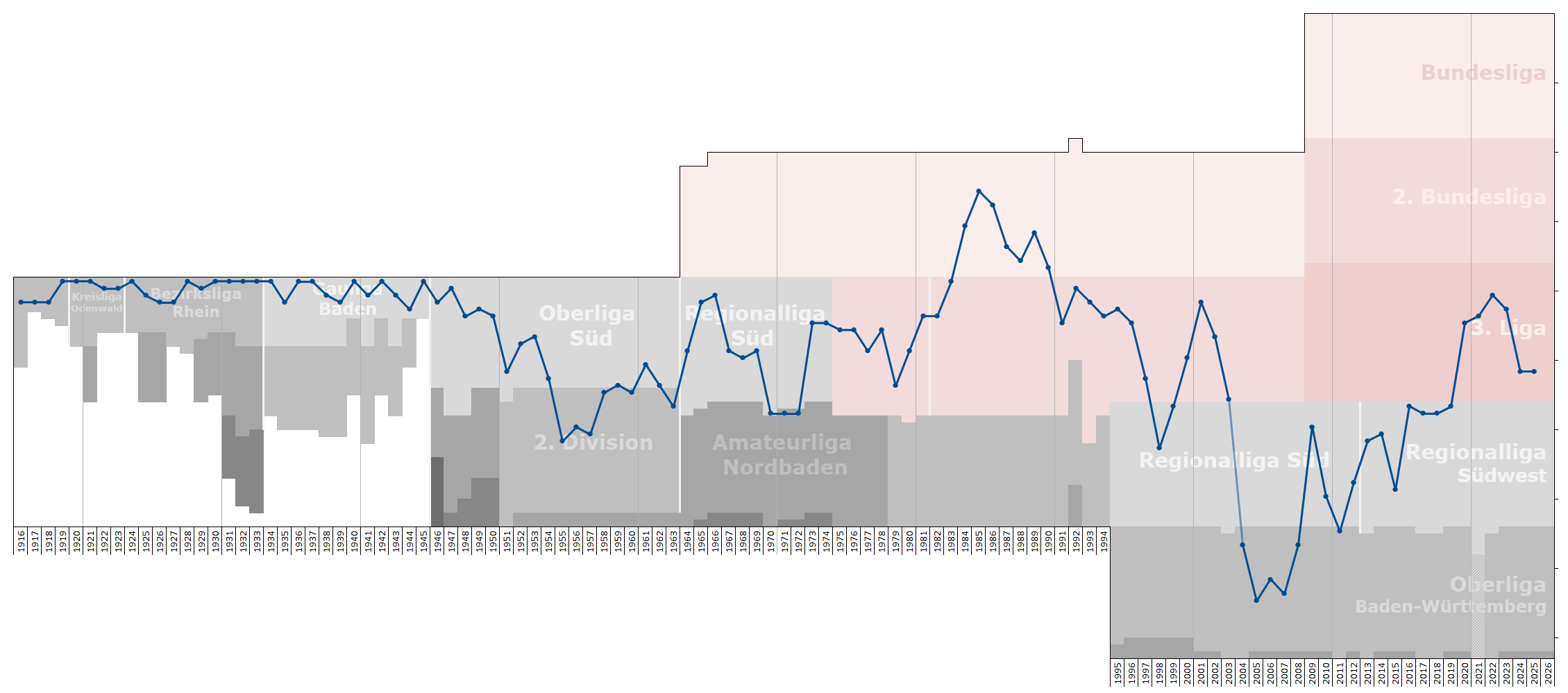
Historical chart of Waldhof Mannheim league performance

After World War II, Waldhof competed in the Oberliga Süd, where they earned mid-table results until being relegated to the 2nd Oberliga Süd in 1954. They bounced up and down between first and second division play until the formation of the Bundesliga, Germany's new professional football league, in 1963. The next season saw them in the tier II Regionalliga Süd alongside local rivals VfR Mannheim. A string of unimpressive results finally led to relegation to the Amateurliga Nordbaden (III) in 1970.

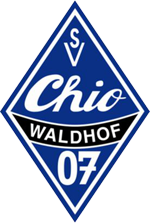
SV Chio Waldhof Mannheim c. 1972–78

Support from a new sponsor, the snack chip maker Chio, revived the team and helped their return to the second division where they played as SV Chio Waldhof Mannheim from 1972 to 1978. They continued to play as a middling side there until they broke through to the Bundesliga in 1983. Waldhof spent seven seasons in the top flight until a 17th-place finish saw the club relegated at the end of the 1989–90 season. They played for seven seasons as a 2. Bundesliga club until slipping to the Regionalliga Süd for two seasons in 1997–99. A merger with VfR Mannheim was considered in 1998 but the club walked away from a deal at the last minute. Their return to the 2. Bundesliga in 1999 after a season-long struggle with Kickers Offenbach was cut short in 2003 when financial irregularities saw the German Football Association deny the team a licence, dropping them to the Oberliga Baden-Württemberg (IV). Another attempt at a merger with VfR failed that same year. The club played in the Oberliga Baden-Württemberg until 2007–08, when a third-place finish allowed them to qualify for the Regionalliga.

After coming fourth in the Regionalliga Süd in 2008–09, the club moved to the Regionalliga West in 2009–10 to balance out the three Regionalligas.

Waldhof again had their licence withdrawn in 2010 and were demoted back to the Oberliga Baden-Württemberg, now the fifth level of German football, despite having finished clear of the relegation zone with the league's smallest budget. Waldhof spent only one year in the Oberliga, winning the league in 2010–11 and advancing directly back to the Regionalliga. On 11 June 2011 they defeated FV Illertissen 6–0 in their final league match to clinch promotion and also set a new fifth division attendance record of 18,312. It surpassed the previous record, the 2009 Leipzig derby, by more than 3,000 spectators.

At the end of the 2011–12, season the club was grouped into the new Regionalliga Südwest, which replaced the Regionalliga Süd in the region. Waldhof won the league in 2015–16 but lost to Sportfreunde Lotte in the promotion round. They also lost promotion play-offs in the following two seasons after finishing second in the Regionalliga Südwest, to Meppen on penalties in 2017 and to KFC Uerdingen in 2018 after crowd disturbances caused the second leg to be abandoned while Waldhof were losing 3–1 on aggregate. In the 2018–19 season, the team secured the Regionalliga Südwest championship and direct promotion to the 3. Liga on the 30th matchday with a 1–0 home win over Wormatia Worms.

== Players ==
=== Current squad ===
As of 3 September 2026

Note: Flags indicate national team as defined under FIFA eligibility rules; some limited exceptions apply. Players may hold more than one non-FIFA nationality.

No.	Pos.	Nation	Player
1	GK	NED	Thijmen Nijhuis (captain)
3	DF	GER	Moritz Polte
4	DF	GER	Tim Sechelmann
5	DF	GER	Yannis Hör
6	MF	GER	Joey Müller
7	MF	GER	Lovis Bierschenk
8	MF	GER	Maximilian Thalhammer
9	FW	POR	Gonçalo Gregório
10	FW	GER	Julian Ulbricht
11	FW	POR	Masca
12	MF	LUX	Vincent Thill
13	FW	USA	Terrence Boyd (captain)
14	DF	GER	Oluwaseun Ogbemudia (on loan from Union Berlin)
15	DF	SRI	Claudio Kammerknecht (captain)
16	GK	GER	Jan Niemann
17	DF	GER	Darnell Keumo (on loan from VfL Bochum)

No.	Pos.	Nation	Player
19	MF	GER	Jascha Brandt
20	MF	GER	Kushtrim Asallari
21	MF	GER	Julian Rieckmann
22	MF	KOS	Denis Kryeziu
23	FW	RWA	Leroy-Jacques Mickels
24	DF	GER	Lukas Klünter (captain)
25	DF	GER	Jid Okeke
27	MF	FRA	Adama Diakhaby
28	MF	FRA	Diego Michel
29	MF	FRA	Nolan Muteba N'Tumba
30	GK	GER	Lucien Hawryluk
33	FW	ALB	Arlind Rexhepi
35	MF	POR	Djayson Mendes
36	FW	ALB	Kian Ramadani
37	FW	GER	Noah Sarenren Bazee

== Reserve team ==
The SV Waldhof II, historically also referred to as SV Waldhof Amateure, rose to the tier-IV league Verbandsliga Nordbaden in 1986 and remained there until gaining promotion to the Oberliga Baden-Württemberg in 2001. After two seasons in the Oberliga with good results, the team had to be withdrawn due to the forced relegation of the first team. In the 2007–08 season, the team narrowly missed out on Verbandsliga promotion when it finished second on equal points to the SV Sandhausen II.

== Honours ==
The club's honours:

=== League ===
- Kreisliga Odenwald (I)
  - Champions: 1920, 1921
  - Runners-up: 1922, 1923
- Bezirksliga Rhein (I)
  - Champions: 1924
- Bezirksliga Rhein-Saar (Rhein division) (I)
  - Champions: 1928, 1930, 1931, 1932, 1933
  - Runners-up: 1929
- Gauliga Baden (I)
  - Champions: 1934, 1936, 1937, 1940, 1942
- Oberliga Süd (I)
  - Runners-up: 1947
- 2. Bundesliga (II)
  - Champions: 1983
- 2. Oberliga Süd (II)
  - Champions: 1958, 1960
- Amateurliga Nordbaden (III)
  - Champions: 1971, 1972
- Verbandsliga Nordbaden
  - Runners-up: 2000^{‡}, 2001^{‡}
- Landesliga Rhein/Neckar
  - Runners-up: 2008^{‡}, 2009^{‡}
- Regionalliga Südwest (IV)
  - Champions: 2016, 2019

=== Cup ===
- German Cup/DFB-Pokal
  - Runners-up: 1939
- Baden Cup (Tiers III–VII)
  - Winners: 1998, 1999, 2020, 2021, 2022, 2026

=== Youth ===
- German Under 19 championship
  - Champions: 1980
  - Runners-up: 1996

- ^{‡} Won by reserve team.

== Recent managers ==
Recent managers of the club:

Manager	Start	Finish
Uwe Rapolder	29 March 1997	12 November 2001
Walter Pradt	12 November 2001	3 December 2001
Andy Egli	6 December 2001	10 September 2002
Walter Pradt	11 September 2002	2 April 2003
Stefan Kuntz	3 April 2003	26 May 2003
Viktor Olscha	27 May 2003	30 June 2004
Eugen Hach	1 July 2004	3 November 2004
Maurizio Gaudino	4 November 2004	6 January 2005
Slavko Petrović	7 January 2005	22 December 2005
Massimo Morales	23 December 2005	30 June 2006
Steffen Menze	1 July 2006	20 September 2007
Alexander Conrad	21 September 2007	30 June 2009
Walter Pradt	1 July 2009	30 June 2010
Reiner Hollich	1 July 2010	2 April 2013
Andreas Clauß	3 April 2013	30 June 2013
Kenan Kocak	1 July 2013	2 July 2016
Gerd Dais	7 July 2016	16 October 2017
Michael Fink	16 October 2017	3 January 2018
Bernhard Trares	4 January 2018	4 July 2020
Patrick Glöckner	20 July 2020	30 June 2022
Christian Neidhart	1 July 2022	30 June 2023
Rüdiger Rehm	1 July 2023	31 January 2024
Marco Antwerpen	31 January 2024	17 September 2024
Bernhard Trares	18 September 2024	9 April 2025
Dominik Glawogger	10 April 2025	11 August 2025
Luc Holtz	12 August 2025	present

== Recent seasons ==
The recent season-by-season performance of the club:

=== SV Waldhof Mannheim ===
Season	Division	Tier	Position
1983–84	1. Bundesliga	I	11th
1984–85	1. Bundesliga	I	6th
1985–86	1. Bundesliga	I	8th
1986–87	1. Bundesliga	I	14th
1987–88	1. Bundesliga	I	16th
1988–89	1. Bundesliga	I	12th
1989–90	1. Bundesliga	I	18th ↓
1990–91	2. Bundesliga	II	7th
1991–92	2. Bundesliga	II	2nd (south)
1992–93	2. Bundesliga	II	4th
1993–94	2. Bundesliga	II	6th
1999–2000	2. Bundesliga	II	12th
2000–01	2. Bundesliga	II	4th
2001–02	2. Bundesliga	II	9th
2002–03	2. Bundesliga	II	18th ↓
2003–04	Oberliga Baden-Württemberg	IV	3rd
2004–05	Oberliga Baden-Württemberg	IV	11th
2005–06	Oberliga Baden-Württemberg	IV	8th
2006–07	Oberliga Baden-Württemberg	IV	10th
2007–08	Oberliga Baden-Württemberg	IV	3rd ↑
2008–09	Regionalliga Süd	IV	4th
2009–10	Regionalliga West	IV	14th ↓
2010–11	Oberliga Baden-Württemberg	V	1st ↑
2011–12	Regionalliga Süd	IV	12th
2012–13	Regionalliga Südwest	IV	6th
2013–14	Regionalliga Südwest	IV	5th
2014–15	Regionalliga Südwest	IV	13th
2015–16	Regionalliga Südwest	IV	1st
2016–17	Regionalliga Südwest	IV	2nd
2017–18	Regionalliga Südwest	IV	2nd
2018–19	Regionalliga Südwest	IV	1st ↑
2019–20	3. Liga	III	9th
2020–21	3. Liga	III	8th
2021–22	3. Liga	III	5th
2022–23	3. Liga	III	7th
2023–24	3. Liga	III	16th
2024–25	3. Liga	III	16th
2025–26	3. Liga	III	10th
2026–27	3. Liga	III	

=== SV Waldhof Mannheim II ===
Season	Division	Tier	Position
1999–2000	Verbandsliga Nordbaden	V	2nd
2000–01	Verbandsliga Nordbaden	V	2nd ↑
2001–02	Oberliga Baden-Württemberg	IV	6th
2002–03	Oberliga Baden-Württemberg	IV	10th ↓
2003–04	Verbandsliga Nordbaden	V	16th ↓
2004–05	Landesliga Rhein/Neckar	VI	9th
2005–06	Landesliga Rhein/Neckar	VI	11th
2006–07	Landesliga Rhein/Neckar	VI	8th
2007–08	Landesliga Rhein/Neckar	VI	2nd
2008–09	Landesliga Rhein/Neckar	VII	2nd ↑
2009–10	Verbandsliga Nordbaden	VI	5th
2010–11	Verbandsliga Nordbaden	VI	12th
2011–12	Verbandsliga Nordbaden	VI	7th
2012–13	Verbandsliga Nordbaden	VI	11th
2013–14	Verbandsliga Nordbaden	VI	8th
2014–15	Verbandsliga Nordbaden	VI	13th ↓
2015–16	Landesliga Rhein/Neckar	VII	7th
2016–17	Landesliga Rhein/Neckar	VII	9th
2017–18	Landesliga Rhein/Neckar	VII	3rd
2018–19	Landesliga Rhein/Neckar	VII	1st ↑
2019–20	Verbandsliga Nordbaden	VI	12th
2020–21	Verbandsliga Nordbaden	VI	6th
2021–22	Verbandsliga Nordbaden	VI	6th
2022–23	Verbandsliga Nordbaden	VI	6th
2023–24	Verbandsliga Nordbaden	VI	8th
2024–25	Verbandsliga Nordbaden	VI	9th

- With the introduction of the Regionalligas in 1994 and the 3. Liga in 2008 as the new third tier, below the 2. Bundesliga, all leagues below dropped one tier.

=== Key ===
↑ Promoted	↓ Relegated

== Rivals ==
Waldhof have a fierce rivalry with 1. FC Kaiserslautern. However, due to the league gap between the two sides, the rivalry was rarely competed until the 2019–20 season, where the two sides met for the first time in 22 years in the 3. Liga, the third tier of German football. Past meetings between the two have resulted in violence between the two sets of supporters, as well as between supporters and police. Another incident before a derby saw weapons seized by police.

Waldhof also share smaller rivalries with Kickers Offenbach and Mannheim city-rivals VfR Mannheim.

== Stadium ==
SV Waldhof plays its home games at the Carl-Benz-Stadion, which holds 27,000 and opened in 1994.
