= Hermann Scholtz =

German pianist and composer

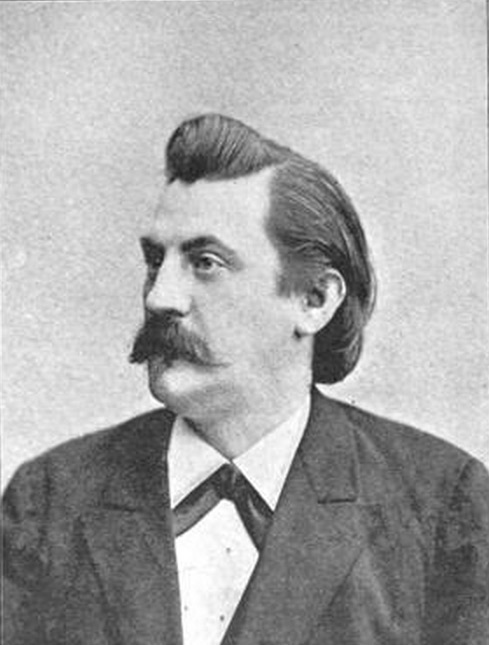
Hermann Scholtz (ca. 1895)

Hermann Scholtz (9 June 1845 – 13 July 1918) was a German pianist and composer.

== Life ==
Born in Breslau, Scholtz first studied with Moritz Brosig in Breslau (harmony) and in 1865 went to the Leipzig conservatory, where he continued his studies with Louis Plaidy (piano), Carl Riedel (counterpoint) and Heinrich Schulz-Beuthen (instrumentation). On the recommendation of Franz Liszt, he moved to Munich in 1867 and completed his studies at the University of Music and Performing Arts Munich there with Hans von Bülow (piano) and Josef Gabriel Rheinberger (counterpoint).

He then taught at the Munich Musikhochschule for six years, moving to Dresden in 1875, where he was appointed Royal Saxon Chamber Virtuoso in 1880 and Professor in 1910. His pupils included Hans Fährmann, Leo Kestenberg, Clara Mannes and Johannes Pache.

Scholtz was on friendly terms with Marie Wieck, who temporarily left her summer house in Hosterwitz to his family. He last lived at Nürnberger Straße 18b.

As a pianist, Scholtz stood out above all with works by Frederic Chopin. For the Edition Peters he published his works in an edited three-volume edition, which was a standard edition for a long time.

There are several interpretations by Scholtz on punched tape for the phonola piano of the Ludwig Hupfeld AG erhalten, darunter von seiner Ballade op. 76, außerdem von Chopins Piano Concerto No. 2 in F minor op. 21 (larghetto).

Scholtz died in Dresden at the age of 73.

== Family ==
Scholtz was married to Flora née Nádler, a sister of the Budapest art professor Róbert Nádler. Their son Robert Friedrich Karl Scholtz (14 April 1877 in Dresden - 19 May 1956 in Berlin) was a painter and graphic artist.

== Works ==
- Klavierkonzert e-Moll
- Albumblätter op. 20
- Acht Mädchenlieder op. 37
- Klaviertrio f-Moll op. 51
- Ballade op. 76
- Variationen über ein Originalthema für 2 Klaviere op. 77
