= Theodor Kullak =

German musician (1818–1882)

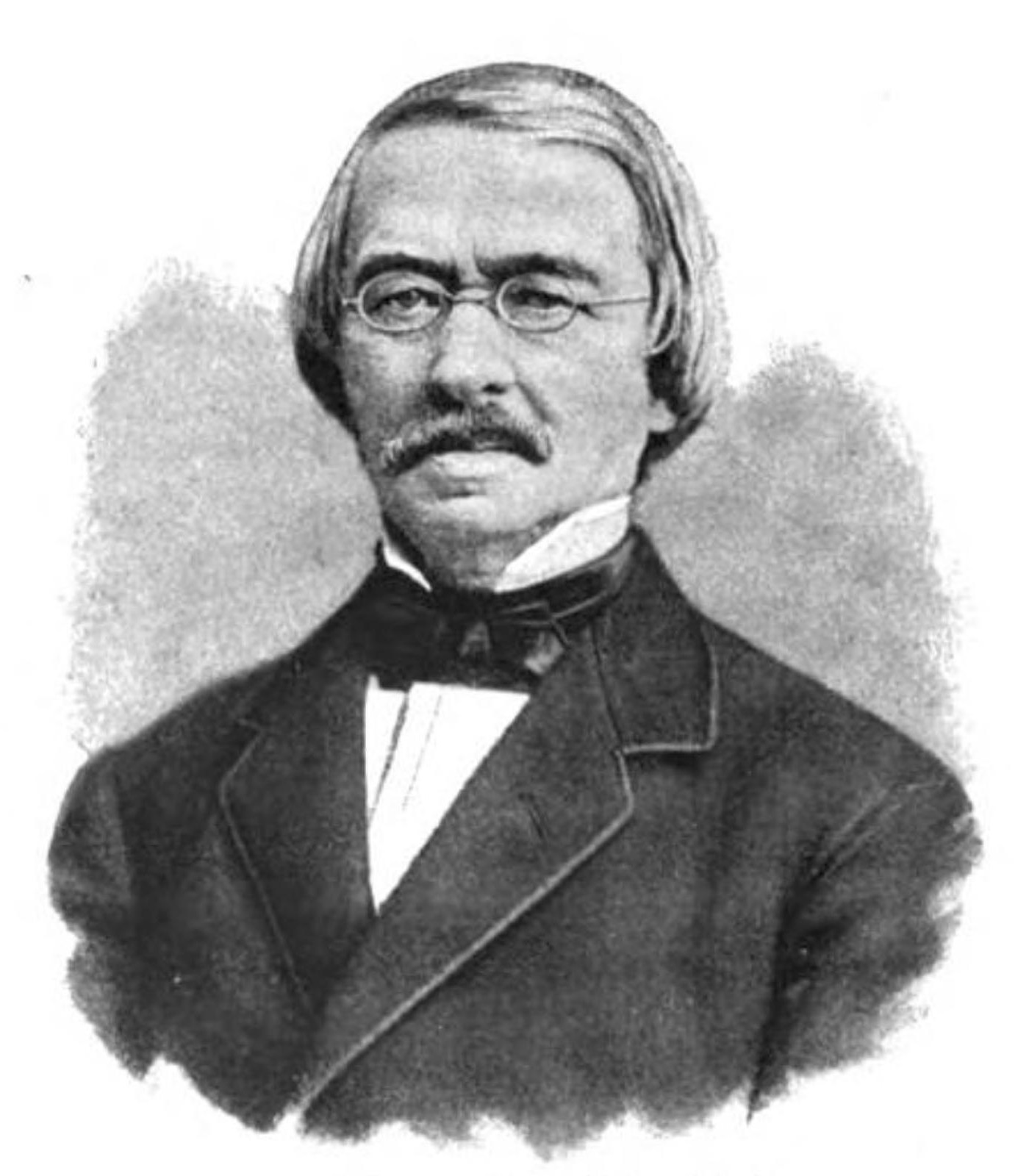

Theodor Kullak (12 September 1818 – 1 March 1882) was a German pianist, composer and teacher.

== Background ==
Kullak was born on 12 September 1818, in Krotoszyn. He began his piano studies as a pupil of Albrecht Agthe in Poznań. He progressed sufficiently to excite the interest of the artistic Prince Anton Radziwill in his eighth year. This early ability to attract noble patronage was an art he continued to deploy to advantage for many years to come. In 1829, the prince used his influence to secure a Berlin court concert. He appeared with soprano singer Henriette Sontag. The usually undemonstrative King Frederick William IV was so delighted that he presented young Kullak with thirty Friedrichs d'or. He performed a concert in Breslau that was received with gratifying applause. The kindly Prince Radziwill then saw to a rounded education for Kullak, sponsoring his school fees in Sulechów (now in Poland).

Kullak eventually lost Radziwill's patronage and from age thirteen to eighteen, had to make do with just occasional access to a piano. At age nineteen, at his father's behest, he opted for a sensible profession and went to study medicine in Berlin. A new aristocratic friend, Count von Ingenheim, provided a small stipend which allowed him music studies with Siegfried Dehn and Wilhelm Taubert. Ingenheim was also instrumental in providing him with several pupils of rank. Medicine was not close to Kullak's heart. Music was a more pressing vocation and in 1842 Hermine von Massow interceded on his behalf in the right places, and Frederick William IV placed 400 thaler at Kullak's disposal, specifically for piano studies.

== Musical career ==
Kullak moved to Vienna for his education. Carl Czerny happily took over his pianistic schooling, and Otto Nicolai and Simon Sechter, the theoretical side of things. Franz Liszt and Adolf von Henselt were also highly revered influences. Kullak played a little in Austria that year but in 1843 returned to Berlin where Fraulein von Hellwig secured him the post of pianoforte instructor to Princess Anna, the daughter of Prince Karl. This was just the beginning. Kullak seemed subsequently to make a speciality of teaching princes and princesses of the Royal house, as well as the offspring of many upper-class families who became aware of his excellent professorial qualifications, connections and, presumably, his unimpeachable manners.

In 1844, Kullak founded the Tonkünstler-Verein in Berlin and presided over it for many years. Two years later, at the age of twenty-eight, he was made Pianist to the Prussian Court, and four years after that founded the Berliner Musikschule (also known as the Kullak Institute) in partnership with Julius Stern and Adolf Bernhard Marx. However, due to dissension in the ensuing five years, Kullak retired from his institute, which then became known as the Stern Conservatory, with Hans von Bülow as a director.

In 1855, Kullak established a new school, the Neue Akademie der Tonkunst, which proved a lasting success and was affectionately referred to as "Kullak's Academy". It specialised in the training of pianists and became the largest private music school in the whole of Germany. By the time of its twenty-fifth anniversary it boasted a hundred teachers and eleven hundred students. Kullak was made professor in 1861 and was also elected to honorary membership of the Royal Academy of Music in Florence. Many other distinctions were also accorded him.

His son Franz received his musical education at his father's Akademie; he and completed his studies under Karl Wehle and Henry Litolff in Paris, but abandoned a concert career because of a nervous complaint, and instead taught at the Neue Akademie where he succeeded his father as director upon his father's death in 1882.

Kullak wrote a large amount of instructional piano music. His Die Schule des Oktavenspiels (The School of Octave Playing), published in 1848 and edited in 1877, is especially well known. His other music, including a piano concerto in C minor, and two sonatas, is very rarely played today.

Theodor Kullak edited and annotated a 13-book edition of the piano works of Frédéric Chopin that was published by Schlesinger and co-issued by G. Schirmer, Inc. and others in the 1880s. He also edited the complete piano works of Felix Mendelssohn, including Songs Without Words, published by C. F. Peters.

Among Kullak's many pupils were August Arnold, Alfred Grünfeld, Agathe Backer Grøndahl, Heinrich Hofmann, Alexander Ilyinsky, Leonard Liebling, Moritz Moszkowski, Silas Gamaliel Pratt, Julius Reubke, Nikolai Rubinstein, Xaver Scharwenka, Otto Bendix, Hans Bischoff, Amy Fay, James Kwast, Kathinka Paulsen White, and Fred Werner. Noted Bohemian pianist and composer Franz Bendel taught at the academy.

== Compositions ==
=== Piano ===
- Two Etudes de Concert, Op. 2
- Grand Valse brillante, Op. 3
- Le Reve, Pièce de Salon, Op. 4
- Danse des Sylphides, Op. 5
- 12 Transcriptions, Op. 6
- Grand Sonata in F♯ minor, Op. 7
- 12 Transcriptions ou Paraphase, Op. 9
- Fantaisie de Concert sur Freischütz, Op. 11
- Grande Fantaisie sur '‘La Fille du Régiment'’, Op. 13
- Grande Fantaisie sur ‘'Preciosa’', Op. 14
- Grande Fantaisie sur '‘Jessonda’', Op. 15
- Grande Fantaisie sur La Fille du Régiment de Donizetti, Op. 16
- Die Kunst des Anschlags, Fingerübungen, Op. 17
- Fantaisie de Caprice, Op. 19
- Portfeuille de Musique #1, Op. 20
- La Gazelle, Op. 22
- Une Fleur de Pologne, Polonaise brilliant, Op. 24
- 6 Solis de Piano, Op. 25
- Symphonie-Sonate in E♭ major, Op. 27
- Le Danaides, Fantaisie, Op. 28
- Nord et Sud, 2 Nocturnes, Op. 29
- Grande Fantaisie sur '‘L'Etoile du Nord’', Op. 30
- Paraphrase du 4me acte de ‘'Dom Sébastian’', Op. 31
- 3 Mazurkas, Op. 34
- Notturno, Op. 35
- Chant d'Ossian, Op. 36
- Perles d'écume, Fantaisie, Op. 37
- Libella, Thème et Etude, Op. 38
- Rayons et Ombres, 6 Pieces, Op. 39
- Caprice-Fantaisie sur ‘L'Etoile du Nord’, Op. 40
- 2 Paraphrases sur Verdi's Ernani, Op. 43
- La belle Amazone, Rondeau à la Polacca, Op. 44
- Pieces, Op. 45
- Fleurs du Sud, 6 Pieces, Op. 46
- School of Octave playing, Op. 48
- Saltarello di Roma, Op. 49
- Rotkäppchen, Op. 50
- Portfeuille de Musique #2, Op. 51
- Impromptu, Op. 52
- Etincelles, Thème et Etude, Op. 53
- Ballade, Op. 54
- Bouquet de 12 Mélodies russes, Op. 56
- Les Fleurs animées, Op. 57
- Romance variée, Op. 58
- Allegro di Bravoura, Op. 59
- Le Prophète, 7 Transcriptions de Concert, Op. 60
- Schule der Fingerübungen, Op. 61
- Scenes of Childhood, Op. 62
- Galop de Salon, Op. 63
- Valse de Salon, Op. 64
- Romance de Dargomijski, Op. 65
- Romance de Glinka, Op. 66
- Improvisation sur ‘'La Fée aux Roses'’, Op. 67
- 2 Mélodies hongroises, Op. 68
- 2 Pieces, Op. 71
- Airs nationaux bohémiens, Op. 72
- Ratschläge und Studien, Op. 74
- 5 Idylles, Op. 75
- Shéhérazade, Op. 78
- Lieder aus alter Zeit, Op. 80/1
- Improvisation dramatique sur '‘L'Etoile du Nord’', Op. 80/2
- Leonore, Ballade, Op. 81/1
- Scenes of Childhood, Op. 81/2
- Paraphrase du Siège de Corinthe, Op. 82
- Petrarca an Laura, 3 Pieces, Op. 84
- Hymne, Op. 85
- Bolero di Bravoura, Op. 86
- Valse de Salon, Op. 87
- Psyché, Etude fantastique, Op. 88
- In Wald und Flur, Pieces, Op. 89/1
- Les Arpèges, Etude de Concert, Op. 89/2
- Im Mai, Impromptu, Op. 90
- Au Clair de la Lune, 2 Nocturnes, Op. 91
- 2 Chansonnettes, Op. 92
- Violen, Pieces, Op. 93
- Zwiegespräch, Op. 94
- St. Gilgen, Barcarolle-Prière, Op. 95
- Scherzo, Op. 96
- Impromptu-Caprice, Op. 97
- Airs nationaux italiens, Op. 98
- 2 Valse-Caprices, Op. 99
- Sang und Klang, 4 Pieces, Op. 100
- 2 Polonaises caractéristiques, Op. 101
- Romance in G major, Op. 102
- Hommage à S.A.R. la Princesse royale de Prusse, 3 Pieces, Op. 103
- 4 Solostücke, Op. 104
- Im Grünen, Pieces, Op. 105
- Gracieuse, Impromptu, Op. 106
- Airs nationaux russes, Op. 108
- Polonaise et Valse-Impromptu, Op. 109
- Mazurka-Caprice, Op. 110
- Lieder aus alter Zeit, Op. 111
- Ondine, Op. 112
- 6 Pieces, Op. 113
- Valse-Caprice, Op. 115
- Bolero, Op. 116
- Marche de Couronnement de Meyerbeer, Op. 117
- Valse mignonne, Op. 118
- Soldatenlieder, Op. 119
- Arcadien, Pieces, Op. 120
- Konzert-Etüde für die Klavierschule von Lebert und Stark, Op. 121
- Concert Etude, Op. 122
- Barcarole, Op. 123
- Fantasiestück, Op. 124
- Scherzo in G major, Op. 125
- Mazurka de Concert, Op. 126
- Cavatine de Robert le Diable de Meyerbeer
- Scherzo
- Romanze by Warlamoff (transcription of Varlamov)

=== Orchestral ===
- Piano Concerto in C Minor, Op. 55 (Piano and Orchestra) (composed around 1850)

=== Chamber music ===
- Andante for Violin and Piano, Op. 70
- Piano Trio in E, Op. 77

=== Lieder ===
- 4 songs, Op. 1

== Discography ==
- Kullak, Theodor: Klavierkonzert c-moll op. 55, Hyperion Records 1999 (series: 'The Romantic Piano Concerto' Vol. 21. Piano: Piers Lane. Glasgow BBC Scottish Symphony Orchestra)
