= Silas G. Pratt =

American opera composer

Silas Gamaliel Pratt
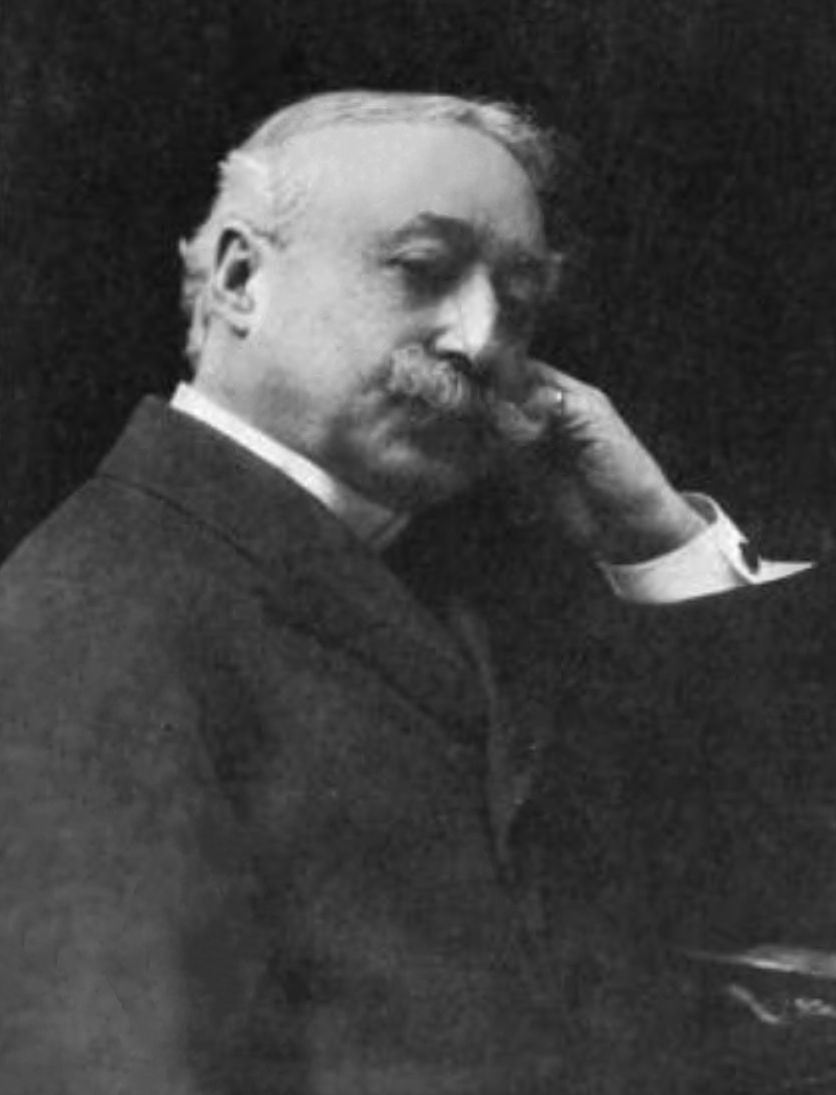
- Born: August 4, 1846; Addison, Vermont
- Died: October 30, 1916 (aged 70); Pittsburgh
- Resting place: Chicago

Silas Gamaliel Pratt (August 4, 1846 – October 30, 1916) was an American composer, who often published under the pseudonym V. B. Aubert. One critic described Pratt as "an example of the irrepressible Yankee in music".

== Life and career ==
He was born in Addison, Vermont. As a child he moved to Plainfield, Illinois, and as a young man he worked in Chicago for music dealers H. M. Higgins and Lyon & Healy, and gained enough proficiency on the piano to give public recitals. In Chicago he studied under Louis Staab and Paul Beeker.

In 1868 he travelled to Germany to further his studies. He studied with Theodor Kullak, Franz Bendel, Richard Wüerst, Friedrich Kiel, and Heinrich Dorn. During this time he suffered a wrist injury, which prevented his becoming a professional concert pianist. His first symphony was written and performed in Berlin in 1871.

Upon his return to the United States in 1871, he settled again in Chicago, immersing himself in the musical life there. He founded (and promptly quit) Chicago's Apollo Club in 1872 with George B. Upton, and became organist of the Church of the Messiah. He was the head piano instructor for Northwestern University's Conservatory of Music in 1874, and taught piano in Joliet. He produced the Chicago Grand Opera Festival

He returned to Germany between 1875 and 1877, where he called upon Liszt at Weimar, and was U.S. vice consul to Germany in the winter of 1876. During this trip, his Centennial Anniversary Overture, dedicated to Ulysses Grant, was performed twice in Berlin, and once in London during Grant's stop there on his world tour.

He made other trips to Europe, to England in 1885, and Antwerp in 1895 for the Antwerp International Exposition.

In 1888 Pratt moved to New York. He helped organize the American Day and Chicago Day programs at the World's Columbian Exposition, composing the inaugural fanfare for the latter. In the lead-up to the exposition, he had attempted to secure significant funding from the exposition on behalf of the nascent MTNA to produce concerts of American music. In 1895, he was appointed principal of the West End School of Music in New York, and was one of the founders of the Manuscript Society in New York.

He later moved to Pittsburgh, and established the Pratt Institute of Music and Art in 1906; he served as the Institute's president until his death in 1916. He was buried in Chicago.

== Compositions and works ==
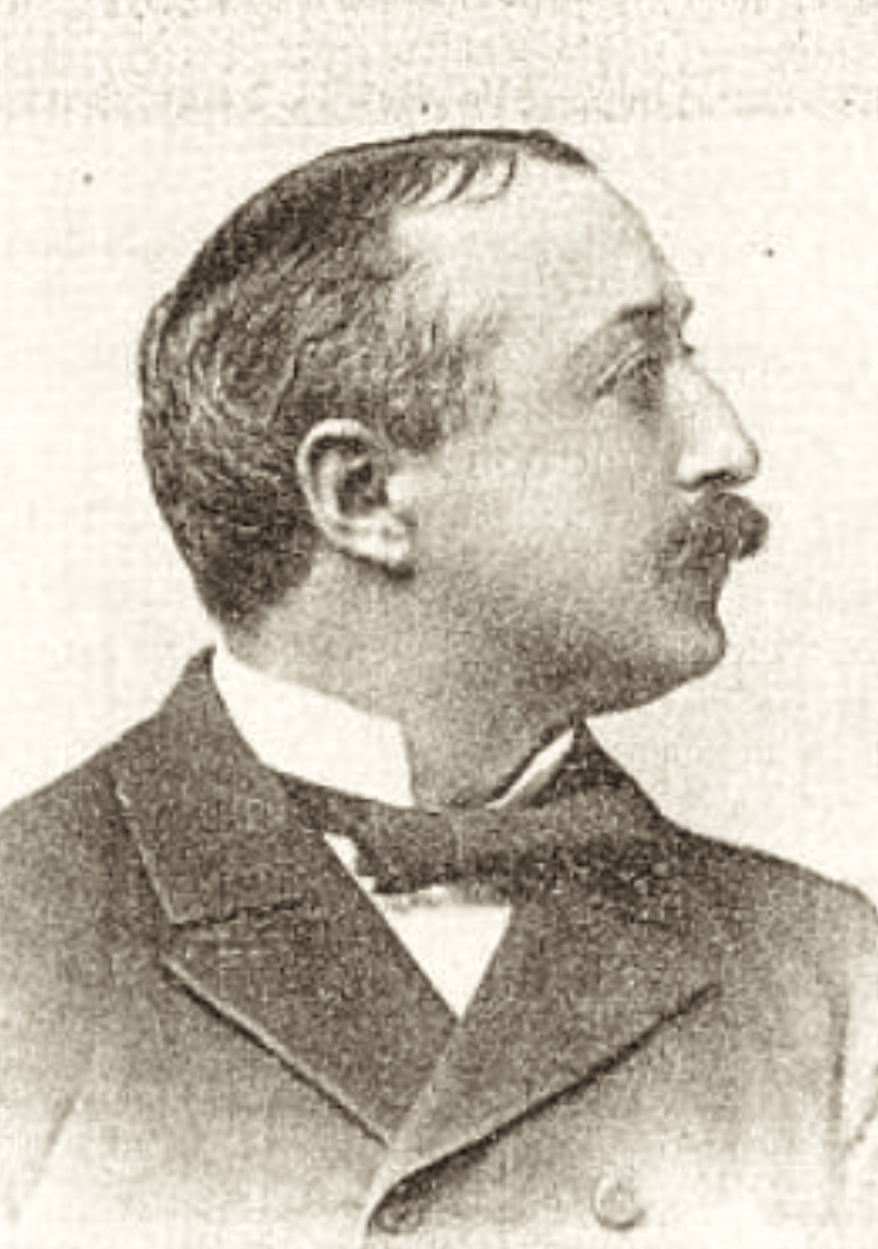
Silas G. Pratt in 1890.

Pratt composed a great number of piano miniatures; these were usually published under the pseudonym V. B. Aubert. In these pieces he gravitated towards dance forms: waltzes, mazurkas, and schottisches.

Pratt is known to have completed at least three operas, one of which he later revised; only two were ever performed. Zenobia was performed seven times at Chicago's McVicker's Theater; selections from Zenobia were played at the 1885 MTNA convention and at Crystal Palace during his 1885 visit to England. The advance publicity for Zenobia labelled Pratt the "American Wagner". Pratt sent a copy of the score and some of the publicity to Liszt in Weimar; Liszt's private reaction was not favorable. According to Liszt student Carl Lachmund, about the opera Liszt commented "Crazy stuff! He has gone so far that he cannot learn anything.", and about the American Wagner allusion, he said "Why not say 'Wagner, the German Pratt'?"

He also produced many patriotic works, and was a shrewd self-promoter of them. He was the first composer to set "America the Beautiful". His musical allegory, The Triumph of Columbus, was composed for the quadricentennial of Columbus's discovery of the New World, and was performed at Carnegie Hall on 10 October 1892. He wrote a symphony inspired by Lincoln, including a book of Lincoln anecdates. His Centennial Anniversary Overture was dedicated to and performed for Grant, and fittingly he composed the Allegory of the War in Song for the Grant Monument Association. In 1891 he conducted a series of concerts called The War in Song, a Musical Allegory of the Late Civil War. Among his other compositions was a symphony about the sinking of the Titanic completed in June 1913.

Writings by Pratt include a book entitled Lincoln in story: the life of the martyr-president told in authenticated anecdotes, published by Appleton in 1901. He also wrote some piano pedagogical texts, including The pianist's mental velocity: a new departure in piano study in 1905.

== Compositions ==
- Antonio (lyric opera, selections performed, written 1870–71)
- Zenobia, Queen of Palmyra (1882), opera
- Lucille (revision of Antonio) (1887), opera
- Ollanta (unperformed opera)
- The Triumph of Columbus, a semi-staged cantata or pageant.
- Allegory of the War in Song, produced for the Grant Monument Association
- America the Beautiful
- The Angel's Call, valse celeste
- Angel's Wings, Romance for piano
- The Battle Fantasia
- The Battle of Manila Bay
- Black Crook Waltz, possibly composed specially for Baker's production of The Black Crook
- Centennial Anniversary Overture, dedicated to Ulysses Grant.
- The Crown of Glory
- Life's Dream is o'er!
- Charm Bells Nocturne
- Cupid's Whisper Mazurka
- Gone! Impromptu
- Griffith Gaunt schottische
- Heart's Hope
- The Last Dream
- La Perle de Nuit
- Lincoln Symphony
- Love's First Dream
- Love's Last Dream
- Love's Messenger Polka
- Magdalen's Lament
- The Matinée polka
- The Midnight Stars
- The Midnight Zephyrs
- Moonlight Shadows
- Murmuring Wavelets
- Musical Thoughts for the Piano
- Néné waltz
- A Night of Love
- Ola, fantasie romanesque
- Paul Revere's Ride
- Pensée Celeste
- Prodigal Son, symphony
- Rêve d'Artist
- The Revolution
- Shakesperian Grand March
- The Harp At Midnight
- The Serenade March
- The Sigh
- The Smile: Polka gracieuse
- The Tempest, his 3rd symphony
- Triumph of Columbus
- Undine polka brillante
- Undine valse brillante
- White Fawn March
- White Fawn Schottische
- a string quartet
