= Hans Bischoff (pianist) =

German pianist (1852–1889)

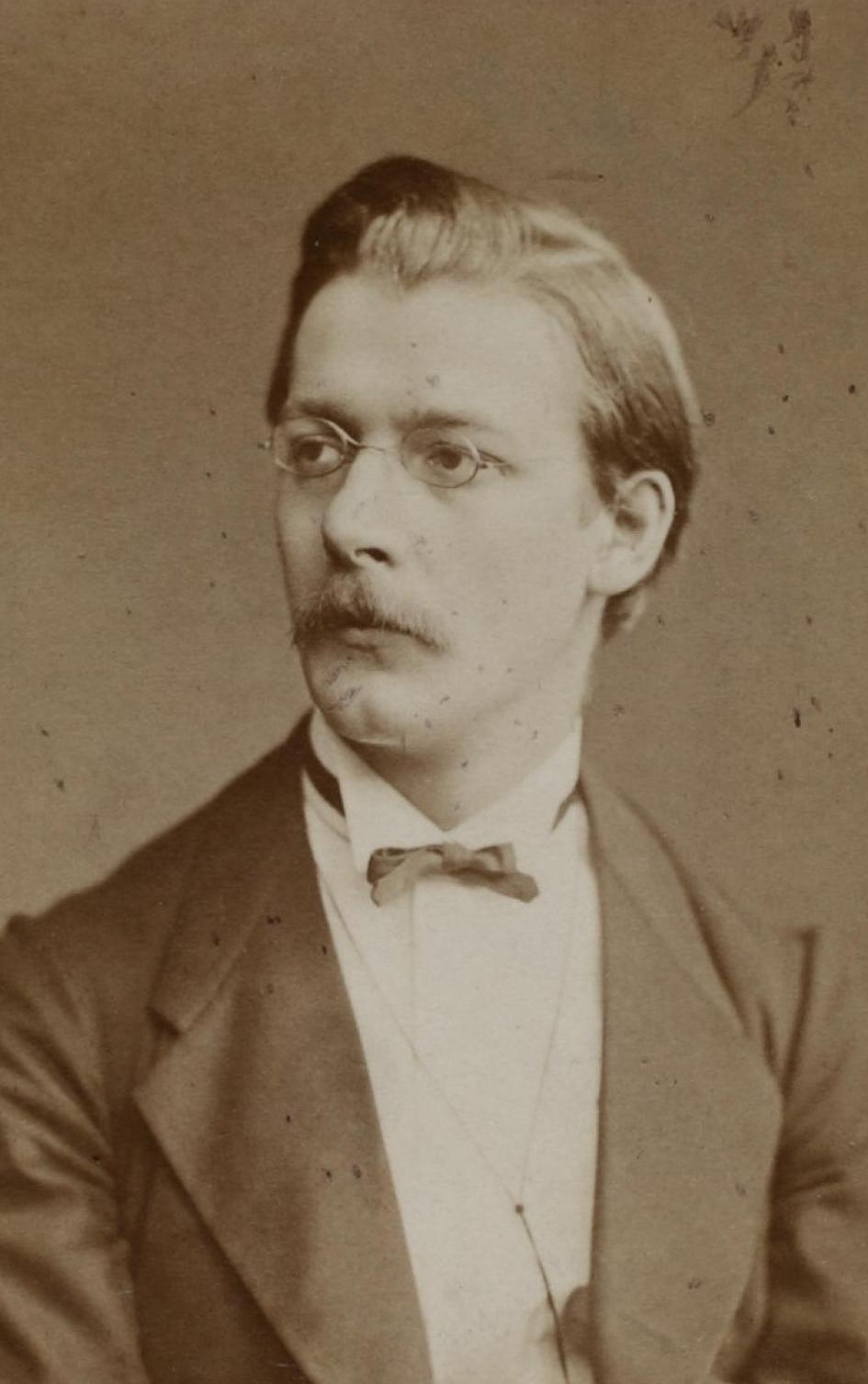
- Born: February 17, 1852; Berlin
- Died: June 12, 1889 (aged 37); Niederschönhausen
- Known for: Piano

Hans Bischoff (17 February 1852 in Berlin – 12 June 1889 in Niederschönhausen) was a German pianist most noted for his edition of Johann Sebastian Bach's keyboard works. He studied with Theodor Kullak in Berlin. He taught piano and theory at Kullak's Neue Akademie der Tonkunst. He also taught at the Stern Conservatory and was active as a concert pianist.

In addition to editing Bach's works, Bischoff edited and revised his late teacher's book on piano playing. The book went through multiple German editions and was also published in English translation in the United States.
