= Fred Werner =

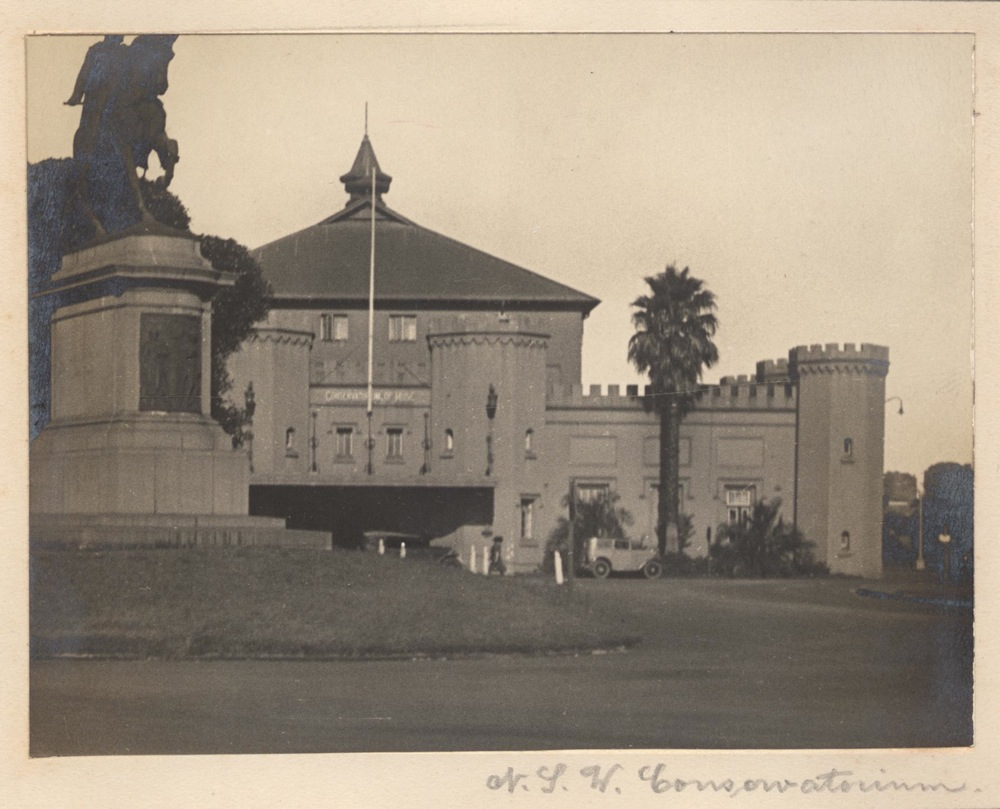
- Fred Werner taught at Sydney Conservatory of Music

Background information
- Born: c. 1850; Melbourne, Victoria, Australia
- Died: c. 1920
- Genres: romantic, classical
- Occupations: Composer, Teacher, publican
- Instrument: piano
- Years active: 1890-1914

Tarantelle (1909)
MIDI version

Gavotte (1909)
MIDI version

Fred Werner born Gottfried W Werner was an Australian composer, music teacher. He was possibly born near Berlin where he attended the prestigious Stern Conservatory and studied under Polish composer Theodor Kullak. He migrated to Coolabah near Dubbo in New South Wales, Australia around 1890. In 1902 he married Emma Durrell and had a son Charles. In 1910 he was appointed to the Staff of Sydney Conservatorium of Music where he taught keyboard and held several recitals. In 1915 he left teaching, possibly due to wartime Australian racism, and in 1916 he became licensee at the Coolabah Hotel His best known student was Kate Rooney who succeeded in tours of London and USA

== Works ==
- Six pieces for piano [for student instruction]
- Stray leaves (including 'Bacarolle' and 'minuet' intended for ballet students)
- Octave studies for convent schools
- Romance
- Desiderata
- Ǽnone Waltz
- Berceuse
- Aubade
- Three songs
