= Lommatzsch =

Lommatzsch Hłomač (Upper Sorbian)
- Town
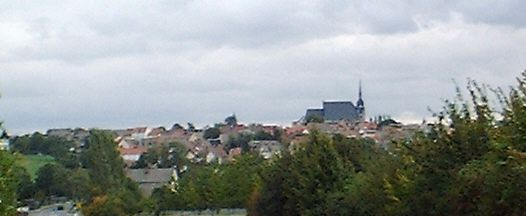
- View from the north

- Flag Coat of arms

- Location of Lommatzsch within Meißen district
- Interactive map of Lommatzsch
- Location within Germany Location within Saxony
- Coordinates: 51°12′N 13°18′E
- Country: Germany
- State: Saxony
- District: Meißen

Government
  - Mayor (2019–26): Anita Maaß (FDP)

Area
  - Total: 66.63 km^{2} (25.73 sq mi)
- Elevation: 168 m (551 ft)

Population (2025-12-31)
  - Total: 4,672
  - Density: 70.12/km^{2} (181.6/sq mi)
- Time zone: UTC+01:00 (CET)
  - Summer (DST): UTC+02:00 (CEST)
- Postal codes: 01621–01623
- Dialling codes: 035241
- Vehicle registration: MEI, GRH, RG, RIE
- Website: www.lommatzsch.de

Lommatzsch (German pronunciation: [ˈlɔmat(s)ʃ]; Upper Sorbian: Hłomač, pronounced [ˈhwɔmatʃ]) is a municipality located in the district of Meißen in the Free State of Saxony, Germany.

== Geography ==
Lommatzsch lies amidst the so-called Lommatzscher Pflege, an area of land featuring high quality loessic soil and therefore mainly used agriculturally.

=== Subdivisions ===
Albertitz, Altlommatzsch, Altsattel, Arntitz, Barmenitz, Birmenitz, Churschütz, Daubnitz, Dennschütz, Dörschnitz, Grauswitz, Ickowitz, Jessen, Klappendorf, Krepta, Lautzschen, Löbschütz, Lommatzsch, Marschütz, Mögen, Neckanitz, Paltzschen, Petzschwitz, Piskowitz, Pitschütz, Poititz, Prositz, Rauba, Roitzsch, Scheerau, Schwochau, Sieglitz, Striegnitz, Trogen, Wachtnitz, Weitzschenhain, Wuhnitz, Zöthain, Zscheilitz.

== History ==
The town's name is derived from the West Slavic Glomacze tribe (Daleminzier in German), who settled here around 800 C.E. at the Glomuci sanctuary, a now dry lake north of the town. Lommatzsch in the Margraviate of Meissen was first mentioned as Lomats in a 1286 deed. Other previous variations of the name recorded include:

- 1190 Thiemo de Lomacz
- 1206 Heinricus sacerdos de Lomaz
- 1286 Lomats
- 1308 Lomatsch
- 1350 Lamacz, Lowmacz
- 1408 Lommaczsch
- 1500 Lumbatzsch
- 1518 Lumbicz
- 1547 Lommatz, Lommitsch, Lummitsch

On 12 August 1330, the Wettin margrave Frederick I ceded to the Meissen burgrave the tax receipts from the Lommatzsch citizens for having the right to brew beer. A mayor and a board was mentioned in 1386, the council's constitution of 1412 ordered a mayor and 9 board members. In 1423 Lommatzsch with the Meissen margraviate was merged into the Electorate of Saxony under Wettin rule.

The current Saint Wenceslaus parish church was erected from 1504 onwards, three Gothic spikes were set on the tower of a predecessor building and a nave was added. The town became Protestant in 1539, when Ambrosius Naumann became the first Evangelical pastor. The town hall in its current size was erected from 1550 to 1555, and the Saint Wenceslaus Church received its first tower clock in 1591. In 1607 and 1611 the town was heavily affected by plague epidemics, leaving 1,350 dead, soon followed by the destructive Thirty Years' War: after Elector John George I of Saxony had sided with King Gustavus Adolphus of Sweden, Lommatzsch was burnt down in 1632 by Albrecht von Wallenstein's Imperial troops and again in 1645, after the Elector had switched sides, by Swedish forces under General Lennart Torstenson. Nevertheless, Saxony rose quickly after the war. Under Elector Frederick Augustus I, a Saxon stagecoach milestone was erected on the market square.

Date	Timeline of Events
1814	The church got a new organ.
1849	First newspaper, the Lommatzscher Anzeiger, appeared, prompted by the revolution.
1854	A court was built.
1857	The Gewerbeverein was founded.
1859	Inauguration of the school's main building.
1865	Foundation of the Freiwillige Feuerwehr.
1873	Disunion of church and school, resulting in two separate schools.
1878	Gymnasium was built.
1877	Railroad to Riesa and 1880 to Nossen was opened.
1909	A narrow-gauge railway the Schmalspurbahn to Meißen and 1911 to Döbeln was opened.
end of WWII	Front reached Lommatzsch.
25.–28. April 1945	Lommatzsch was conquered by the Soviet Union
29. April–5. Mai 1945	Lommatzsch was conquered back by the Germans. 36 people accused by the community as being foreign workers and a thief (a 16-year-old boy) were shot in front of the church by SS. After the fall of Berlin, the SS absconded and the Red Army again occupied Lommatzsch, an event viewed by the local population as a calamity.

== People ==
=== Honorary citizens ===
- Robert Volkmann, (1815-1883), composer

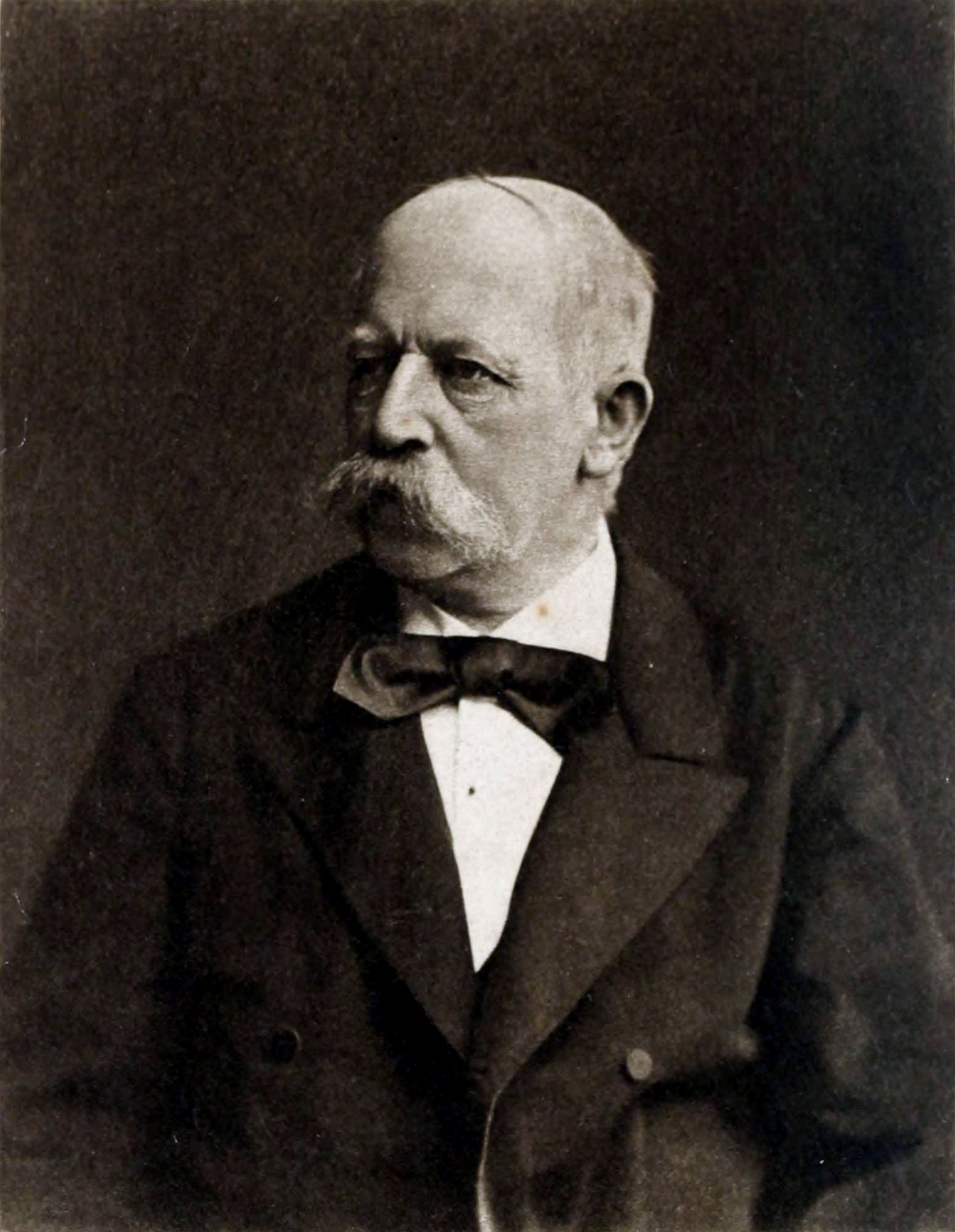
Robert Volkmann around 1880

- Carl Menzel, (1844-1923), entrepreneur for the production of glas
- Gerhard Menzel, (1911-1997), entrepreneur
- Terence Hill, (born 1939 as Mario Girotti), film star, spent part of his childhood in Lommatzsch, due to his mother coming from Saxony.

=== Sons and daughters of the town ===
- Hans Fährmann (1860-1940), composer and organist
- Reiner Frieske (born 1940), handball goalkeeper
- Horst Frank (1942-1962) died at the Berlin Wall
