= Franz Kullak =

German pianist and composer

Franz Kullak (12 April 1844 – 9 December 1913) was a German classical pianist and composer.

== Life ==
Born in Berlin, Kullak, the son of Theodor Kullak, studied at his father's Neue Akademie der Tonkunst in Berlin, which he continued after his father's death in 1882 and dissolved in 1890. As a teaching work he published:

- Der erste Klavierunterricht
- Der Fortschritt im Klavierspiel
- Die Harmonie auf dem Klavier

He composed the grand opera in 5 acts Ines de Castro (Berlin 1877), a jubilee overture, piano pieces and Lieder. In addition, he arranged numerous orchestral works (among others by Mozart and Beethoven) for piano and worked as a music critic and editor.

Kullak died in Berlin at the age of 69.

== Publications ==
- Der Vortrag in der Musik am Ende des 19. Jahrhunderts. F. E. C. Leuckart publisher, Leipzig 1898. Neuauflage Verlag: Kessinger Pub Co. 2010. ISBN 978-1-1677-5604-7
- Beethoven's piano-playing, with an essay on the execution of the trill: written as an introduction to a new critical edition of Beethoven's piano-forte concertos. Übersetzt aus dem Deutschen von Theodore Baker. Verlag: G. Schirmer, New York 1901
- Concert op. 19, B flat major, no. 2, with fingering and the complete orchestral accompaniment transcribed for pianoforte. Publisher: Steingräber, Leipzig 1885
- Concert D moll für Pianoforte. Publisher: Steingräber, Leipzig 1888
- Konzerte für Pianoforte / Beethoven; with fingering and the complete orchestral accompaniment transcribed for pianoforte. Publisher: Steingräber, Leipzig 1889
- Wolfgang Amadeus Mozart: Concertos for the Piano. (Two Pianos, Four Hands) Verlag: G. Schirmer, New York, 1986. ISBN 978-0-7935-6499-6
