= Reiner Sturm =

German murderer (1950–2003)

Reiner Sturm (1950 – 27 August 2003) was a German murderer who murdered two women in Wuppertal. While he was being sought, he murdered a man in Frankfurt because he suspected the man had recognized him. After he seriously injured two other inmates in jail, he remained in detention until the end of his life.

== Early life ==
Reiner Sturm's parents divorced when he was 15. After attending primary school, he completed two apprenticeships as a decorator and toolmaker. He then attended a sailing school in Bremen and went to sea for several years. Instead of becoming a captain, he became a pimp on the Reeperbahn in St. Pauli, Hamburg.

In 1974, he was involved in a bank robbery in Eschersheim, was arrested and sentenced to three years imprisonment, which he served in Frankfurt's Preungesheim Prison. There he met felon Heinz Otto Bartel, whom he began to admire. After his release, he broke up with his fiancée and best friend, found no work and accumulated debts in six figures. According to his own statements, he contemplated suicide at the time.

== Murders ==
On 19 July 1977, he murdered his 26-year-old ex-girlfriend Gabriele Evans in her Wuppertal apartment by knocking her down with a wine bottle, choking, throttling and stabbing her with a kitchen knife several times. Only two hours later, he also murdered his 23-year-old friend Marlies Roth, also in Wuppertal. Sturm struck the woman down with a hammer, strangled her with his bare hands, beat her with a whip and then killed her with a razor. At the scene of his first murder, he left a message in which he demanded that his friend Heinz Otto Bartel, sentenced to life imprisonment for murder, be released.

Sturm then fled to Frankfurt, where he found shelter in the apartment of 28-year-old banker Wolfgang Goeritz, whom he had met in a pub near the main station. In the following days, he returned to Wuppertal in order to kill, according to his own words, a hated acquaintance, but could not locate him and returned to Frankfurt. After a police search request on television appeared for Sturm, he decided to kill Goeritz and in the early morning of 25 July he stabbed him with a kitchen knife.

== Arrest, trial and imprisonment ==
After spending another day in Goeritz's apartment, he called a private detective, pretending to be his victim, and was taken to the nearest police station, claiming to have "an important clue." During the trip, the detective recognized Reiner Sturm, who immediately admitted that he was the culprit. He said that he couldn't resist killing a third person. He was immediately arrested at the police station in Nordend.

Sturm showed no regrets, mocking his victims, refusing to apologize to the bereaved and threatening to kill the prosecutor. He was sentenced on 23 November 1978 by the Wuppertal Landesgericht to life imprisonment for triple murder. Despite a noted severe mental abnormality, he was found to be fully culpable.

In custody, he brutally injured two fellow prisoners and was transferred to the high-security wings in Cologne Prison, where he spent most of his time in solitary confinement. There Sturm also had a visit from the criminalist Stephan Harbort, who spoke to him for seven hours. After that, Harbort said: "The then 47-year-old laughed not once during the first three hours of our conversation, he jumped up from his chair repeatedly, demonstrating how he had cruelly killed the two women. Told that he would like to have killed his father as well. Then this man finally tried to smile. It was a horrible grimace that suddenly flashed on me, barely describable in words. I did not see such a face before and after. I spontaneously thought that could be exactly what is commonly called 'evil'. A formative experience that still bothers me today."

Sturm was transferred to the Aachen Prison on 29 April 1998, where he was imprisoned until his death in 2003.

== Literature ==
- Stephan Harbort: The Hannibal Syndrome. The Serial Killer Phenomenon; Piper, 2003, ISBN 3-492-23650-2, S. 35ff (Case described with the codename Peter Windisch)
