= Reiner Hollich =

German footballer

Personal information
- Date of birth: 11 November 1955 (age 70)
- Place of birth: Mannheim, West Germany
- Position: Midfielder

Senior career*
Years	Team	Apps	(Gls)
1975–1978	Waldhof Mannheim	22	(0)
1978–1981	SV Sandhausen		
1981–1982	SV 98 Schwetzingen		
1982–?	ASV Feudenheim		

Managerial career
- 1988–1994: Waldhof Mannheim
- SG Oftersheim
- ASV Feudenheim
- TSG Weinheim
- 2006–2008: TSV Viernheim
- 2009–2010: Waldhof Mannheim II
- 2010–2013: Waldhof Mannheim
- * Club domestic league appearances and goals

Reiner Hollich (born 11 November 1955) is a German former footballer who played as a midfielder.
