= Robert Friedrich Karl Scholtz =

German painter

Robert Friedrich Karl Scholtz (14 April 1877 – 29 May 1956) was a German expressionist portrait and landscape painter, graphic artist and draughtsman. He belonged to the Berlin Secession mouvement.

== Life ==
Born in Dresden, Scholtz was the son of the Royal Saxon chamber virtuoso Hermann Scholtz and his wife Flora (née Nádler), a sister of the Budapest landscape painter Róbert Nádler. The Scholtz family came from Breslau, Silesia. He had three sisters. The home of pianist, music educator and composer Hermann Scholtz, who was best known as an interpreter of Chopin and editor of his collected works, served as a centre of Dresden's musical life, where some of the greats of the music world, including Edvard Grieg, Pyotr Ilyich Tchaikovsky, Hans von Bülow and Max Kalbeck frequented.

Scholtz began his training in 1894 with his uncle Róbert Nádler in Budapest and continued it in Dresden with Leon Pohle. In 1900, he went to Munich to study at the Kingliche Akademie der Bildenden Künste under Carl von Marr. He also began studying graphic art under Peter Halm. Around this time Scholtz acquired a small summer house in Landsberg am Lech where he met the painter and graphic artist Hubert von Herkomer, who strengthened his interest in graphic art. In addition to his skill at painting, Scholtz became known for his quick sketch work.

=== Activity ===
In 1903, Scholtz moved from Munich to Breslau, from where he travelled around Silesia and to Paris. In Breslau, he was known as a portraitist. In 1907, Scholtz married Eva Bercht from the Berlin banking family Paul Bercht and moved to Berlin shortly afterwards. There he felt at ease among the protagonists of the Berlin Secession, especially Lovis Corinth, Eugene Spiro and Leo von König, and became a member of the same. His flat was not far from the studio of Corinth, with whom he was close friends and became the godfather of his only child, Walter. Soon he was travelling abroad: in 1907 to Morocco and Spain; in 1908 to England, Ireland and France; in 1909 to Rome; in 1910 to Egypt, Italy and the Sudan; in 1911 to Italy, and in 1912 to Wales. During World War I, Scholtz took the opportunity to draw prisoners of war in the prison camp near Berlin. After the war, he travelled to Sweden and Finland. All his travels are reflected in his work. He was also represented at several art exhibitions: in 1906 in Breslau; in 1909 in Munich, Hamburg, Leipzig and Dresden; in 1913 in Budapest and in 1916 and 1927 in Dresden. In 1913, construction began on his house at 7/9 Schleinitzstrasse in Grunewald, which was completed during 1914. It was designed by the architect of the Berlin Radio Tower, Heinrich Straumer. There, Scholtz had extensive studio facilities for his artistic activities, including an etching room, printing room, exhibition space and studio.

=== Main years of work ===
Scholtz's most productive years were from 1901 to 1919 and from 1925 to 1926. In 1927, when Scholtz turned fifty, there was a large exhibition of his work at the Arnold Gallery in Dresden with portraits, lithographss and paintings by Jascha Heifetz, Lovis Corinth, Richard Strauss, Hans Pfitzner, Harry Liedtke, Brigitte Helm, his father and his mother. There were also some still lifes as well as landscapes with subjects from all over Europe. Hermann Uhde-Bernays wrote a Festschrift to mark the occasion.

A photograph with accompanying text about Scholtz appeared in 1931 in the Reichshandbuch der Deutschen Gesellschaft It was probably indicative of his lifestyle from the age of fifty onwards: elegantly dressed with dog sitting in a distinguished coach. From his fiftieth birthday in 1927, few more works by him are known. After the war, some of his earlier works were exhibited in various art exhibitions. In the last days of the Second World War, his house was completely destroyed by the approaching Soviet troops. Scholtz and his wife lived briefly at Trabenerstraße 4 and then at Bettinastraße 14 until his death at the age of 79, both in Grunewald.

== Work ==
In total, over 650 different works by Scholtz are mentioned in the literature (ref. 3-21): about 150 paintings, 40 watercolours, 170 etchings, 270 lithographs (including coloured lithographs) and 85 graphic works in mixed techniques (including drypoint, Weichgrundätzungvernis, aquatint). Many appear several times, such as Steamship in Dry Dock (1918, Liverpool), Poplar (1911), Lady in Riding Dress (1914) and others. Some others are not found in literature, but appeared only in the art trade. The whereabouts of most of his works are not known; only 11 paintings, two watercolours and about 30 prints have been located. The two paintings from the Berlin National Gallery disappeared after the war. Two works by Scholtz can be found in Berlin museums: Landscape with Lake painting in the Märkisches Museum (Berlin) and Adolf Menzel etching/Vernis-mou in the Kupferstichkabinett Berlin.

== Gravesite ==
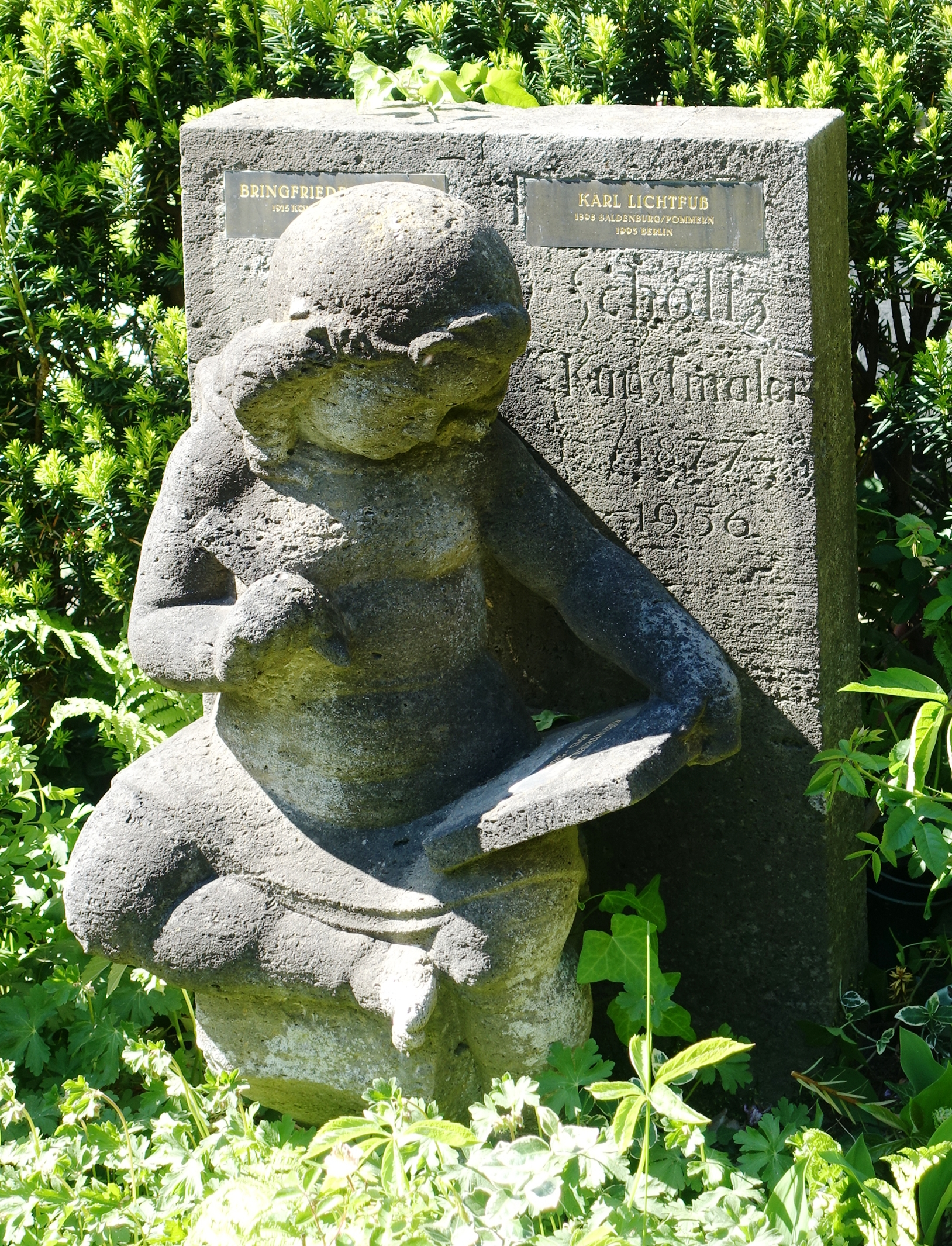
Lichtfuß grave site, formerly R.F.K. Scholtz

Sholtz was buried in 1956 at the Grunewald Cemetery. His grave is no longer preserved. The original gravestone with the inscription "Scholtz Kunstmaler" is still in use.
