= Franz Bendel =

German composer

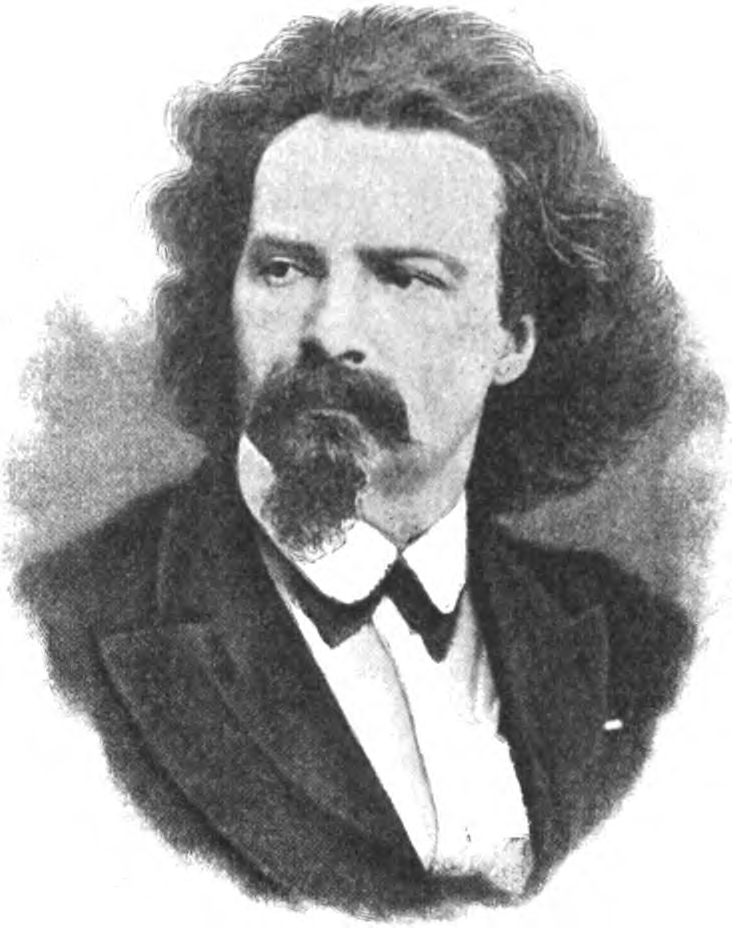
- Born: 23 March 1833; Schönlinde, Bohemia, Austrian Empire
- Died: 3 July 1874 (aged 41); Boston, Massachusetts, United States
- Occupations: Pianist and composer
- Style: Romantic

Franz Bendel (23 March 1833 – 3 July 1874) was a German Bohemian pianist, composer, and teacher.

Bendel was born in Schönlinde, Bohemia, Austrian Empire. He was a student of Franz Liszt for five years in Weimar. From 1862, he lived in Berlin and taught at Theodor Kullak's Music Academy, Neue Akademie der Tonkunst. He was also the author of over four hundred compositions, many of them for the piano, including one piano concerto.

Bendel was a superb pianist who toured extensively until his death from typhoid fever in Boston while on an American tour. He was aged 41.

== Life ==
Franz Bendel was a son of an elementary school teacher. After the first instruction from his father, he became a student of Josef Proksch. Through his teacher, who encouraged him very much, Bendel later went to Franz Liszt in Weimar, where he also met Wendelin Weißheimer.

In 1848, Count Otto von Westphal hired Bendel as a house and music teacher. He held this office for 14 years. Bendel had already emerged a composer by 1885, when Proksch performed a mass by him in Prague. In 1862, Bendel settled in Berlin and became a lecturer at the Neue Akademie der Tonkunst. He lived and worked there until his death, only interrupted by several small concert tours, such as Prague in 1863, which were praised in the press. In 1866, he also worked at Carl Tausig’s Schule des höheren Klavierspiels for some time.

As a performer as well as a creative artist, Bendel pursued the direction of the serious and solid, and his numerous trips accompanied by the best success (the last one even led him to America occasionally at the Boston Music Festival) were unable to detract from the ideality of his pursuit. He was even able to participate as a concert pianist at Patrick Gilmore’s National Peace Jubilee in Boston in 1872. Bendel was under an engagement with the Steinways for a series of eighty concerts in 1874, but typhoid fever caused his death after four days illness in July 1873. His grave monument is located in Berlin-Mitte, Oranienburg. First French Cemetery.

== Legacy ==
After his death, Bendel’s music lost much of its deserved recognition, coming as it did at a time when Wagner was revolutionizing. One of Bendel’s publishers, Augener & Co., based in London, and their journal, The Monthly Musical Record, continually reviewed his music after Bendel’s passing. In regard to his death, the journal stated, “much to be regretted, and will be regretted more and more, for the qualities of his compositions are becoming increasingly rare in pianoforte music.” Some of Bendel's notable students were Silas Pratt, Edward Morris Bowman, and Max Schwarz. He set text by Louise Strantz to music in his Wiegenlied.

== Style ==
Bendel was most active as a composer. Of his compositions, including four masses, symphonies, a piano concerto, and a piano trio; the salon-style piano works and numerous songs have found widespread use. The number of his compositions for the piano (light and descriptive pieces, Fantasias, Idylls & etc.) is over one hundred. The most admired are the Fantasias on a theme from Gounod's “Faust and Margaret,” Meyerbeer's “Afrikanerin,” and the Bohemian National songs (Op. 8, 45, and 47). In Bendel's tone poems, Franz Liszt's predilection for symphonic treatment also comes to the fore. The powerful way of performing as a piano virtuoso had also become his own. Bendel's teaching under Proksch kept a remnant of inclination for seriousness and solidity in his composition.

Similar to the nocturnes of John Field, Bendel wrote many Stimmungsbilder (mood pictures). His preference for mountain trips were expressed with a series of these types of pieces, with examples from Schweizer Bilder, Op. 137, and books Am Genfer See Op. 139. Some of these pieces were accompanied with a brief explanation of the content. When describing these pieces, C.F. Weitzman says, “Bendel portrays the impressions of his journeyings in the fresh air of the valleys and heights of Switzerland; and in the “Sechs deutsche Märchenbilder” (Op. 135, Hamburg, Hugo Pohle), illustrated with more striking colors, the dream-like, weird, and bizarre scenes of these Fantasiestücke pass before our inner vision with dramatic animation.”

For a span of time, The Monthly Musical Record reviewed Bendel's works, giving description of his different approaches to his own style. The journal introduced his Rococo-Tanz with this quote: “Now, Franz Bendel did not simulate qualities he did not possess; but, on the contrary, cheerfully applied himself to the cultivation of the gifts he had been endowed with, which, moreover, were worth at least as much as many gifts of a prouder and more pretentious nature. What we find in his works is elegance, grace, ease, and charm in thought, feeling, and expression, and along with this an always effective pianoforte language.”

== Selected Compositions ==
- 2 Barcarollen, Op. 5
1. Napoli
2. Venezia
- Il Baccio, Celebre Valze d'Artini, Transcription de Concert, Op. 7
- Fantasie sur de Airs bohèmiens nationaux, Op. 8
- Souvenir de Hongrie, Polka de Concert, Op. 9
- 3 Characteristische Stücke, Op. 10
1. Am Sontag Morgen, Idylle
2. Scherzetto
3. Romanze
- Weihnacht Idylle, Op. 11
- Nizza, Barcarolle, Op. 13
- Mozart, Op. 14
1. Andante Favori
2. Menuet Favori
3. Adagio Favori
- 4 Poesion, Op. 15
1. Nocturne
2. Schummerlied
3. Frühlingstraum
4. Rublick, Lied ohne Worte
- Grand Fantasie sur l'Opera: Faust de Guonod, Op. 17
- 3 Grandes Valses, Op. 18
- Sexten Etude, Op. 27
- La Coquette, Op. 29
- La Clochette, Op. 30
- 4 Klavierstücke, Op. 40
1. Scherzetto
2. Nocturno
3. Schummerlied
4. Kleiner Walzer
- 4 Klavierstücke, Op. 41
1. Impromptu
2. Lied ohne Worte
3. Etwas Seltames
4. Leid ohne Worte
- Souvenir de Tyrol, Op. 49
- Polkas de Salon pour le Piano, Op.58. No.1 Polka gracieuse No.2 Polka de la Jeunesse heureuse (B. Schott's Söhnen, Mainz, Sweet Remembrance (In the Gondola),
- 3 Idyllen, Op. 71
- Poetische Stunden am Klavier, Op. 73
- Polka brillante, Op. 81
- Galopp, Op. 86
- Souvenir d'Innsbruck (Tyrolliene de Salon), Op. 90
- Nocturne, Op. 92
- Afrikanerin, Op. 101
- 2 Pieces, Op. 105
1. Souvenir de Ischl
2. Ricordanza
- Kriegsbilder, Op. 109
1. Elegie, auf dem Tod eines gefallen Helden
2. Zug munterer Krieger
3. Der Sieger Heimkehr
- Erinnerungsblätter, Op. 110
1. Abshied von der Geliebten
2. Von der Schlacht
3. Die Heimkehr
- 3 Pieces, Op. 111, no. 3: Hommage a Chopin
- Repertoire de Concert, Op. 124
1. Don Juan de Mozart
2. Freischütz de Weber
3. Lucrezia Borgia de Donizetti
4. Le Muetta d'Auber
5. Les Huguenotes de Meyerbeer
6. Ballo in maschera de Verdi
- Rococo-Tanz, Op. 126
- Valse de Concert, Op. 128
- 6 Deutsche Märchenbilder, Op. 135
1. Frau Holle
2. Schneewittchen
3. Aschenbrödel
4. Die Bremer Stadtmusikanten
5. Rothkäppchen
6. Hans im Glück
- Schweizer Bilder, Op. 137
1. Abends auf der Heinwehfluh
2. Alpenglühen der Jungfrau
3. Auf dem Vierwaldstätter See
4. Silberquelle im Chamouny-Tal
- Am Genfer See, Op. 139
1. Sonntagsmorgen auf Glion
2. Promenade á Châtelard, Bosquet de Julie
3. Mondscheinfarht nach der Liebesinsel
4. Goldelfest in Vevey
5. Abschied von Genf
- 6 Etuden, Op. 138
- Improvisation on the Weigenlied by Johannes Brahms, Op. 141
- Piano Trio, Op. posth. no. 2

== Sources ==
- Etude, vol. 15, no. 9, September, 1907
- Rudolf Müller: "Bendel, Franz." In: Allgemeine Deutsche Biographie (ADB). Band 46, Duncker & Humblot, Leipzig 1902, S. 347 f.
- The Monthly Musical Record, vol. 20–23, 1889-1893
- Bomberger, E. Douglas, Brainard’s Biographies of American Musicians (Connecticut: Greenwood Press) 1999.
- Flamant, Alexander, The Realm of Tones: Three Hundred and Two Portraits of the Most Celebrated European Musician with Short Biographical Notices (New York: Edward Schuberth & Co.), 1882.
- Bendel profile, usc.edu. Accessed November 11, 2022.
