= Reiner Stenzel =

American experimental plasma physicist

- Born: Reiner Ludwig Stenzel; 1940; Germany
- Died: December 9, 2023 (aged 83–84); San Francisco, California
- Education: Technical University of Braunschweig (Dipl. Ing.); California Institute of Technology (Ph.D.)
- Scientific career
- Fields: Plasma physics
- Workplaces: UCLA
- Thesis: Microwave absorption and emission from magnetized afterglow plasmas (1970)
- Doctoral advisor: Roy W. Gould

Reiner Ludwig Stenzel (1940 – December 9, 2023) was an American plasma physicist and professor emeritus at the University of California, Los Angeles (UCLA). He was known for his experimental work in basic plasma physics, such as on whistler waves and magnetic reconnection, and had contributed to the development of various plasma probes and antennas, which included the microwave resonator (hairpin) probe. He was a fellow of the American Physical Society.

== Early life and career ==
Stenzel completed his undergraduate education and received a Diplom-Ingenieur (Dipl.-Ing.) from the Technische Hochschule Braunschweig in 1965. He then obtained a Ph.D. from the California Institute of Technology in 1970. His doctoral advisor was Roy W. Gould, and for his dissertation, he worked on measuring the radiation and absorption of electromagnetic energy in a magnetized plasma column.

Upon graduation, Stenzel continued working at Caltech as a postdoc. He also held research and teaching positions at UCLA in conjunction with TRW Inc. until 1976. In 1977, Stenzel joined UCLA physics department as an associate professor, and has been there ever since until his retirement in 2011.

Stenzel held visiting professorship appointments at the University of Tokyo in 1980, University of Paris in 1995, and the University of Innsbruck in 2007.

== Honors and awards ==
In 1993, Stenzel was inducted as a fellow of the American Physical Society for "pioneering studies and major advances in nonlinear energy conversion processes in plasmas, including unprecedented detailed measurements of RF and whistler wave interactions, magnetic field reconnection and current disruptions".

== Personal life ==
Stenzel was married to Hatsuko Arima, and had three children, Andreas Ryuta, Anabel and Isabel. His two daughters were both diagnosed with cystic fibrosis and were the subjects of the documentary The Power of Two.

Stenzel was also an avid climber and served as Vice Chair of the Sierra Peaks Section from 2004 to 2006.
