= Reiner Lemoine =

German entrepreneur (1949–2006)

Reiner Lemoine (2 February 1949 – 6 December 2006) was a German entrepreneur in the area of renewable energy.

During his studies of aerospace engineering he co-founded Wuseltronik, a socialistic collective for engineering based in Berlin-Kreuzberg. In 1996 he co-founded Solon AG, followed in 1999 by the solar cell manufacturer Q-Cells. In 2005 he was awarded as "Entrepreneur of the year" together with Anton Milner for Q-Cells.

Shortly before this death in December 2006 he founded the Reiner Lemoine Foundation which offers stipends for Ph.D. candidates in the area of renewable energies. On 20 August 2008 the German Minister of Environment Sigmar Gabriel inaugurated the Reiner-Lemoine-Research Center at Q-Cells SE.
