= Reiner Frieske =

German handball player (born 1940)

Personal information
- Full name: Reiner Frieske
- Nationality: East German
- Born: October 11, 1940 (age 85) Lommatzsch

Sport
- Country: East German
- Sport: Handball
- Position: goalkeeper
- Club: ASK Vorwärts Berlin; ASK Vorwärts Frankfurt

Reiner Frieske (born October 11, 1940 in Lommatzsch) is an East German former handball player who competed in the 1972 Summer Olympics.

In 1972 he was part of the East German team which finished fourth in the Olympic tournament. He played all six matches as goalkeeper.
