= Trombone =

Brass instrument

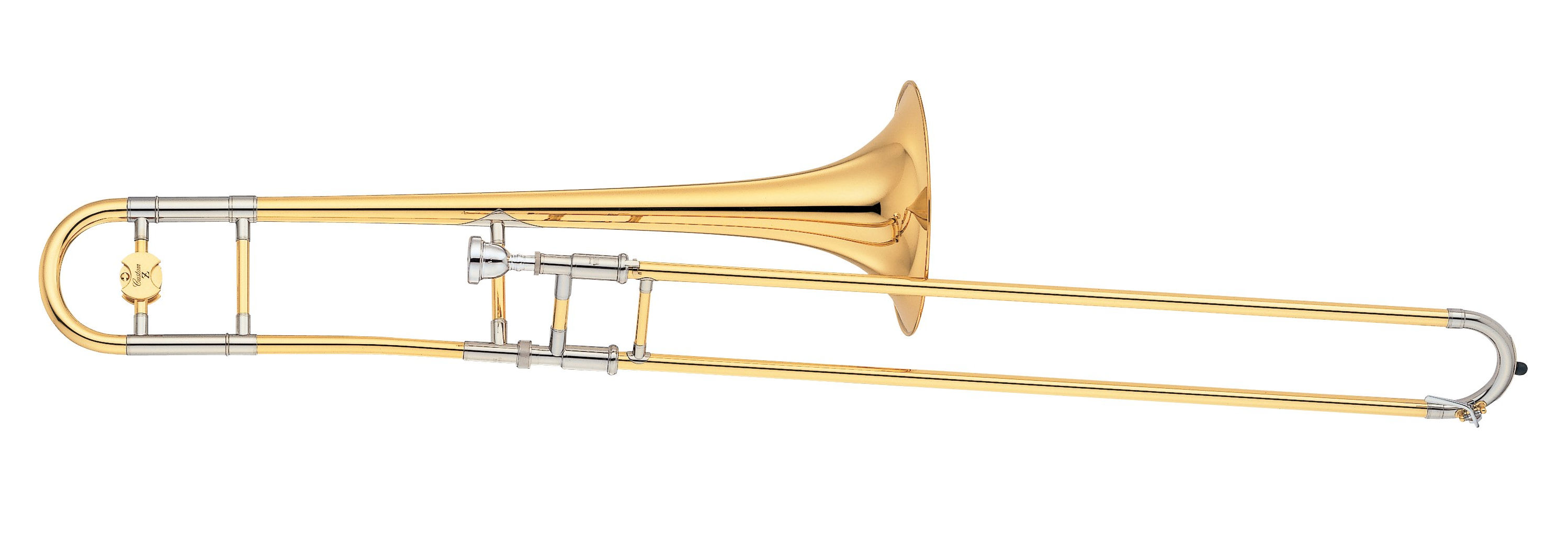
- A tenor trombone

Brass instrument
- Classification: Wind; Brass; Aerophone
- Hornbostel–Sachs classification: 423.22 (Sliding aerophone sounded by lip vibration)
- Developed: Originated mid 15th century, sackbut in English until the early 18th century.

Playing range
- Range of the tenor trombone. Ranges marked "F" are only possible with an F attachment; low B is only possible if the tuning slide of the F attachment is pulled out to E. For other trombones, see § Types.

Related instruments
- Sackbut; Buccin; Trumpet; Bass Trumpet; Cimbasso

Musicians
- List of classical trombonists; List of jazz trombonists

The trombone is a musical instrument in the brass family. As with all brass instruments, sound is produced when the player's lips vibrate inside a mouthpiece, causing the air column inside the instrument to vibrate. Nearly all trombones use a telescoping slide mechanism to alter the pitch instead of the valves used by other brass instruments. The valve trombone is an exception, using three valves similar to those on a trumpet, and the superbone has valves and a slide.

The word trombone derives from Italian tromba (trumpet) and -one (a suffix meaning 'large'), so the name means 'large trumpet'. The trombone has a predominantly cylindrical bore like the trumpet, in contrast to the more conical brass instruments like the cornet, the flugelhorn, the baritone, and the euphonium. The two most frequently encountered variants are the tenor trombone and bass trombone; when the word trombone is mentioned alone; it is mostly taken to mean the tenor. These are treated as non-transposing instruments, reading at concert pitch in bass clef, with higher notes sometimes being notated in tenor clef. They are pitched in B♭, an octave below the B♭ trumpet and an octave above the B♭ contrabass tuba. The E♭ alto trombone became less common as improvements in technique extended the upper range of the tenor, but it is regaining popularity for its lighter sonority. In British brass-band music the tenor trombone is treated as a B♭ transposing instrument, written in treble clef, and the alto trombone is written at concert pitch, usually in alto clef.

A person who plays the trombone is called a trombonist or trombone player.

== History ==
=== Etymology ===
Trombone comes from the Italian word tromba (trumpet), with the suffix -one (large).

During the Renaissance, the equivalent English term was sackbut. The word first appears in court records in 1495 as shakbusshe. Shakbusshe is similar to sacabuche, attested in Spain as early as 1478. The French equivalent saqueboute appears in 1466.

The German Posaune, ultimately from Latin būcina, long predates the invention of the slide and could refer to a natural trumpet as late as the early fifteenth century.

=== Origin ===
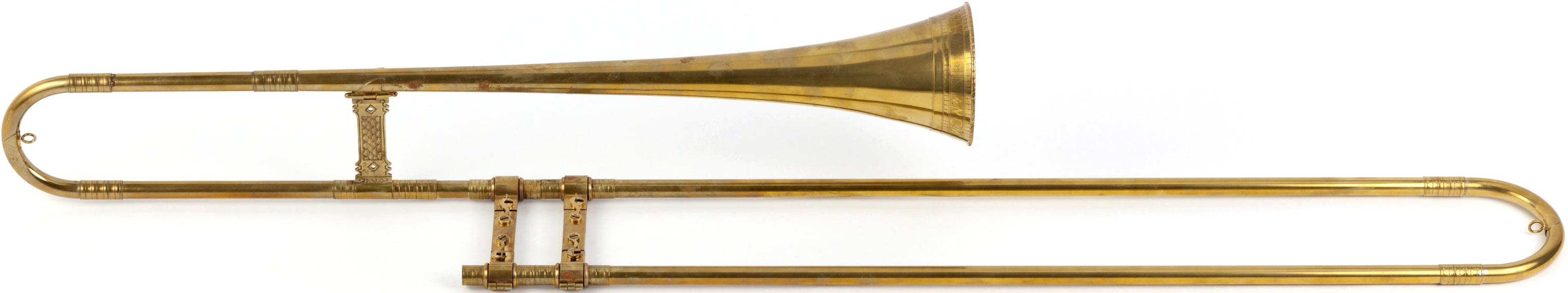
Renaissance era tenor sackbut (replica by Frank Tomes, London)

The sackbut appeared in the 15th century and was used extensively across Europe, declining in most places by the mid to late 17th century. It was used in outdoor events, in concert, and in liturgical settings. Its principal role was as the contratenor part in a dance band. It was also used, along with shawms, in bands sponsored by towns and courts. Trumpeters and trombonists were employed in German city-states to stand watch in the city towers and herald the arrival of important people to the city, an activity that signified wealth and strength in 16th-century German cities. These heralding trombonists were often viewed separately from the more skilled trombonists who played in groups such as the alta capella wind ensembles and the first orchestral ensembles, which performed in religious settings such as St Mark's Basilica in Venice in the early 17th century. The 17th-century trombone had slightly smaller dimensions than a modern trombone, with a bell that was more conical and less flared. Modern period performers use the term "sackbut" to distinguish this earlier version of the trombone from the modern instrument.

Composers who wrote for trombone during this period include Claudio Monteverdi, Heinrich Schütz, Giovanni Gabrieli and his uncle Andrea Gabrieli. The trombone doubled voice parts in sacred works, but there are also solo pieces written for trombone in the early 17th century.

When the sackbut returned to common use in England in the 18th century, Italian music was so influential that the instrument became known by its Italian name, "trombone". Its name remained constant in Italy (trombone) and in Germany (Posaune).

During the later Baroque period, Johann Sebastian Bach and George Frideric Handel used trombones on a few occasions. Bach called for a tromba di tirarsi, which may have been a form of the closely related slide trumpet, to double the cantus firmus in some liturgical cantatas. He also employed a choir of four trombones to double the chorus in three of his cantatas (BWV 2, BWV 21 and BWV 38). Because of the relative scarcity of trombones, their solo parts were generally interchangeable with other instruments.

=== Classical period ===
The construction of the trombone did not change very much between the Baroque and Classical period, but the bell became slightly more flared. Christoph Willibald Gluck was the first major composer to use the trombone in an opera overture, in the opera Alceste (1767). He also used it in the operas Orfeo ed Euridice, Iphigénie en Tauride (1779), and Echo et Narcisse.

Early Classical composers occasionally included concertante movements with alto trombone as a solo instrument in divertimenti and serenades; these movements are often extracted from the multi-movement works and performed as standalone alto trombone concerti. Examples include the Serenade in E♭ (1755) by Leopold Mozart and Divertimento in D major (1764) by Michael Haydn. The earliest known independent trombone concerto is probably the Concerto for Alto trombone and Strings in B♭ (1769) by Johann Georg Albrechtsberger.

Mozart used the trombone in operas (notably in scenes featuring the Commendatore in Don Giovanni) and in sacred music. The prominent solo part in the Tuba Mirum section of his Requiem became a staple audition piece for the instrument. Aside from solo parts, Mozart's orchestration usually features a trio of alto, tenor and bass trombones, doubling the respective voices in the choir. The earliest known symphony featuring a trombone section is Symphony in C minor by Anton Zimmermann. The date is uncertain but it is most probably from the peak of the composer's activity in the 1770s. The earliest confident date for introducing the trombone to the symphony is therefore Zimmermann's death in 1781.

==== Transition to Romantic period ====
Symphony in E♭ (1807) by Swedish composer Joachim Nicolas Eggert features an independent trombone part. Ludwig van Beethoven is sometimes mistakenly credited with the trombone's introduction into the orchestra, having used it shortly afterwards in his Symphony No. 5 in C minor (1808), Symphony No. 6 in F major ("Pastoral"), and Symphony No. 9 ("Choral").

=== Romantic period ===
==== 19th-century orchestras ====
Trombones were included in operas, symphonies, and other compositions by Felix Mendelssohn, Ludwig van Beethoven, Hector Berlioz, Franz Berwald, Charles Gounod, Franz Liszt, Gioacchino Rossini, Franz Schubert, Robert Schumann, Giuseppe Verdi, and Richard Wagner, and others.

The trombone trio was combined with one or two cornetts during the Renaissance and early Baroque periods. The replacement of cornetts with oboes and clarinets did not change the trombone's role as a support to the alto, tenor, and bass voices of the chorus (usually in ecclesiastical settings), whose moving harmonic lines were more difficult to pick out than the melodic soprano line. The introduction of trombones into the orchestra allied them more closely with trumpets, and soon a tenor trombone replaced the alto. The Germans and Austrians kept alto trombone somewhat longer than the French, who preferred a section of three tenor trombones until after the Second World War. In other countries, the trio of two tenor trombones and one bass became standard by about the mid-19th century.

Trombonists were employed less by court orchestras and cathedrals, who had been providing the instruments. Military musicians were provided with instruments, and instruments like the long F or E♭ bass trombone remained in military use until around the First World War. Orchestral musicians adopted the tenor trombone, as it could generally play any of the three trombone parts in orchestral scores.

Valve trombones in the mid-19th century did little to alter the make-up of the orchestral trombone section. While its use declined in German and French orchestras, the valve trombone remained popular in some countries, including Italy and Bohemia, almost to the exclusion of the slide instrument. Composers such as Giuseppe Verdi, Giacomo Puccini, Bedřich Smetana, and Antonín Dvořák scored for a valve trombone section.

Trombone solo
from Mahler's 3rd Symphony, 1st movement (composed 1893–1896)

As the ophicleide or the tuba was added to the orchestra during the 19th century, bass trombone parts were scored in a higher register than previously. The bass trombone regained some independence in the early 20th century. Experiments with the trombone section included Richard Wagner's addition of a contrabass trombone in Der Ring des Nibelungen and Gustav Mahler's and Richard Strauss' addition of a second bass trombone to the usual trio of two tenors and one bass. The majority of orchestral works are still scored for the usual mid- to late-19th-century low brass section of two tenor trombones, one bass trombone, and one tuba.

==== 19th-century wind bands ====
Wind bands began being created during the French Revolution of 1791 and have always included some form of trombones. These instruments became more established in the 19th century and included circus bands, military bands, brass bands (primarily in the United Kingdom), and town bands (primarily in the United States). Some of these, especially military bands in Europe, used rear-facing trombones with the bell pointing behind the player's left shoulder. These bands played a limited repertoire that consisted mainly of orchestral transcriptions, arrangements of popular and patriotic tunes, and feature pieces for soloists (usually cornetists, singers, and violinists). A notable work for wind band is Berlioz's 1840 Grande symphonie funèbre et triomphale, which uses a trombone solo for the entirety of its second movement. Toward the end of the 19th century, trombone virtuosi began appearing as soloists in American wind bands. Arthur Pryor, who had played in the John Philip Sousa band and eventually formed his own band, was one of the most famous of these 19th century trombonists.

==== 19th-century pedagogy ====
In the Romantic era, Leipzig became a center of trombone pedagogy, and the instrument was taught at the Musikhochschule founded by Felix Mendelssohn Bartholdy. The Paris Conservatory and its yearly exhibition also contributed to trombone education. At the Leipzig academy, Mendelssohn's bass trombonist, Karl Traugott Queisser, was the first in a long line of distinguished professors of the trombone. Several composers wrote works for Queisser, including Mendelssohn's concertmaster Ferdinand David, Ernst Sachse, and Friedrich August Belcke. David wrote his Concertino for Trombone and Orchestra in 1837, and Sachse's solo works remain popular in Germany. Queisser championed and popularized Christian Friedrich Sattler's tenor-bass trombone during the 1840s, leading to its widespread use in orchestras throughout Germany and Austria.

==== 19th-century construction ====
Sattler had a great influence on trombone design, introducing a significantly larger bore (the most important innovation since the Renaissance), Schlangenverzierungen (snake decorations), the bell garland, and the wide bell flare. These features were widely copied during the 19th century and are still found on German made trombones.

The trombone was improved in the 19th century with the addition of "stockings" at the end of the inner slide to reduce friction, and the development of the water key to expel condensation from the horn. German instrument maker Christian Friedrich Sattler in 1821 created the Tenorbaßposaune (lit. 'tenor-bass trombone'), a tenor in B♭ built with the larger bore and mouthpiece from the F bass trombone, which facilitated playing bass trombone parts in the low register. After the invention of valves, valve trombones appeared as early as the 1830s, and by the 1850s were in common use in Italy and Austria.

In 1839, Sattler invented the Quartventil (lit. 'fourth valve'), a rotary valve and loop of extra tubing attached to the bell section of a tenor trombone, which lowered the instrument a fourth into F. Intended to bridge the range gap of the tenor trombone between E_{2} and the first B♭_{1} pedal tone, it was quickly adopted for bass trombone parts, particularly in Germany.

=== Twentieth century ===
"Miss Trombone"
1908 ragtime by Henry Fillmore; played by The Indestructible Military Band

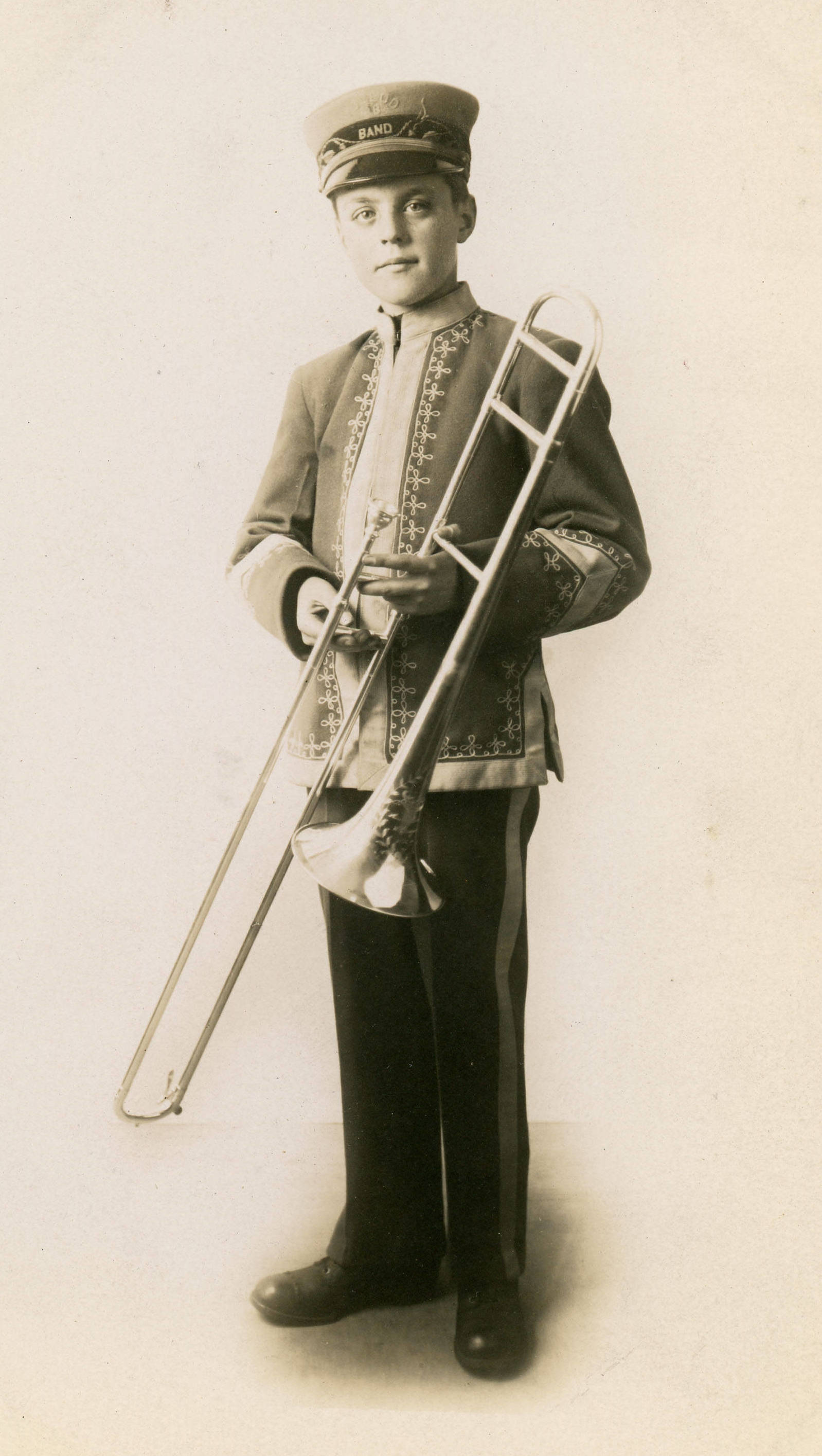
Newsboy Military Band Member with Trombone, Toledo, Ohio

With the rise of recorded music and music schools, orchestral trombone sections around the world began to have a more consistent idea of a standard trombone sound. In the 1940s, British orchestras abandoned the use of small bore tenors and G basses in favor of the American/German choice of large bore tenors and B♭ basses. French orchestras did the same in the 1960s.

==== Use in jazz ====
In the 1900s the trombone and the tuba played bass lines and outlined chords to support improvisation by the higher-pitched instruments. It began to be used as a solo instrument during the swing era of the mid-1920s. Jack Teagarden and J. J. Johnson were early trombone soloists.

==== 20th-century construction ====
The trombone's construction changed in the 20th century. Different materials were used, mouthpiece, bore, and bell dimensions increased, and different mutes and valves were developed. Despite the overall trend towards larger bore instruments, many European trombone makers prefer a slightly smaller bore than their American counterparts.

One of the most significant changes was the development of the F-attachment trigger. Through the mid-20th century there was no need for orchestral trombonists to use instruments with the F attachment trigger. As contemporary composers such as Mahler began to write lower passages for the trombone, the trigger became necessary.

=== Contemporary use ===
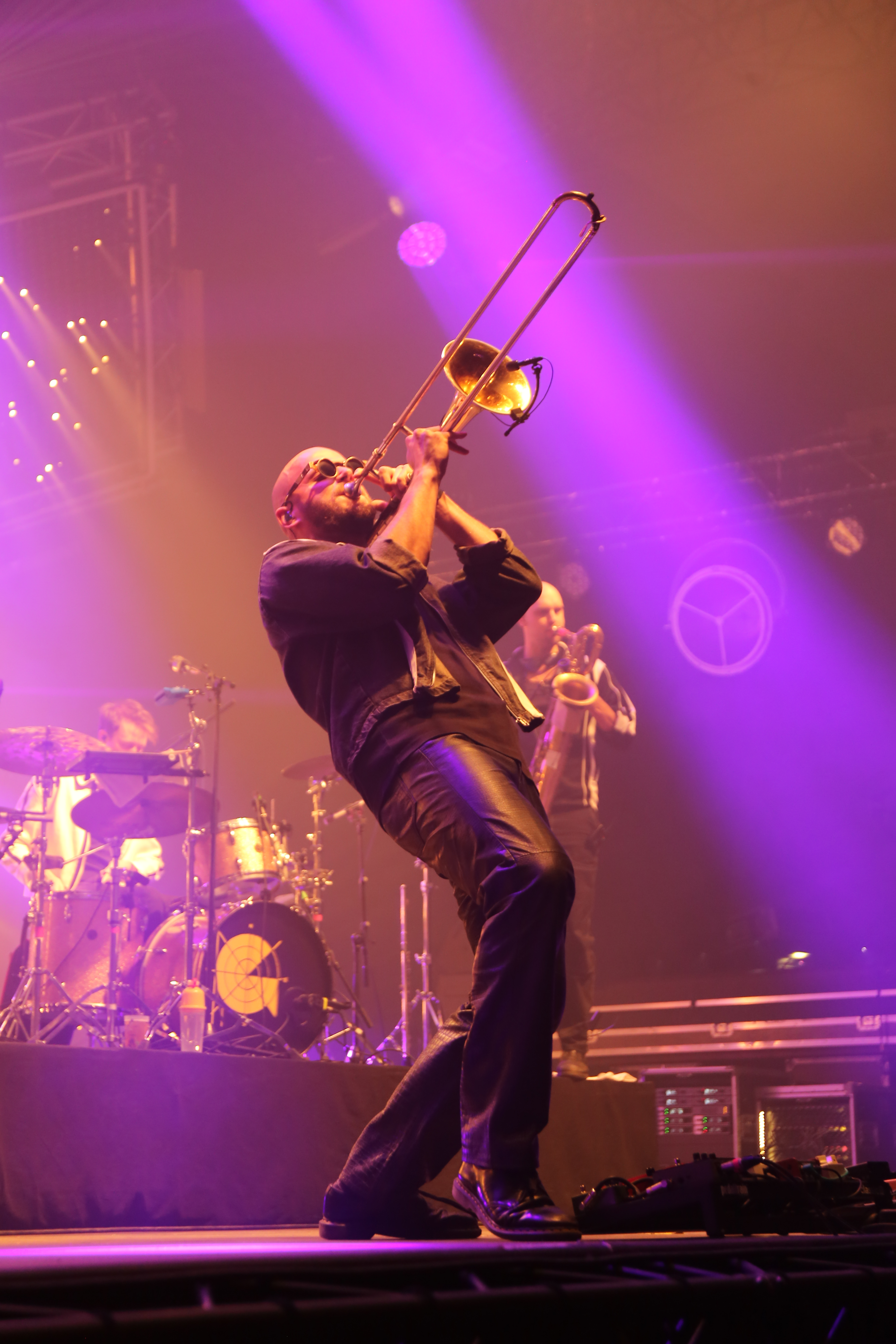
Gallowstreet's trombonist at Trans Musicales 2024, Rennes, France

The trombone can be found in symphony orchestras, concert bands, big bands, marching bands, military bands, brass bands, and brass choirs. In chamber music, it is used in brass quintets, quartets, and trios, and also in trombone groups ranging from trios to choirs. A trombone choir can vary in size from five to twenty or more members. Trombones are also common in swing, jazz, merengue, salsa, R&B, ska, and New Orleans brass bands.

In contemporary experimental music, John Cage's collaboration with Frank Rehak, Solo for sliding trombone (1957/58), and Luciano Berio's Sequenza V (1966) for solo trombone, influenced composers and performers such as Stuart Dempster, Vinko Globokar, and Mike Svoboda. Solo and chamber music compositions in this style may utilize extended techniques, including vocalized, multiphonic, and percussive sounds. The trombone's slide enables the use of microtonality, and modifying the F-attachment can be used to control a second bell or other instruments.

== Construction ==
Basic trombone anatomy
1. tuning slide 2. counterweight 3. mouthpiece 4. slide lock ring 5. bell 6. knob/bumper 7. water key/spit valve 8. main slide 9. second slide brace/stay 10. first slide brace/stay 11. bell lock nut

The trombone is a predominantly cylindrical tube with two U-shaped bends and a flared bell at the end. The tubing is approximately cylindrical but contains a complex series of tapers which affect the instrument's intonation. As with other brass instruments, sound is produced by blowing air through pursed lips producing a vibration that creates a standing wave in the instrument.

The detachable cup-shaped mouthpiece is similar to that of the baritone horn and closely related to that of the trumpet. It has a venturi: a small constriction of the air column that adds resistance, greatly affecting the tone of the instrument. The slide section consists of a leadpipe, inner and outer slide tubes, and bracing, or "stays". The soldered stays on modern instruments replaced the loose stays found on sackbuts (medieval precursors to trombones).

The most distinctive feature of the trombone is the slide, which is used to change the length of the tubing to alter the pitch (cf. valve trombone). During the Renaissance, sleeves (called "stockings") were developed to decrease friction that would impede the slide's motion. These were soldered onto the ends of the inner slide tubes to slightly increase their diameter. The ends of inner slides on modern instruments are manufactured with a slightly larger diameter to achieve the same end. This part of the slide must be lubricated frequently. The slide section is connected to the bell section by the neckpipe and a U-bend called the bell or back bow. The joint connecting the slide and bell sections has a threaded collar to secure the connection. Prior to the early 20th century this connection was made with friction joints alone.

Trombones typically have a short tuning slide in the U-shaped bend between the neckpipe and the bell, a feature designed by the French maker François Riedlocker in the early 19th century. It was incorporated into French and British designs, and later into German and American models, although German trombones were built without tuning slides well into the 20th century. This configuration places the tuning slide, which must be cylindrical, in a section of the tubing that is otherwise slightly conical. In the early- to mid-20th century, manufacturers experimented with a "tuning in the slide" configuration, placing the tuning slide in the cylindrical main slide so the bell section can have an uninterrupted conical taper. Because it adds weight to the main slide and is difficult to align properly, this design was largely abandoned. Some trombone makers have begun using this design again, with improved manufacturing techniques and lighter materials.

Many types of trombone also include one or more rotary valves connected to additional tubing which lengthens the instrument. This extends the low range of the instrument and creates the option of using alternate slide positions for many notes.

Like the trumpet, the trombone is considered a cylindrical bore instrument since it has extensive sections of tubing that are of unchanging diameter (the slide section must be cylindrical in order to function). Tenor trombones typically have a bore of 0.450 inches (11.4 mm) (small bore) to 0.547 inches (13.9 mm) (large or orchestral bore) after the leadpipe and through the slide. The bore expands through the bow to the bell, which is typically between 7 and 8 1/2 inches (18 and 22 cm). A number of common variations on trombone construction are noted below.

=== Bells ===
Trombone bells (and sometimes slides) may be constructed of different brass mixtures. The most common material is yellow brass (70% copper, 30% zinc), but other materials include rose brass (85% copper, 15% zinc) and red brass (90% copper, 10% zinc). Some manufacturers offer interchangeable bells. Tenor trombone bells are usually between 7 and 9 in (18–23 cm) in diameter, with most being between 7 1/2 and 8 1/2 in (19–22 cm). The smallest sizes are found on jazz trombones and older narrow-bore instruments, while the larger sizes are common on orchestral models. Bass trombone bells can be 10 1/2 in (27 cm) or more, with most being between 9 1/2 and 10 in (24 and 25 cm). The bell may be made from two separate brass sheets or from one single piece of metal, hammered on a mandrel to shape it. The edge of the bell may be finished with or without a piece of bell wire to secure it, which also affects the tone quality; most bells are built with bell wire. Occasionally, trombone bells are made from solid sterling silver.

=== Valve attachments ===
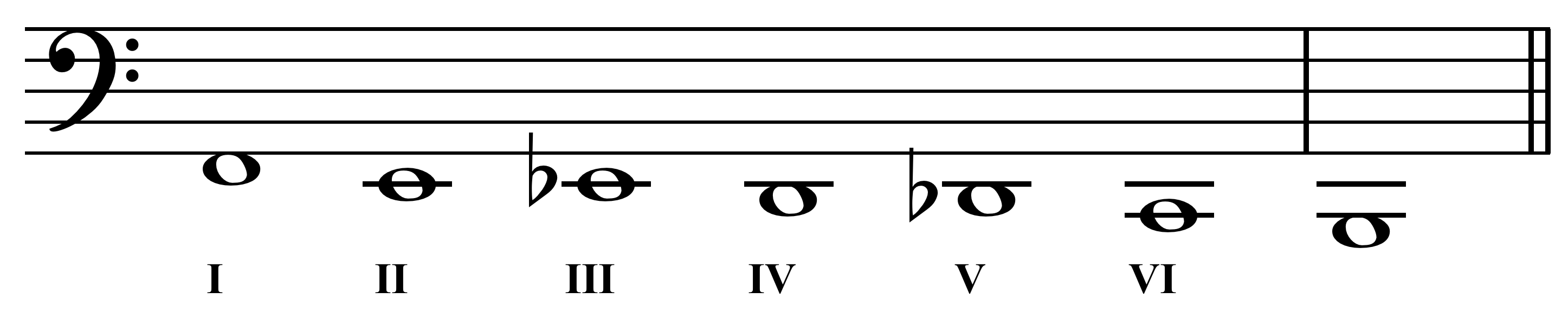
Trombone with F attachment slide position second harmonics.

Modern trombones are often constructed with a valve attachment, an extra loop of tubing attached to the bell section and engaged by a valve operated by the left thumb by means of a lever or trigger. The extra length of tubing allows the instrument to play lower notes, but also creates the option of using alternate slide positions for some notes, which can be helpful for executing some difficult music passages or trills.

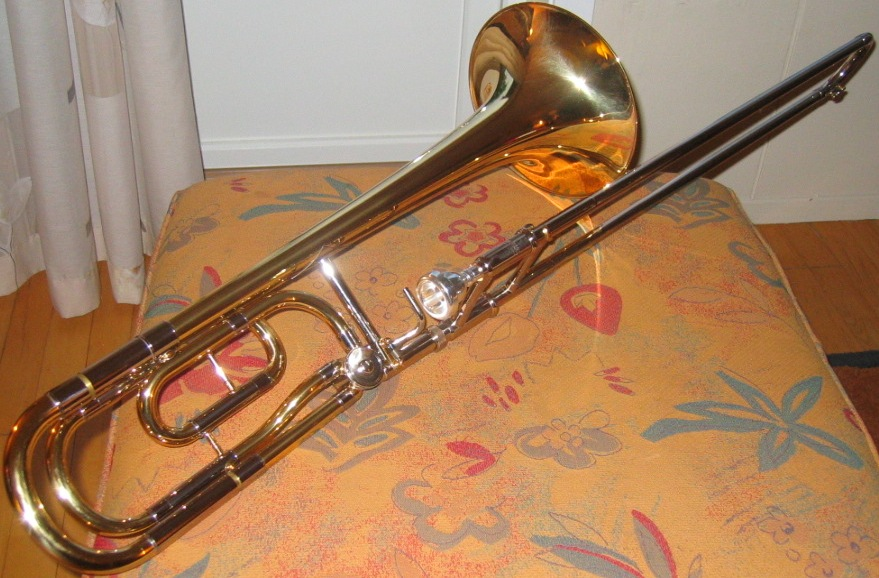
Tenor trombone with a traditional wrap F attachment

The valve attachment was originally developed by German instrument maker Christian Friedrich Sattler in the late 1830s for the Tenorbaßposaune (lit. 'tenor-bass trombone'), a B♭ tenor trombone built with the wider bore and larger bell of a bass trombone that Sattler had earlier invented in 1821. Sattler's valve attachment added about 3 feet (0.9 m) of tubing to lower the fundamental pitch from B♭ to F via the use of a rotary valve, a design that has essentially remained unchanged.

Valve attachments are most commonly found on the tenor and bass trombones, but can be found on other sizes of trombone, with differing lengths of tubing.

Soprano
In the early 2010s Torbjörn Hultmark of the Royal College of Music commissioned the first soprano trombone in B♭ with an F valve, built by Thein Brass.

Alto
Although rare on the E♭ alto trombone, a valve attachment usually lowers the instrument a perfect fourth into B♭, providing the first five or six positions from the tenor trombone slide. Some alto models also have a valve called a trill valve, providing a small loop of tubing that lowers the instrument by only a minor or major second (to D or D♭).

Tenor
Tenor trombones, especially the larger bore symphonic models, commonly have a valve attachment which lowers the instrument from B♭ to F.

It provides access to the otherwise missing notes between the pedal B♭_{1} in first position, and the second partial E_{2} in seventh, as well as providing alternate slide positions for other notes in long (sixth and seventh) positions. Because the attachment tubing increases the length of the overall instrument by one-third, the distances between slide positions must also be one-third longer when the valve is engaged, resulting in only six positions available on the F slide, to low C_{2}. Thus, the F attachment cannot provide the low B♮_{1}, but it usually has a sufficiently long tuning slide to lower it into E as required, which will provide B♮_{1} in a very long position.

Bass
The modern bass trombone usually has two valve attachments to provide all of the notes that are absent on an instrument with no valves (B♮_{1} – E_{2}). This allows the player to produce a complete chromatic range upwards from the pedal register.

The first valve is an F attachment the same as that found on a tenor trombone and extends the range down to C_{2}. The second valve, engaged together with the first, lowers the instrument to D (or less commonly, E♭) and provides the low B_{1}. The second valve can be dependent, where it serves to lower the F attachment to D and has no effect alone. More commonly the second valve is independent, where it can be engaged separately to lower the instrument to G♭, or to D when both are engaged.

Single-valve B♭ bass trombones with an F attachment are still made but are now less common than two-valve bass trombones. The single valved B♭ bass trombones are essentially very large bore tenor trombones, and likewise are unable to provide the low B♮_{1} without lowering the valve to E with a long tuning slide.

Contrabass
Contrabass trombones in F typically have two independent valves, tuned either to C and D♭ combining to A, or in European models tuned to D and B♭ combining to A♭. Contrabass trombones in low B♭ usually have only one valve in F, although Miraphone make a model in C with two independent valves in G and A♭, which combine to E.

==== Valve types ====
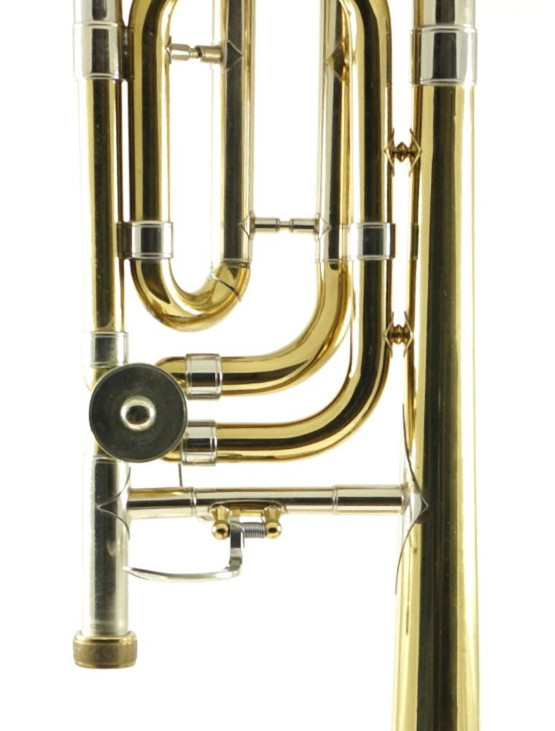
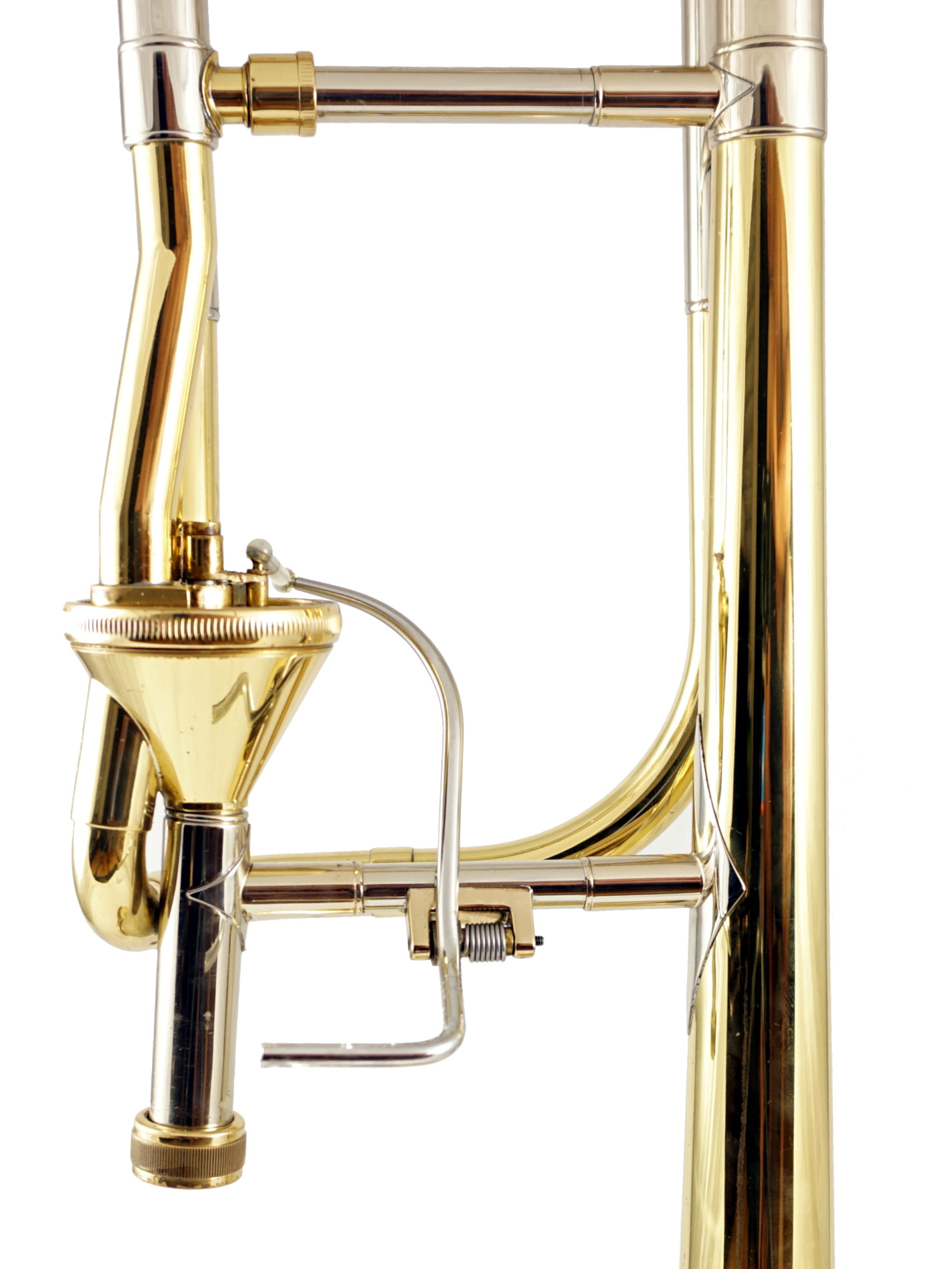
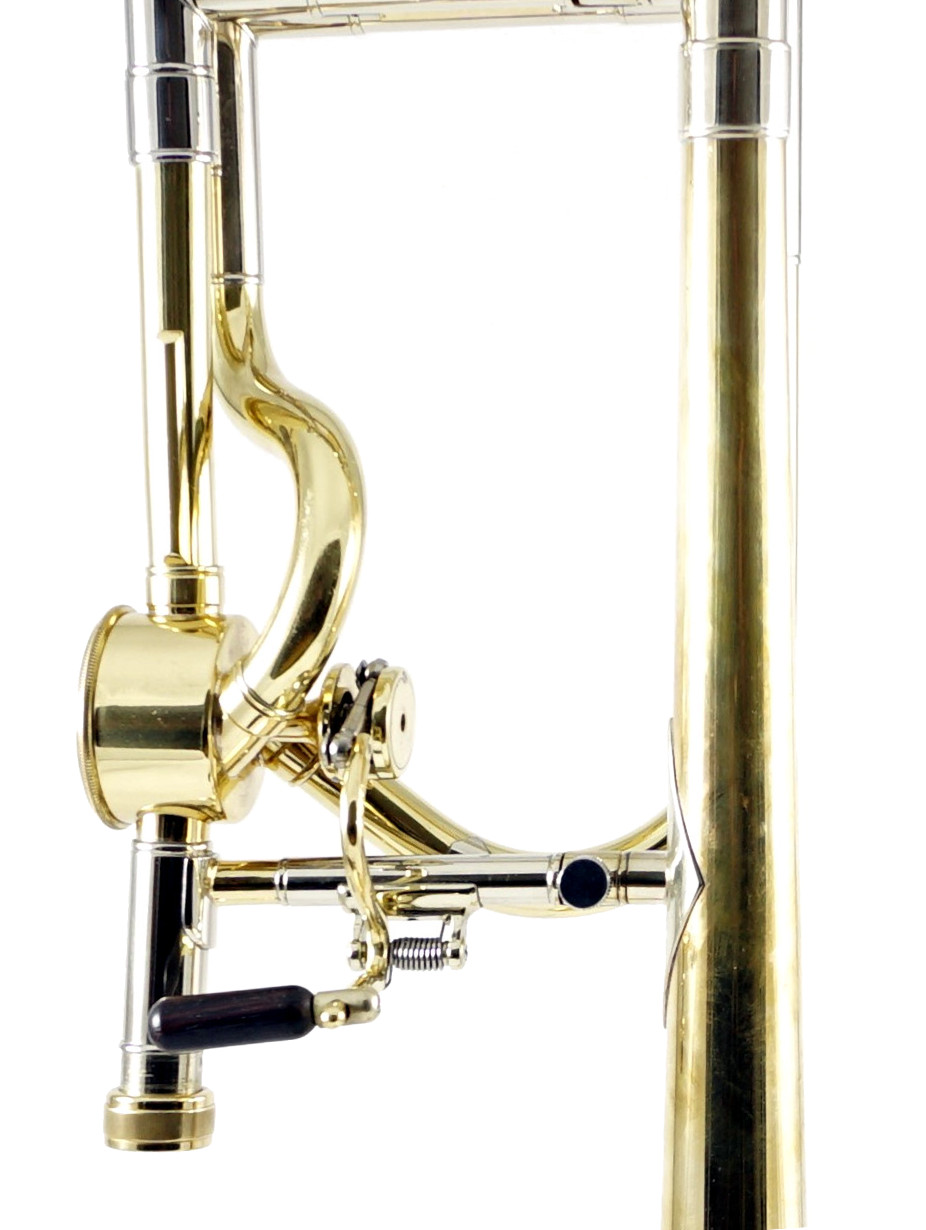
Trombone valve attachments. Standard rotary valve, left; Thayer axial flow valve, center; Hagmann valve, right.

The most common type of valve seen for valve attachments is a rotary valve. Since the mid 20th century there have been improvements to the rotary valve, and new valve designs. The tight bends in the conventional rotary valve create resistance in the instrument, which is much less of an issue with the newer valve designs. They have been widely adopted by players, especially in symphony orchestras. The Thayer axial flow valve is widely available, and the Hagmann valve is available mostly from European manufacturers.

The valves on a valve trombone serve a different function, replacing the slide with three valves. They may be piston valves or rotary valves, and are arranged the same as on other valved brass instruments.

==== Tubing ====
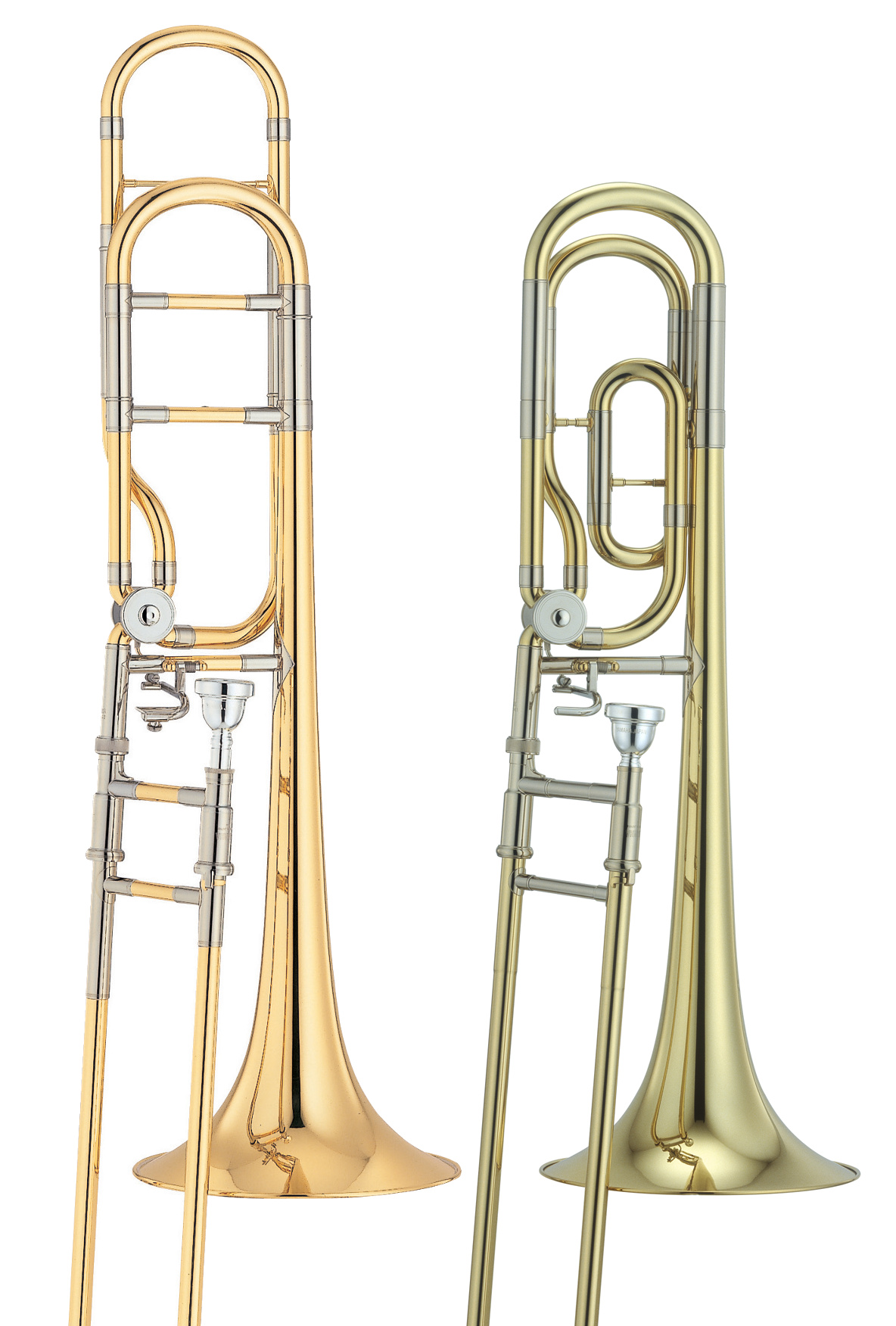
F attachment tubing: open wrap, left; traditional wrap, right.

F attachment tubing usually has a larger bore through the attachment than through the rest of the instrument. A typical slide bore for an orchestral tenor trombone is 0.547 in (13.9 mm) while the bore in the attachment is 0.562 in (14.3 mm). The attachment tubing also incorporates a tuning slide to tune the valve separately from the rest of the instrument, usually long enough to lower the pitch by a semitone when fully extended (from F to E on tenor and bass trombones, to reach the missing low B_{1}).

Valve attachment tubing is often coiled tightly to keep within the bell section (closed wrap or traditional wrap). A less coiled configuration, called open wrap, is found on some 19th and early 20th century instruments. In the early 1980s, American instrument manufacturers began producing open wrap instruments after Californian instrument technician Larry Minick introduced open wraps around the same time that the Thayer valve began to emerge among orchestral players. Open wrap F attachment tubing is shaped in a single loop free of tight bends, resulting in a freer response and more "open" sound through the valve.

=== Tuning ===
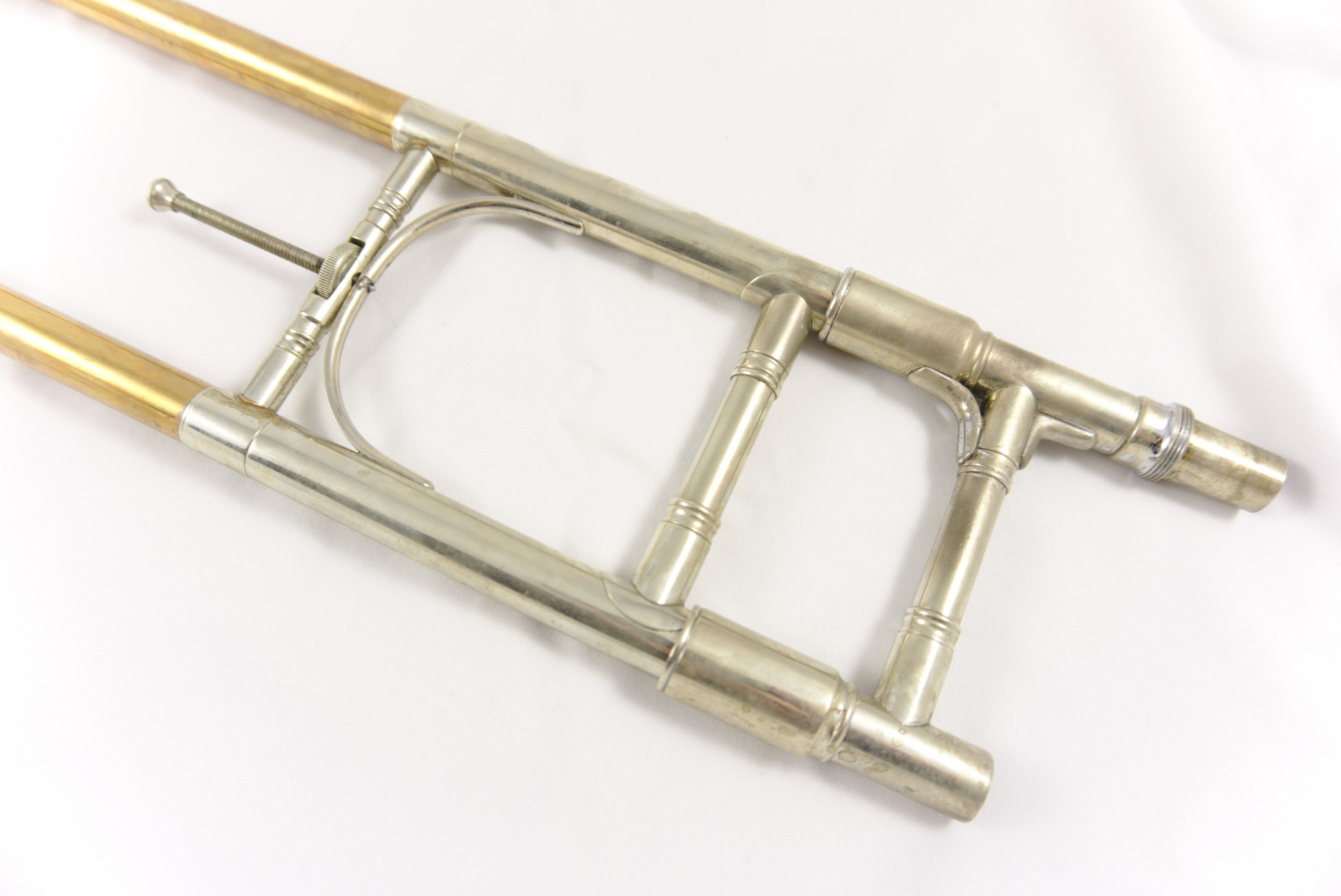
In-slide tuning on a Conn 70H bass trombone

The tuning slide is nearly always placed in the "U" of the bell section, but some trombones use a mechanism in the slide section instead. A tuning slide in the bell section requires two sections of cylindrical tubing in an otherwise conical part of the instrument, while placing the tuning mechanism in the slide section (which is already cylindrical) allows the bell section to remain conical.

=== Slides ===
Common and popular bore sizes for trombone slides are 0.500, 0.508, 0.525 and 0.547 in (12.7, 12.9, 13.3 and 13.9 mm) for tenor trombones, and 0.562 in (14.3 mm) for bass trombones. The slide may also be built with a dual-bore configuration, in which the bore of the second leg of the slide is slightly larger than the bore of the first leg, producing a stepwise conical effect. The most common dual-bore combinations are 0.481–0.491 in (12.2–12.5 mm), 0.500–0.508 in (12.7–12.9 mm), 0.508–0.525 in (12.9–13.3 mm), 0.525–0.547 in (13.3–13.9 mm), 0.547–0.562 in (13.9–14.3 mm) for tenor trombones, and 0.562–0.578 in (14.3–14.7 mm) for bass trombones.

=== Mouthpiece ===
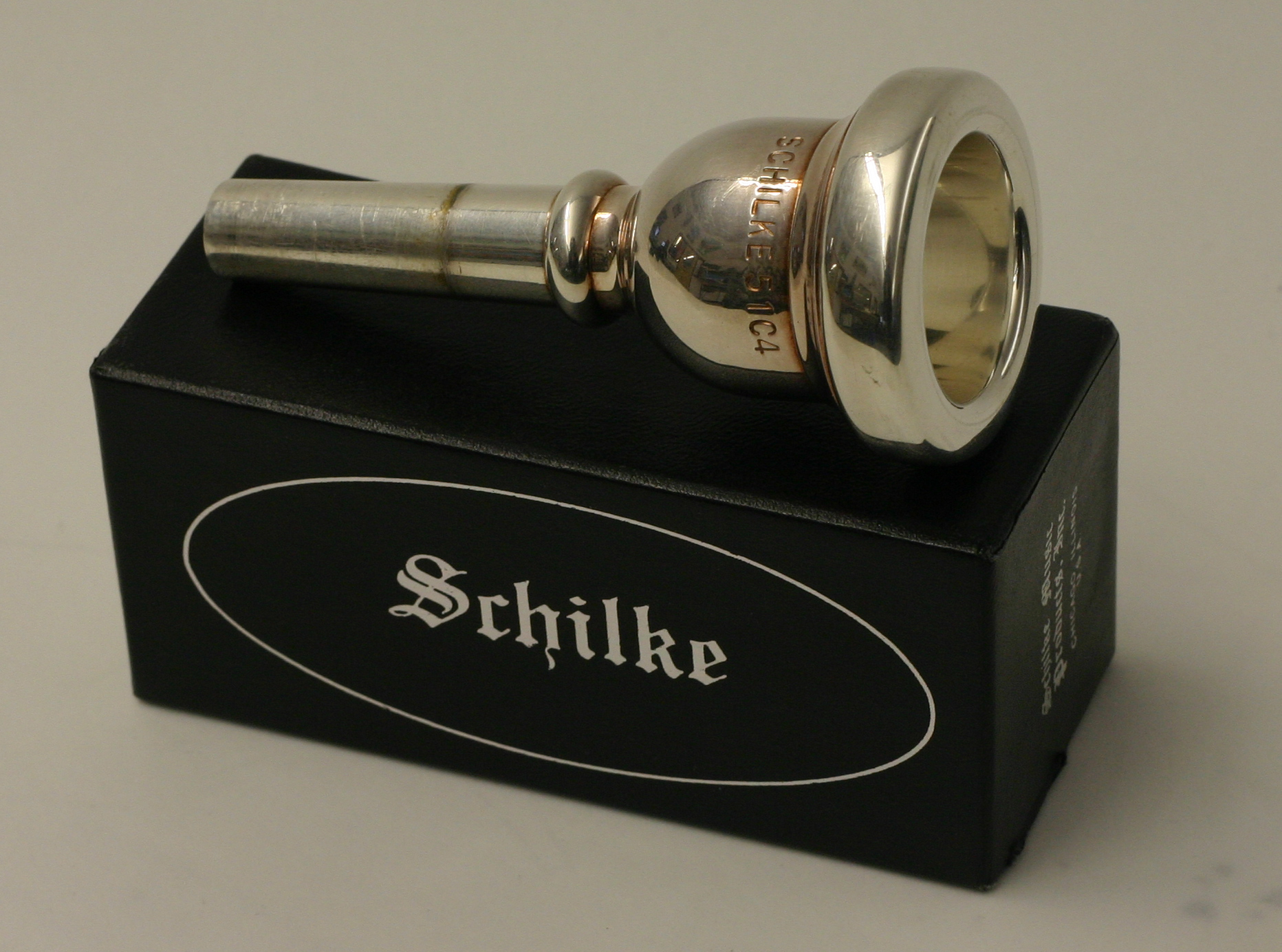
A tenor trombone mouthpiece

The mouthpiece is not part of the main body of the trombone, but is a separate piece of equipment. Mouthpieces for all brass instruments can be made from several materials, but are typically made of plated brass. Their dimensions—length, diameter, rim shape, cup depth, throat entrance, venturi aperture, venturi profile, and outside design—can vary greatly. Variations in mouthpiece construction affect playing ease, timbre, volume, intonation tendencies, and the instrument's playability in certain pitch ranges. Some mouthpiece makers now offer mouthpieces that feature separate rims, cups, and shanks, allowing players to customize to their preference.

=== Plastic ===
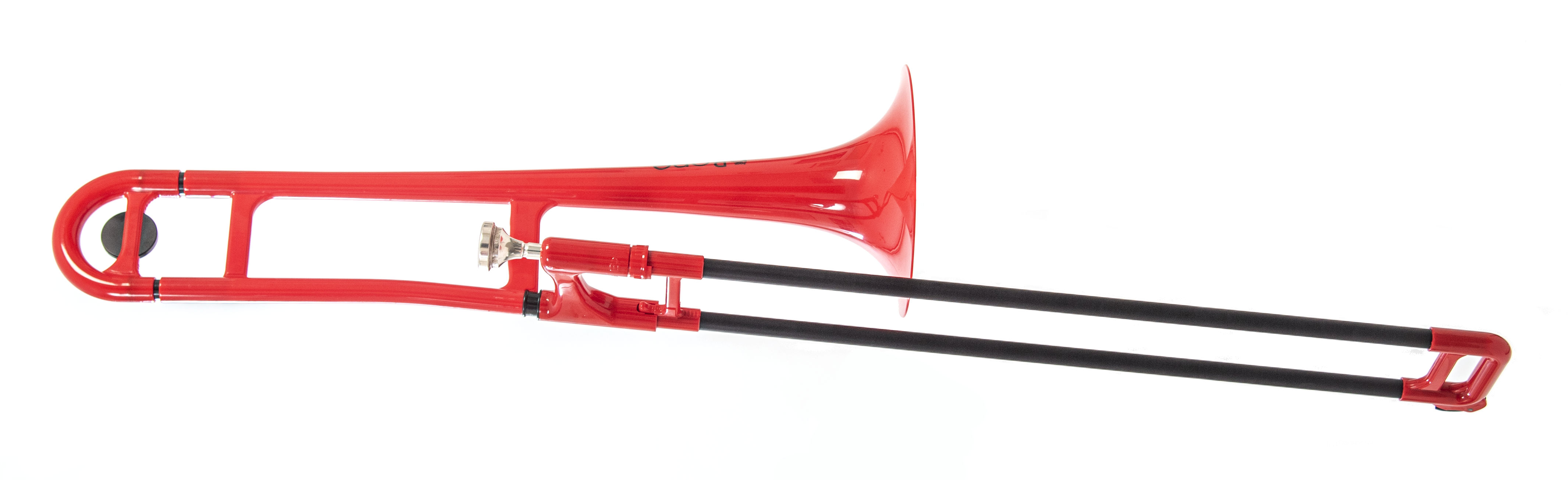
Trombone "pBone" made from ABS plastic

Trombones made mostly from plastic, including the pBone and the Tromba plastic trombone, emerged in the 2010s as an inexpensive and durable alternative to brass instruments. These instruments have found popularity as practice tools, travel instruments, or as a low-cost option for beginners. Large-bore models with triggers and alto trombones are now available.

=== Regional variations ===
==== Germany and Austria ====
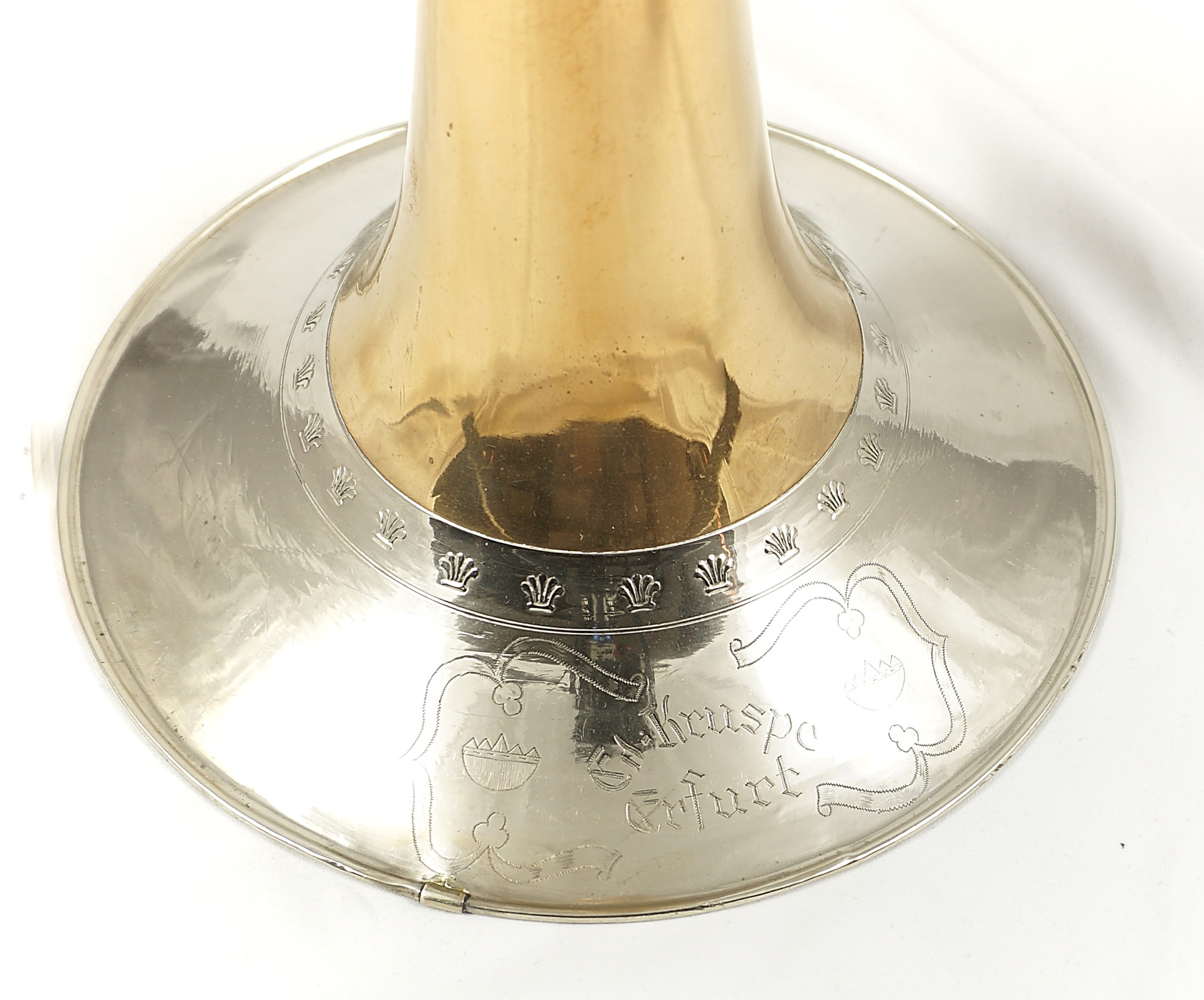
Kruspe Virtuosa tenor trombone bell with Kranz (wreath)

German trombones have been built in a wide variety of bore and bell sizes. The traditional German Konzertposaune can differ substantially from American designs in many aspects. The mouthpiece is typically rather small and is placed into a slide section with a very long leadpipe of at least 12 to 24 inches (30–60 cm). The whole instrument is typically made of gold brass. They are constructed using very thin metal (especially in the bell section), and many have a metal ring called a Kranz (lit. 'wreath') on the rim of the bell. Their sound is very even across dynamic levels but it can be difficult to play at louder volumes. While their bore sizes were considered large in the 19th century, German trombones have altered very little over the last 150 years and are now typically somewhat smaller than their American counterparts. Bell sizes remain very large in all sizes of German trombone and a bass trombone bell may exceed 10 inches (25 cm) in diameter.

Valve attachments in tenor and bass trombones were first seen in the mid 19th century, originally on the tenor B♭ trombone. Before 1850, bass trombone parts were mostly played on a slightly longer F-bass trombone (a fourth lower). The first valve was simply a fourth-valve, or in German "Quart-Ventil", built onto a B♭ tenor trombone, to allow playing in low F. This valve was first built without a return spring, and was only intended to set the instrument in B♭ or F for extended passages. Since the mid-20th century, modern instruments use a trigger to engage the valve while playing.

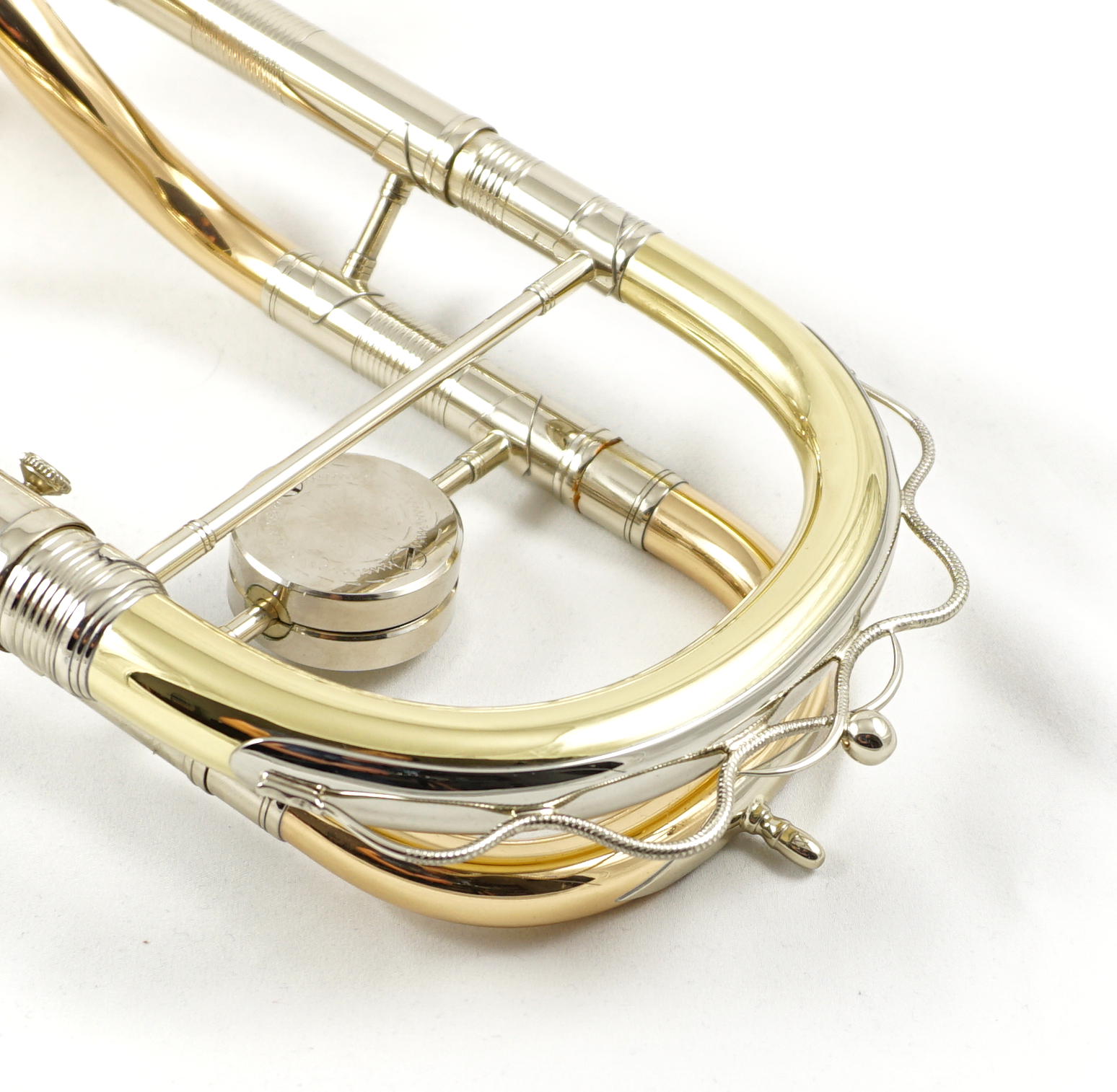
Tuning slide of a trombone with a traditional Schlangenverzierungen snake ornament, by Thein Brass

As with other traditional German and Austrian brass instruments, rotary valves are used to the exclusion of almost all other types of valve, even in valve trombones. Other features often found on German trombones include long water keys as well as Schlangenverzierungen (snake decorations) on the slide and bell U-bows to help protect the tubing from damage.

Since around 1925, when jazz music became popular, Germany has been selling "American trombones" as well. Most trombones made and/or played in Germany today, especially by amateurs, are built in the American fashion, as those are much more widely available, and thus far cheaper. However, some higher-end manufacturers such as Thein make modern iterations of the classic German Konzertposaune, as well as American-style trombones with German features like the Kranz and snake decorations.

==== France ====
French trombones were built in the very smallest bore sizes up to the end of the Second World War and whilst other sizes were made there, the French usually preferred the tenor trombone to any other size. French music usually employed a section of three tenor trombones up to the mid–20th century. Tenor trombones produced in France during the 19th and early 20th centuries featured bore sizes of around 0.450 in (11.4 mm), small bells of not more than 6 in (15 cm) in diameter, as well as a funnel-shaped mouthpiece slightly larger than that of the cornet or horn. French tenor trombones were built in both C and B♭, altos in D♭, sopranos in F, piccolos in B♭, basses in G and E♭, and contrabasses in B♭.

== Types ==
The most frequently encountered types of trombone today are the tenor and bass, though as with many other instrument families such as the clarinet, the trombone has been built in sizes from piccolo to contrabass. Although trombones are usually constructed with a slide to change the pitch, valve trombones instead use the set of three valves common on other brass instruments.

=== Slide trombones ===
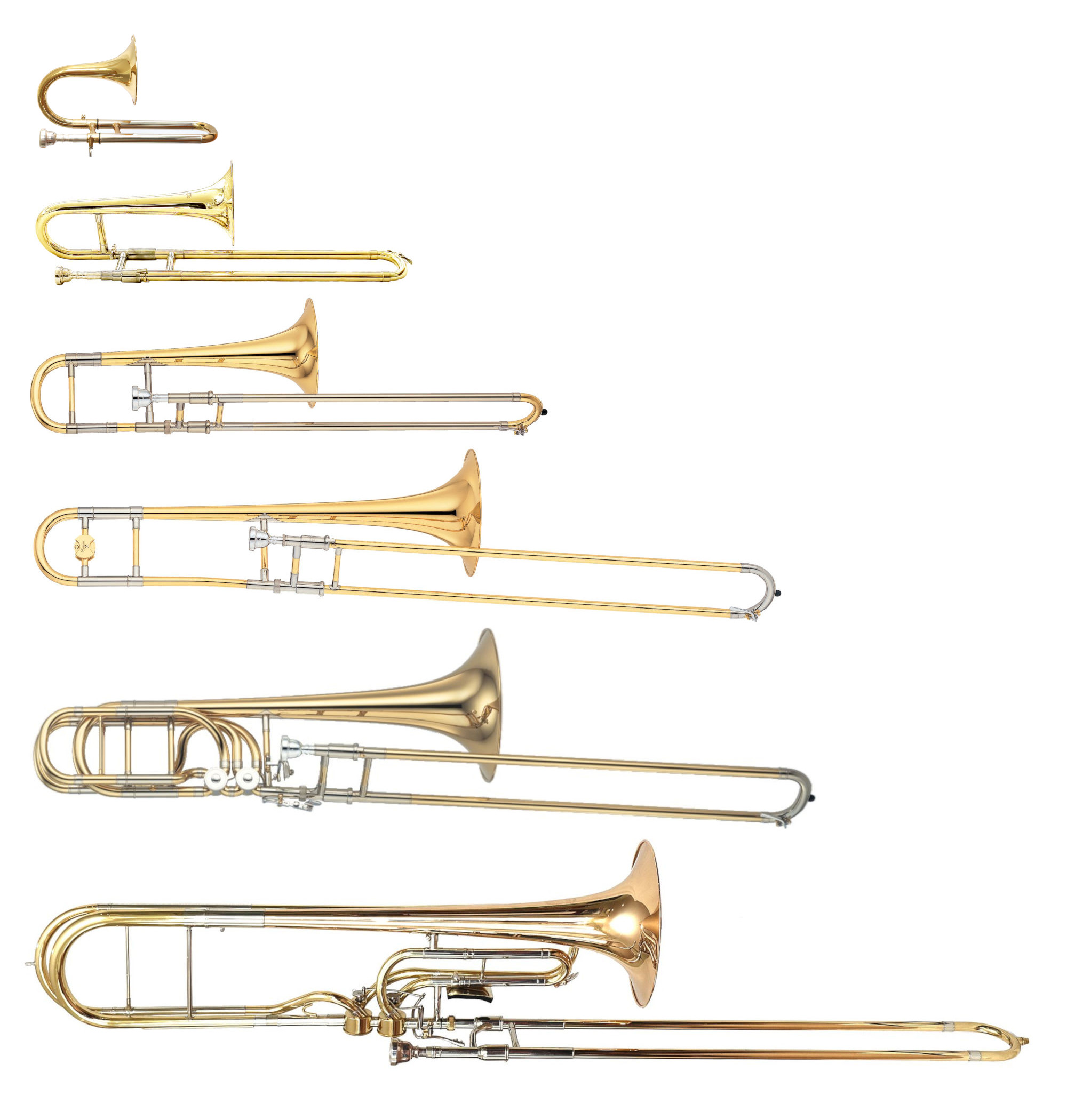
Trombones (top to bottom): piccolo in B♭, soprano in B♭, alto in E♭, tenor in B♭, bass in B♭ with F and G♭ valves, contrabass in F with D and B♭ valves.

==== Contrabass trombone ====
The contrabass trombone is the lowest trombone, first appearing in BB♭ an octave below the tenor with a double slide. This design was commissioned by Wagner in the 1870s for his Der Ring des Nibelungen opera cycle. Since the late 20th century however, it has largely been supplanted by a less cumbersome single-slide bass-contrabass instrument pitched in 12' F. With two valve attachments to provide the same full range as its predecessor, this design is effectively a modern bass trombone built down a perfect fourth. Although the contrabass has only appeared occasionally in orchestral repertoire and is not a permanent member of the modern orchestra, it has enjoyed a revival in the 21st century, particularly in film and video game soundtracks.

==== Bass trombone ====
Although early instruments were pitched in G, F or E♭ below the tenor trombone, the modern bass trombone is pitched in the same B♭ as the tenor but with a wider bore, a larger bell, and a larger mouthpiece. These features facilitate playing in the lower register of the instrument. Modern bass trombones have valves that allow a fully chromatic range down to the pedal register (B♭_{1}). In Britain, the bass trombone in G was used in orchestras from the mid-19th century and survived into the 1950s, particularly in British brass bands.

==== Tenor trombone ====
The tenor trombone has a fundamental note of B♭ and is usually treated as a non-transposing instrument (see below). Tenor trombones with C as their fundamental note were almost equally popular in the mid-19th century in Britain and France. As the trombone in its simplest form has neither crooks, valves nor keys to lower the pitch by a specific interval, trombonists use seven chromatic slide positions. Each position progressively increases the length of the air column, thus lowering the pitch.

Extending the slide from one position to the next lowers the pitch by one semitone. Thus, each note in the harmonic series can be lowered by an interval of up to a tritone. The lowest note of the standard instrument is therefore an E♮ – a tritone below B♭. Most experienced trombonists can play lower "falset" notes and much lower pedal notes (first partials or fundamentals, which have a peculiar metallic rumbling sound). Slide positions are subject to adjustment, compensating for imperfections in the tuning of different harmonics. The fifth partial is rather flat on most trombones and usually requires a minute shortening of the slide position to compensate; other small adjustments are also normally required throughout the range. Trombonists make frequent use of alternate positions to minimize slide movement in rapid passages; for instance, B♭_{3} may be played in first or fifth position. Alternate positions are also needed to allow a player to produce a glissando to or from a higher note on the same partial.

While the lowest note of the tenor trombone's range (excluding fundamentals or pedal notes) is E_{2}, the trombone's upper range is theoretically open-ended. The practical top of the range is sometimes considered to be F_{5}, or more conservatively D_{5}. The range of the C tenor trombone is F♯_{2} to G_{5}.

==== Alto trombone ====
The alto trombone is smaller than the tenor trombone and almost always pitched in E♭ a fourth higher than the tenor, although examples pitched in F are occasionally found. Modern instruments are sometimes fitted with a valve to lower the pitch, either by a semitone to D (known as a "trill" valve), or by a fourth into B♭. The alto trombone was commonly used in the 16th to the 18th centuries in church music to strengthen the alto voice, particularly in the Mass. Early 19th century composers such as Beethoven, Brahms, and Schumann began writing for alto trombone in their symphonies, but the subsequent use and popularity of tenor trombones in the orchestra largely eclipsed their use until a modern revival that began in the late 20th century.

==== Soprano trombone ====
The soprano trombone is usually pitched in B♭ an octave above the tenor, and has seldom been used since its first known appearance in 1677 outside of trombone choirs in Moravian Church music. Built with mouthpiece, bore and bell dimensions similar to the B♭ trumpet, it tends to be played by trumpet players. During the 20th century some soprano trombones—dubbed slide cornets—were made as novelties or for use by jazz players including Louis Armstrong and Dizzy Gillespie. A small number of contemporary proponents of the instrument include jazz artists Wycliffe Gordon and Christian Scott, and classical trumpeter Torbjörn Hultmark, who advocates for its use as an instrument for young children to learn music.

==== Sopranino and piccolo trombones ====
The sopranino and piccolo trombones appeared in the 1950s as novelty instruments, and are even smaller and higher than the soprano. They are pitched in high E♭ and B♭ respectively, one octave above the alto and soprano trombones. Owing to being essentially a slide variant of the piccolo trumpet, they are played primarily by trumpet players.

=== Trombones with valves ===
==== Valve trombone ====
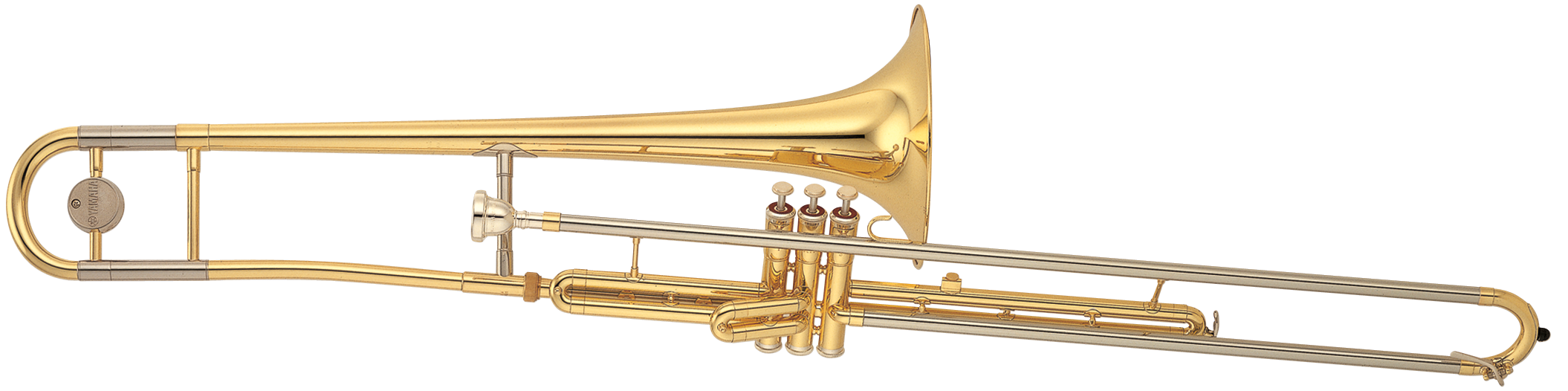
Valve (tenor) trombone in B♭

In the 19th century as soon as brass instrument valves were invented, trombones with valves instead of slides were adopted widely in orchestras, and remain popular in some parts of Europe and in military bands.

==== Cimbasso ====
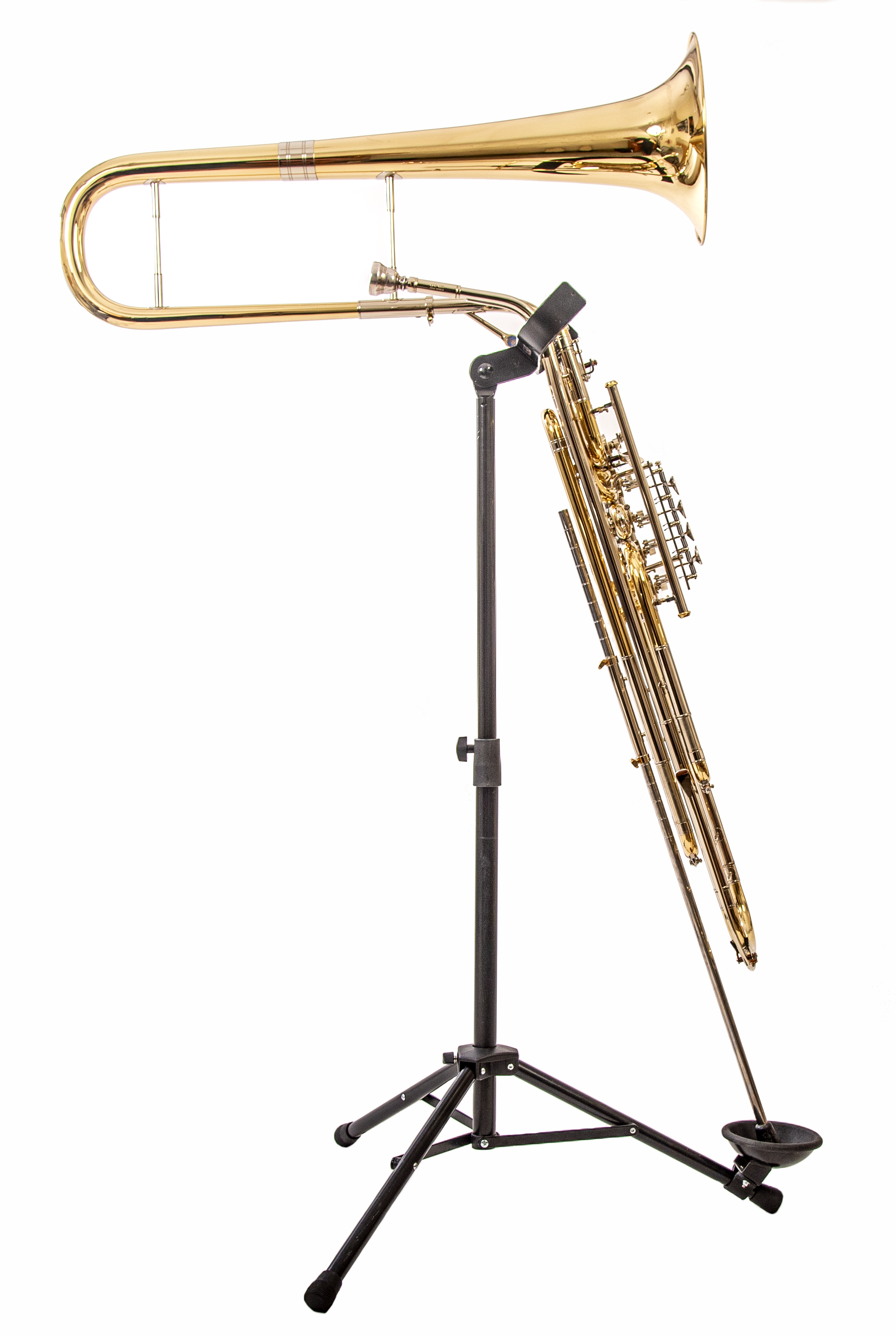
A modern cimbasso in F

The cimbasso covers the same range as a tuba or a contrabass trombone. The term cimbasso first appeared in early 19th century Italian opera scores, and originally referred to an upright serpent or an ophicleide. The modern cimbasso first appeared as the trombone basso Verdi in the 1880s and has three to six piston valves or rotary valves and a predominantly cylindrical bore. They are most often pitched in 12' F, although models are available in E♭ and occasionally 16' C and 18' B♭. The cimbasso is most commonly used in performances of late Romantic Italian operas by Verdi and Puccini, but has also experienced a 21st-century revival in film, television and video game soundtracks.

==== Superbone ====
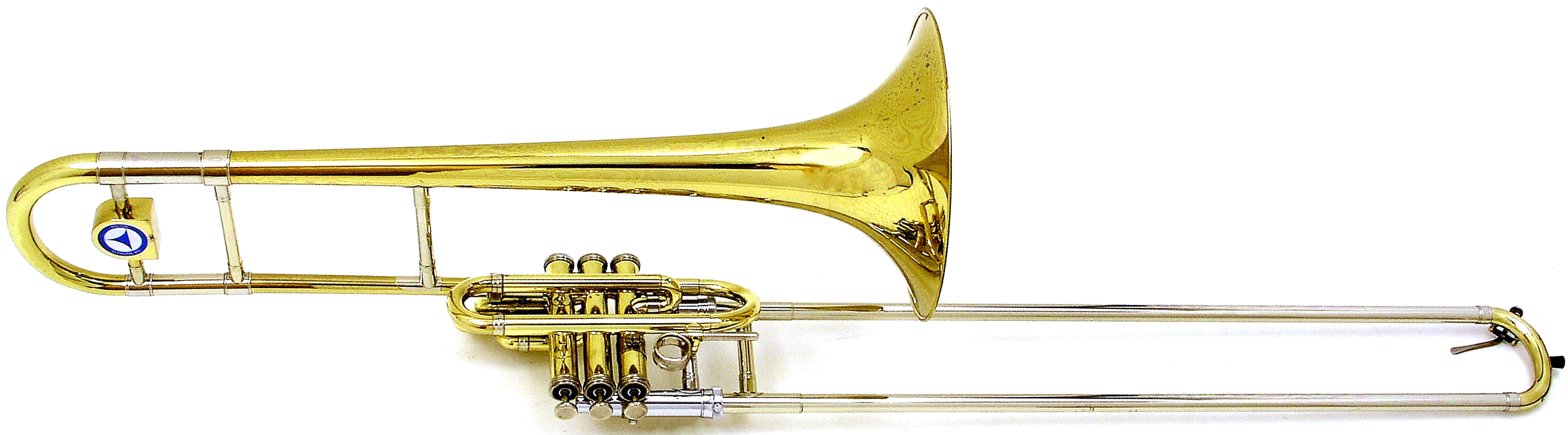
Holton TR-395 Superbone

A hybrid, "duplex" or "double" trombone is a design of trombone that has both a slide and a set of three valves for altering the pitch. It has been reinvented several times since first appearing in the 19th century by Besson, and later Conn. Jazz trombonist and machinist Brad Gowans invented his "valide trombone" in the 1940s with a short four-position slide. In the 1970s Maynard Ferguson and Holton produced the "Superbone", very similar to the earlier Conn. In 2013 Schagerl in collaboration with James Morrison announced a larger bore variant with rotary valves.

==== Flugabone ====
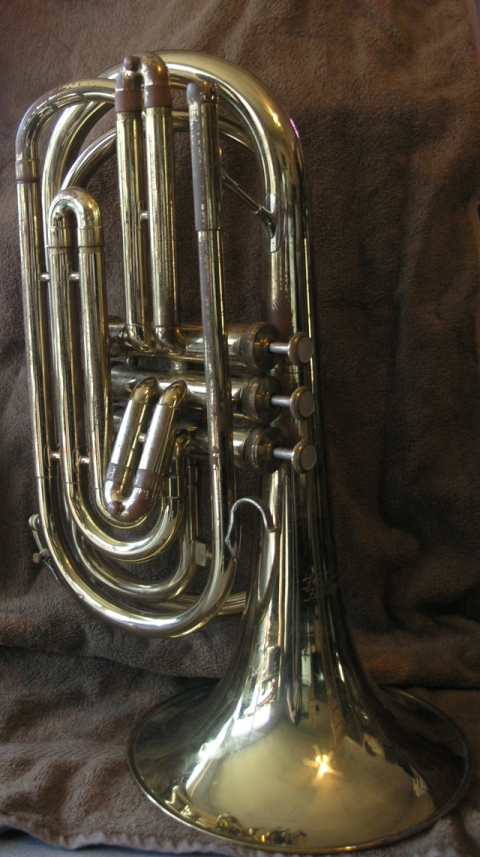
Flugabone in B♭ by Olds

The "flugabone" (or sometimes "flugelbone"), portmanteau of "flugelhorn" and "trombone", also known as the "marching trombone", is a marching brass instrument, essentially a valve trombone wrapped into a compact flugelhorn shape. It retains the cylindrical bore of the trombone, rather than the conical bore of either the flugelhorn or bugle, and thus is similar in playing characteristics to a valve trombone. A similar marching trombone is the "trombonium" first produced by King Musical Instruments, wrapped and held vertically like a euphonium.

=== Other variants ===
==== Sackbut ====
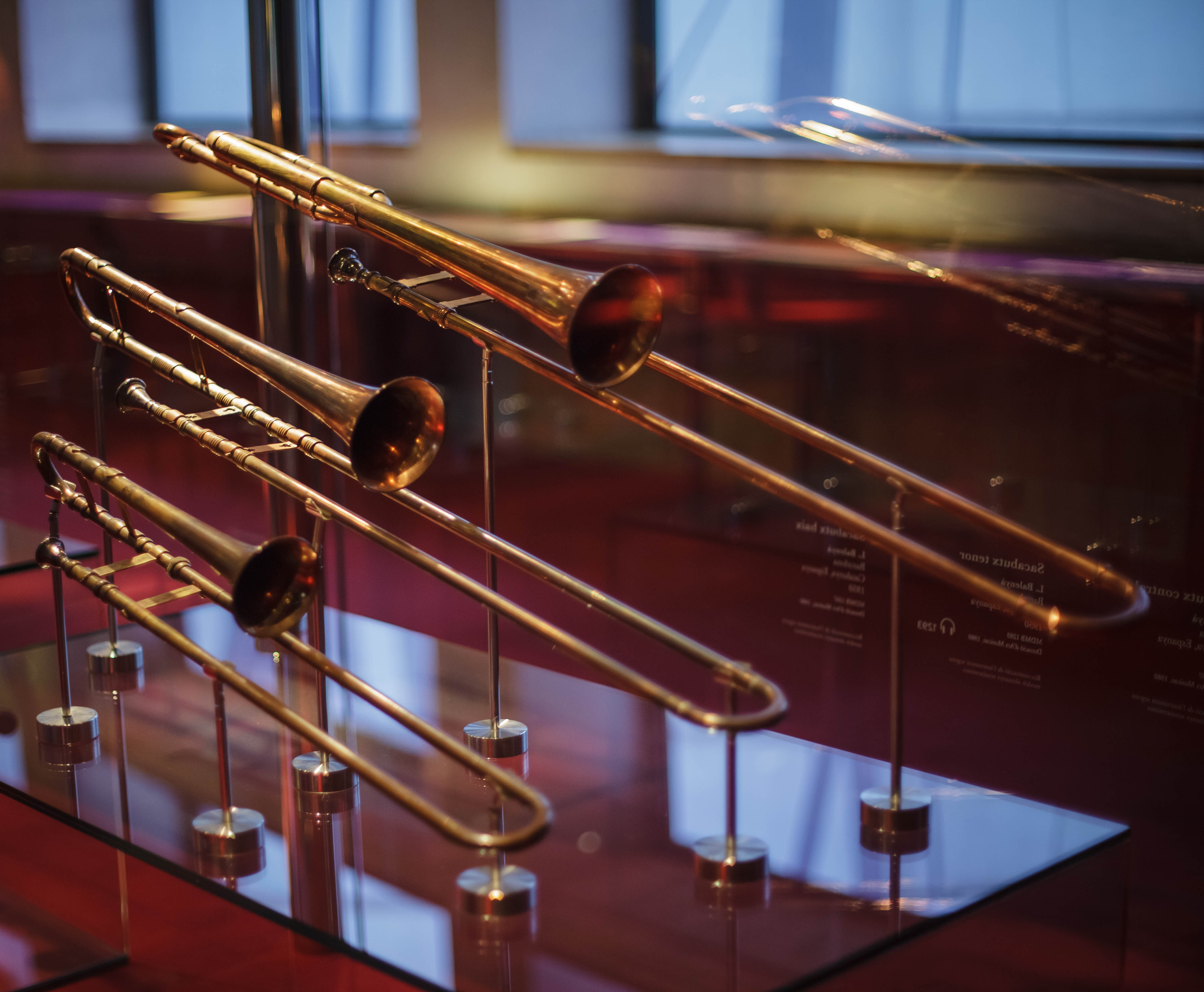
Alto, tenor and bass sackbuts, Museu de la Música de Barcelona

The term "sackbut" refers to the early forms of the trombone commonly used during the Renaissance and Baroque eras, with a characteristically smaller, more cylindrically proportioned bore, and a less-flared bell.

==== Buccin ====
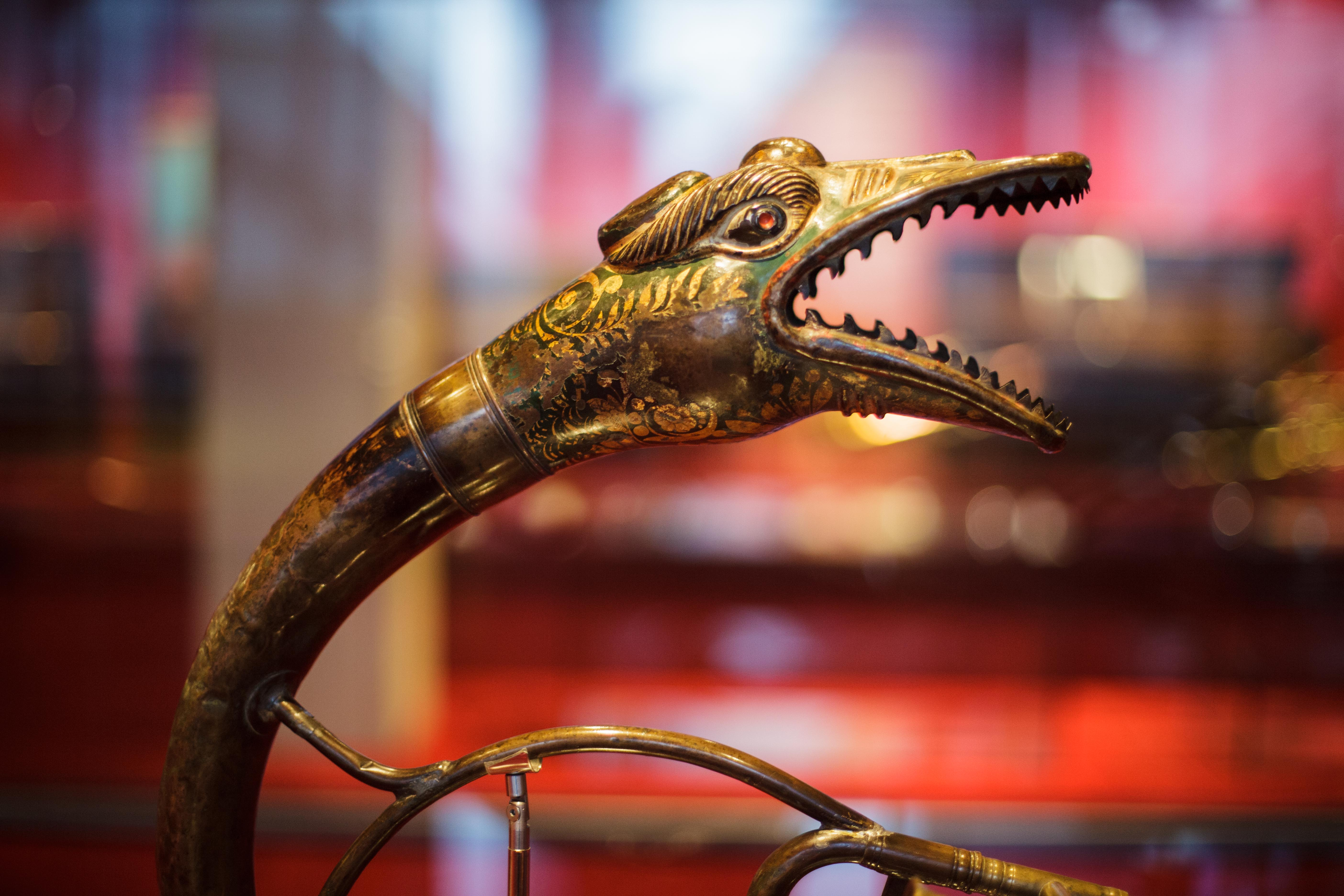
Bell of a buccin, Museu de la Música de Barcelona

A distinctive form of tenor trombone was popularized in France in the early 19th century. Called the buccin, it featured a tenor trombone slide and a bell that ended in a zoomorphic (serpent or dragon) head. It sounds like a cross between a trombone and a French horn, with a very wide dynamic range but a limited and variable range of pitch. Hector Berlioz wrote for the buccin in his Messe solennelle of 1824.

==== Tromboon ====
A portmanteau of "trombone" and "bassoon", the "tromboon" was created by musical parodist Peter Schickele by replacing a trombone's mouthpiece with the reed and bocal of a bassoon. It appears in several humorous works of Schickele's fictional composer, P. D. Q. Bach.

== Technique ==
=== Basic slide positions ===
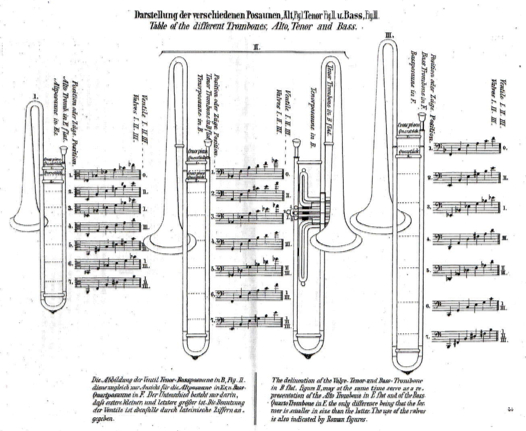
Slide position chart (new system); most trombones are tenor trombones, like the valveless one in the middle.

The modern system defines seven chromatic slide positions on a tenor trombone in B♭. It was first described by Andre Braun circa 1795.

In 1811 Joseph Fröhlich wrote on the differences between the modern system and an old system where four diatonic slide positions were used and the trombone was pitched in A. The chart below compares the two systems (in the old system, the contemporary 1st position was called "drawn past", and 2nd position was the modern 1st position). In the modern system, moving the slide outward approximately 3 1/4 inches [8 cm] lowers the pitch by one semitone when playing in the same partial.

New system	1	2	3	4	5	6	7
Old system	–	1	–	2	–	3	4

=== Partials and intonation ===
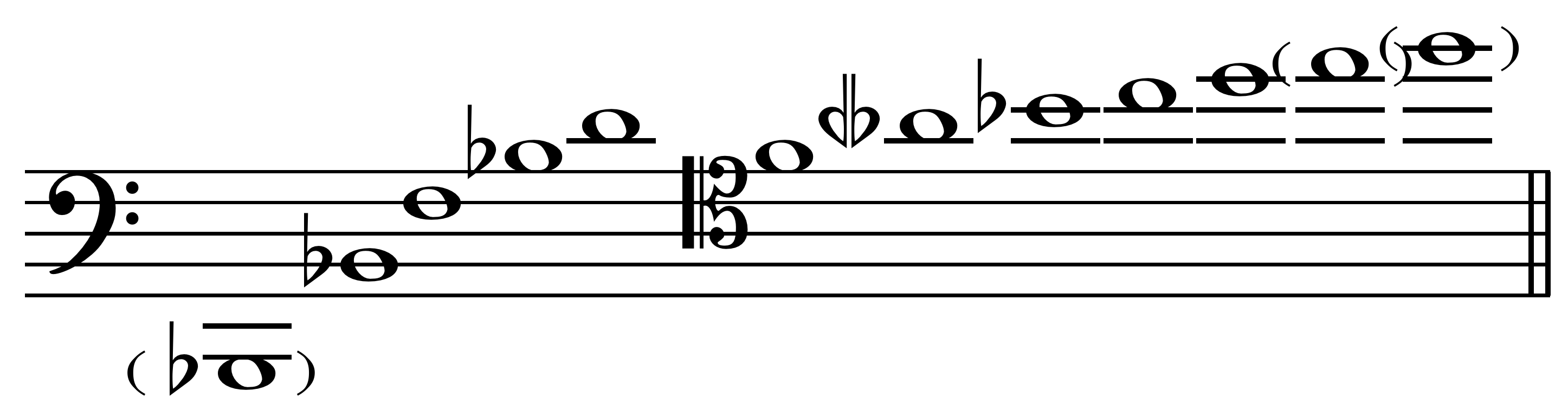
Trombone first position harmonic series, "where additional overtones may be used to stretch the upper range a bit higher."

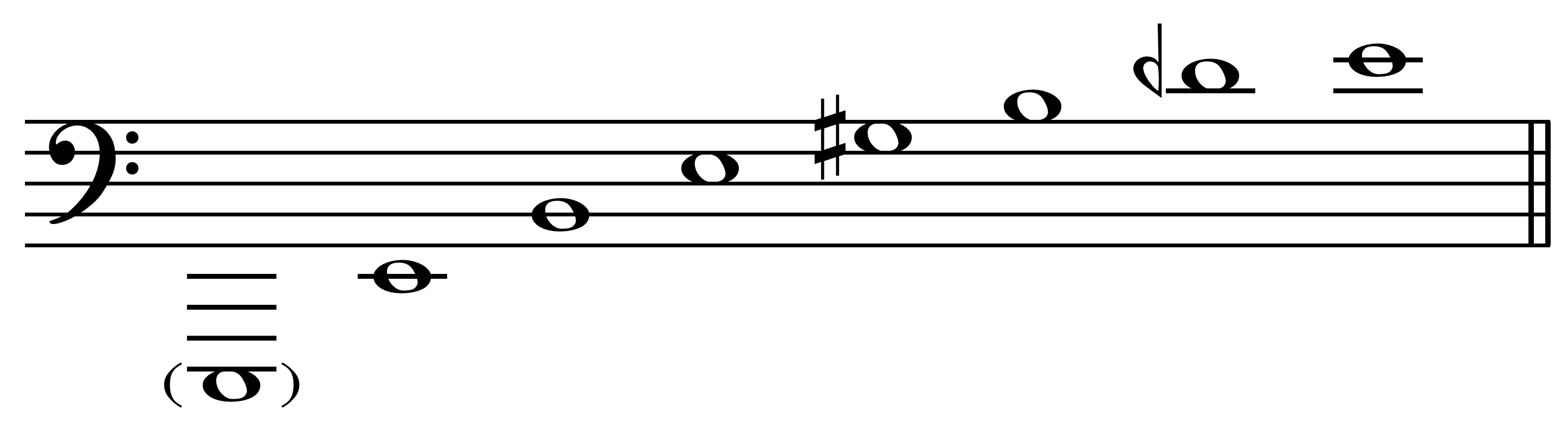
Trombone seventh position harmonic series.

As with all brass instruments, progressive tightening of the lips and increased air pressure allow the player to move to different partial in the harmonic series. In first position on a B♭ trombone, the notes in the harmonic series begin with B♭_{2} (one octave higher than the pedal B♭_{1}), F_{3} (a perfect fifth higher than the previous partial), B♭_{3} (a perfect fourth higher), D_{4} (a major third higher), and F_{4} (a minor third higher).

F_{4} is the sixth partial, or the fifth overtone. The next partial (in first position this is A♭_{4}, a minor third higher than F_{4}) tends to be out of tune. In the standard tuning system this A♭_{4} is generally 31 cents flat of the minor seventh. On the slide trombone, such tuning deviations are corrected for by slightly adjusting the slide or by using an alternate position. Although Western music has adopted the even-tempered scale, it has been the practice in Germany and Austria to play these notes in position, where they will have just intonation (see harmonic seventh as well for A♭_{4}).

The next higher partials—B♭_{4} (a major second higher), C_{5} (a major second higher), D_{5} (a major second higher)—do not require much adjustment for even-tempered intonation, but the eleventh partial at E♭_{5} (a minor second higher) is almost exactly a quarter tone higher than the corresponding note would be in twelve-tone equal temperament. E♭_{5} and F_{5} (a major second higher) at the next partial are very high notes; a proficient player with a highly developed facial musculature and diaphragm can go even higher to G_{5}, A♭_{5}, B♭_{5} and beyond.

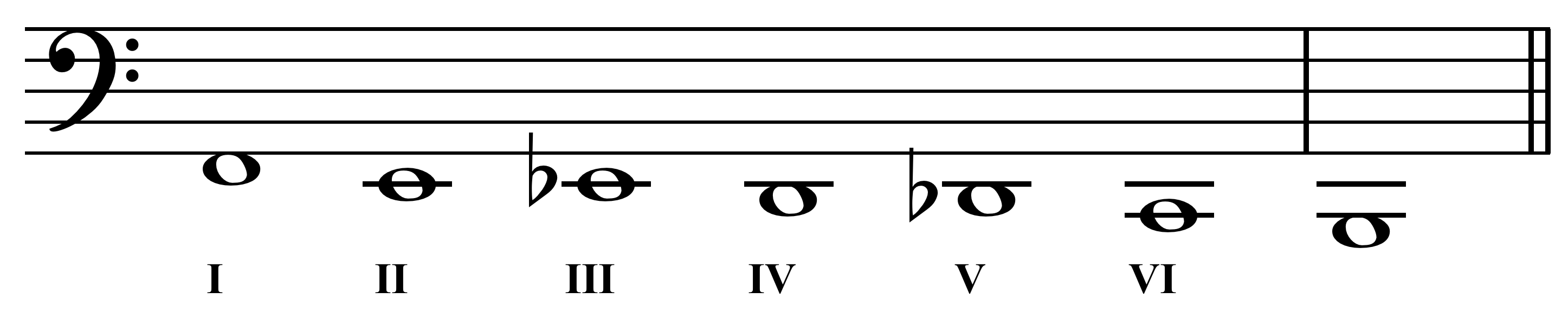
Trombone with F attachment slide position second harmonics.

As notes get higher in the harmonic series they get closer together. One result of this is that the higher range of the trombone requires less movement of the slide. In the lower range, notes may be several slide positions apart, (this is more exaggerated on lower pitched trombones) but for higher notes the player only needs the first four positions since the partials are closer together, and higher notes may be played in alternate positions. For example, F_{4} (the first F above the bass clef staff) may be played in first, fourth or sixth position. The note E_{1} (or the lowest E on a standard 88-key piano keyboard) is the lowest attainable note on a 9-foot (2.7 m) B♭ tenor trombone, requiring a full 7 feet 4 inches (2.24 m) of tubing. On trombones without an F attachment, there is a gap between B♭_{1} (the fundamental in first position) and E_{2} (the first harmonic in seventh position). Skilled players can produce "falset" notes between these, but the sound is relatively weak and not usually used in performance. The addition of an F attachment allows for intermediate notes to be played with more clarity.

=== Pedal tones ===
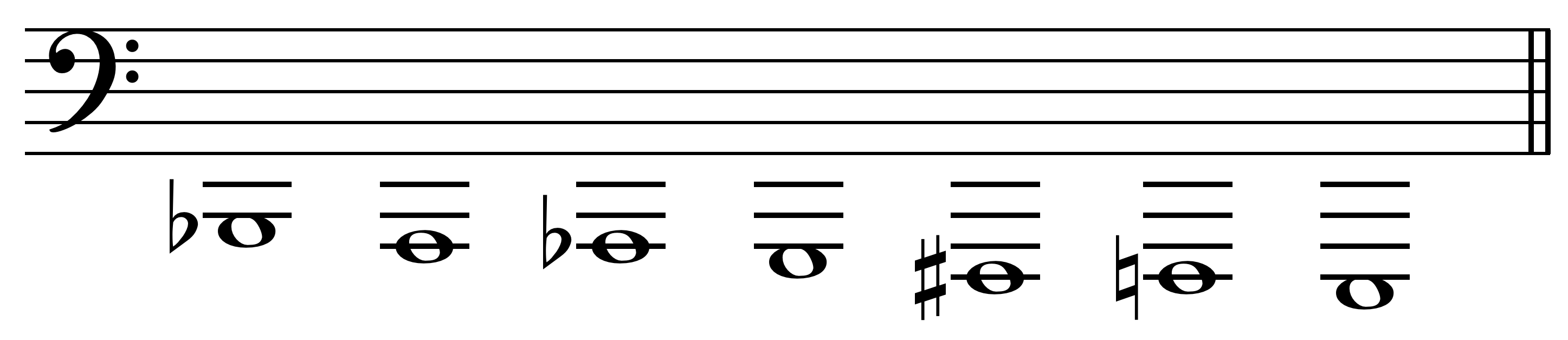
Trombone slide position "pedal tones".

The B♭ pedal tone is frequently seen in commercial scoring but much less often in symphonic music, while notes below that are called for only rarely as they "become increasingly difficult to produce and insecure in quality" with A♭ or G being the bottom limit for most tenor trombonists. The trombone's tubing is largely cylindrical, which inhibits the production of the fundamental as a pedal tone pitch. Instead, trombonists use the higher harmonics of the instrument to produce pedal tones, giving them a bright and hollow tone quality. Some contemporary orchestral writing, movie or video game scoring, trombone ensemble and solo works will call for notes as low as a pedal C, B, or even double pedal B♭ on the bass trombone.

=== Glissando ===
The trombone is one of the few wind instruments that can produce a true glissando, by moving the slide without interrupting the airflow or sound production. Every pitch in a glissando must have the same harmonic number, and a tritone is the largest interval that can be performed as a glissando. 'Harmonic', 'inverted', 'broken' or 'false' glissandos are those that cross one or more harmonic series, requiring a simulated or faked glissando effect.

=== Trills ===
Trills, though generally simple with valves, are difficult on the slide trombone. Trills tend to be easiest and most effective higher in the harmonic series because the distance between notes is much smaller and slide movement is minimal. For example, a trill on B♭_{3}/C_{4} is virtually impossible as the slide must move two positions (either 1st-to-3rd or 5th-to-3rd), however at an octave higher (B♭_{4}/C_{5}) the notes can both be achieved in 1st position as a lip trill. Thus, the most convincing trills tend to be above the first octave and a half of the tenor's range. Trills are most commonly found in early Baroque and Classical music for the trombone as a means of ornamentation although some more modern pieces will call for trills.

=== Notation ===
Unlike most other brass instruments in an orchestral setting, the trombone is not usually treated as a transposing instrument. Prior to the invention of brass instrument valves, most brass instruments were limited to playing one overtone series at a time. Altering the pitch of the instrument required manually replacing a section of tubing called a crook, or changing to an instrument of a different length. Their parts were transposed according to which crook or instrument pitch was desired at any given time, so that a particular note on the staff always corresponded to a particular partial on the instrument.

Trombones have used slides since their inception, so they have always been fully chromatic. This made it unnecessary to treat them as transposing instruments, and orchestral trombone parts have always been notated at concert pitch. Reading in concert pitch also meant trombones did not require dedicated parts to double choir parts. While the tubing length of the tenor trombone (slide fully retracted) has remained a fairly constant 9 feet (9′), the conceptual pitch of trombones has changed through history due to changing Pitch standards; a B♭ in modern A440 was a Baroque A.

Trombone music is typically notated in bass clef. Tenor clef is often used for high passages, but not usually in jazz charts. In orchestra scores, some composers wrote the entire first trombone part in alto clef, and the second part in tenor clef. As the alto trombone declined in popularity during the 19th century, this practice was gradually abandoned and trombone parts came to be notated in the tenor or bass clef. Some Russian and Eastern European composers wrote first and second tenor trombone parts on one alto clef staff (the German Robert Schumann was the first to do this). Scores by Igor Stravinsky, Sergei Prokofiev, and Dmitri Shostakovich commonly used this practice.

Trombone parts in concert band music are nearly exclusively notated in bass clef. In the British brass band, trombones are treated as B♭ transposing instruments, and read transposing B♭ treble clef, sounding a major ninth below written pitch (a written middle C₄ produces a concert B♭₂).

An accomplished performer today is expected to read parts notated in bass, tenor, and alto clefs, and (more rarely) treble clef in C and B♭.

=== Mutes ===
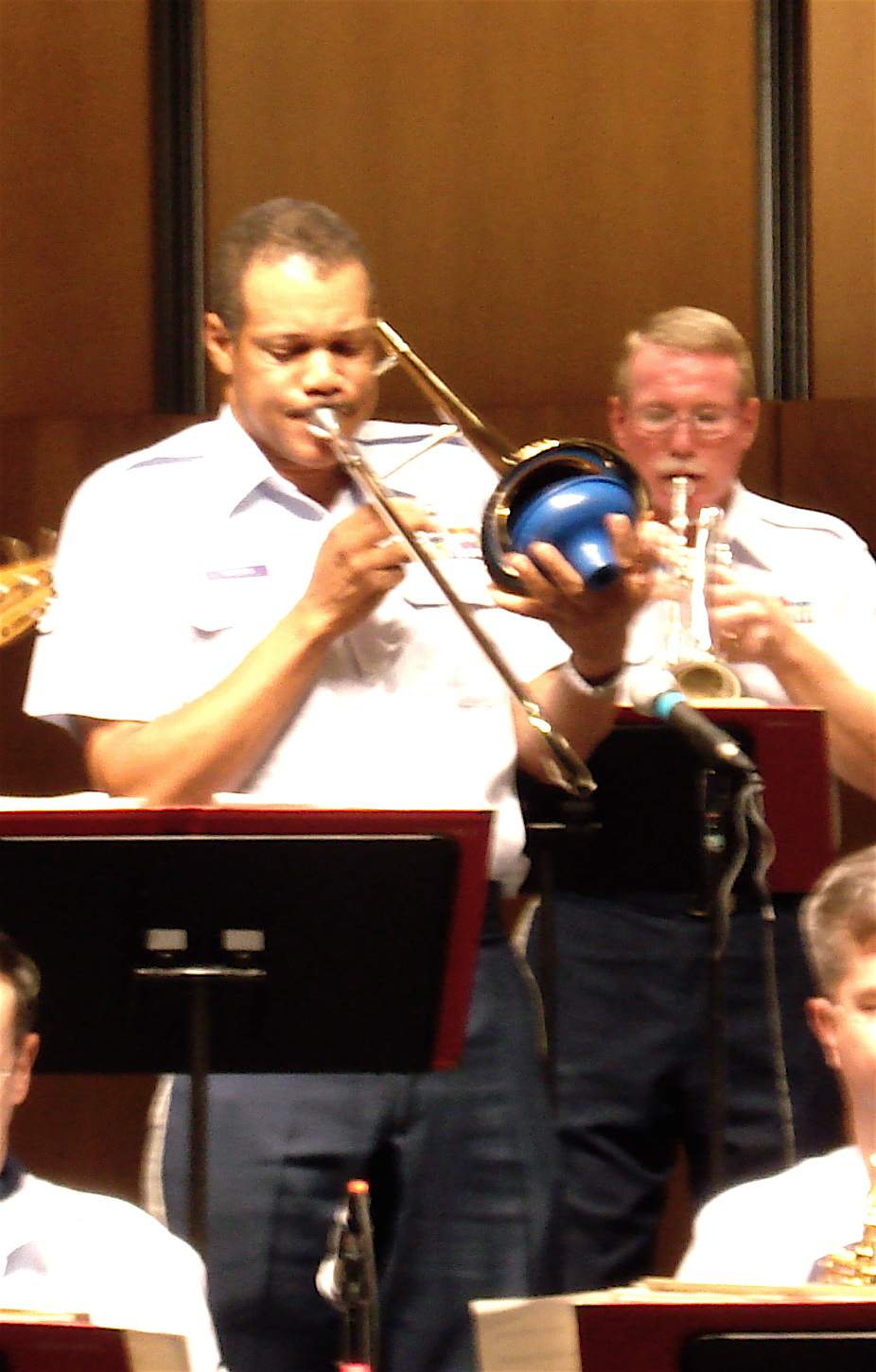
A plunger in use

A variety of mutes can be used with the trombone to alter its timbre. Many are held in place with the use of cork grips, including the straight, cup, harmon and pixie mutes. Some fit over the bell, like the bucket mute. In addition to this, mutes can be held in front of the bell and moved to cover more or less area for a wah-wah effect. Mutes used in this way include the "hat" (a metal mute shaped like a bowler hat) and plunger (which looks like, and often is, the rubber suction cup from a sink or toilet plunger). The "wah-wah" sound of a trombone with a harmon mute is featured as the voices of adults in the Peanuts cartoons.

== Didactics ==
Several makers have begun to market compact B♭/C trombones that are especially well suited for young children learning to play the trombone who cannot reach the outer slide positions of full-length instruments. The fundamental note of the unenhanced length is C, but the short attachment that puts the instrument in B♭ has its valve open when the trigger is not depressed. While such instruments have no seventh slide position, C and B natural may be comfortably accessed on the first and second positions by using the trigger. A similar design ("Preacher model") was marketed by C.G. Conn in the 1920s, also under the Wurlitzer label. Currently, B♭/C trombones are available from many manufacturers, including German makers Günter Frost, Thein and Helmut Voigt, as well as the Yamaha Corporation.

== Manufacturers ==
Trombones in slide and valve configuration have been made by a vast array of musical instrument manufacturers. For the brass bands of the late 19th and early 20th century, prominent American manufacturers included Graves and Sons, E. G. Wright and Company, Boston Musical Instrument Company, E. A. Couturier, H. N. White Company/King Musical Instruments, J. W. York, and C.G. Conn. In the 21st century, leading mainstream manufacturers of trombones include Bach, Conn, Courtois, Edwards, Getzen, Jupiter, King, Rath, Schilke, S.E. Shires, Thein, Wessex, Willson and Yamaha.

== See also ==
- Aequale – Composition for equal voices
- Shout band – Style of Gospel music
- Trombone repertoire – Set of available musical works for trombone
