= Gallowstreet =

Dutch brass band from Amsterdam

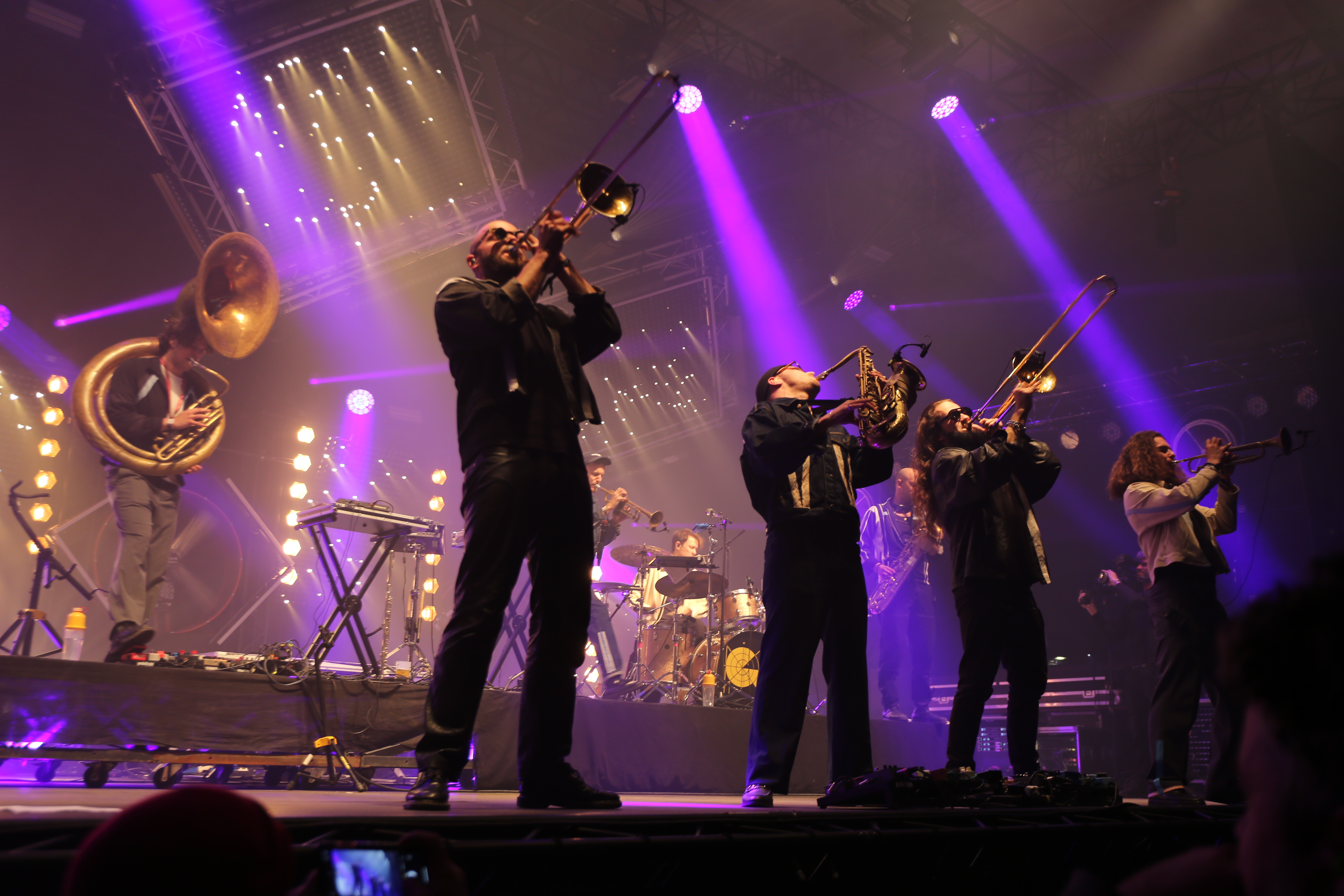
- Gallowstreet at Trans Musicales 2024 in Rennes, France

Background information
- Origin: Amsterdam, Netherlands
- Genres: Hip hop; Funk; Afrobeat
- Years active: 2012–present
- Labels: V2 Records Benelux; INI Movement; ZenneZ Records; Wicked Wax Amsterdam
- Members: Robin van Rhijn (drums); Peter Keijsers (sousaphone); Dirk Zandvliet (baritone saxophone); Lucas van Ee (tenor saxophone); Jeroen Verberne (trombone); Odei Al-Magut (trombone); Dima Loginov (trumpet); Luc Janssens (trumpet)
- Past members: Abe van der Woude (drums); Colin Vermeulen (drums); Chris Bruining (percussion); Tommie Freke (alto saxophone); Ko Zandvliet (trombone); Mart van Baalen (trombone); Bo Floor (trumpet); Glenn van Dam (trumpet)
- Website: gallowstreet.nl

Gallowstreet is a Dutch brass band from Amsterdam. Their beat-driven sound blends hip hop, funk and afrobeat for brass, reeds and percussion.

== History ==
Gallowstreet is named after the Galgenstraat (literally “Gallows Street”) in Amsterdam, where the band first formed in 2012.

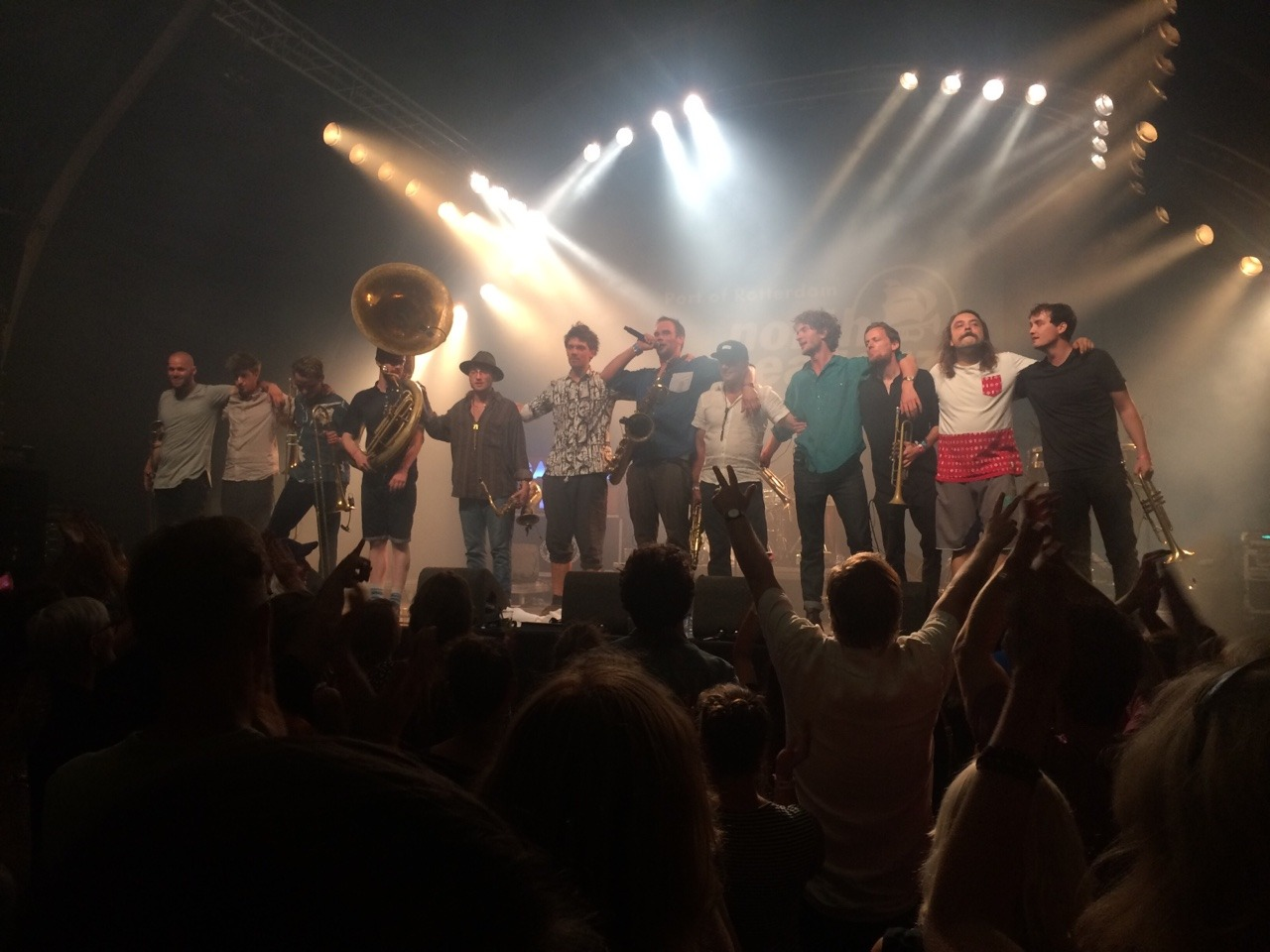
Gallowstreet in 2017

Early festival highlights include Eurosonic Noorderslag (2014), North Sea Jazz (2017), and Lowlands (2016).

In 2017, the group was a finalist for the Edison Jazzism Audience Award for their debut album Battleplan (2016).

On 16 February 2018 the band hosted its own brass night, HONK!, at a sold-out Paradiso in Amsterdam; a second edition followed on 8 March 2019.

On 10 August 2019 Gallowstreet performed a special collaboration with the string collective Pynarello at the Concertgebouw in Amsterdam; the repertoire was rearranged for brass plus strings and later released as the live EP Gallowstreet Royale ft. Pynarello – Live at the Concertgebouw (2021). The collaboration continued with a Dutch tour in 2022 and a joint concert at Carré on 10 November 2022.

== Discography ==
Albums

- EP (2014)
- Battleplan (2016, V2 Records Benelux)
- Hot Lava Sex Machine (2018, V2 Records Benelux)
- Our Dear Metropolis (2020, INI Movement)
- Laaglands (2023, ZenneZ Records)
- A Trip Worth Making (2024, Wicked Wax / INI Movement)

Selected singles

- "Hattori" (2015)
- "Intoxicated" (2015)
- "Sylvie" (2017)
- "DeLorean Cowboy" (2018)

== Trivia ==
- On the morning of 15 January 2014, trombonist Mart van Baalen lost his vintage “King 2B Liberty” trombone near Amsterdam Central Station while en route to perform on Radio 6; the story was widely covered but the instrument was never recovered.

== Gallery ==
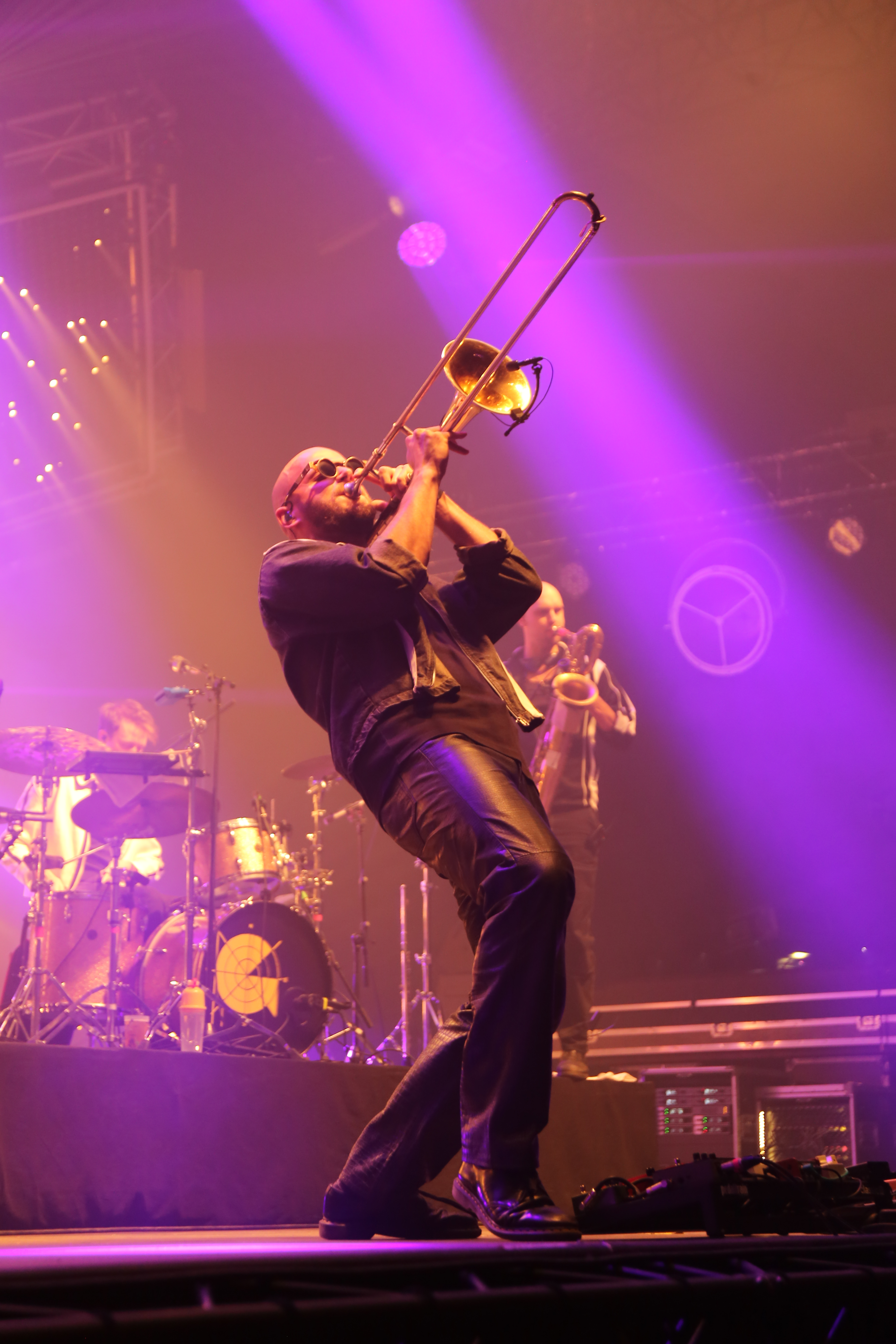
At Trans Musicales 2024

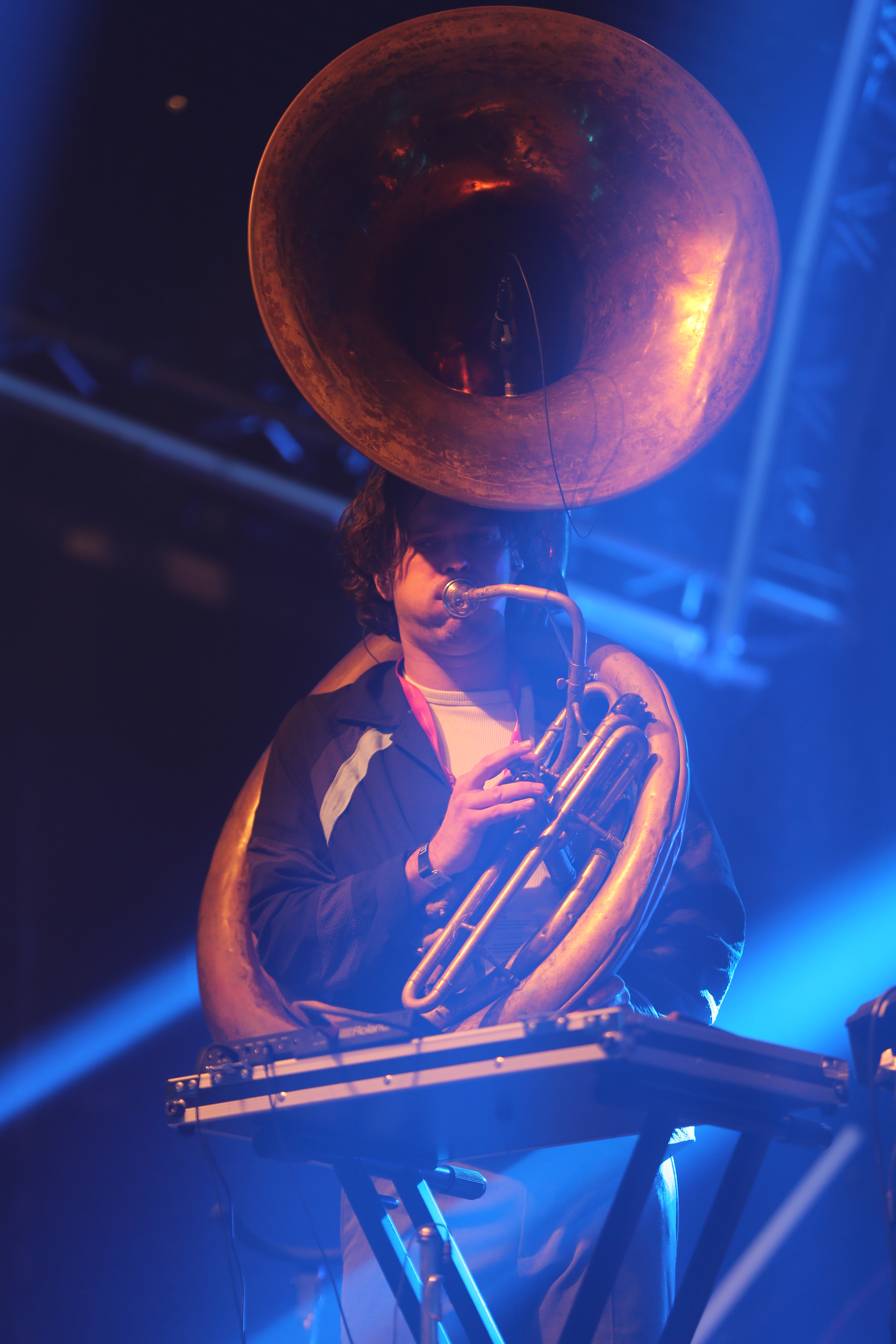
At Trans Musicales 2024

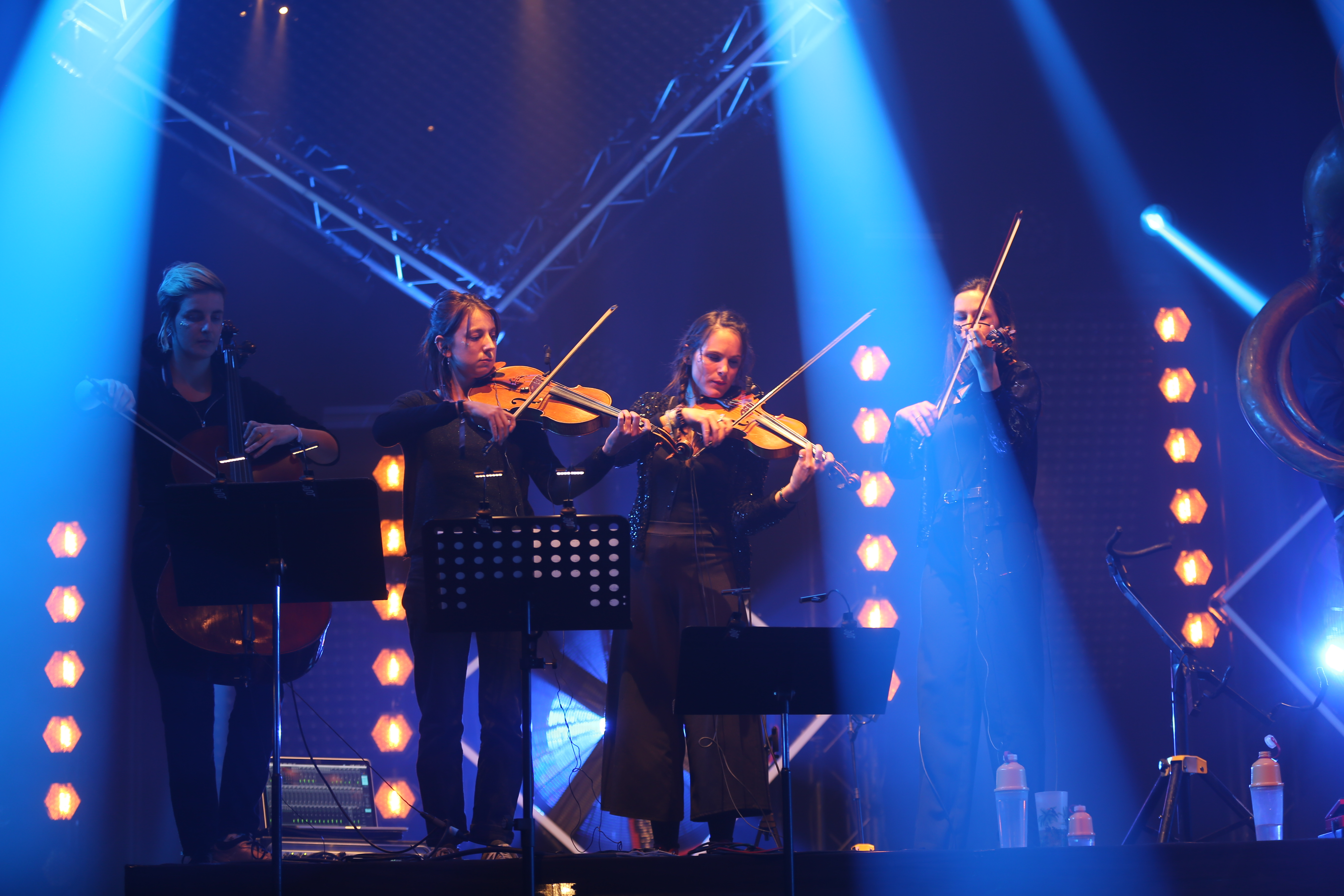
At Trans Musicales 2024

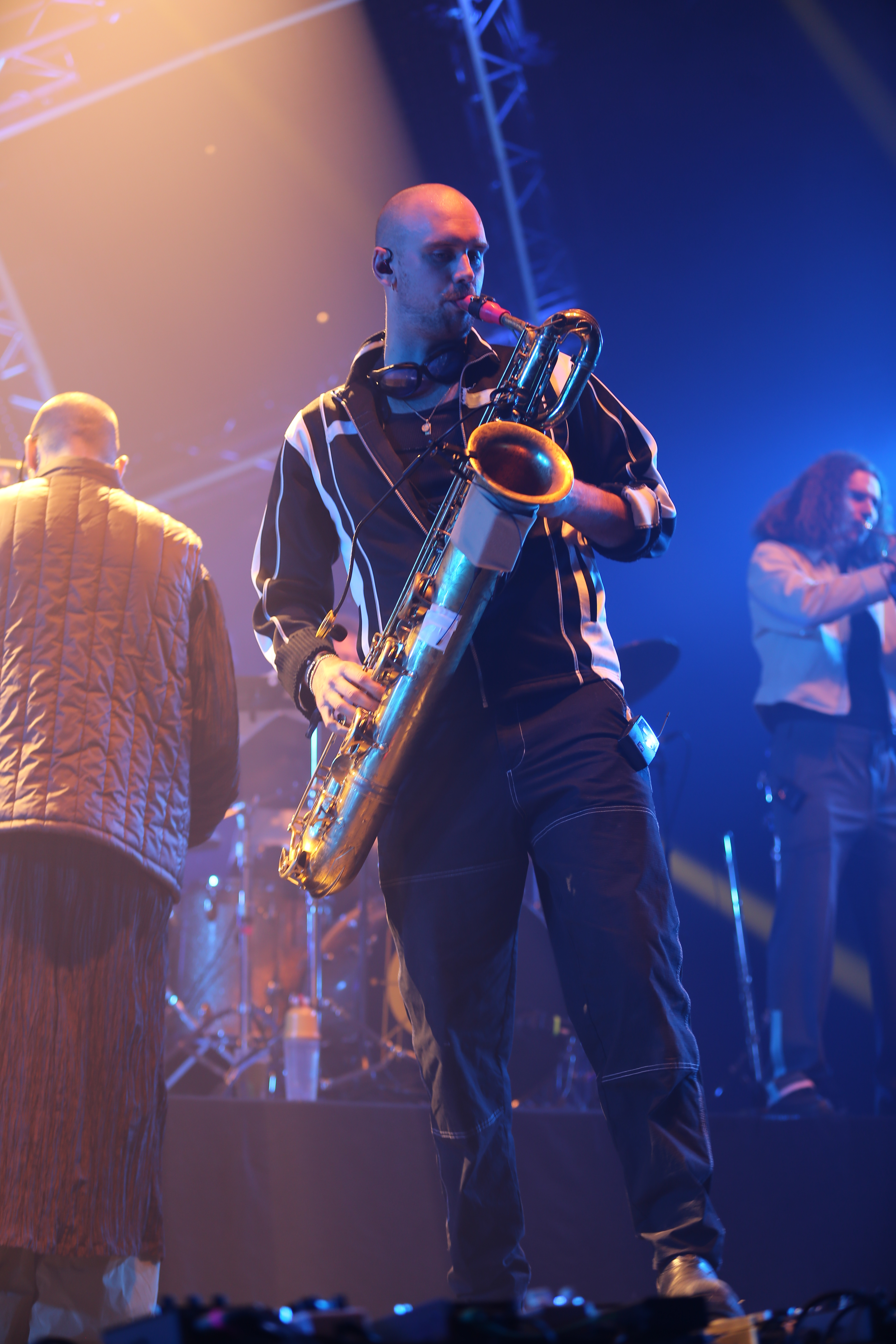
At Trans Musicales 2024

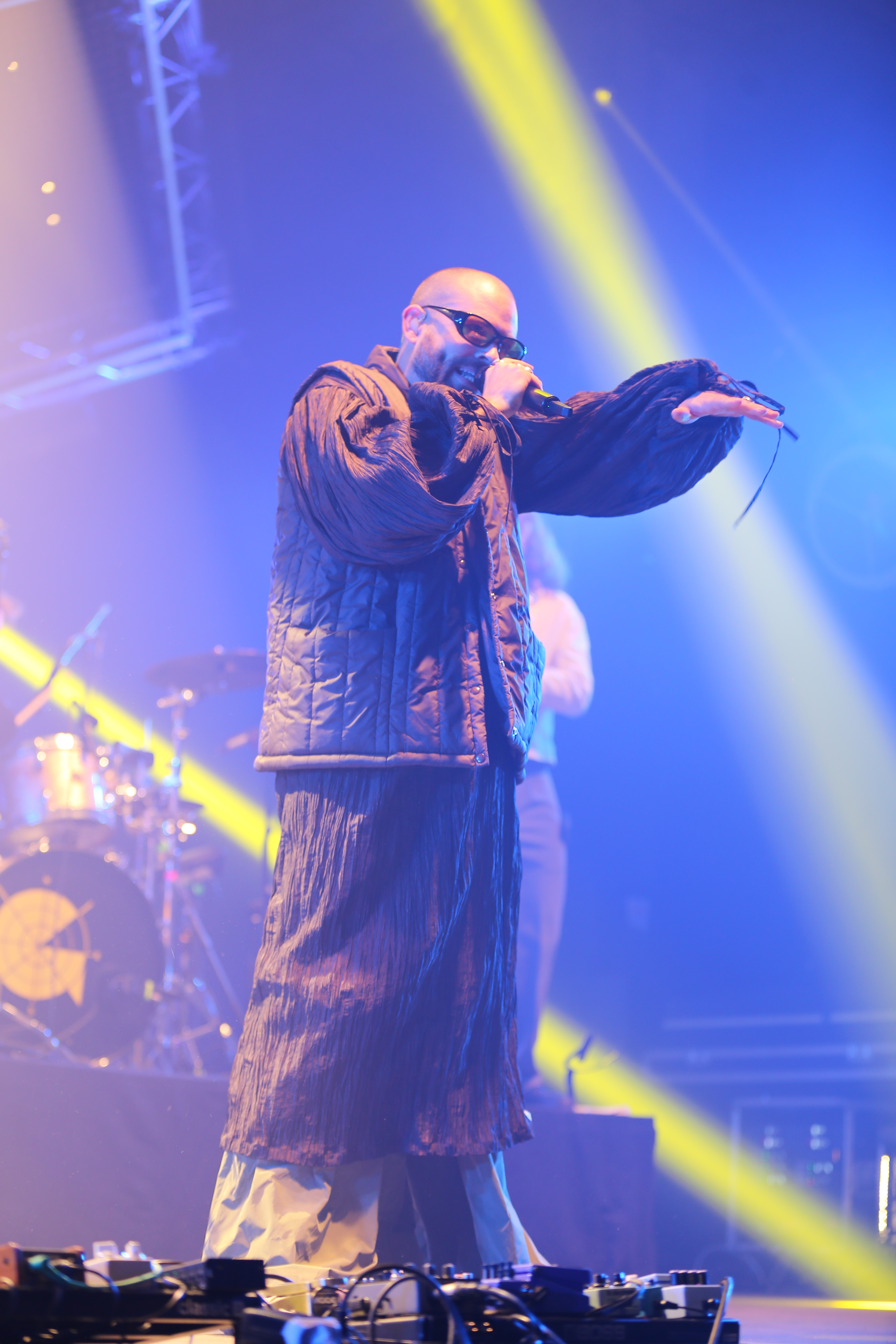
At Trans Musicales 2024
