= Three Equals for four trombones, WoO 30 =

1812 compositions bt Ludwig van Beethven

Score of the Three Equals for four trombones; Breitkopf & Härtel, 1888

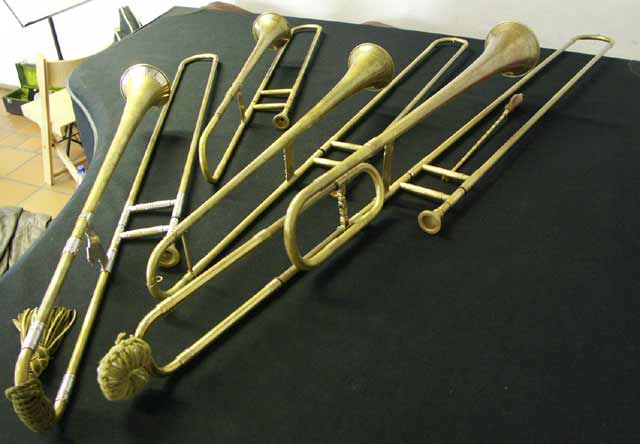
Sackbuts, an early form of trombone (Posaune) still use in the late 17th century

The Three Equals for four trombones, WoO 30 (German: Drei Equale für vier Posaunen), are three short equales (or equali) for trombones by Ludwig van Beethoven.

They were commissioned in the autumn of 1812 by the Stadtkapellmeister of Linz, Franz Xaver Glöggl, for performance as tower music on All Souls' Day. They were first performed at the Old Cathedral, Linz on 2 November 1812.

Two of the equals (nos. 1 & 3) were performed at Beethoven's funeral on 29 March 1827, both by a trombone quartet and also in vocal arrangements by Ignaz Seyfried.

The arrangements of Nos. 1 and 3 by Seyfried are settings for men's voices of two verses from the 'Miserere'. (Note: Misere mei, Domine, the Latin words of Psalm 51 (50). See also full Latin text.) These were sung at the funeral, alternating with the trombones. The remaining Equal, no. 2 (again arranged by Seyfried for male voice choir) was sung at the dedication of Beethoven's gravestone on the first anniversary of his death in March 1828.

A clean manuscript copy, checked by Beethoven, was made of the original manuscript as part of a complete edition of his work ('Gesamtausgabe') by his Vienna publisher Tobias Haslinger. Although Seyfried's arrangements, published in 1827 and 1829, received public performances and were reprinted in 19th-century books about Beethoven, the original score for trombones wasn't published until 1888 as part of Breitkopf & Härtel's 'old' Beethoven Edition.

All three equals were played at the state funerals of W. E. Gladstone and King Edward VII, where one writer remarked on their "tones of weird simplicity and exquisite pathos", and they have become part of the standard trombone repertory.

== Etymology ==
The title of Beethoven's work, 'Drei Equale für vier Posaunen' is derived from the mediaeval Latin musical term ad equales or a voce (or a parte) equali. It designates two or more performers who sustain an equally difficult and important part ('equal voices') in either vocal or instrumental music, written for a particular restricted range of voice parts.

The term gained popularity during the 16th century among writers on music theory. Equal-voiced music is contrasted with pieces written 'a voce piena, or for a 'full range of voices'.

The singular and plural forms in various languages are confusingly similar:

- Mediaeval Latin: 'aequale' (plural 'tres aequali')
- English: 'equal' (plural 'three equals')
- German: 'Equal' (plural 'drei Equale')
- Italian 'uguale' (plural 'tre uguali')

Although the German word 'Posaune' is usually rendered as 'trombone' in English, it has also been used historically to refer to slide trumpets, deriving from Middle High German busīne, busūne, 'trumpet', from Old French buisine, busine, from Latin bucina, Italian buccina. 'Posaune' can be generally applied to brass instruments, as in 'Posaunenchor' (brass band).

== Equal voices ==
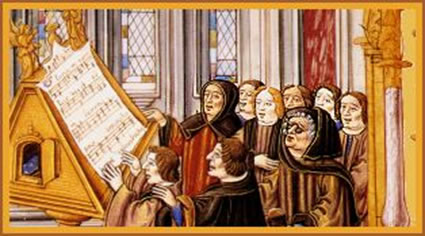
Johannes Ockeghem. Detail of 16th century painting.

Equal-voiced music, written for a specific restricted range of voices was developed through the Middle Ages and continues to be composed. The names used during the 14th to 16th centuries to describe the various voice parts have become part of the modern vocabulary of music, both vocal and instrumental.

Music written during the Middle Ages for a full range of voices, including treble, mid-range and bass parts, was described by music theoreticians who used the term 'a voce piena ("for full voice" or "full range"). As well as writing pieces a voce piena, composers used more restricted ranges throughout the sixteenth century, in all major genres, and for a number of reasons. Various terms were used by writers on music to describe this type of music under headings such as ad aequales, a voci pari, the "grammatically peculiar" a voce paribus, or the related term, a voci mutate.

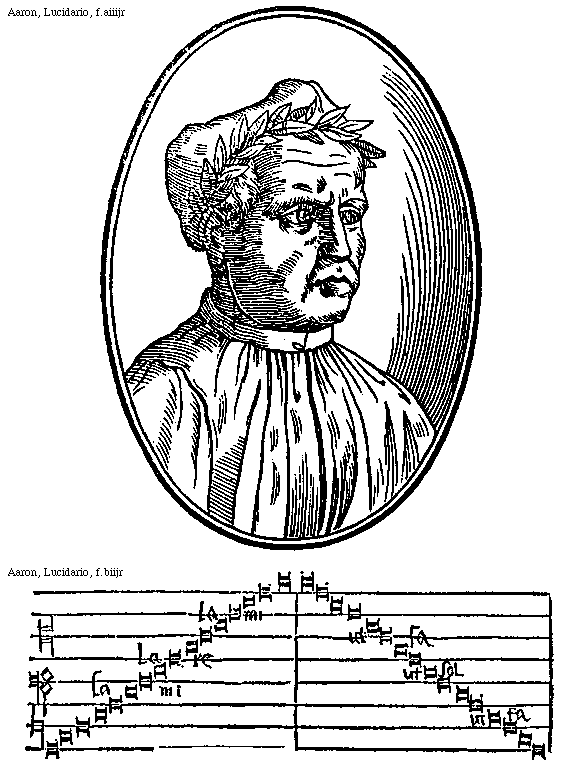
Pietro Aaron, with an example from Lucidario in musica ('Clarity in Music'), 1545

Such designations have often been translated and understood as "equal voices", but the wide variety of music answering to this description shows that these labels are often inadequate or even quite misleading. The multiplicity of Latin phrases used to describe the various voice parts of polyphonic medieval music became associated with modern voice types of treble, alto, tenor and bass.

The terms mentioned above came into use during the development of plainchant, which was sung to a single melody or cantus held by the tenor (from Lat. tenere, 'to hold'.) As polyphonic music developed, a second voice above the cantus was termed the contratenor. The third part was the triplum (the 'third' voice up from the tenor part, the modern 'treble').

By the 15th century the highest musical line was named discantus (whence modern 'descant'), or superius, 'highest': and the contratenor developed into the medium-high contratenor altus (hence modern 'countertenor' and 'alto') and the lower contratenor bassus, or modern bass. These terms are applied to music for any mix or range of voices, both a voce piena and a voce equale.

Aurelio Virgiliano ("Il Dolcimeo"): Nuova Intavolatura di Tromboni per Sonarli in Concerto (c. 1600). The first diagrammatic representation of trombone positions.

For music written for e.g. men's voices, or trombones, a certain amount of re-distribution of the full-range harmony was necessary. For most of the early fifteenth-century, French chanson repertory for equal voices – whether in two, three or four voices – the discantus and tenor occupy ranges separated by about a fifth. The contratenor will then be in the same range as the tenor; and the triplum, if there is one, will be in the same range as the discantus.

In the sixteenth century a self-conscious and systematic distinction began to be drawn between conventional, full-range musical textures and those with equal-voiced textures. Treatises by music theoreticians such as Pietro Aron, Nicola Vicentino, Gioseffo Zarlino, Thomas Morley, and not least the "monstrous" El melopeo y maestro by Pietro Cerone all contain remarks on writing for equal voices.

== Town pipers ==
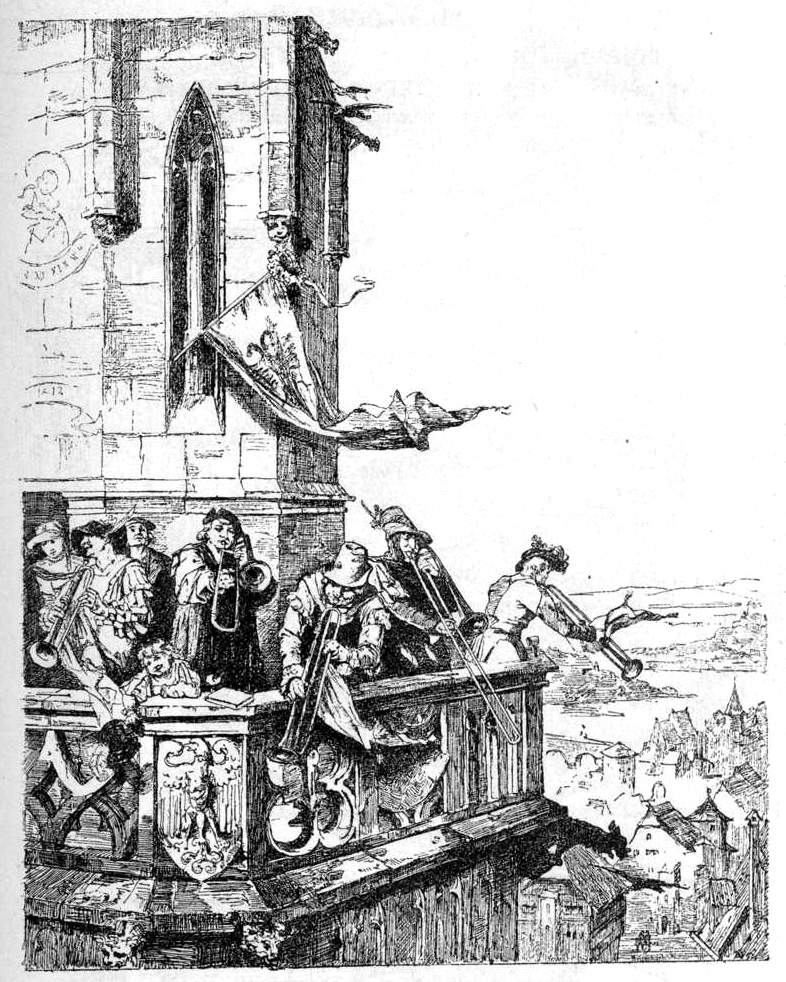
A Stadtpfeifer band with trombones playing tower music. 19th century engraving.

One of the most popular forms of outdoors public music-making in the 17th century in Germany and central Europe was tower music (German: Turmmusik), organised by the town piper (Stadtpfeifer) or tower master (Turmmeister). He and his band of musicians, also called Stadtpfeifer (the German plural is the same as the singular) played music for loud and penetrating wind or brass instruments (alta cappella) from church towers and town hall balconies. (Note: The term 'tower master' seems to have been applied to various jobs. One was as the musical director of town or city music, such as Glöggl in Linz, and e.g. the theatre director Franz Pokorny (1797–1850) in Pressburg (Bratislava). Bohuslav Martinů's father, a sexton and town watchman lived in the church tower in Polička as the turmmeister, but in e.g. Cologne they seem to have been a type of civic constable or magistrate with arresting powers c. 1530 or one competent to examine midwives c. 1650.)

These civic wind bands of town pipers had been a feature of larger German towns and cities since well before the beginning of the sixteenth century, similar to the employment of waits with their sackbuts and shawms in England. Martin Luther, one of the chief figures of the Reformation, encouraged music-making in the service of God, and by around 1570 town councils were employing musicians specifically to take part in church services to supplement the organ playing.

Generations of the Bach family in Erfurt filled the office of Stadtpfeifer or Ratsmusiker (German: 'town council musician'). By 1600 Halle, Dresden, Berlin, Cologne, Stettin, Nordhausen and even Eisenach (J. S. Bach's birthplace) with only 6,000 inhabitants, all had 'Stadpfeifers', whose job it was to sound the hours ('Stundenblasen') in the days before striking clocks were common in towers and churches. They started around 3 or 4 o'clock in the morning to start the working day, sounded (German: blasen, lit. 'blew') the mid-morning break around 10 o'clock (Latin: decima hora) and the afternoon break around three or four o'clock in the afternoon. Finally, at around 9 or 10 o'clock, there was an Abendsegen, or evening blessing. Well known pieces by and for 'Stadtpfeifer' include Johann Schein's Banchetto musicale (1617) and Samuel Scheidt's Ludi Musici (1621).

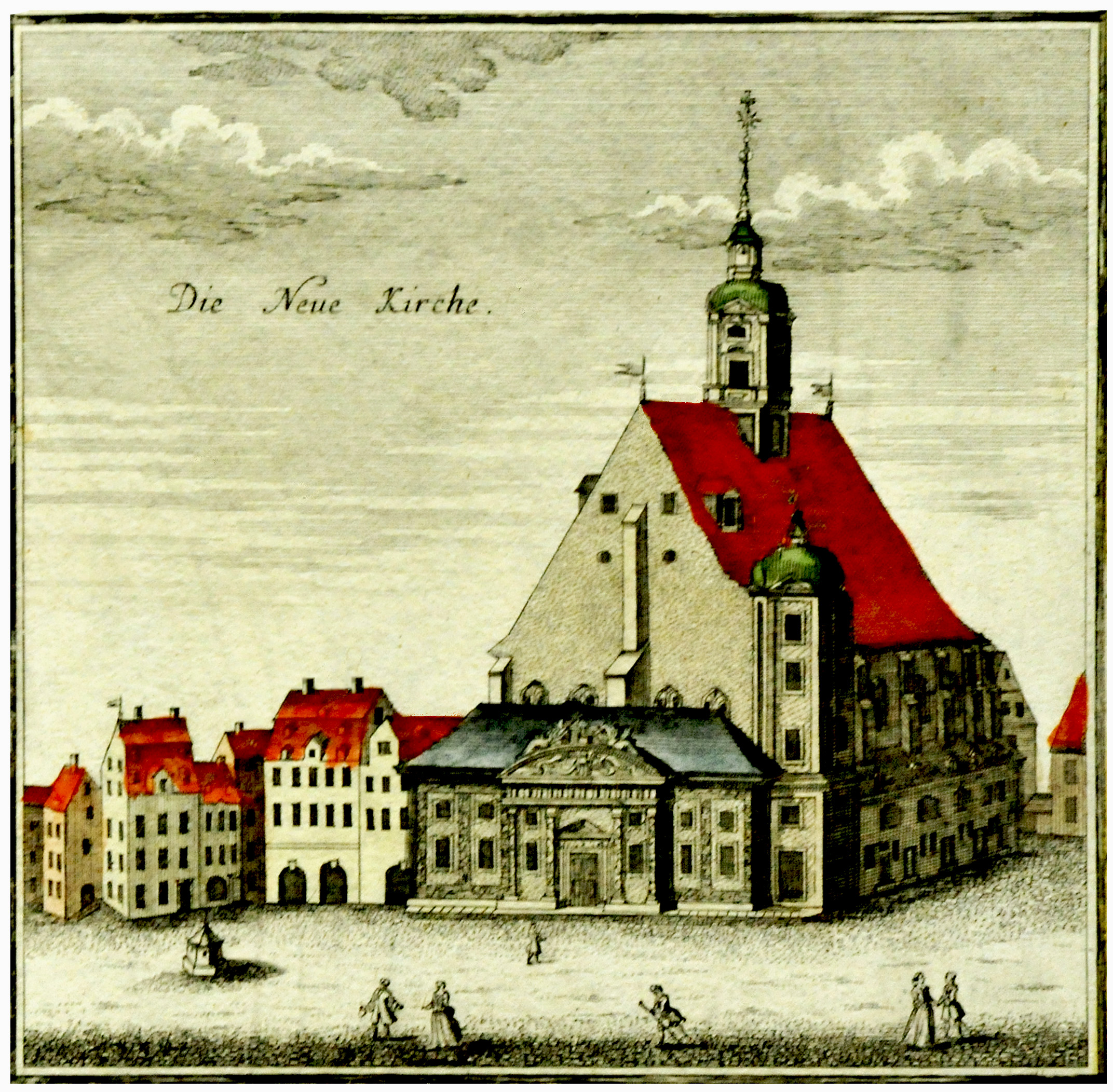
The Neukirche (New Church), Leipzig in 1749

In Nuremberg and Leipzig and there was a particular penchant for antiphonal tower music: three verses of a hymn would be echoed back and forth three times between the bands stationed in the towers of the Neukirche, St. Thomas Church and St. Nicholas Church, Leipzig. The Leipzig Stadtpfeifer and tower master ('Turmmeister') of St. Nicholas Church from 1669 was Johann Pezel (or Petzold, etc.) whose Hora decima musicorum Lipsiensium ('Leipzig 10 o'clock music') was published the following year, as well as Fünff-stimmigte blasende Music (1685) with five-part intradas and dance pieces for brass instruments. Another Leipzig Stadtpfeifer and virtuoso trumpet player Gottfried Reiche (1667–1734) described tower music in his preface to Vier und zwanzig Neue Quatricinia (1696) for cornett and three trombones, as "a sign of joy and peace", an embodiment of the spiritual-cultural life of the city "certainly whenever the whole country is in mourning, or in war, or when other misfortune is to be lamented." (Note: "Und so, wie Gottfried Reiche im Turmblasen 'ein Freuden und Friedens-Zeichen' sieht, da 'wo solche Musik muss eingestellet werden, gewiss ein Land-Trauern, Krieg oder sonst ein Unglück zu beweinen ist', so könnte die Turmmusik als ein solches 'Freuden- und Friedens-Zeichen' auch das geistig-kulturelle Leben unserer Stadt wesentlich bereichern.")

Although the revival of music in churches was a particularly Lutheran initiative, Catholic areas like Vienna and Salzburg were just as keen to promote tower music. Among the most popular of tunes were the Heilig-Leider, paraphrases in German of the Sanctus from the Latin Mass, which came into fashion after the enlightened reforms of the Holy Roman Emperor Joseph I promoted the use of the vernacular in church services. According to one Stadtpfeifer named Hornbock, quoted in Johann Kuhnau's Quack-Salber: "We know from experience that when our city pipers in the festive season play a religious song with nothing but trombones from the tower, then we are greatly moved, and imagine that we hear the angels singing.".

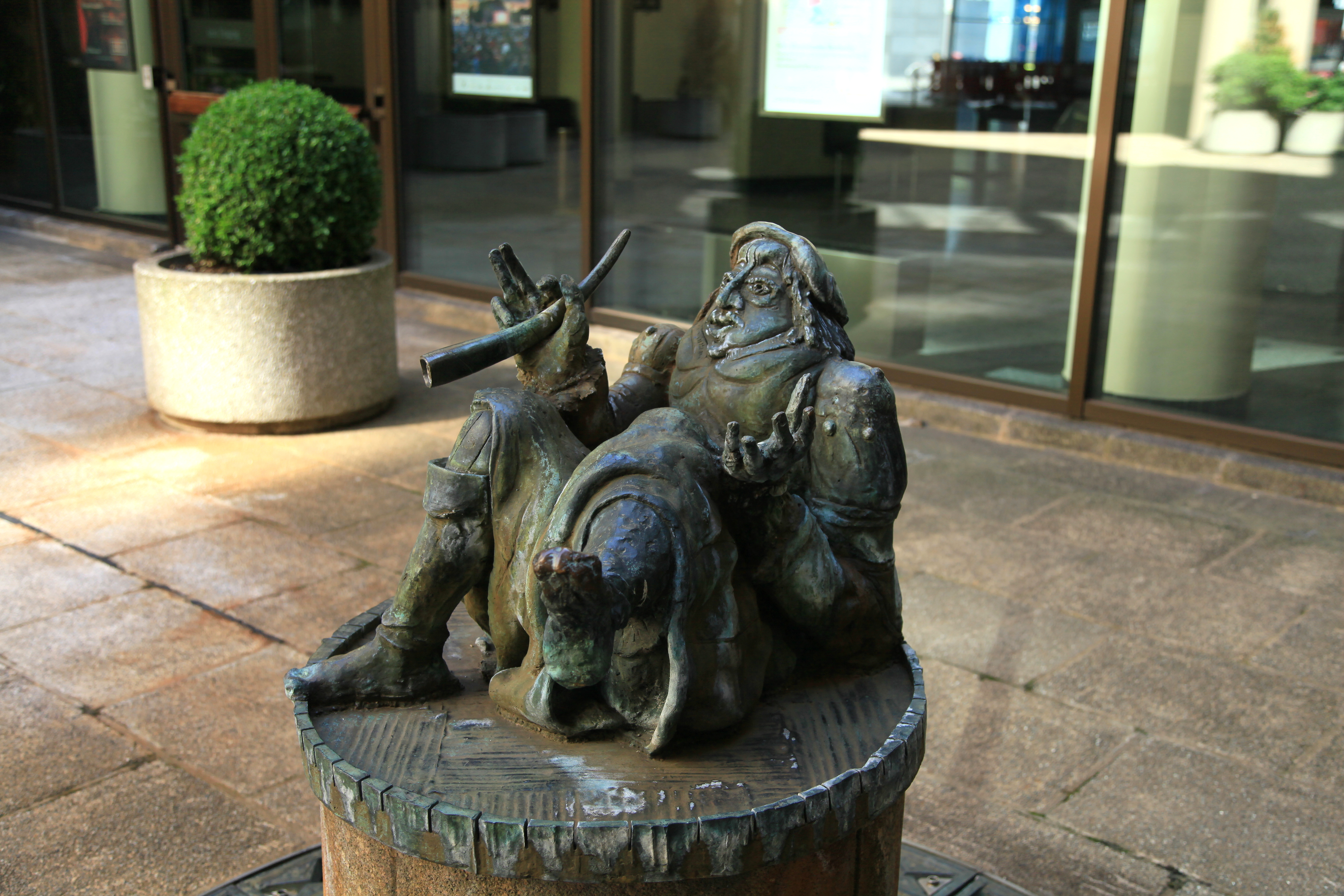
Fountain of a Stadtpfeifer in the atrium of the Neues Gewandhaus, Leipzig

There was a distinct difference between the town or city bands who played cornetts and trombones, and the guilds ('Kameradschaften') of Imperial trumpeters and kettle-drummers, who played fanfares and other ceremonial duties for the emperor, kings, imperial princes, counts and other nobles. From around 1630 to the end of the 18th century these guilds jealously guarded their Imperial Privilege which allowed them exclusive use of trumpets and drums. Court cases were common in which Statdpfeifers and ordinary musicians had their instruments confiscated, and violence was not uncommon. Trumpeters were not allowed to mix with the town pipers, and the playing of trumpets in processions, dances or sounding an alarm was strictly forbidden. Johann Schein, the Leipzig Stadtpfeifer mentioned above, was prosecuted for using trumpets in a performance in the Thomaskirche, and admonished to use cornetts in future.

The art of trombone-playing was also kept a trade secret by musicians' guilds who feared the loss of their livelihood, one reason why there are few early treatises on the subject. This lack was addressed by Daniel Speer, Stadpfeifer of Stuttgart during the 1660s, whose Grund-Richter (1687, 2nd expanded ed. 1697) was one of the first books written specifically for teachers and students of wind and brass instruments and kettle-drums.

In Germany and Austria, brass music became generally associated with all sorts of events: at parish/community festivals, at burials in funeral processions, as spiritual company during confirmations; dedications at churches, harvest festivals etc.; playing in the New Year; at Epiphany (Dreikönigsblasen), Christmas and Easter; children's bands playing for the sick, the aged, anniversaries, birthdays etc.; and serenades of all kinds.

In Austria, trombones were typically played from church towers (German Turmblasen, lit 'tower blowing') or in cemeteries on All Souls' Day and the previous day (Hallowe'en in England). Their use is mentioned in a handbook explaining the multitude of church music regulations, Kirchenmusik-Ordnung (1828), by the Linz Stadtpfeifer Franz Glöggl. (Note: A review of the book shows how useful the book was in gathering together and explaining the many rules concerning music at church services.)

There appears an explanatory guide of musical worship, according to the existing church music-order for all functions occurring on Sundays, festivals, vespers, litanies, masses, funerals, processions etc. while chants, songs for the congregation, motets, introiten, versicles, graduals, offertories, responses etc. It explains the ritual-texts from the measurement book and Breviarium, and is found at a very cheap price. In all countries where Roman Catholic worship prevails, through its essential usefulness of numerous sales, where the lack of such a reliable signpost has been felt for a long time: until the present moment when – wonderfully enough – under the supervision of some well-informed experts – the simple expedient of this book has been devised.

It was Glöggl who commissioned the Three Equals from Beethoven in 1812. They were both pupils of Johann Albrechtsberger (d. 1807), who wrote one of the first trombone concertos.

Tower music reached a peak in around 1750, and thereafter declined towards the end of the 18th century. From around 1800 official civic concerts began to replace those given by the nobility, and what has been termed "Saint Culture" ('St.-Kultur') suffered a split, leading on one side to the growth of professional symphony orchestras, and on the other to amateur Stadtkapellen conducted by professional or semi-professional town music directors.

== Composition and first performance ==
"[Beethoven's] connection with the long and honourable tradition of tower music is certain", and represents "... a late contribution to the vanishing repertoire."

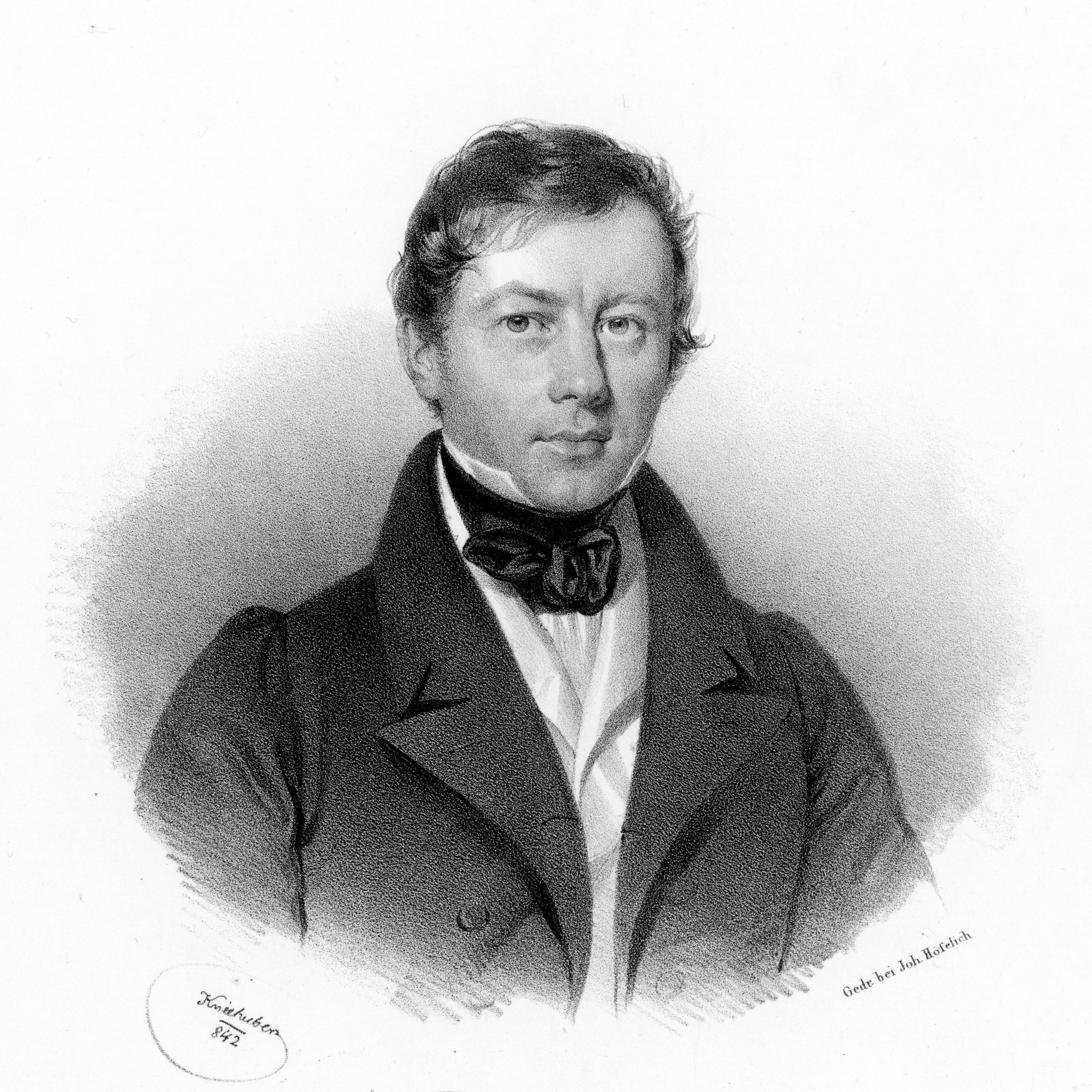
Tobias Haslinger, Beethoven's publisher and first owner of the manuscript. Posthumous? lithograph by Joseph Kriehuber, 1842

Beethoven completed his seventh symphony in the summer of 1812, later published as Op. 92. He began work straight away on the eighth symphony, but continued to suffer the same headaches and high fever from the year before. His doctor again ordered Beethoven to rest in the Bohemian spa town of Teplitz, where he wrote the well-known letter to his "Immortal Beloved", whose identity is still unknown. He also finally met Goethe in Teplitz in July 1812, a somewhat equivocal meeting of minds. Beethoven, out walking in the company of Goethe, deliberately walked straight through the midst of some royalties with his hands in his pockets, and rebuked Goethe for being too deferential.

Furthermore, Beethoven's youngest brother, (Nikolaus) Johann, had begun cohabiting during 1812 with Therese Obermayer, who already had a 5-year-old illegitimate daughter (Amalie Waldmann) from a previous relationship. (Note: Johann was a pharmacist who followed Ludwig from Bonn to Vienna in 1795, and worked in a pharmacy there until 1808. He then moved to Linz, opening his own successful pharmacy.) Beethoven journeyed to Linz in late September 1812, primarily to convince Johann to end the relationship. (Note: World affairs: On 7 September 1812, Beethoven's erstwhile hero Napoleon had just fought the bloody but inconclusive Battle of Borodino, and two days later the Grande Armée entered Moscow, whose mayor had deliberately set it ablaze to deny the city to the French invaders.) Although he finished the eighth symphony after only four months in Linz in October, Johann remained obdurate, and Beethoven appealed instead to the bishop, to the civic authorities and to the police.

Composition

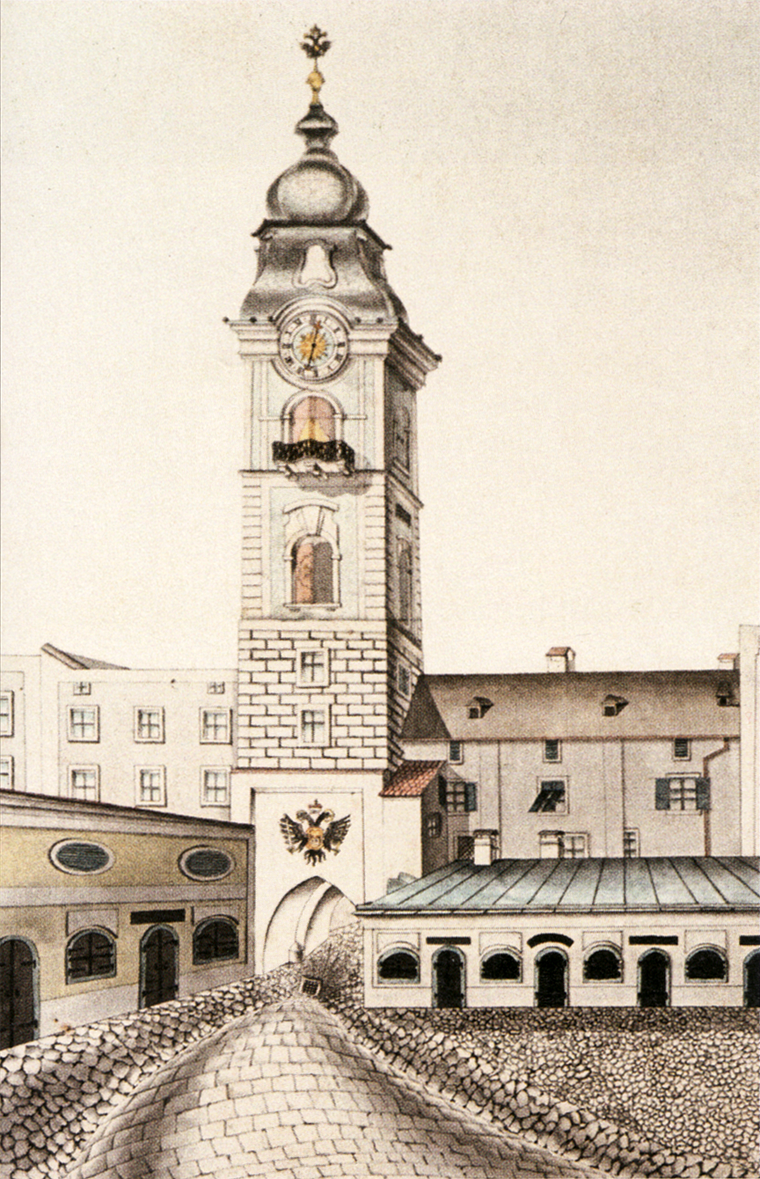
The Schmidtor-Turm, Linz, demolished in 1828. Pen and ink drawing with watercolour by Franz Laudacher.

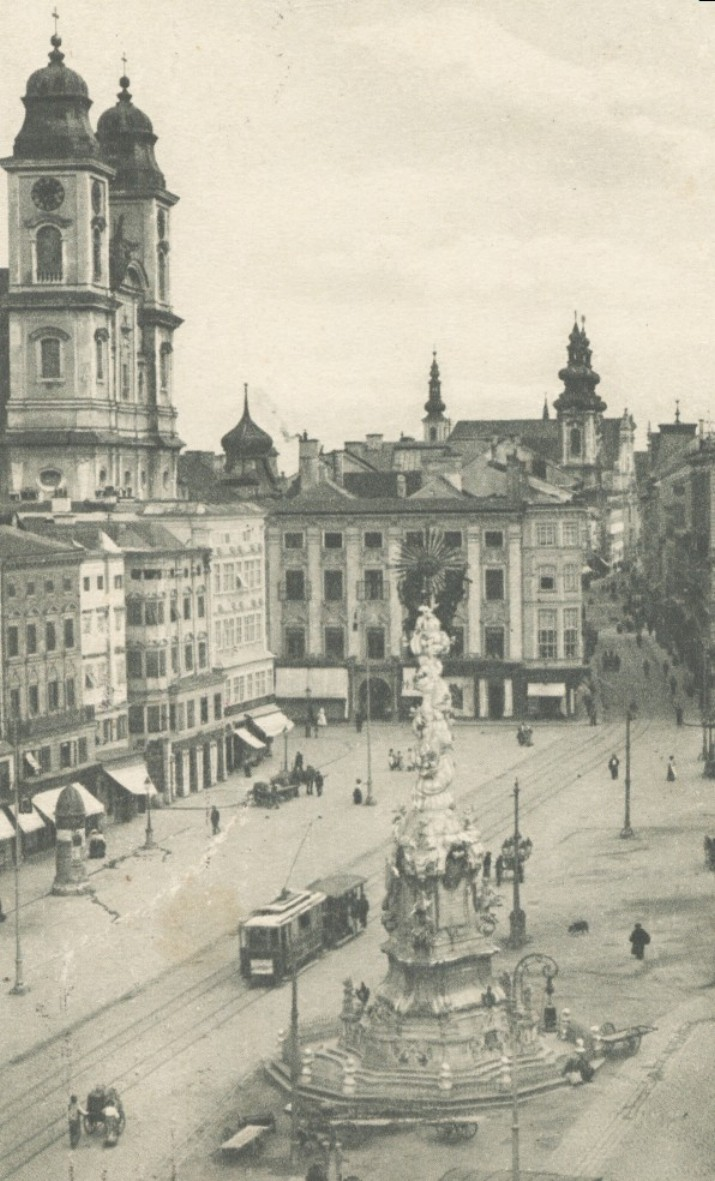
The towers of the Old Cathedral, overlooking the de:Hauptplatz, Linz (1913)

Background

The Stadtpfeifer in Linz at the time was Franz Xaver Glöggl, whose full title was Stadtcapell- und Turmmeister (i.e. 'director of city music and tower master'). Glöggl had been appointed as Tonkünstler und Musik-Commissioneur in 1789, living at Schmidtor 41. The following year he was Stadt- und Dommusikdirektor und Casininounternehmer ('director of city and cathedral music, and casino manager'). He may have been the world's first basset-horn teacher. Glöggl lived in the Schmidtor (de) or Schmiedtor-Turm (Smithgate Tower), provided for the Stadtpfeifer's use by the city: "A narrow staircase led from the street into the tower, where the tower master lived with his fellows."

Glöggl, as tower master, asked Beethoven for some trombone music to be played at the cathedral on All Souls' Day (2 November). According to an anonymous account (probably by Haslinger) printed in the introduction to Ignaz Seyfried's choral settings of the equals:

L. van Beethoven ... was asked by the local cathedral Kapellmeister, Mr Glöggl, to compose for him so-called Equale for four trombones for All Souls' Day (November 2nd), which he would then have his musicians play, as was usual, on this feast. Beethoven declared himself willing; he actually wrote three movements for this purpose, which are indeed short, but which, through the excellence of their design, attest to the master's hand; and the current publisher of these same [works] was later so fortunate to be able to enrich his collection, which through the many autographs of this great composer had acquired such estimable worth, with this original manuscript. (Note: Bassano n.d., citing Seyfried 1827, p. 2)

Beethoven may have written more than the three equals which have come down to us. 1838 Glöggl himself reported in a letter to Robert Schumann that "he [Beethoven] also wrote me some mourning pieces for trombones, of which I gave two to my friend Haslinger in Vienna, and one of them was played at his funeral. He wrote them in my room, and I kept one back for myself alone." (Note: Voss 2012, p. 3, citing Kopitz, Cadenbach & Tanneberger 2009, p. 354)

According to the memoirs of Glöggl's son Franz (Note: F. X. Glöggl's son Franz Glöggl (Linz, 2 Feb 1796 – 23 Jan 1872, Vienna). Studied with Salieri from 1813 and was archivist of the Gesellschaft der Musikfreunde from 1830 to 1849. He started an art and music shop in 1844, and in 1849 was a co-founder of the Akadamie der Tonstkunst.) (though these were not written until 1872):

My father asked Beethoven to write him an Equale for 6 trombones, since in his collection of old instruments he still owned a soprano trombone and a quart trombone [presumably a bass trombone in F], (Note: (Original author's brackets.) For soprano and quart trombones, see Herbert 2006, pp. 28, 36, 345n, but see also Myers, Herbert W. (August 1989). "Slide Trumpet Madness: Fact or Fiction?". Early Music. 17 (3). Oxford University Press: 382–389. JSTOR 3127078. and then Howard Weiner: "The Soprano Trombone Hoax", Historic Brass Society Journal, 2001.) whereas usually only alto, tenor, and bass trombones were used. But Beethoven wanted to hear an Equale as played at funerals in Linz, so it came about that my father one afternoon summoned three trombonists, since Beethoven was eating with us at that time, and had them play an Equale of this sort; following which Beethoven sat down and wrote one for 6 trombones, which my father also had his trombonists play. (Note: Voss 2012, p. 3, citing Kopitz, Cadenbach & Tanneberger 2009, p. 350)

However, there is no evidence in the manuscript itself that he composed a fourth piece that was subsequently separated from it. Beethoven's manuscript was acquired by Tobias Haslinger, Beethoven's publisher, to add to his collection of Beethoven MSS: "The original MS of this curious production is in the possession of Mr. Haslinger, and prized as a relic of no common kind."

Not long after the solemn music was performed on Sunday 2 November, Johann van Beethoven and Therese Obermayer finally got married on 8 November 1812 and Beethoven returned to Vienna. (Note: In early 1813 Beethoven apparently went through a difficult emotional period, and his compositional output dropped. His personal appearance degraded—it had generally been neat—as did his manners in public, especially when dining. Beethoven took care of his brother (who was suffering from tuberculosis) and his family, an expense that he claimed left him penniless. from Ludwig van Beethoven.)

== Beethoven's funeral ==
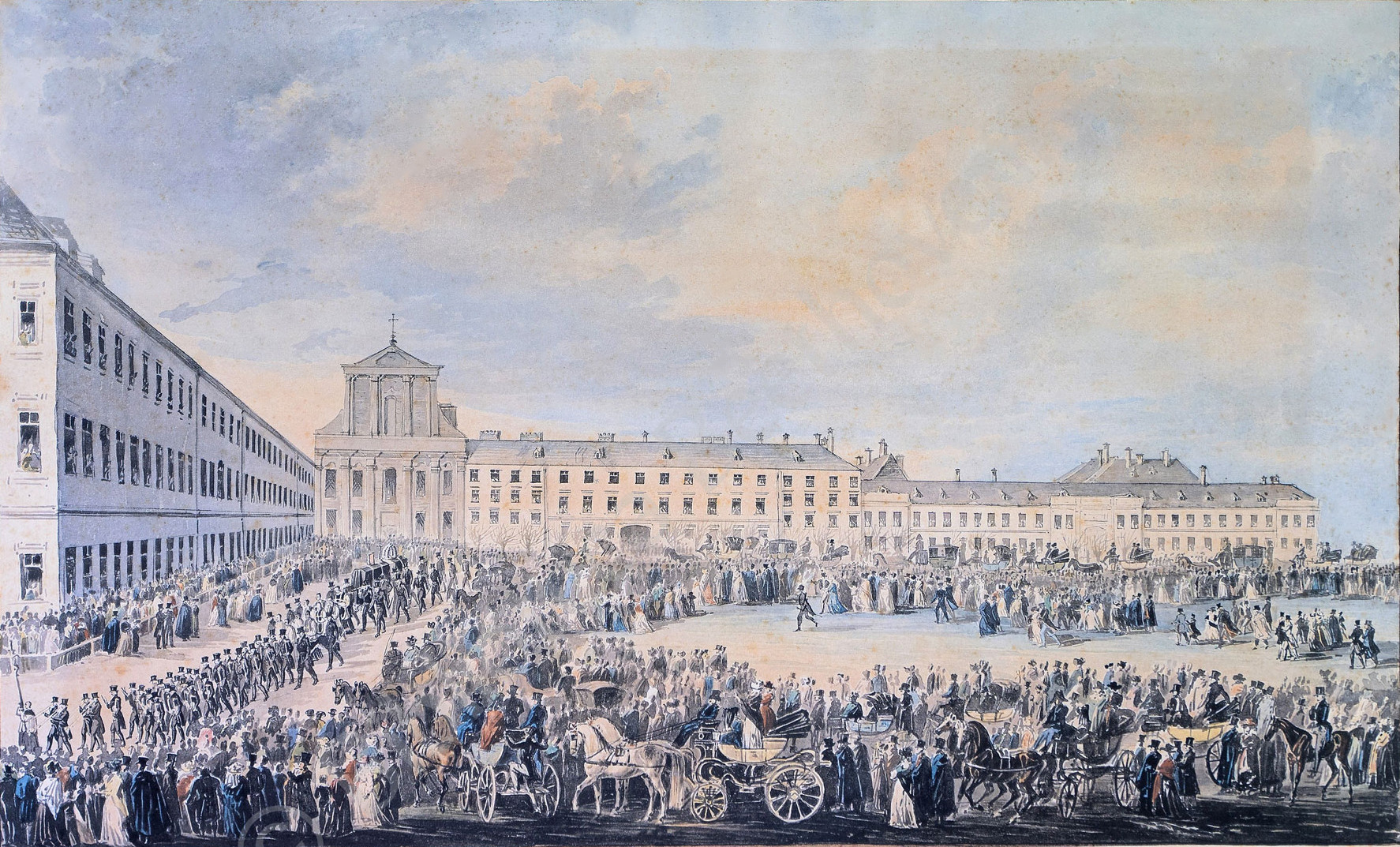
The first two Equales being played at Beethoven's funeral; trombones are visible at the lower left, leading the procession

Fifteen years later, as Beethoven was dying, Haslinger approached Ignaz von Seyfried with the manuscript on the morning of 26 March 1827 to discuss the possibility of forming a choral anthem out of these Equals to the words of the Miserere. Beethoven died that afternoon, and the arrangement was finished that same night.

Beethoven's funeral took place in the afternoon of 29 March 1827. The music was played in accordance with the regulations of the Catholic Church governing the use of music in church, including at funerals. These assorted rules were only gathered together the following year with the publication of Kirchenmusik-Ordnung (1828), ('Church music regulations') by Franz Xaver Glöggl, director of music in Linz and its cathedral (Stadt- und Domkapellmeister'):

"For first-class funerals, the arrival of the clergy will be announced by a short mourning-music (Equale) played on trombones or other wind instruments. This will mark the beginning of the funeral service. After this, the funeral procession will set out, again suitably announced by mourning music played on wind instruments. During the procession, this shall be played alternately with a three- or four-voice choral Miserere until arrival at the entrance of the church or graveyard, where the benediction of the Requiem aeternam is sung. After the benediction and common prayer, a mourning motet is sung."

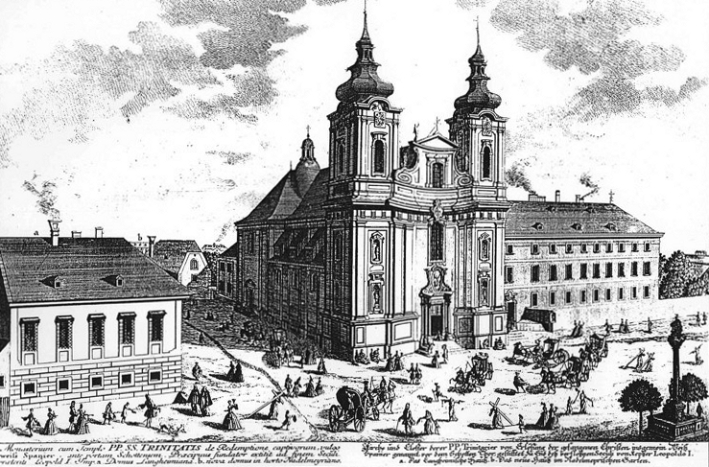
The Alser Kirche in 1724

This corresponds fairly closely to the order in which events took place at the funeral. During the funeral procession from Beethoven's house in the Schwarzspanierhaus to the Alserkirche, nos. 1 & 3 were played alternately, stanza by stanza, first by the four trombones and then sung by the choir.

No. 2 was sung at Beethoven's grave on 26 March 1828, the first anniversary of his death, in another arrangement by Seyfried, setting words by the poet Franz Grillparzer.

== Publication history ==
Tobias Haslinger, Beethoven's publisher, acquired the MS after they were first played. "The original MS of this curious production is in the possession of Mr. Haslinger, and prized as a relic of no common kind." – Haslinger died in 1842.

The MS was used in the preparation of the Haslinger-Rudolphine edition of 1817, (Note: This is the clean manuscript, in a copyist's hand, of the entirety of Beethoven's published works, made for Haslinger's Gesamtausgabe (Complete Edition) undertaken in 1817, authenticated and proofread by Beethoven. The 51-volume collection was bought by Archduke Rudolph for 4,000 gulden in September 1823 when its sale to England was threatened. Rudolph, the youngest son of Leopold II had been appointed Archbishop of Olomouc (Olmütz) in March 1819, and taken Holy Orders.) in which they appeared as 'Short funeral pieces'. This Haslinger-Rudolphine edition was used in the preparation of the 1888 Breitkopf & Härtel edition of the 'Drei Equale für vier Posaunen, WoO 30. The score of the 'New Beethoven edition' was prepared exclusively from the original manuscript.

Seyfried's arrangements for 4-part male chorus were published in Vienna by Haslinger, Nos. 1 & 3 in June 1827, and No. 2 in March 1829. See below.

== Seyfried's arrangements ==
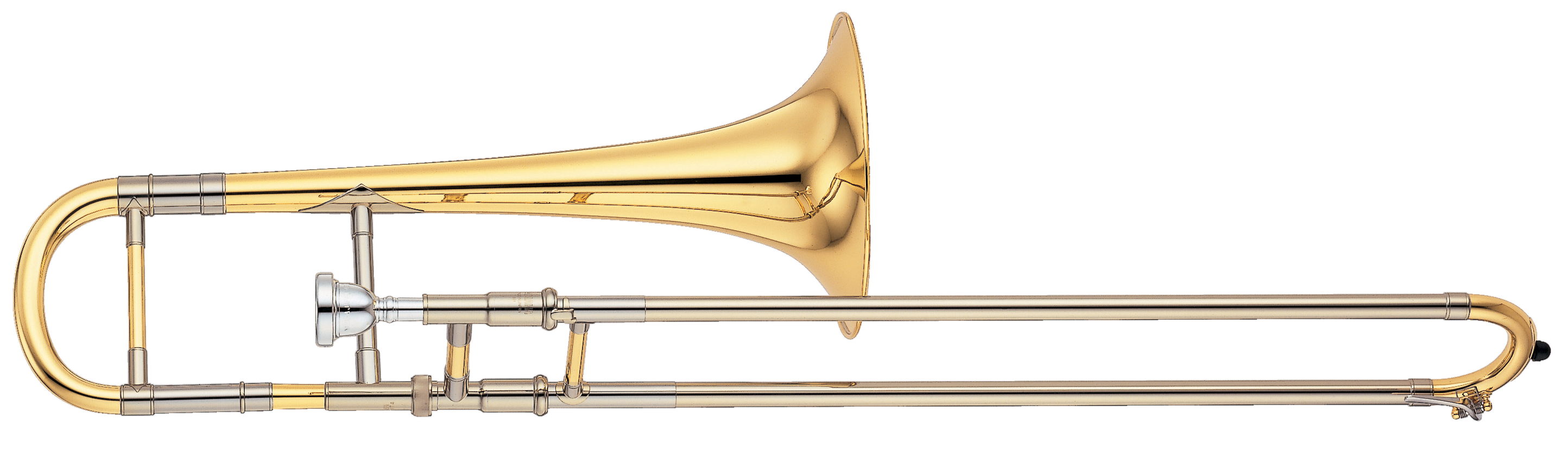
An alto trombone

Ignaz Seyfried was a pupil of Mozart, and along with F. X. Glöggl and Beethoven, a pupil of Johann Albrechtsberger, whose complete works he posthumously edited. A prolific composer of stage works and wind band arranger, Seyfried was the musical director (Kapellmeister) from 1797 of Emanuel Schikaneder's Theater auf der Wieden (where the first performance of Mozart's The Magic Flute took place), and of its successor, the Theater an der Wien, from 1797 to 1826.

Seyfried arranged two of Beethoven's three equals (nos. 1 & 3) for four-part male voice chorus, setting the words of verses 1 and 3 of Psalm 51, Miserere mei, Domine and Amplius. This involved some re-writing in order to give the words the right note-values. The music was transposed a tone lower to make it easier for the vocalists. His arrangements of WoO 30 Nos. 1 and 3 for male voices and piano were published in June 1827, prefaced by a lengthy description of the funeral and the music. (Note: Trauer-Gesang bey Beethoven's Leichenbegängnisse in Wien den 29. März 1827. Vierstimmiger Männerchor, mit willkürlicher Begleitung von vier Posaunen, oder des Pianoforte. Aus Beethoven's Manuscripte zu dein obigen Gebrauche mit Text eingerichtet von Ignaz Ritter von Seyfried. (Plate no. 5034).(Seyfried 1827).) The choral version has many changes from the original trombone music, necessary to accommodate the words of the text and range of the male voices.

Seyfried's arrangement of WoO 30, No. 2, in a setting of words by Franz Grillparzer (Du, dem nie im Leben Ruhstatt ward) was played at the dedication of the gravestone 29 March 1828. Printed as a supplement to Allgemeiner Musikalischer Anzeiger, No. 12 (21 March 1829). (Note: Trauerklänge an Beethovens Grabe. Den 29 März 1828. Männerchor nach einer Choral-Melodie des Verewigten. Worte von Franz Grillparzer.) (Note: Seyfried had previously written the overture and entractes for Grillparzer's 1825 stage play Ottokar’s Glück und Ende.)

Du, dem nie im Leben Ruhstatt ward, und Herd und Haus,
Ruhe nun in Tod aus, im stillen Grabe aus.
Und wenn Freundes Klage reicht über's Grab hinaus,
Horch eig'nen Sangs süssen Klang,
Halb erwacht im stillen, stillen Haus.
(Grillparzer)

You, who in life ne'er had resting place, nor hearth nor house,
Rest now in death, in the quiet grave.
And if your friends' lament transcends the grave,
Hark to your own song's sweet sound,
Half awake in the still, still, house.

These choral arrangements were performed at a Beethoven memorial concert in Nuremberg on 26 March 1828, and appeared in the appendix of Beethoven's Thorough-bass studies, edited by Seyfried. As late as 1806 Nuremberg had a tradition of playing 'Statdpfeiler' antiphonal tower music, consisting of verses of a hymn echoed back and forth from church to church.

== Performance history ==
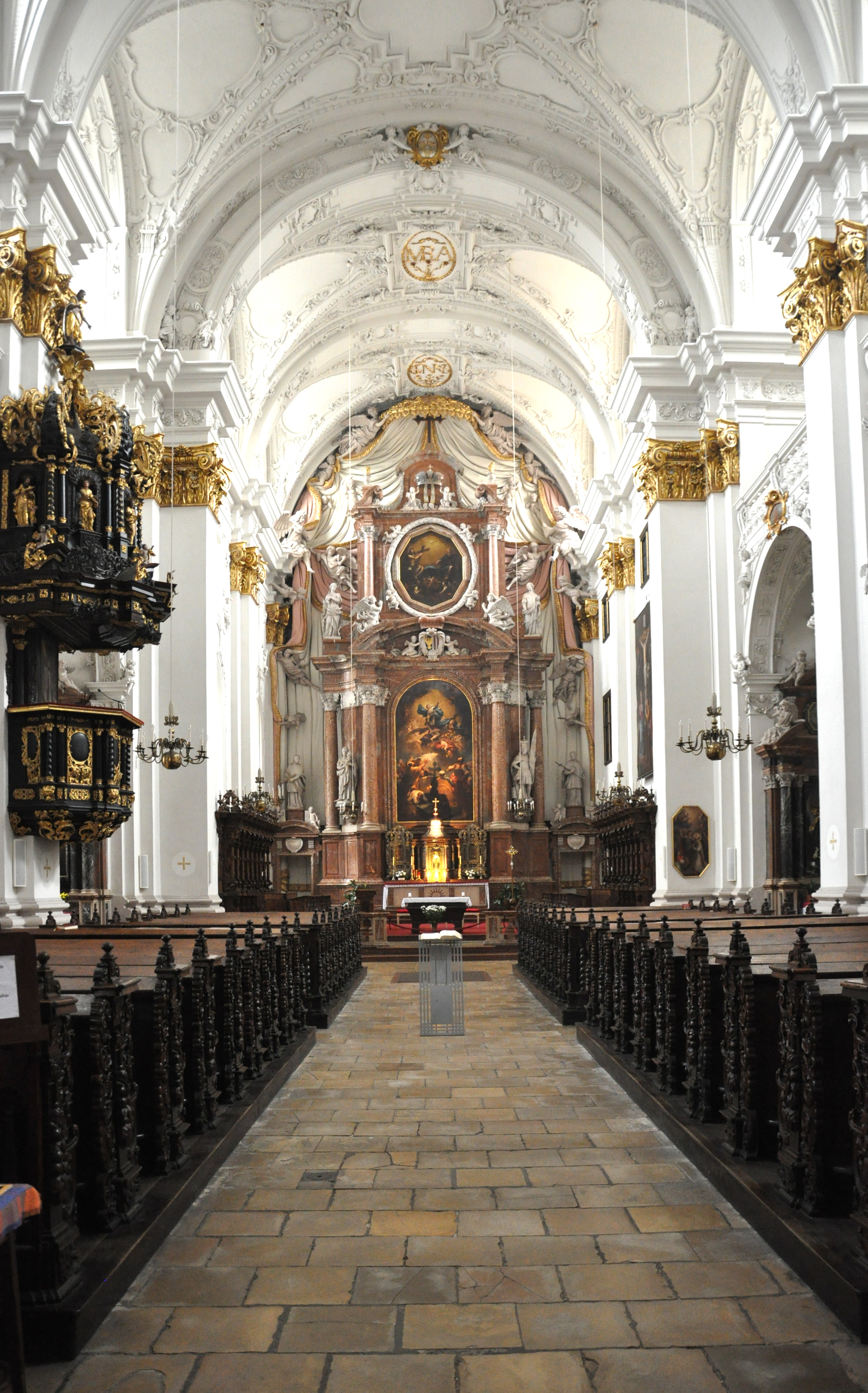
Interior, Old Cathedral, Linz

- All three Equals were first performed at Linz cathedral, 2 November 1812
- Nos. 1 & 3 were played at Beethoven's funeral on 29 March 1827, alternating with the choral arrangements by Ignaz Seyfried.
- No. 2 was sung at the dedication of Beethoven's headstone on 26 March 1828, in the choral arrangement by Seyfried of Franz Grillparzer's poem.
- The first performance in England was probably 70 years later, at W. E. Gladstone's funeral at Westminster Abbey on 28 May 1898, (Note: Two newsreel cameras (one from Pathé News) captured the cortège arriving at Westminster Abbey in 1898.) by the London Trombone Quartet, at the suggestion of their alto player, George Case. The four trombone players—two altos, a tenor and a bass—were stationed in the chantry of Henry V, above the high altar. According to one witness,

The hushed stillness which pervaded the noble fane was broken with indescribable tenderness as the sustained chord of D minor fell upon the ears of the great congregation in tones of weird simplicity and exquisite pathos.

Other music played during the service included arrangements for organ, trombones and timpani.

- The Three Equals were also played at King Edward VII's funeral on May 20, 1910. On both occasions, "musicians agreed that there was nothing more impressive".
- They were performed at the Royal College of Music on 26 March 2001 (the 174th anniversary of Beethoven's death) at an RCM Brass Day by trombone students of Peter Bassano, and a choir of men's voices from RCM and other London conservatories.

== See also ==
- Full score of the Three Equals, WoO 30
- Johannes Kuhlo, founder of the modern brass band movement in Germany
