= Tower music =

Musical performance from the top of a tower

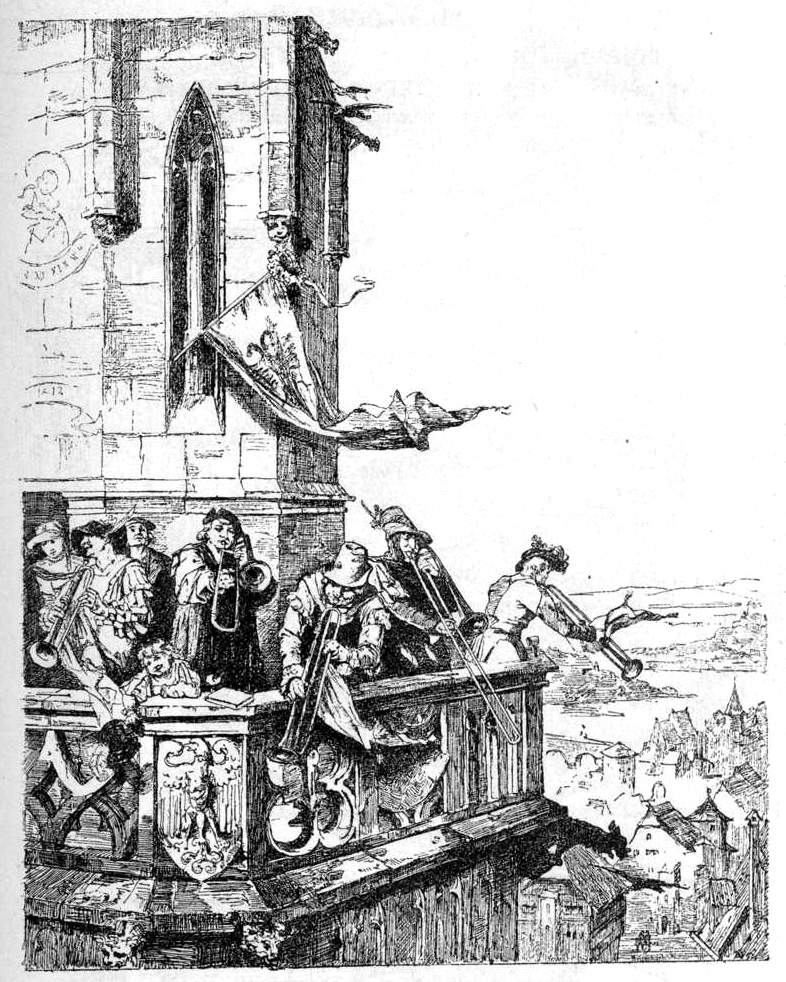
An alta capella playing from a tower.

Weekly tower music of the Tuebingen Collegiate Church
Großer Gott, wir loben dich (EG 331) and Ich ruf zu dir, Herr Jesu Christ (EG 343) played in the weekly Sunday performance from the tower of the Tuebingen Collegiate church (shown in image).

Tower music is a musical performance from the top of a tower. It can also designate the music composed for or played in such a performance.

In the early European Middle Ages, musical instruments on towers were used to warn of danger and mark the passage of time. At first this was done by a tower watchman, later by ensembles of instrumentalists employed by the city. The music became more choral, and came to by played on specific days of the week, and to mark specific dates (feast days such as Christmas and Easter, for instance). The practice largely died out in the late 19th century, but was revived in the early twentieth, and continues to this day. Modern tower music is often played by volunteers.

The tower used would often be a church tower, but the tower or balcony of a civic building might also be used.

The instruments had to be audible to someone not on the tower. This eliminated the quieter (basse) instruments, leaving the louder (haut) instruments. Apart from bells, natural trumpets, slide trumpets, trombones, shawms, bagpipes, and drums were used.

Music was written specifically to be played from towers, but other works could also be used. Alta capella musicians playing the tower music would generally also perform in processions and ground-level outdoor events, and in some cases would also perform (on different instruments) indoors.

== History ==
Many English cities in the 1500s had town waits, as did rich individuals and institutions. In 1571, London ordered its waits to play "upon their instruments upon the turret at the Royal Exchange every Sunday and holiday toward the evening", (with winter break, between September and late March, excepted). These may have been London's first regularly scheduled public concerts. London's waits also played from its walls.

These civic wind bands of town pipers had been a feature of larger German towns and cities since well before the beginning of the sixteenth century, similar to the employment of waits with their sackbuts and shawms in England. Martin Luther, one of the chief figures of the Reformation, encouraged music-making in the service of God, and by around 1570 town councils were employing musicians specifically to take part in church services to supplement the organ playing.

One of the most popular forms of outdoors public music-making in the 17th century in Germany and central Europe was tower music (German: Turmmusik), organised by the town piper (Stadtpfeifer) or tower master (Turmmeister). He and his band of musicians, also called Stadtpfeifer (the German plural is the same as the singular) played music for loud and penetrating wind or brass instruments from church towers and town hall balconies. (Note: The term 'tower master' seems to have been applied to various jobs. One was as the musical director of town or city music, such as Glöggl in Linz, and e.g. the theatre director Franz Pokorny (1797–1850) in Pressburg (Bratislava). Bohuslav Martinu's father, a sexton and town watchman lived in the church tower in Polička as the Turmmeister, but in e.g. Cologne they seem to have been a type of civic constable or magistrate with arresting powers c1530 or one competent to examine midwives c1650.)

Generations of the Bach family in Erfurt filled the office of Stadtpfeifer or Ratsmusiker (German: 'town council musician'). By 1600 Halle, Dresden, Berlin, Cologne, Stettin, Nordhausen and even Eisenach (J. S. Bach's birthplace) with only 6,000 inhabitants, all had Stadpfeifers, whose job it was to sound the hours (Stundenblasen) in the days before striking clocks were common in towers and churches. They started around 3 or 4 o'clock in the morning to start the working day, sounded (German: blasen, lit. 'blew') the mid-morning break around 10 o'clock (Latin: decima hora) and the afternoon break around three or four o'clock in the afternoon. Finally, at around 9 or 10 o'clock, there was an Abendsegen, or evening blessing. Well known pieces by and for Stadtpfeifer include Johann Schein's Banchetto musicale (1617) and Samuel Scheidt's Ludi Musici (1621).

In Nuremberg and Leipzig and there was a particular penchant for antiphonal tower music: three verses of a hymn would be echoed back and forth three times between the bands stationed in the towers of the Neukirche, St. Thomas Church and St. Nicholas Church, Leipzig. The Leipzig Stadtpfeifer and tower master ('Turmmeister') of the St. Nicholas Church from 1669 was Johann Pezel (or Petzold, etc.) whose Hora decima musicorum Lipsiensium ('Leipzig 10 o'clock music') was published the following year, as well as Fünff-stimmigte blasende Music (1685) with five-part intradas and dance pieces for brass instruments. Another Leipzig Stadtpfeifer and virtuoso trumpet player Gottfried Reiche (1667–1734) described tower music in his preface to Vier und zwanzig Neue Quatricinia (1696) for cornett and three trombones, as "a sign of joy and peace", an embodiment of the spiritual-cultural life of the city "certainly whenever the whole country is in mourning, or in war, or when other misfortune is to be lamented." (Note: "Und so, wie Gottfried Reiche im Turmblasen „ein Freuden und Friedens-Zeichen“ sieht, da „wo solche Musik muss eingestellet werden, gewiss ein Land-Trauern, Krieg oder sonst ein Unglück zu beweinen ist“, so könnte die Turmmusik als ein solches „Freuden- und Friedens-Zeichen“ auch das geistig-kulturelle Leben unserer Stadt wesentlich bereichern.)

Although the revival of music in churches was a particularly Lutheran initiative, Catholic areas like Vienna and Salzburg were just as keen to promote tower music. Among the most popular of tunes were the Heilig-Leider, paraphrases in German of the Sanctus from the Latin Mass, which came into fashion after the enlightened reforms of the Holy Roman Emperor Joseph I promoted the use of the vernacular in church services. According to one Stadtpfeifer named Hornbock, quoted in Johann Kuhnau's Quack-Salber: "We know from experience that when our city pipers in the festive season play a religious song with nothing but trombones from the tower, then we are greatly moved, and imagine that we hear the angels singing.".

In Austria, trombones were typically played from church towers (German Turmblasen, lit 'tower blowing') or in cemeteries on All Souls' Day and the previous day (Hallowe'en in England). Their use is mentioned in a handbook explaining the multitude of church music regulations, Kirchenmusik-Ordnung (1828), by the Linz Stadtpfeifer Franz Glöggl. (Note: A review of the book shows how useful the book was in gathering together and explaining the many rules concerning music at church services. "There appears an explanatory guide of musical worship, according to the existing church music-order for all functions occurring on Sundays, festivals, vespers, litanies, masses, funerals, processions etc. while chants, songs for the congregation, motets, introiten, versicles, graduals, offertories, responses etc. It explains the ritual-texts from the measurement book and Breviarium, and is found at a very cheap price. In all countries where Roman Catholic worship prevails, through its essential usefulness of numerous sales, where the lack of such a reliable signpost has been felt for a long time: until the present moment when—wonderfully enough—under the supervision of some well-informed experts—the simple expedient of this book has been devised.) Glöggl commissioned the Three Equals from Beethoven in 1812. They were both pupils of Johann Albrechtsberger (d. 1807), who wrote one of the first trombone concertos.

Tower music reached a peak in around 1750, and thereafter declined towards the end of the 18th century. From around 1800 official civic concerts began to replace those given by the nobility, and what has been termed "Saint Culture" ('St.-Kultur') suffered a split, leading on one side to the growth of professional symphony orchestras, and on the other to amateur Stadtkapellen conducted by professional or semi-professional town music directors.

Modern tower music is common in German-speaking areas.

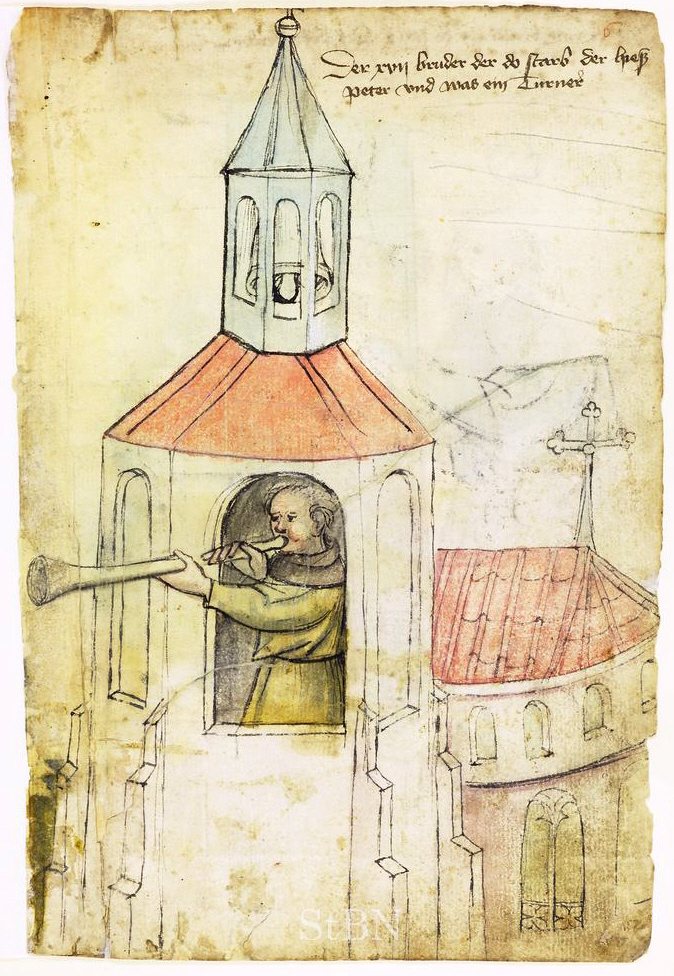
A c. 1425 picture showing a "Turner" (Türmer, in modern German) named Peter.

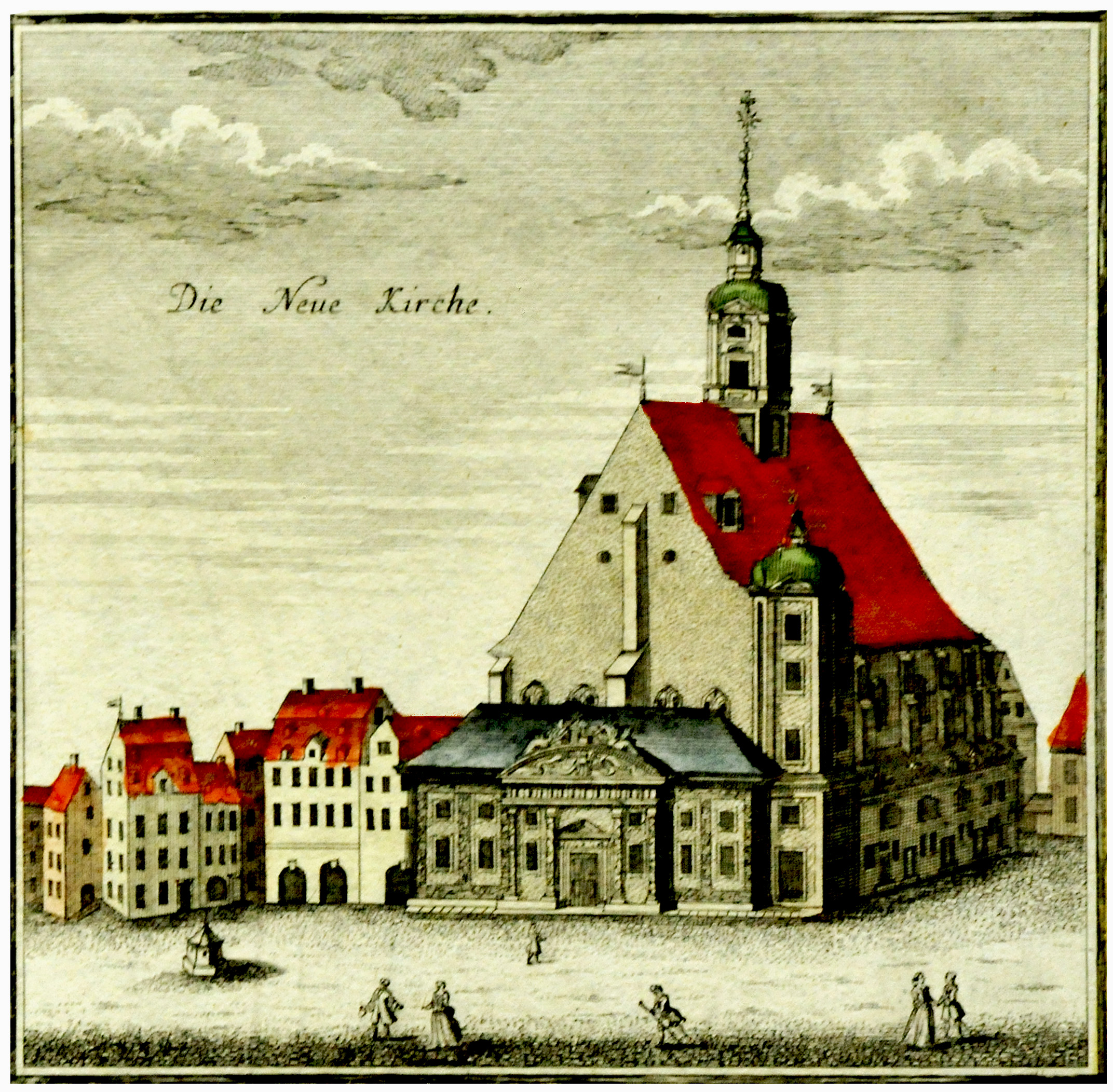
The Neukirche (New Church), Leipzig in 1749

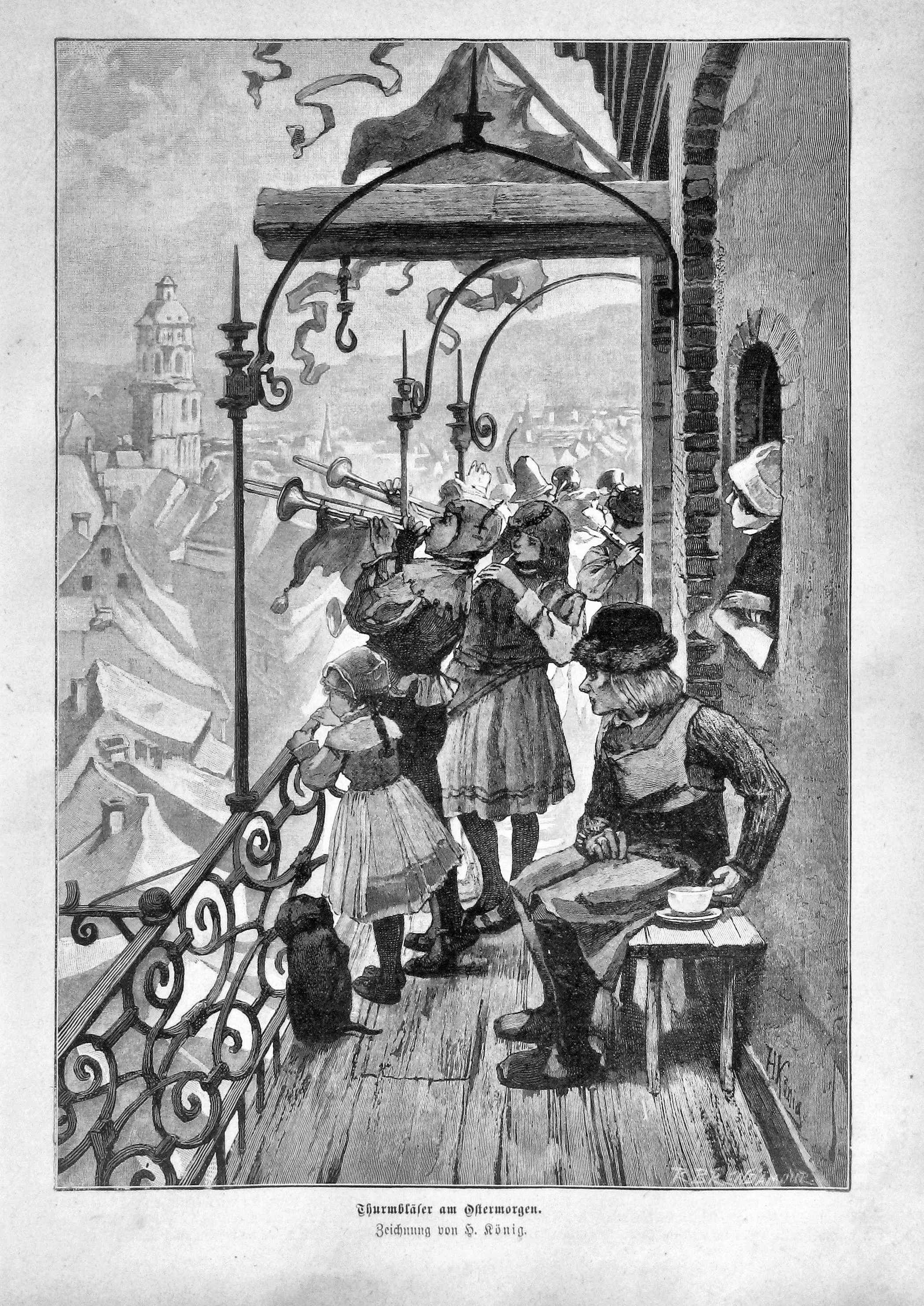
Tower music on Easter morning, 1890 illustration

== Musical pieces ==
=== Pieces named "tower music" ===
- Turmmusiken und Suiten by Johann Pezel (1639–1694), tower music portion scored for two cornets and three trombones (scan of public-domain publication, public-domain scores, and related works)
- Tower Music, composition by Václav Nelhýbel
- Tower Music (Richard Drakeford)

=== Pieces written as tower music ===
- "Drei Equale für vier Posaunen" ("Three Aequales for four Trombones"), by Ludwig van Beethoven

== See also ==
- Aequale, a form of music played from a tower on All Souls' Day and its eve
- Alta cappella outdoor musical group
- Carillon, musical bells often played from a tower
- Hejnał Mariacki, a traditional tower music of Kraków
- Three Equals for four trombones, WoO 30#Town pipers

== Sources ==
- Bassano, Peter (n.d.) [2001?]. "God's Trombones". Translations by Howard Weiner and Matthias Feile. British Trombone Society.
- "Drei Equale für vier Posaunen: Revisionsbericht". Ludwig van Beethovens Werke, Serie 25. Supplement, Nr.310 (in German). Leipzig: Breitkopf & Härtel. 1888.
- Collins, Timothy A. (April 2000). "'Of the Differences between Trumpeters and City Tower Musicians.' The Relationship of Stadtpfeifer and Kammeradschaft Trumpeters". The Galpin Society Journal. 53. Galpin Society: 51–59. doi:10.2307/842316. JSTOR 842316. (subscription needed)
- Collins, Timothy A. (2002). "'Hora Decima': the musical theology of the 'Stadtpfeifer'" (PDF). CrossAccent. 10 (3). Association of Lutheran Church Musicians.
- Glöggl, Franz Xaver (1828). Kirchenmusik-Ordnung: Erklärendes Handbuch des musikalischen Gottesdienstes, fur Kapellmeister, Regenschori, Sänger und Tonkünstler. ('Church Music Regulations - An explanatory handbook for musical church services, music directors, choir directors, singers and composers'). (in German). Vienna: J. B. Wallishauser.
- Herbert, Trevor (2006). The Trombone. London: Yale University Press. ISBN 0300100957.
- Henke, Rudolf Maria; Winkler, Gerhard (2002). Geschichte des Buchandels in Linz (PDF) (in German). Archiv der Stadt Linz.
- Spitzer, Michael (2017). Beethoven. Routledge. ISBN 9781351574297.
- Suppan, Wolfgang (2006). "Stadtpfeifer". Oesterreichisches Musiklexikon. Volume 5, Online edition (in German). Vienna: Verlag der Österreichischen Akademie der Wissenschaften. ISBN 3700130775.
