= Waits =

Waits may refer to:

- Waits (surname)
- Waits, California, former name of Oildale, California
- Waits River, in Vermont
- WAITS, time-sharing operating system

== See also ==
- Wait (musician)
- Wates (disambiguation)
