= Equale =

Composition for equal voices

Page 1 of "Drei Equale für vier Posaunen" ("Three Aequales for four Trombones") by Ludwig van Beethoven

An equale or aequale (from Latin: voces aequales, equal voices or parts) is a musical idiom. It is a piece for equal voices or instruments. In the 18th century the equale became established as a generic term for short, chordal pieces for trombone choirs, usually quartets or trios. The instruments were not necessarily equal in pitch, but formed a closed consort.

== Commemoration of the dead ==
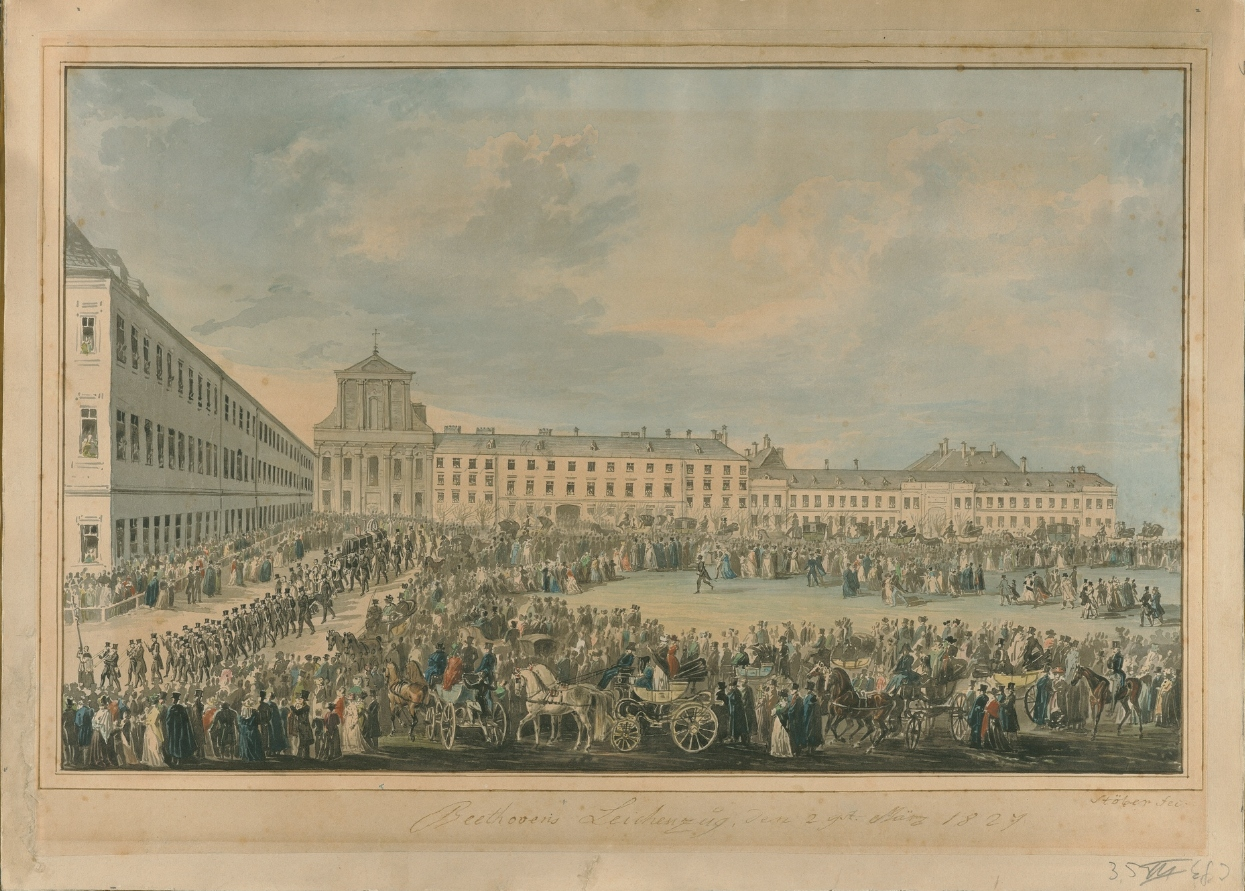
Beethoven's funeral procession, led by a processional cross and four trombonists and sixteen singers performing Seyfried's voice arrangement of his Equali

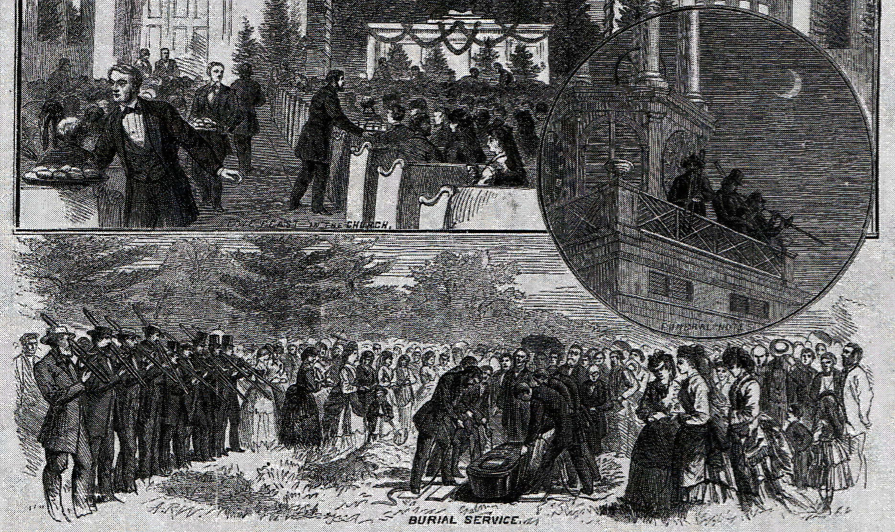
Trombones announcing a death from the belfry and playing at a Moravian funeral in Bethlehem, Pennsylvania, 1874

Aequales were conventionally used in Austria to commemorate the dead. They were performed from towers on All Souls' Day (2 November), and on the previous evening. They were also performed at funerals.

While aequales might be played by other instruments, the sound of trombones was thought to be especially solemn and noble. Trombones had also already acquired an association with death and the afterlife. Finally, the theological symbolism of the trombone, representing divine presence, the voice of the angels, and the instrument of judgment, was thereby underscored.

== Examples ==
Notable examples of the genre are the three Equali for four trombones of Ludwig van Beethoven (Drei Equale, WoO 30), written for Franz Xaver Glöggl and performed in Linz Cathedral on All Souls' Day (2 November), 1812. Two of them were later performed, with the addition by Ignaz von Seyfried of words from the Miserere, at Beethoven's own funeral in 1827. They were also played as instrumental pieces at the funeral of William Gladstone in Westminster Abbey in 1898.

The two Aequali in C minor of Anton Bruckner date from 1847 and are for three trombones. Three years earlier, in 1844, the little-known Wenzel Lambel (1788–1861) of Linz had published ten equali for three or four trombones. Stravinsky scored In memoriam Dylan Thomas, his setting of "Do not go gentle into that good night", for tenor, string quartet and four trombones, which may be an "echo" of the tradition.

There is a passage of Aequale music in the coda of the finale of the sixth ("tragic") symphony of Gustav Mahler, given in counterpoint to four trombones and bass tuba (bars 790–816). Clarinets, bassoons and French horns provide a partial chordal accompaniment. This passage leads directly into the closing bars of the symphony.
