= Two Aequali (Bruckner) =

1847 works composed by Anton Bruckner

- Motets by Anton Bruckner
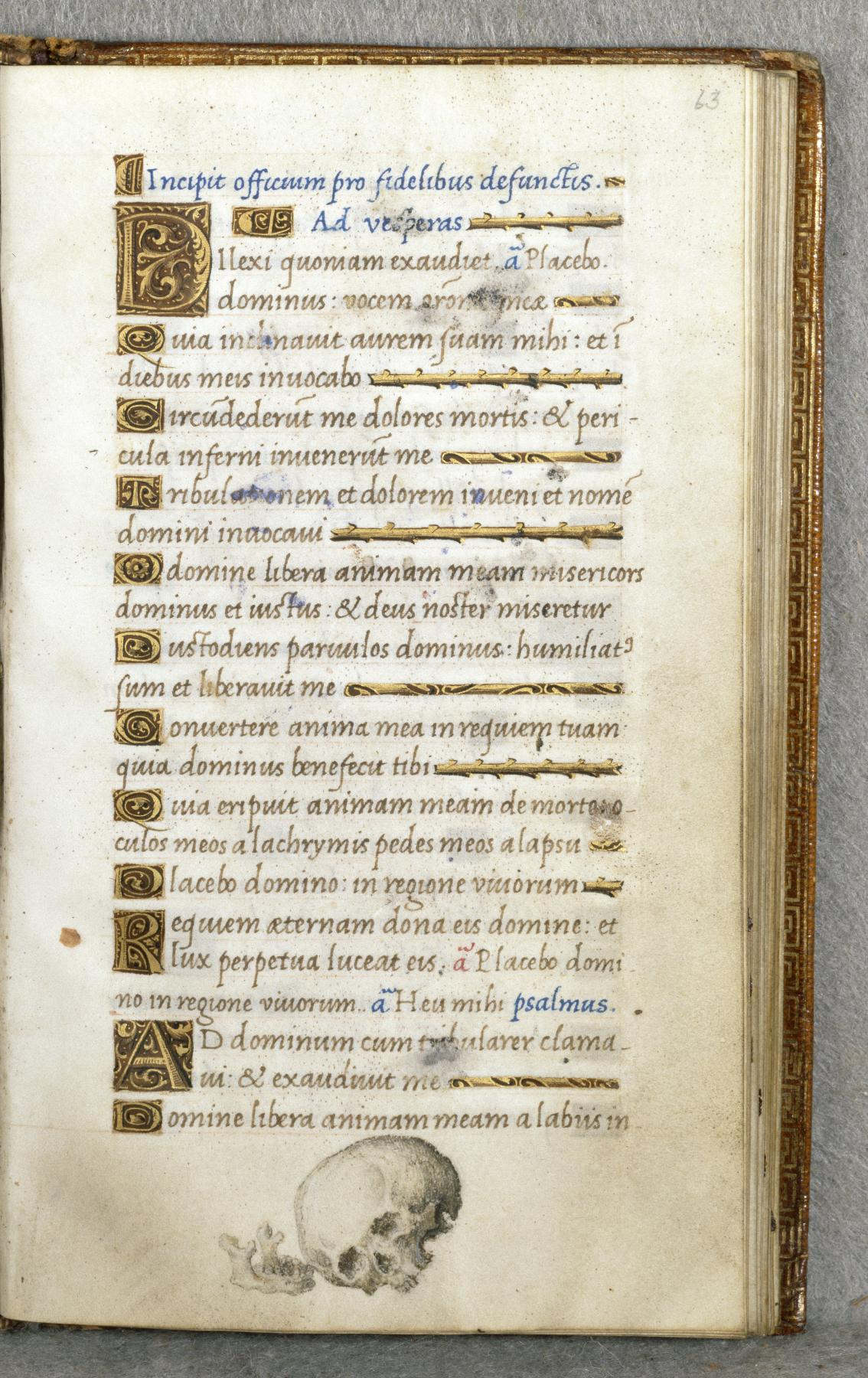
- Incipit officium pro fidelibus defunctis Book of hours
- Key: C minor
- Catalogue: WAB 114 & 149
- Form: Aequale
- Composed: January 1847: St. Florian Abbey
- Dedication: Funeral of Rosalia Mayrhofer
- Scoring: 3 trombones (alto, tenor, bass)

The Two Aequali, WAB 114 & WAB 149, were composed by Anton Bruckner in 1847.

== History ==
Bruckner composed the two Aequali in end January 1847 during his stay in St. Florian Abbey. He composed them for the funeral of his aunt Rosalia Mayrhofer (1770–1847).

The manuscript of the first Aequale (WAB 114) is stored in the archive of the Seitenstetten Abbey. The work was first published in band II/2, p. 83 of the Göllerich/Auer biography.

The sketch of the second Aequale was retrieved later in the archive of the St. Florian Abbey. In the sketch the part of the bass trombone is missing. It was then put as addendum (WAB 149) to the already issued WAB classification.

The two Aequali are issued in Band XXI/14 of the Gesamtausgabe.

== Music ==
The two Aequali in C minor, with 34 and 27 bars, respectively, are score for alto, tenor and bass trombones. In the edition of the Gesamtausgabe the missing part of the bass trombone of the second Aequale has been completed by Hans Bauernfeind.

The works are choral-sized with in WAB 114 a typical folklike melody in sixths. Similar musical sets were later used in the so-called Choräle in Bruckner's later symphonies.

== Selected discography ==
Bruckner's two Aequali are popular pieces for trombone ensembles and are also often put as additional pieces to recordings of choral works.

The first recording occurred in 1970:

- Members of the Berliner Posaunenquartett, Trombone Equale – LP: CBS SOCL 285 (only Aequale No. 1)

A selection among the about 50 recordings:

- Matthew Best, Corydon Singers, English Chamber Orchestra Wind Ensemble, Mass in E minor; Libera me; Zwei Aequale – CD: Hyperion CDA66177, 1986
- Philippe Herreweghe, la Chapelle Royale/Collegium Vocale, Ensemble Musique Oblique, Bruckner: Messe en mi mineur; Motets – CD: Harmonia Mundi France HMC 901322, 1989
- Simon Halsey, CBSO Wind Ensemble & Chorus, Mass in E minor (No. 2) / Motets – CD: Conifer CDCF 192, 1990
- Robert Shewan, Roberts Wesleyan College Chorale & Brass Ensemble, Choral Works of Anton Bruckner – CD: Albany TROY 063, 1991
- Triton Posaunenquartett, German Music for Trombones – CD: Bis 500644, 1993
- Jonathan Brown, Ealing Abbey Choir, Anton Bruckner: Sacred Motets – CD: Herald HAVPCD 213, 1997
- Hans-Christoph Rademann, NDR Chor Hamburg, Anton Bruckner: Ave Maria – CD: Carus 83.151, 2000
- Erwin Ortner, Arnold Schoenberg Chor, Anton Bruckner: Tantum ergo – CD: ASC Edition 3, issue of the choir, 2008
- Wiener Posaunenquartett, Bach & Bruckner - CD: Schagerl Records, 2009
- Duncan Ferguson, Choir of St. Mary's Cathedral of Edinburgh, Bruckner: Motets – CD: Delphian Records DCD34071, 2010
- Nigel Short, Tenebrae, Brahms & Bruckner Motets – CD: Signums Classics SIGCD430, 2015

Some recordings use completions of the score of the bass trombone of the second Aequale, that are not based on that by Hans Bauernfeind. According to Hans Roelofs, the best recording is that by Halsey. Other excellent recordings are those by Best, Herreweghe, Ortner, Rademann and Short.

== See also ==
- Aequale
- Drei Equale für vier Posaunen, by Beethoven

== Sources ==
- Uwe Harten, Anton Bruckner. Ein Handbuch. Residenz Verlag, Salzburg, 1996. ISBN 3-7017-1030-9.
- August Göllerich, Anton Bruckner. Ein Lebens- und Schaffens-Bild, c. 1922 – posthumous edited by Max Auer by G. Bosse, Regensburg, 1932
- Anton Bruckner – Sämtliche Werke, Band XXI: Kleine Kirchenmusikwerke, Musikwissenschaftlicher Verlag der Internationalen Bruckner-Gesellschaft, Hans Bauernfeind and Leopold Nowak (Editor), Vienna, 1984/2001
- Cornelis van Zwol, Anton Bruckner 1824–1896 – Leven en werken, uitg. Thoth, Bussum, Netherlands, 2012. ISBN 978-90-6868-590-9
