= Waits (surname) =

Waits is a surname. Notable people with the surname include:

- Alvin Waits (1920-1976), American politician from Missouri
- Freddie Waits (1943–1989), American musician
- Nasheet Waits (born 1971), American jazz drummer
- Rick Waits (born 1952), American baseball player
- Tom Waits (born 1949), American singer
