= Wates =

Wates may refer to:

- Wates, Kulon Progo, Indonesia
  - Wates railway station
- Wates Group, a UK construction company
- Cyril G. Wates (1883–1946), Canadian astronomer, climber and writer
- Darren Wates (born 1977), Australian cricketer

== See also ==
- Waits (disambiguation)
