= Alvin Waits =

American politician

Member of the U.S. House of Representatives from Missouri's 35th district

Missouri House of Representatives
- Incumbent
- Assumed office 1967

Personal details
- Born: 1920 Triplett, Missouri, US
- Died: 1976 (aged 55–56)
- Party: Democratic
- Spouse: Charlotte Jean Chalfant
- Children: 3
- Occupation: service station owner

Alvin E. Waits (June 9, 1920 – 1976) was an American Democratic politician who served in the Missouri House of Representatives. He was born in Triplett, Missouri, and was educated at Meadville High School and Fairfax Aviation School in Kansas City, Kansas. On July 4, 1942, he married Charlotte Jean Chalfant in Excelsior Springs, Missouri. Waits served in the Army Air Corps during World War II, between 1942 and 1946.
