= Franz Xaver Glöggl =

Austrian musician and choir director

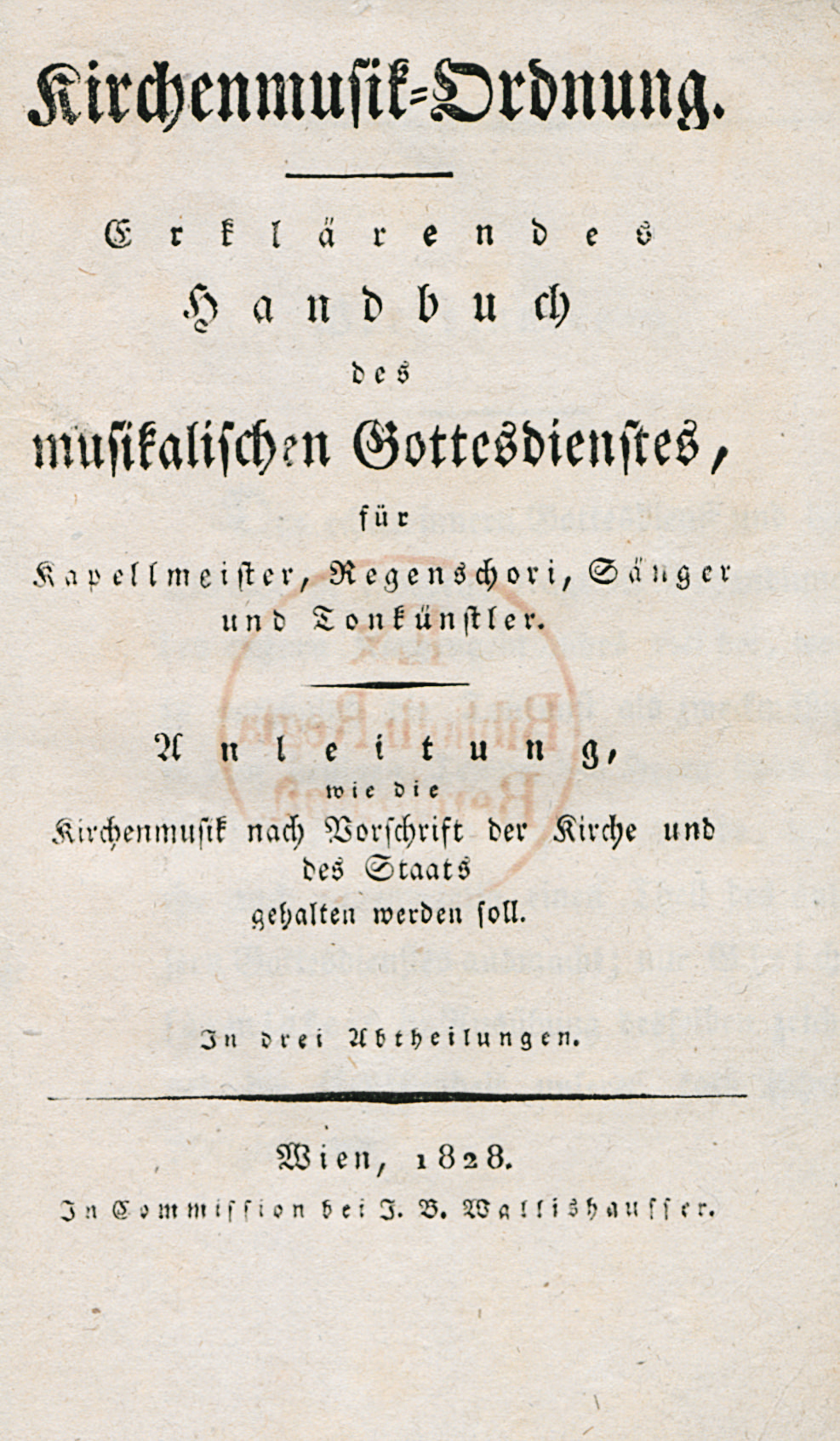
- Title-page of the Kirchenmusik-Ordnung, Vienna, 1828
- Born: 21 February 1764; Linz, Archduchy of Austria
- Died: 16 June or 16 July 1839; Linz, Austrian Empire
- Occupations: Kapellmeister; Stadtthurnermeister; theatrical producer; music dealer

Franz Xaver Glöggl (21 February 1764 – 16 June or July 1839) was an Austrian musician and musical entrepreneur. He was appointed Kapellmeister of the Cathedral of Linz in about 1797. He was an important figure in the cultural life of Linz. He corresponded with Haydn, Mozart and Georg Joseph Vogler, and was a friend of Beethoven.

== Life ==
Glöggl was born on 21 February 1764 in Linz, which at that time was in the Archduchy of Austria. He was the son of the Austrian musician, composer and conductor Johann Joseph Glöggl.

The younger Glöggl was a musician at the Stadtpfarrkirche of Linz from 1780 to 1783. Between 1784 and 1786 he was in Vienna, where he studied violin under Anton Hofmann and trombone with Clemens Messerer. From 1787 he was director of the theatre orchestra of Linz, and in 1790 he took over his father's position as Stadtthurnermeister, director of the tower music of the city of Linz. He was appointed Kapellmeister of the Old Cathedral of Linz in 1797 or 1798. The violinist Karl Holz, who later played in the Schuppanzigh Quartet and became a friend and personal secretary to Beethoven, studied under Glöggl in Linz.

Glöggl was active as a theatrical producer in Linz and in Salzburg. He ran a shop which dealt in art and music items; Tobias Haslinger, who later became a friend of Beethoven and published much of his music, worked there.

From 1812, Glöggl published a musical journal, the Musikalische Zeitung für die österreichischen Staaten.

When Beethoven visited Linz in the autumn of 1812, he visited and became friends with Glöggl. Beethoven asked if he could hear an equale, the characteristic funeral trombone music genre of Linz, and Glöggl arranged a performance at his house. Glöggl asked him for a six-part equale, to include the unusual soprano and quart trombones that he owned. Beethoven wrote for him the Drei Equale für vier posaunen (WoO 30), which are for alto, tenor and bass trombones and do not call for the soprano or quart instruments.

Glöggl's collection of musical instruments and manuscripts was acquired in 1824 by the Gesellschaft der Musikfreunde in Vienna, and formed the basis of what may be the oldest surviving institutional musical instrument collection, the Sammlung alter Musikinstrumente, which since 1938 has been held in trust by the Viennese Kunsthistorisches Museum.

Glöggl died in Linz on either 16 June or 16 July 1839.

== Books ==
His published work includes:

- Versuch zu einem musikalischen Kunstwörterbuch. Linz: Franz Xaver Rhomberg, 1798
- Musikalischer Hauptzirkel in Kupfer mit Erklärung. Linz: Franz Xaver Glöggl, 1810
- Allgemeines musikalisches Lexikon, oder Encyclopädisches Wörterbuch der Tonkunst: aus den bewährtesten Schriftstellern gesammelt, nach selben bearbeitet und alphabetisch geordnet. Linz: Franz Xaver Glöggl, 1812
- Allgemeine Anfangs-Gründe der Tonkunst nebst einem kleinen musikalischen Wörterbuche. Offenbach am Main: J. André, 1814
- Der musikalische Gottesdienst: Eine Abhandlung für Kapellmeister, Chorregenten, Kirchensänger und Tonkünstler. Linz: Quandt, 1822
- Kirchenmusik-Ordnung: Erklärendes Handbuch des musikalischen Gottesdienstes, für Kapellmeister, Regenschori, Sänger und Tonkünstler; Anleitung, wie die Kirchenmusik nach Vorschrift der Kirche und des Staats gehalten werden soll; in drei Abtheilungen. Wien: Wallishausser, 1828
