= Alta cappella =

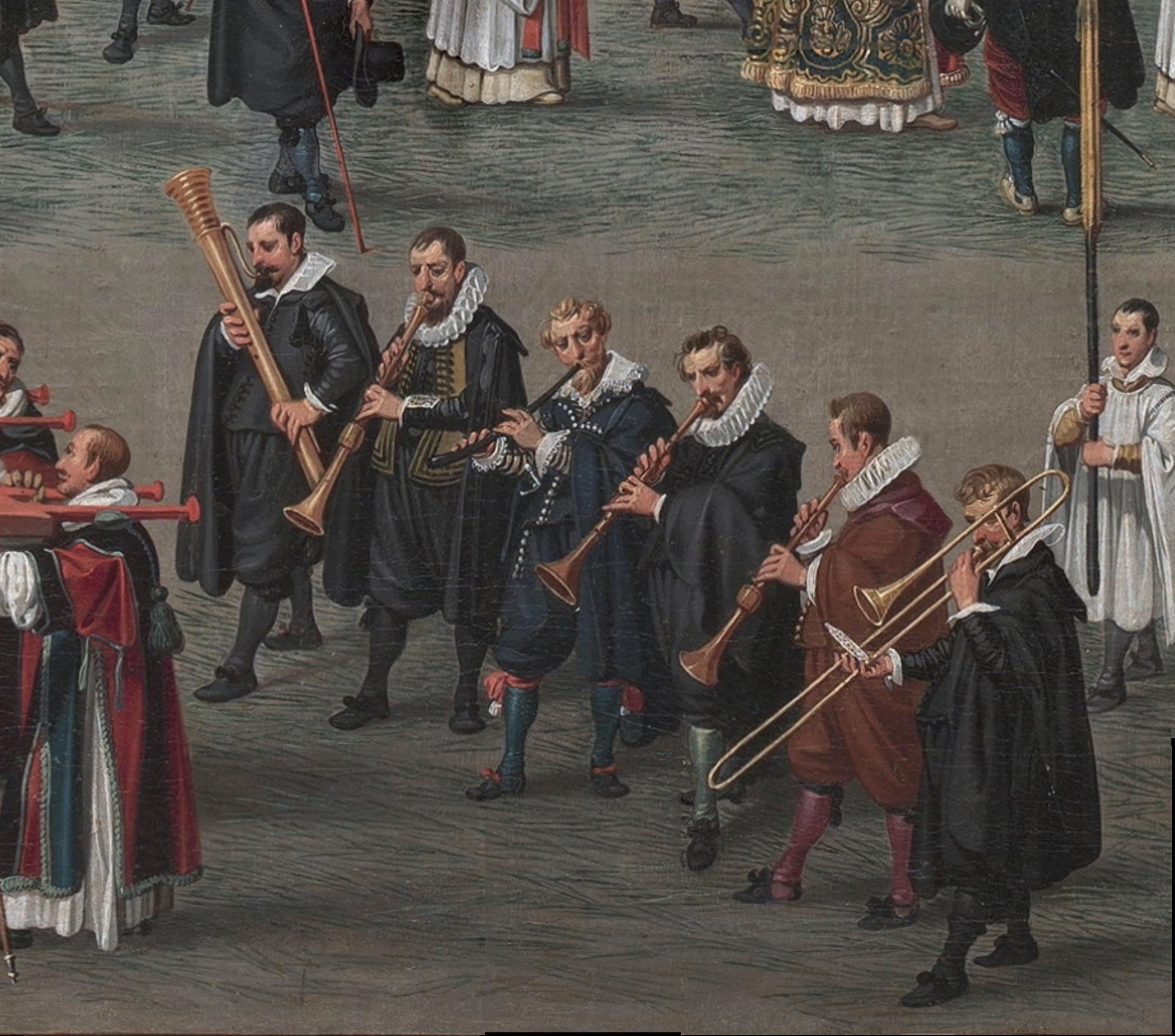
Early 17th-century Flemish alta cappella, drawing by Denis van Alsloot. Instruments are (from left to right): a bass dulcian, an alto shawm, a treble cornett, a soprano shawm, a second alto shawm and a tenor sackbut.

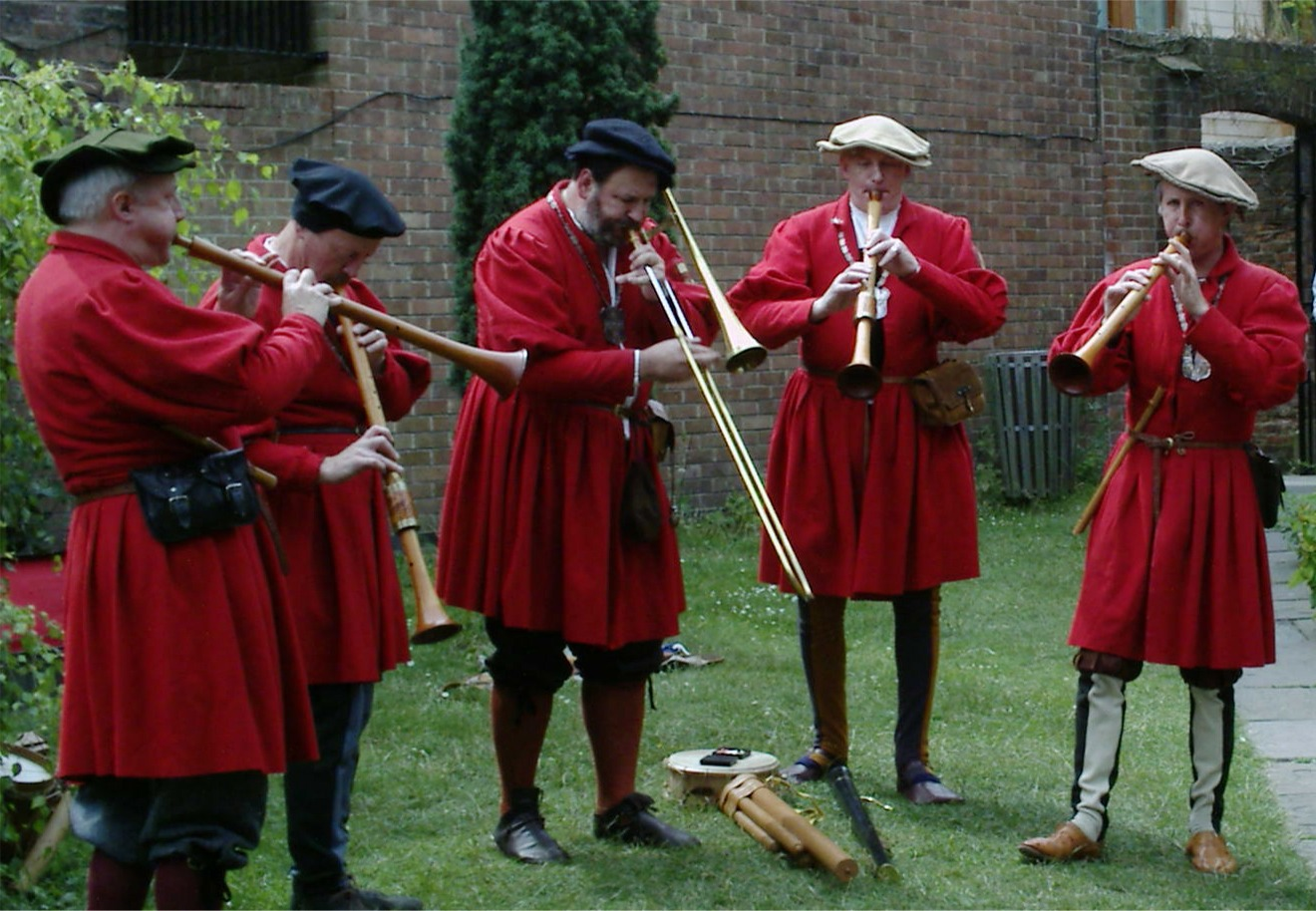
A re-created wait in York

An alta cappella or alta musica (Italian), haute musique (French) or just alta was a kind of town wind band found throughout continental Europe from the thirteenth to the eighteenth centuries, which typically consisted of shawms and slide trumpets or sackbuts. Waits is the British equivalent. These were not found anywhere outside of Europe.

== History ==
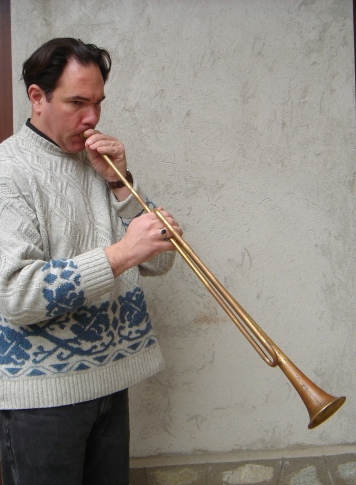
Modern reconstruction of a fifteenth-century slide trumpet

Alta musique in general refers to the "loud music" of instruments like shawms, sackbuts, trumpets, and drums, in contrast to basse musique, the "soft music" of recorders, viols, fiddles, harps, psalteries, and the like. These ensembles first appeared in Europe in the thirteenth century, taken from the ceremonial loud bands of the Arab World, consisting of small shawms, nakers, and other percussion, together with pairs of straight trumpets functioning as something of a cross between drone and percussion. In Europe, these instruments were sometimes augmented by bagpipes and pipe and tabor.

By the fifteenth century, these bands had come mainly to consist of three musicians, two playing shawms and the other a slide trumpet or (later) sackbut, but in the sixteenth century the size gradually increased and the instrumentation became more varied. After about 1500 in Germany, the alta developed into the kind of band that came to be known as Stadtpfeifer (town pipers).

Many English cities in the 1500s had town waits, as did rich individuals and institutions. In 1571, London ordered its waits to play "upon their instruments upon the turret at the Royal Exchange every Sunday and holiday toward the evening" (with winter break, between September and late March, excepted). These may have been London's first regularly scheduled public concerts.

Present-day descendants of this tradition are the Catalan cobla bands, who play music for sardana dancers, and which feature a modern version of the shawm with melodies traditionally played by the tenor member of the family. In addition, in the same Catalonia, specially in Tarragona area, the use of a shorten shawm called "gralla" is used for the human tower "castells" and "cercavila", an event that takes place in the streets, always festive parade, which involved a variety of elements and Town Hall representatives, including musical (grallers), audio (fireworks) and visual type (giants, dwarfs, costumes, representations of animals or mythological beings or invented, etc.).

== Repertoire ==
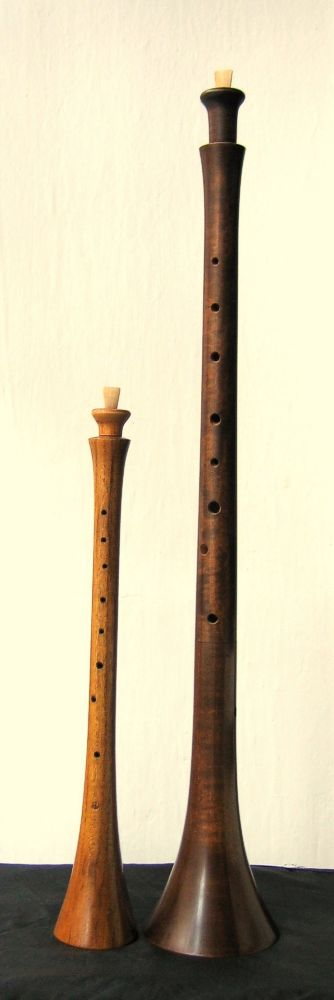
Two shawms of the fifteenth-century type

There is one surviving composition from the late-fifteenth or early sixteenth century actually titled Alta. It is an untexted piece for three (presumably instrumental) voices by Francisco de la Torre, in the Spanish manuscript Cancionero de Palacio (E-Mp 2–1–5), and is assumed to be a typical example of the improvisatory style of this ensemble. It sets the popular basse danse tenor La Spagna in long notes with a contratenor in more or less note-against-note motion and a highly decorated fast-moving upper part. Similar cantus-firmus settings from this period, mostly in three parts and in improvisatory style, may also be associated with these bands. Examples include pieces found in MS Trent 87,5 such as Auxce bon youre, Tandernaken, and the setting of the basse danse melody, Je suy povere de leesse. During the sixteenth century, cantus firmus settings gave way to other kind of dances, sometimes improvised and sometimes composed. Music in four parts had become a normal texture by the early sixteenth century, and the bands accordingly increased in size.
