= Ignaz von Seyfried =

Austrian musician (1776–1841)

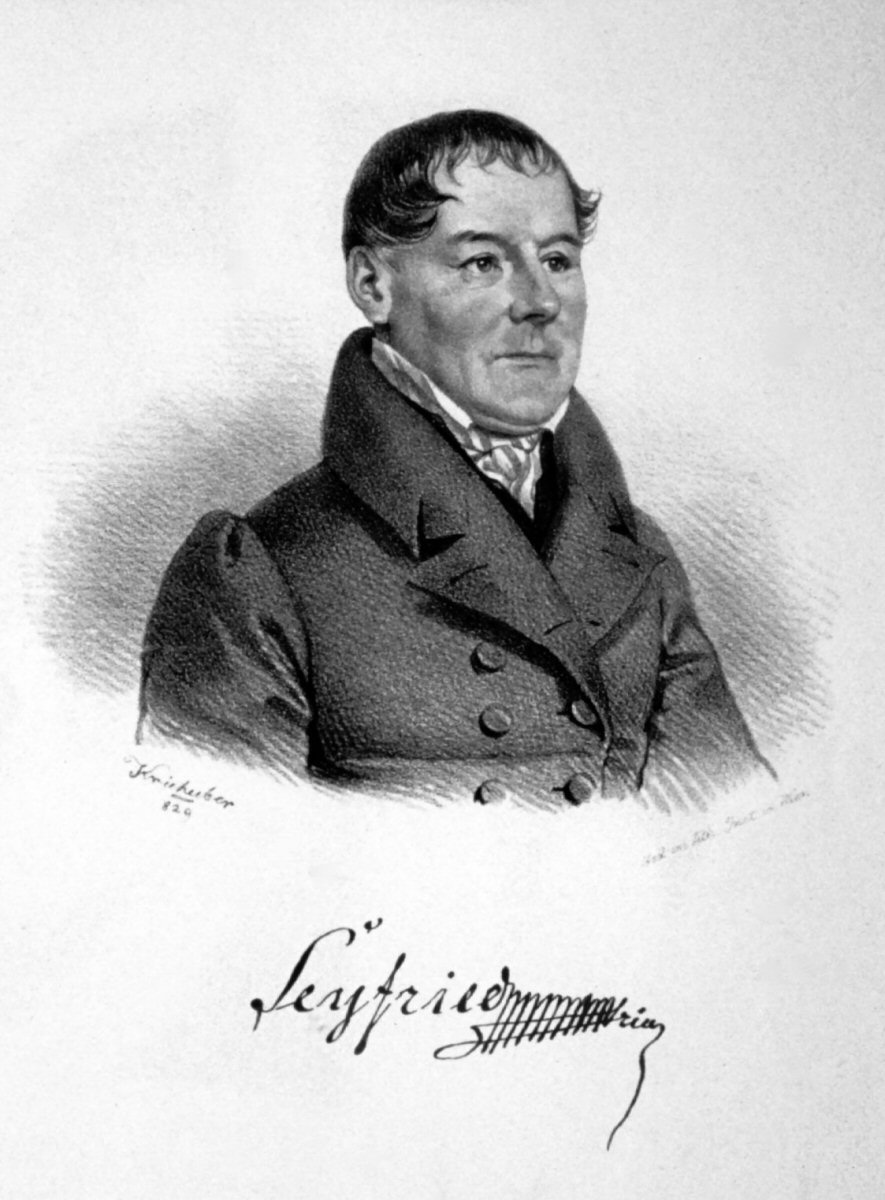
Ignaz von Seyfried. 1829 lithograph by Josef Kriehuber

Ignaz Xaver Ritter von Seyfried (15 August 1776 – 26/27 August 1841) was an Austrian musician, conductor and composer. He was born and died in Vienna. According to a statement in his handwritten memoirs he was a pupil of both Wolfgang Amadeus Mozart and Johann Georg Albrechtsberger. He edited Albrechtsberger's complete written works after his death, published by Tobias Haslinger. His own pupils included Franz von Suppé, Heinrich Wilhelm Ernst, Antonio Casimir Cartellieri, Joseph Fischhof and Eduard Marxsen who would later teach Johannes Brahms.

== As conductor ==
In his youth Seyfried served as the assistant conductor for Emanuel Schikaneder's opera troupe at the Theater auf der Wieden in Vienna, becoming musical director in 1797 and serving (in its new building, the Theater an der Wien) until 1826. His memoirs offer accounts of the first production, under Schikaneder's auspices, of Mozart's The Magic Flute, as well as a curious anecdote concerning the composer's death a few weeks later; see Death of Mozart.

In 1805, Seyfried conducted the première of the original version of Beethoven's Fidelio. Seyfried's memoirs also include some striking tales about Beethoven, and the information he provides on Beethoven in the appendix to Studien im Generalbasse are "of great biographical value", containing "everything [that] is known about the circumstances of the adored master and (are) authentic fact". Also see Piano Concerto No. 3 (Beethoven) and Choral Fantasy (Beethoven).

== As composer ==
Seyfried composed a large amount of music from 1797 to the end of his life, including overtures and incidental music for stage plays and Singspiele, operas, ballets and melodramas; numerous sacred works – 10 masses including one for double choir, motets, requiems, psalms, hymns and oratorios; as well as two symphonies, cantatas, overtures and chamber music. Other works include concertantes for clarinet and oboe; a Konzertstück and concertante for waldhorn, and 10 serenades for four waldhorns. A list of his works in a biography dating from 1836 fills five pages.

Of his musical works, the Grove Dictionary says: "his versatility won him a unique place in Vienna's musical life; however, almost none of his music is marked by real originality or distinction."

== As arranger ==
He made arrangements of Beethoven's Three Equals for four trombones, WoO 30, for four-part men's chorus, performed at Beethoven's funeral; re-scored Michael Haydn's Deutsche Messe, for men's voices only; and arranged over twenty operas by others for various wind band combinations.

He also made two "Grandes Fantaisies" for orchestra, based on material from Mozart: one in C minor, built from Mozart's Fantasia K. 475 and the Piano Sonata K. 457, and the other in F minor, built from Mozart's Piano Quartet K. 478 and "Ein Orgel Stück für eine Uhr" K. 608.
