= Pietro Aron =

Italian composer

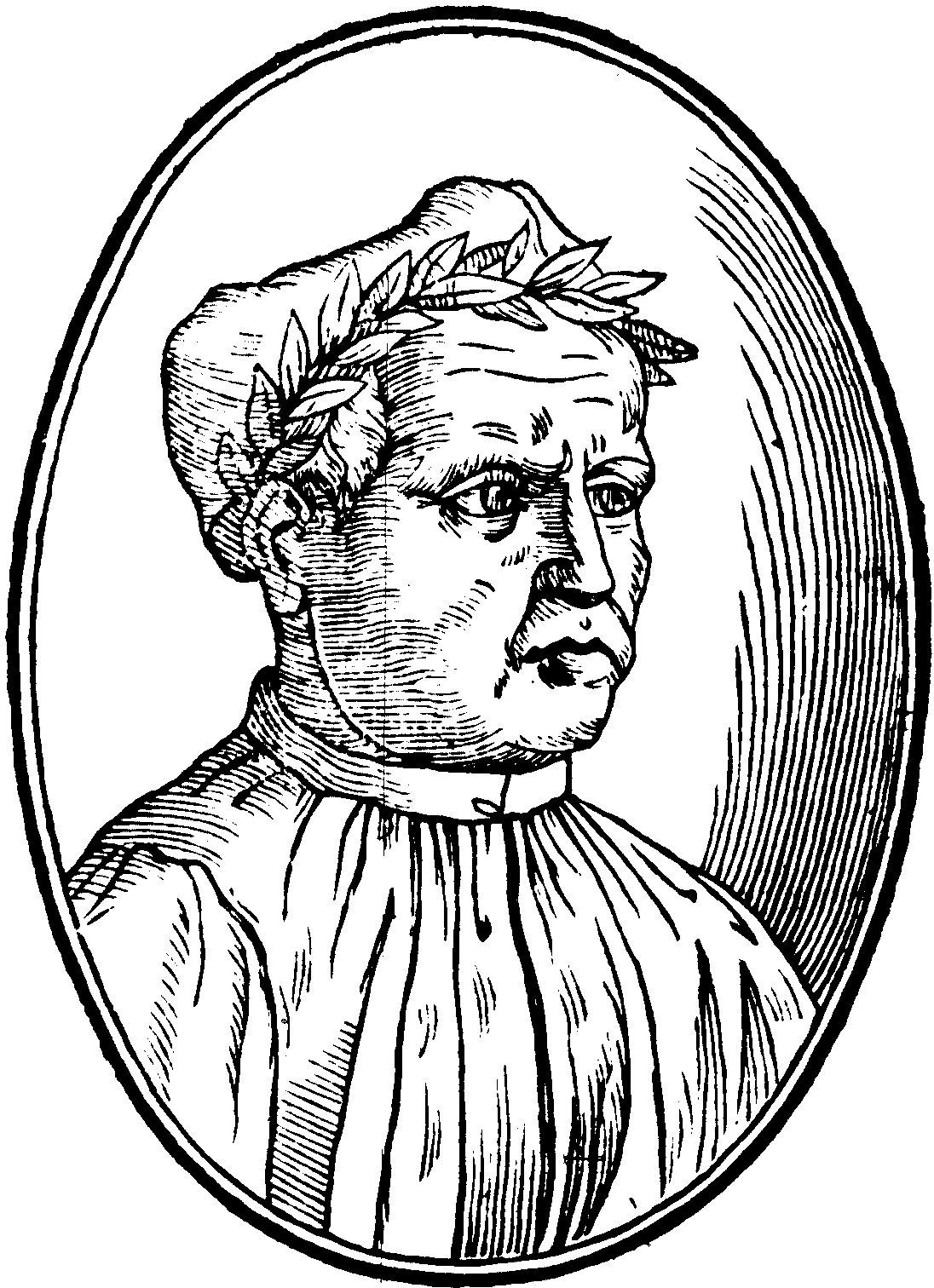
Aron in 1545

Pietro Aron, also known as Pietro (or Piero) Aaron (c. 1480 – after 1545), was an Italian music theorist and composer. He was born in Florence and probably died in Bergamo (other sources state Florence or Venice).

== Biography ==
Very little is known about Aron's early life but at least one source claims he may have been Jewish. He was educated in Italy. Aron was a self-taught musician. He claimed in his Toscanello in musica (1523) that he had been friends with Obrecht, Josquin, and Heinrich Isaac in Florence. If true, the time frame would have been most likely in 1487. Between 1515 and 1522, he was Church Cantor at the Cathedral of Imola. In 1516 he became a priest there. In February 1523 Aron went to Venice and became cantor of Rimini Cathedral, where he worked for Sebastiano Michiel, who was Grand Prior of the Knights of St. John of Jerusalem. In 1525, he was "maestro di casa" in a Venetian house. In 1536, after the death of Michiel, he joined a monastery in Bergamo where he remained until his death.

Aron is known for his treatises on the contrapuntal practice of the period. His earliest treatise, De institutione harmonica, on counterpoint, is written in Italian even though most scholarly writings of the time are in Latin. In Thoscanello de la musica (later Toscanello in musica), he was the first to observe the change from linear writing to vertical: this was the first period in music history where composers began to become conscious of chords and the flow of harmony. Aron included tables of four-voice chords, the beginning of the trend which was to result in functional tonality in the early 17th century. He also discusses tuning, and the book is the first to describe quarter-comma meantone. Other topics covered by Aron include the use of the eight modes, four-voice cadences, and notation of accidentals.

Aron was a friend and frequent correspondent of music theorist Giovanni Spataro. Only Spataro's letters to Aron have survived. Topics discussed by the two include contemporary composers and composition, notation, and especially the use of accidentals.

While Aron was known as a composer and frequently refers to his own works in his writings, only one possible composition of his survives, the doubtfully attributed four-voice frottola, "Io non posso piu durare", from Petrucci's Fifth Book of Frottole (1505). Lost works include a Credo setting in six voices, a five-voice Mass, settings of In illo tempore loquente Jesu, Letatus sum, and Da pacem, and other motets and madrigals.

== Published works ==
- Libri tres de institutione harmonica (Bologna, 1516; this edition on Vicifons)
- Thoscanello de la musica (Venice, 1523; four reprints as Toscanello in musica 1525–1562)
- Trattato della natura et cognitione di tutti gli tuoni di canto figurato (Venice, 1525; partially reproduced and retranslated into English in 1950 in Otto Strunk's Source Readings in Music History, N.Y.)
- Lucidario in musica di alcune opinione antiche e moderne (Venice, 1545)
- Compendiolo di molti dubbi, segreti, et sentenze intorno al canto fermo et figurato (Milan, n.d., probably posthumous, as the title page bears the inscription: "In memoria eterna erit Aron")
