= Wait (musician) =

British town pipers

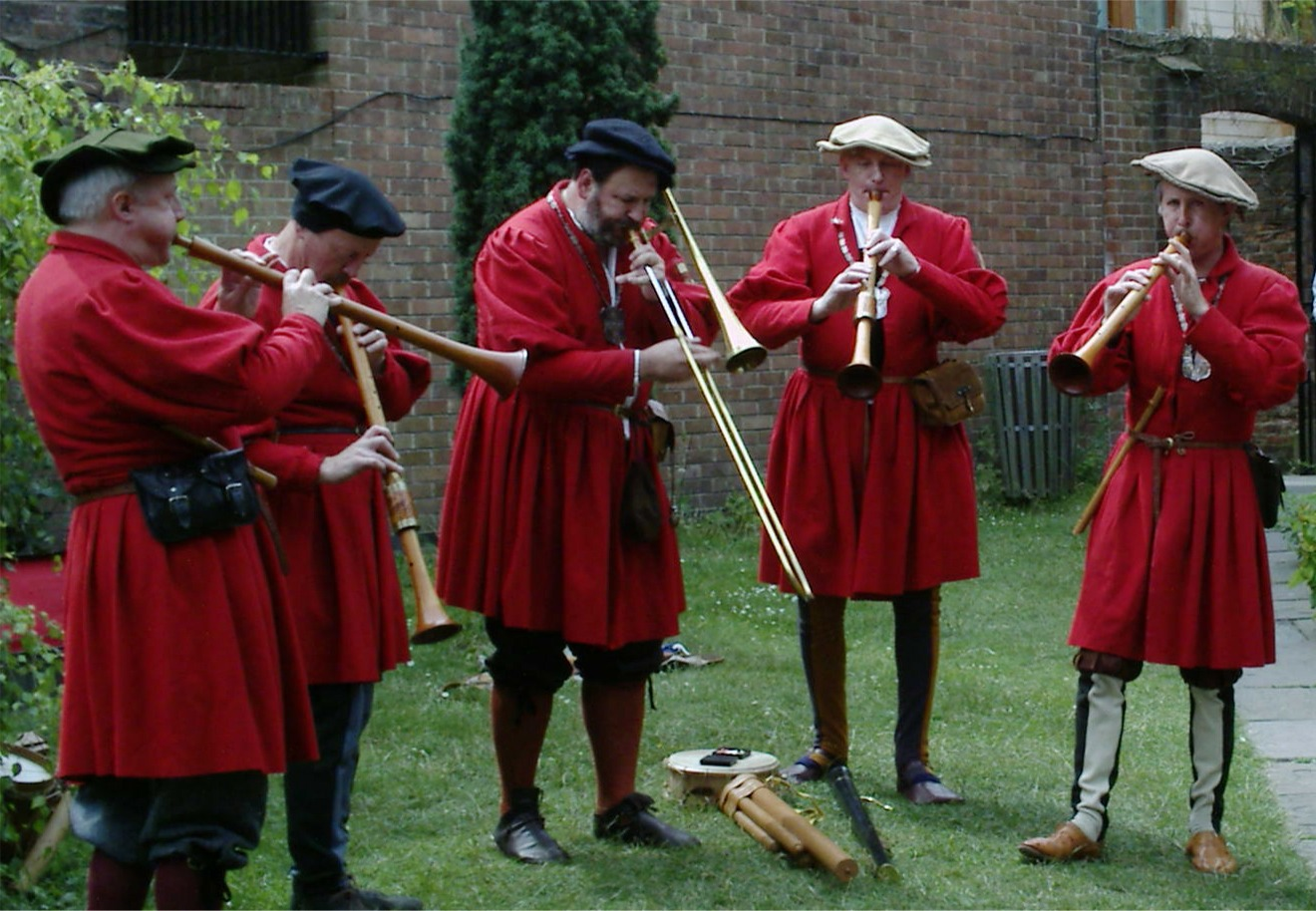
A band of modern-day waits

From medieval times up to the early 19th century, every British town and city of any note had a band of waites (modern spelling waits or waitts). Their duties varied from time to time and place to place, but included playing their musical instruments through the town at night, waking the townsfolk on dark winter mornings by playing under their windows, welcoming royal visitors by playing at the town gates, and leading the mayor's procession on civic occasions. These musical bands were often attired in colourful liveries and, in some cases, wore silver chains.

Most continental European countries had their equivalents of waits. In the Netherlands, they were called stadspijpers; in Germany, Stadtpfeifer; and in Italy, pifferi.

== History ==
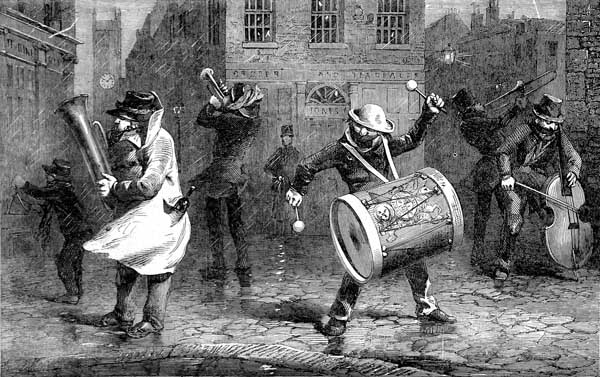
Henry George Hine's The Waits at Seven Dials (1853) portrays a group of "Christmas waits"

Town waits or city waits were in former times in England and Scotland the watchmen who patrolled during the night, using a musical instrument to show they were on duty and to mark the hours. This simple task later developed as the waits added more instruments and became more proficient at playing them.

Musically-inclined families tended to serve as waits, since this was more easily open to them than other musical occupations. The surnames Waite and Wakeman are derived from individuals who worked as waits. Ferdinando Gibbons was one of the Waits of Cambridge; his sons Edmund, Ellis, and Orlando became notable musicians. Some extant tunes are named after the waits of particular towns and cities; e.g., Chester Waits and London Waits.

The instruments used by waits varied. The usual instrument was the shawm, a loud and piercing wind instrument suited to outdoor playing. Some played string instruments, while some were noted for their singing, as at Norwich. The shawm was so closely associated with waits that it was also known as the wait-pipe.

Waits were provided with salaries, liveries and silver chains of office, bearing the town's coat of arms. They added dignity to ceremonial occasions. From the Middle Ages to the 18th century, town records include transactions concerning waits, upon their appointment and on the provision of cloaks, ribbons, badges, etc. Payments were also made for their instruments, such as hautboys, bass viols, fiddles and bassoons.

The city of York has records of the York Waits as early as 1272. The Norwich Waits are thought to have originated early in the 15th century. The Edinburgh Waits ("tounis minstrels") were employed to play in the morning and evening, and also to give a special concert at noon. When Oliver Cromwell visited the mayor of Newcastle upon Tyne, the town waits played before the mayor's house. Joseph Turnbull (d. 1775) was a player of the Northumbrian smallpipes. A portrait of him survives, in the collection at Alnwick Castle; in this portrait, he is wearing a blue coat, which is known to have been the uniform of the Alnwick Town Waits.

In Elizabethan times, the Court Leet of the manor of Manchester appointed town waits to undertake certain duties, one of which was "playing morning and evening together, according as others have been heretofore accustomed to do". In 1603 they welcomed into their company a more skilful musician, and it was then ordered that "the said waits shall hereafter be received to play music at all and every wedding and dinners in this town".

As a result of the Municipal Corporations Act 1835, waits were abolished, though their name lingered on as Christmas waits, who could be any group of singers or musicians who formed a band in order to sing and play carols for money around their town or village at night over the Christmas period. It is these largely amateur musicians who have today become associated with the name 'waits', rather than the historical civic officers and accomplished musicians who were the original waits.

== See also ==
- List of Christmas carols
