= Johann Georg Albrechtsberger =

Austrian composer (1736–1809)

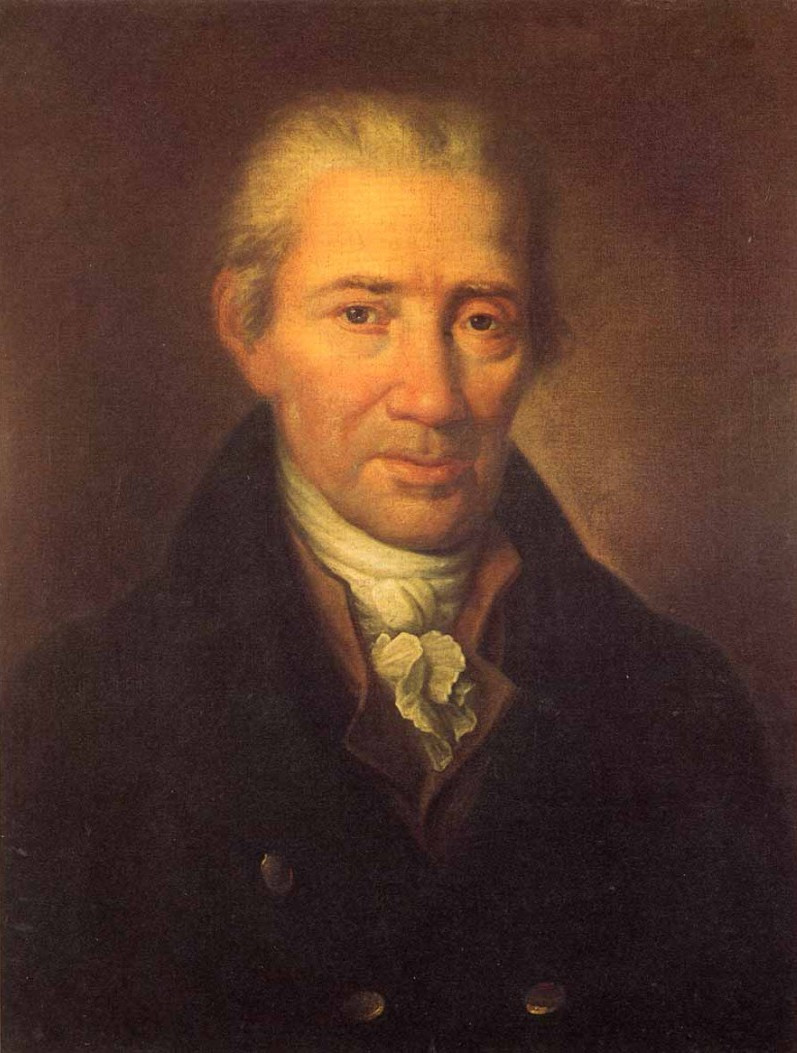
Albrechtsberger; portrait by Leopold Kupelwieser

Johann Georg Albrechtsberger (3 February 1736 – 7 March 1809) was an Austrian composer, organist, and music theorist, widely regarded as one of the leading figures in counterpoint and composition theory during the Classical period. He was a prolific composer of church music, orchestral works, and keyboard pieces, though he is best remembered for his influence as a teacher.

Albrechtsberger was a mentor to several important composers, most notably Ludwig van Beethoven, whom he instructed in counterpoint and fugue. His theoretical writings and pedagogical methods had a lasting impact on 19th-century composition, and his treatises on harmony and counterpoint remain highly regarded. He was also a friend of Haydn and Mozart.

In addition to his teaching contributions, Albrechtsberger held several prestigious positions, including Kapellmeister of St. Stephen's Cathedral in Vienna. He was a composer though his works are little performed today.

== Biography ==
Albrechtsberger was born at Klosterneuburg, near Vienna. He originally studied music at Melk Abbey and philosophy at a Benedictine seminary in Vienna, and became one of the most learned and skillful contrapuntists of his age. Albrechtsberger's earliest classmates included Michael Haydn and Franz Joseph Aumann. After being employed as organist at Raab, Hungary in 1755 and Maria Taferl, Austria in 1757, he was appointed Thurnermeister back at Melk Abbey. In 1772 he was appointed organist to the court of Vienna, and in 1792 Kapellmeister of St. Stephen's Cathedral, Vienna.

His fame as a theorist attracted to him in the Austrian capital a large number of pupils, some of whom afterwards became eminent musicians. Among these were Johann Nepomuk Hummel, Ignaz Moscheles, Josef Weigl, Ludwig-Wilhelm Tepper de Ferguson, Antonio Casimir Cartellieri, Ludwig van Beethoven, Anton Reicha and Franz Xaver Wolfgang Mozart. (See: List of music students by teacher: A to B#Johann Georg Albrechtsberger.) Beethoven had arrived in Vienna in 1792 to study with Joseph Haydn, but quickly became infuriated when his work was not being given attention or corrected. Haydn recommended his friend Albrechtsberger, with whom Beethoven then studied harmony and counterpoint. On completion of his studies, the young student noted, "Patience, diligence, persistence, and sincerity will lead to success", which reflects upon Albrechtsberger's own compositional philosophy.

Albrechtsberger died in Vienna; his grave is in St. Marx cemetery.

== Compositions ==
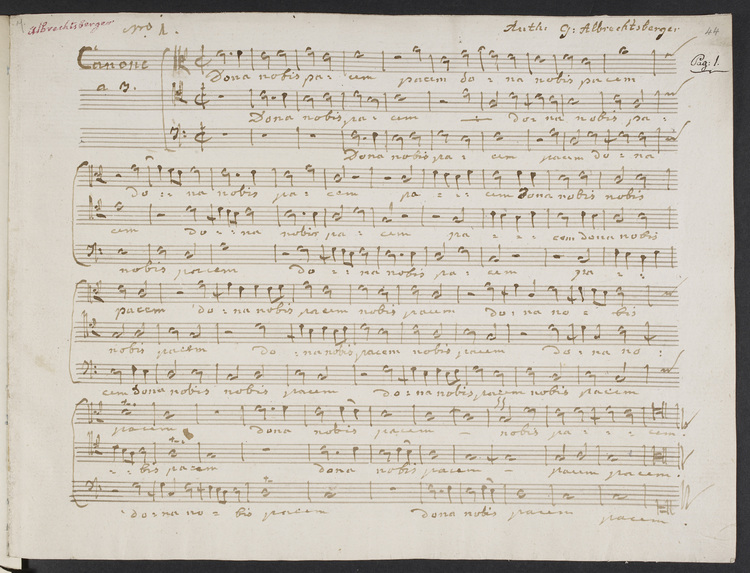
Holograph manuscript of a folio from VII Canoni a piu voci in partitura

His published compositions consist of preludes, fugues and sonatas for the piano and organ, string quartets, etc.; but the greater proportion of his works, vocal and instrumental, exists only in manuscript. They are in the library of the Vienna Gesellschaft der Musikfreunde. Around 1765, he wrote at least seven concerti for Jew's harp and strings (three survive in the Hungarian National Library in Budapest). They are pleasant, well-written works in the galant style.

One of his most notable works is his Concerto for Alto Trombone and Orchestra in B♭ Major (1759). As the trombone has few works dating back to the classical period, his concerto is often highlighted by the trombone community. He also wrote a Concerto for the Mandola, Op. 27, discussed positively in the 1914 book The Guitar and Mandolin.

Possibly the most valuable service he rendered to music was in his theoretical works. In 1790 he published at Leipzig a treatise on composition, of which a third edition appeared in 1821. A collection of his writings on harmony, in three volumes, was published under the care of his pupil Ignaz von Seyfried (1776–1841) in 1826. An English version of this was published by Novello in 1855. His compositional style derives from the counterpoint of Johann Joseph Fux, who was Kapellmeister at St Stephen's Cathedral from 1713 to 1741; Albrechtsberger later held the same position.

A continuous thread can be traced from his teaching through that of his pupil Anton Reicha, who went on to become the first Professor of Counterpoint and Fugue at the Paris Conservatoire from 1818 until his death in 1836, and who in turn reached a wide audience through both his own teaching and his theoretical writings, which were standard reference at the Conservatoire for most of the 19th century, and translated into German by Carl Czerny.
