= Johann Christoph Pezel =

Johann Christoph Pezel (also Petzold; his name is sometimes given in the Latinized form Pecelius) (1639 – 13 October 1694) was a German violinist, trumpeter, and composer.

He lived at Leipzig from 1661 to 1681, with an interruption in 1672, when he entered an Augustinian monastery in Prague, which however he left soon after to become a Protestant. His later years were spent at Bautzen, where (as at Leipzig) he was in municipal employment as Stadtpfeifer and Stadtmusicus. He died in Bautzen, aged 55.

He was renowned as a violinist and clarino trumpet player and published between 1669 and 1686 a considerable number of collections, chiefly of instrumental music, such as Musica vespertina lipsica (1669), Musicalische Seelenerquickungen (1675), Deliciae musicales, oder Lustmusik (1678), Musica curiosa lipsiaca (1686), etc.; also some sacred vocal music and theoretical works. He was influential in the evolution of instrumental forms and the style of orchestral writing.
