= Daniel Lassalle =

French baroque trombonist

Daniel Lassalle is a baroque trombonist from France. He is joint artistic director of Les Sacqueboutiers (with Jean-Pierre Canihac) and professor of trombone at the Conservatoire National de Région de Toulouse.

He won the Premier prix for trombone and also chamber music at the Conservatoire National de Région de Toulouse in 1982 before winning the Premier prix for trombone at the Conservatoire National Supérieur de Musique de Paris in 1984.

As a member of the ensemble 'Les Sacqueboutiers', he has collaborated with Jordi Savall and Hespérion XXI, Michel Corboz and Ensemble Vocal de Genève, Jean-Claude Malgoire and la Grande Ecurie and la Chambre du Roy, Philippe Herreweghe and la Chapelle Royale, William Christie and Les Arts Florissants.

In addition to his professorial posts in Toulouse and Lyon, he advises in early music courses at academies in Urbino, Paris, Barcelona, and La Seu d'Urgell.
