= Les Sacqueboutiers =

- Origin: Toulouse, France
- Genres: Early music, Renaissance, Baroque
- Years active: 1976–present
- Award: Ensemble de l'année – Victoires de la musique classique (2008)
- Website: les-sacqueboutiers.com

Les Sacqueboutiers, formerly Les Saqueboutiers de Toulouse, are French early music wind and brass ensemble founded in 1976 by Jean-Pierre Canihac and Jean-Pierre Mathieu at Toulouse. They play the cornet à bouquin and the sackbut, with other instruments supporting. Artistic direction is conducted by Jean-Pierre Canihac and Daniel Lassalle. In 2008, les Sacqueboutiers were « Ensemble de l'année » at the Victoires de la musique classique.
