= Sackbut =

Early form of trombone from the Renaissance and Baroque periods

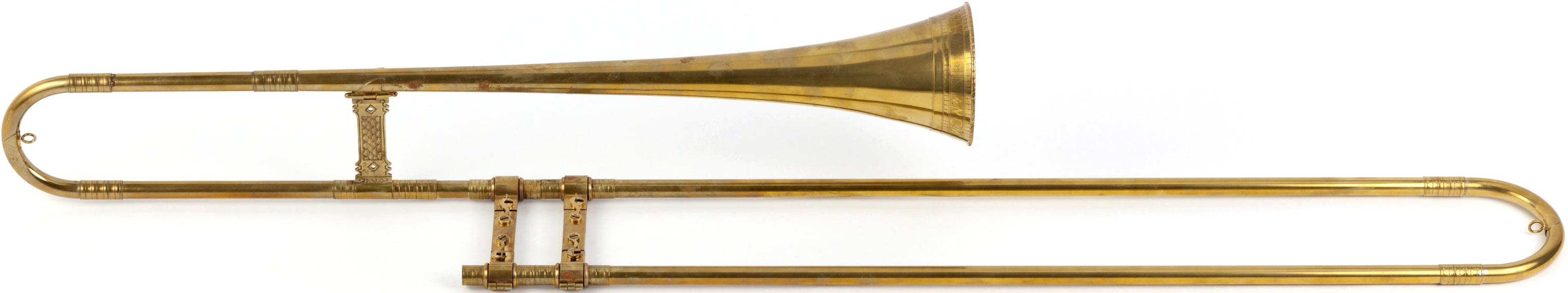
- Renaissance-era tenor sackbut (modern replica)

Brass instrument
- Classification: Wind; Brass; Aerophone
- Hornbostel–Sachs classification: 423.22 (Sliding aerophone sounded by lip vibration)
- Developed: Earliest form of the trombone used in the Renaissance and Baroque periods (mid 15th to early 18th centuries)

Playing range
- Range of the tenor sackbut

Related instruments
- Buccin; Buisine; Clarion; Cornett; Trombone

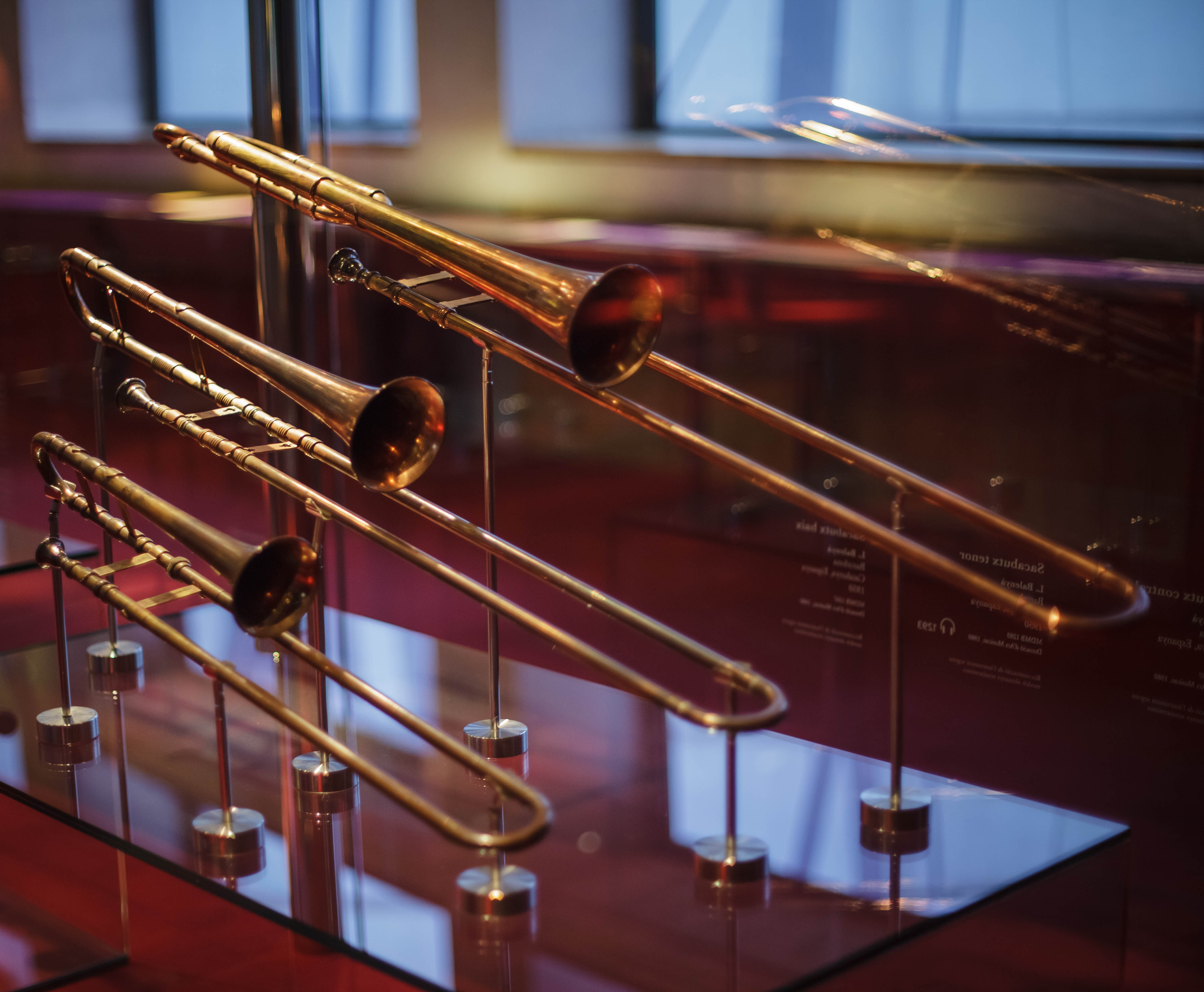
Left to right: replica alto, tenor and bass sackbuts, in Museu de la Música de Barcelona.

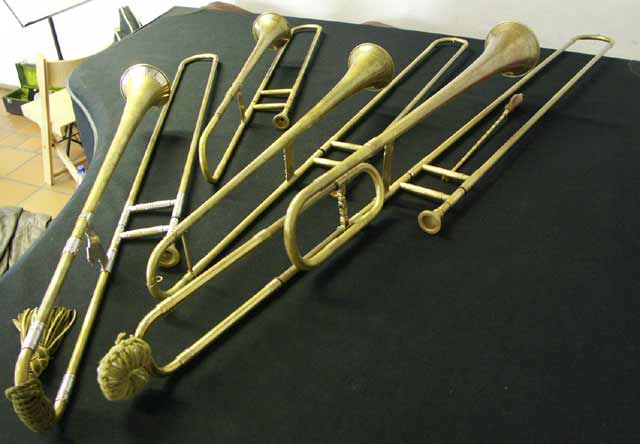
Four sackbuts: two tenors, left & middle; alto, top; bass, right.

A sackbut is an early form of the trombone used during the Renaissance and Baroque eras. A sackbut has the characteristic telescopic slide of a trombone, used to vary the length of the tube to change pitch, but is distinct from later trombones by its smaller, more cylindrically proportioned bore, and its less-flared bell. Unlike the earlier slide trumpet from which it evolved, the sackbut possesses a U-shaped slide with two parallel sliding tubes, rather than just one.

Records of the term trombone predate the term sackbut by two decades, and evidence for the German term Posaune is even older. Sackbut, originally a French term, was used in England until the instrument fell into disuse in the eighteenth century; when the instrument regained popularity in the late eighteenth and early nineteenth centuries the Italian term trombone became dominant. In modern English, an older trombone or a replica is called a sackbut.

The bell section was more resonant, since it did not contain the tuning slide and was loosely stayed rather than firmly braced to itself. This trait and its smaller bore and bell produce a "covered, blended sound which was a timbre particularly effective for working with voices,... zincks and crumhorns", as in an alta cappella.

The revived instrument had changed in specific ways. In the mid-18th century, the bell flare increased, crooks fell out of use, and flat, removable stays were replaced by tubular braces. The new shape produced a stronger sound, suitable for open-air performance in the marching bands where trombones became popular again in the 19th century. Before the early 19th century, most trombone players adjusted their tuning using a crook placed at the joint between the bell and the slide or seldom between the mouthpiece and the slide.", rather than the modern tuning slide on the bell curve, whose cylindrical sections prevent the instrument from flaring smoothly through this section. Older trombones also generally don't have water keys, stockings, a leadpipe, or a slide lock, but as these parts are not critical to sound, replicas may include them. Bore size remained variable, as it still is today.

== Terminological history ==
The first reference to a slide instrument was probably trompette des ménestrels, first found in Burgundy in the 1420s and later in other regions of Europe. The name distinguished the instrument from the trompettes de guerre (war trumpets), which were of fixed length.

"Busaun" (trombone) and various trumpets by different names, from the 1511 treatise by Sebastian Virdung.

The next word to appear in the 15th century that implied a slide was the sackbutt group of words. There are two theories for the sources: it is either derived from the Middle French sacquer (to pull) and bouter (to push) or from the Spanish sacar (to draw or pull) and bucha (a tube or pipe). The term survives in numerous English spelling variations including sacbutt, sackbutte, sagbut, shagbolt, sacabushe, shakbusse and shakbusshe.

Closely related to sackbutt was the name used in France: sacqueboute and in Spain, where it was sacabuche. These terms were used in England and France until the 18th century.

In Scotland in 1538 the slide instrument is referred to as draucht trumpet (drawn trumpet) as opposed to a weir trumpet (war trumpet), which had a fixed length.

In Germany, the original word was Posaune, appearing about 1450 and is still used today. This (as well as bason) derives from busine, which is Latinate and meant straight trumpet.

In Italy it was (and remains) trombone, which derived from trumpet in the Latin tromba or drompten, used in the Low Countries. The first records of it being used are around 1440, but it is not clear whether this was just a nickname for a trumpet player. In 1487 a writer links the words trompone and sacqueboute and mentions the instrument as playing the contratenor part in a danceband.

== History ==
See: Clarion

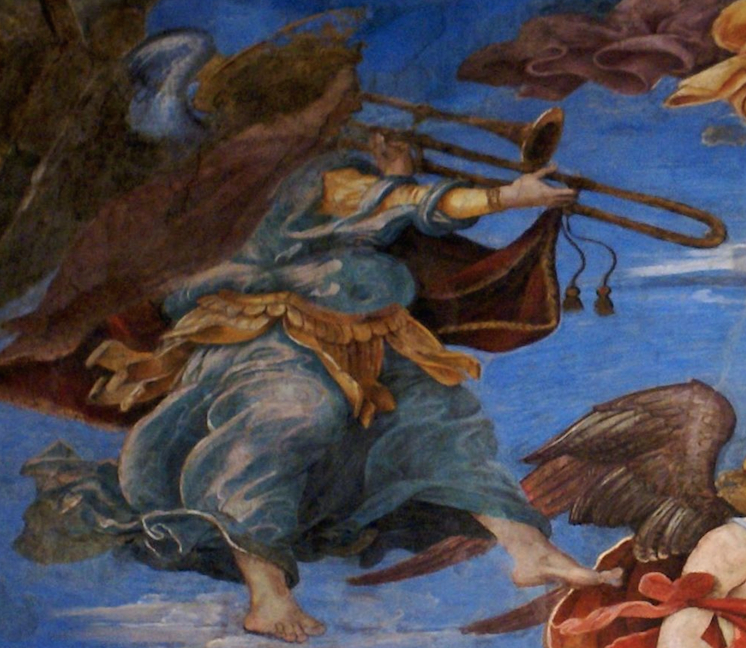
Sackbut in a fresco by Filippino Lippi in Rome, The Assumption of the Virgin, dating from 1488 to 1493. This is the earliest clear evidence of a double-slide instrument.

The trombone developed from the buisine trumpet. Up until 1375 trumpets were simply a long straight tube with a bell flare.

There are various uses of sackbut-like words in translations of the Bible, including the Geneva Bible and King James Bible, due to a faulty translation from the Vulgate; the Latin term in the Vulgate referred to a type of harp.

From 1375 the iconography sees trumpets being made with bends, and some in 'S' shapes. Around 1400 we see the "loop"-shaped trumpet appear in paintings and at some point in the 15th century, a single-tube slide was added. This slide trumpet was known as a "trompette des ménestrels" in the alta cappella bands.

The earliest clear evidence of a U-shaped slide moving on two inner tubes is in a fresco painting by Filippino Lippi in Rome, T he Assumption of the Virgin, dating from 1488 to 1493.

From the 15th to the 19th centuries, the instrument designs changed very little overall, apart from a slight widening of the bell in classical era. Since the 19th century, trombone bore sizes and bells have increased significantly.

It was one of the most important instruments in Baroque polychoral works, along with the cornett and organ.

== Instrument sizes ==
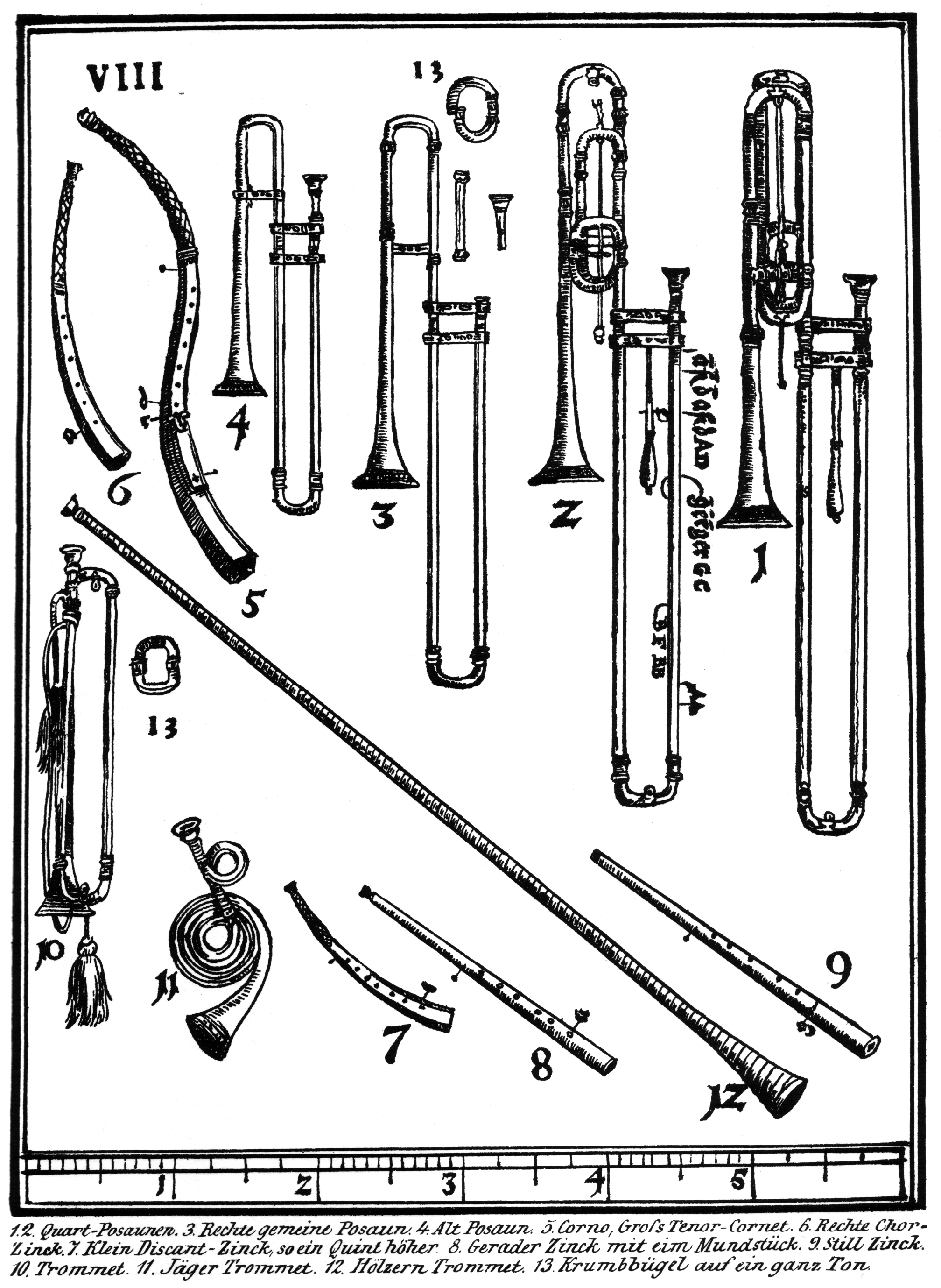
Trombones in Syntagma Musicum (1614–20), by Michael Praetorius.

Sackbuts come in several sizes. According to Michael Praetorius, these were:

Voice	Praetorius' name	Praetorius' pitch	Modern pitch
alto	Alt oder Discant Posaun	E or D	F or E♭
tenor	Gemeine recht Posaun	A	B♭
bass	Quart-Posaun or Quint-Posaun	E and D	F (quart) and E♭ (quint)
double bass	Octav-Posaun	A (octave below tenor)	B♭ (octave below tenor)

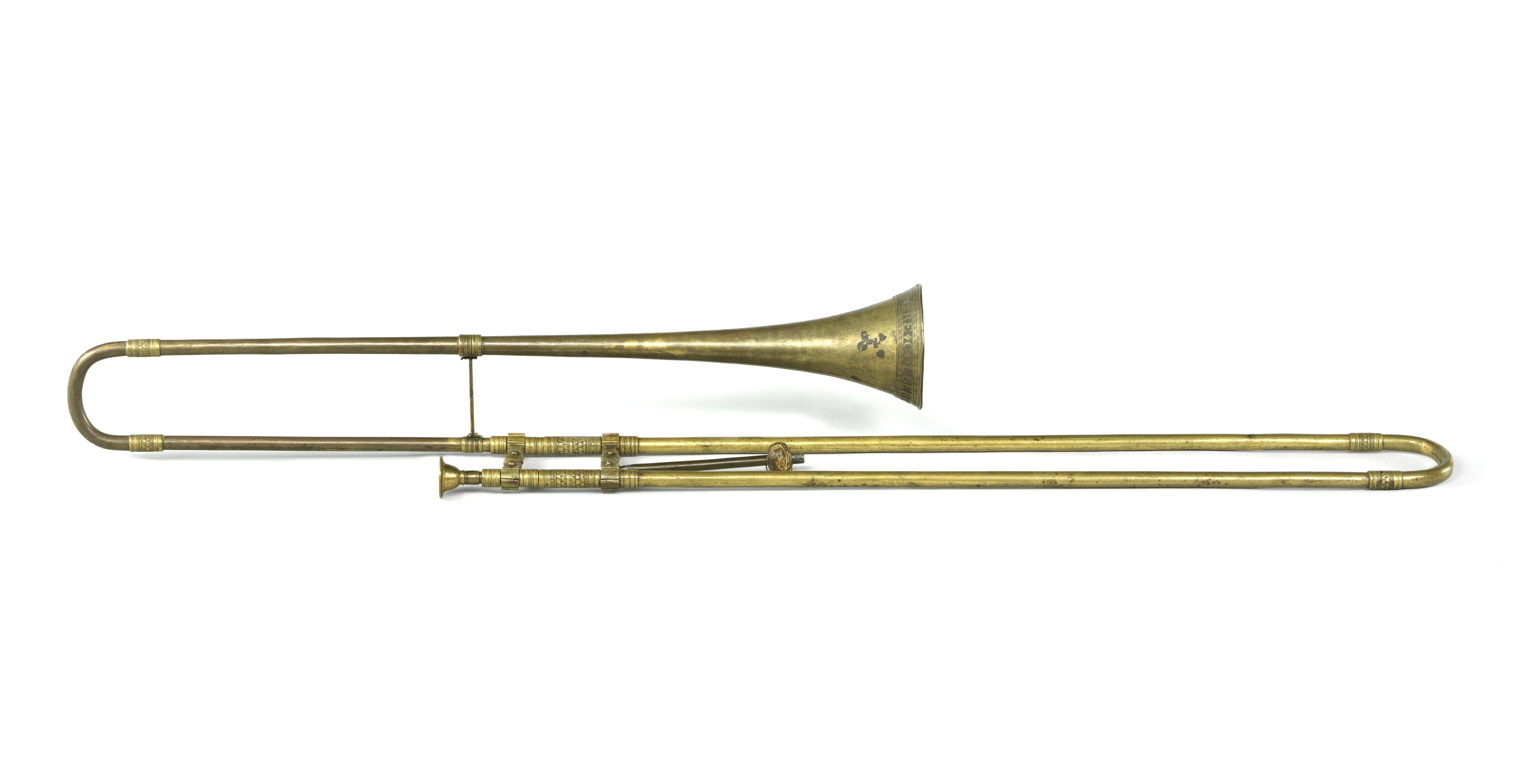
Bass sackbut in G by Pierre Colbert, 1593. Rijksmuseum, Amsterdam

The pitch of the trombones has (notionally) moved up a semi-tone since the 17th century, and this is explained in the section on pitch.

Because the tenor instrument is described as "Gemeine" (common or ordinary), this is probably the most widely used trombone. The basses, due to their longer slides, have a hinged handle on the slide stay, which is used to reach the long positions.

Contrabass sackbut in B♭ by Georg Nikolaus Öller, 1639, Stockholm. The Swedish Museum of Performing Arts.

A giant contrabass sackbut known as the Octav-Posaun (lit. 'octave trombone') was known in 16th and early 17th centuries, and is represented by only a few existing instruments. One surviving original instrument in B♭, an octave below the tenor, built in 1639 by Georg Nicolaus Öller in Stockholm, is housed in the Scenkonstmuseet. In addition, Ewald Meinl has made a modern copy of this instrument, and it is currently owned and played by Wim Becu.

== Construction ==
The bore size of renaissance/baroque trombones is approximately 10 mm (0.39 in) and the bell rarely more than 10.5 cm (4.1 in) in diameter. This compares with modern tenor trombones, which commonly have bores 12.7 mm (0.50 in) to 13.9 mm (0.55 in) and bells 17.8 cm (7.0 in) to 21.6 cm (8.5 in).

Modern reproductions of sackbuts sacrifice some authenticity to harness manufacturing techniques and inventions that make them more comfortable for modern players, while retaining much of the original character of the old instruments.

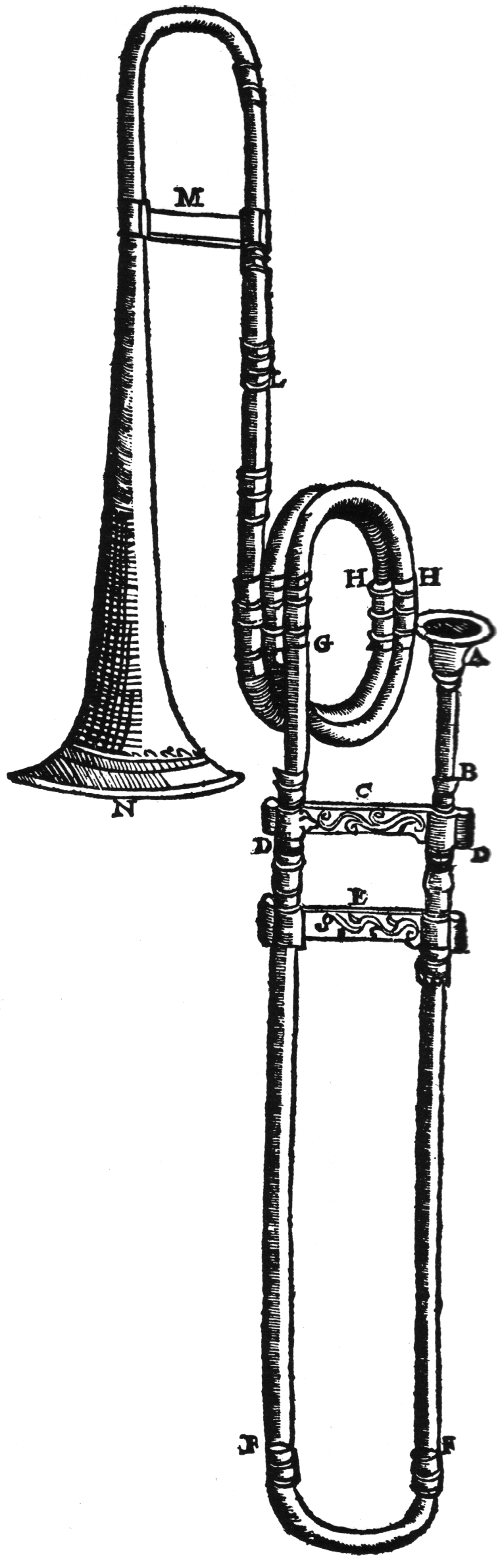
Marin Mersenne, L'Harmonie universelle (1636).

Some original instruments could be disassembled into the constituent straight tubes, bowed tubes, bell flare, and stays, with ferrules at the joints. Mersenne has a diagram. (Little imagination is needed to see how it could be reassembled—with an extra tube—into something approaching a natural trumpet.) There is a debate as to whether they used tight fittings, wax or another joining substance. Modern sackbut reproductions are usually soldered together. Some modern sackbut reproductions use glue as a compromise to give a loose fitting for high resonance without risk of falling apart.

Tuning slides came in during the very late 18th century. Early trombonists adjusted pitch with the slide, and by adding variously shaped and sized crooks. Modern reproductions often have a bell bow tuning slide or telescopic slide between the slide and bell sections. Crooks are still used, as are variously sized bell bow sections for larger changes.

The stays on period sackbuts are flat. While the bell stay remained flat, from about 1660 the slide stays became tubular. On many modern reproductions round slide stays are much more comfortable to play and easier to make.

A loose connection between the bell stay and the bell is thought key to a resonant bell, and thus a better sackbut sound. Original instruments have a hinge joint (a looser connection helped imperfect slides slide). Modern copies with a tuning slide in the bell can need more support for operation of the slide, so either an extra stay by the tuning slide is provided or a joint without play in only one axis is employed.

The original way to make the slide tubes was to roll a flat piece of metal around a solid cylinder mandrel, and the joining edges soldered together. Modern manufacturers now draw the tubes. They also tend to have stockings, which were only invented around 1850. In addition, modern made slides are usually made of nickel silver with chrome plating, giving a smoother finish and quieter action than simply the brass that would have originally been used.

The water key was added in the 19th century, but modern reproductions often have them.

== Pitch ==
Until some time in the 18th century, the trombone was in A and the pitch of that A was about a half-step higher than it is today—460–480 Hz. There was a transition around the 18th century when trombones started to be thought of in B♭ at around 440 Hz. This change did not require a change in the instrument; there was merely a renaming of notes for given slide positions. But it does mean that the baroque and renaissance repertoire was intended to be played at the higher pitch. There are many examples of evidence for this:

- Fellow church instruments that are fixed pitch—cornetts and organs—were pitched at approximately A=460–480 Hz ("Chorton") across Europe in the Renaissance and baroque eras. High pitch is also seen in Renaissance wind bands.

Virgiliano's treatise Il Dolcimeo (c. 1600).

- Aurelio Virgiliano's Il dolcimelo (c. 1600) teaches trombonists that first position gives A, E, A, C, E and G.
- In 1687, Daniel Speer's Grund-richtiger concurs with these notes for the slide all the way in (while describing pushing the slide out a bit to get the C).
- Praetorius describes an alto in D, tenor in A, and bass in D.

The tenor trombones that survive are pitched closest to B♭ at A=440 Hz, which is the same as A at A=466 Hz. So what we now think of as a tenor trombone with B♭ in first position, pitched at A=440 was actually thought of as a trombone in A (in first position), pitched at A=466. Surviving basses in D at A=466 (E♭ at 440)—for example: Ehe, 1612 (Leipzig) and Hainlein, c.1630 (Nuremberg) confirm Praetorius' description. It is also worth noting that Rognoni's "Suzanne ung jour" setting descends repeatedly to BB♭, which is a tone lower than the lowest note playable on a bass in F; on a bass in D, it falls in (modern) fifth position.

Many groups now perform at A=466 Hz for the sake of greater historical accuracy.

== Timbre ==
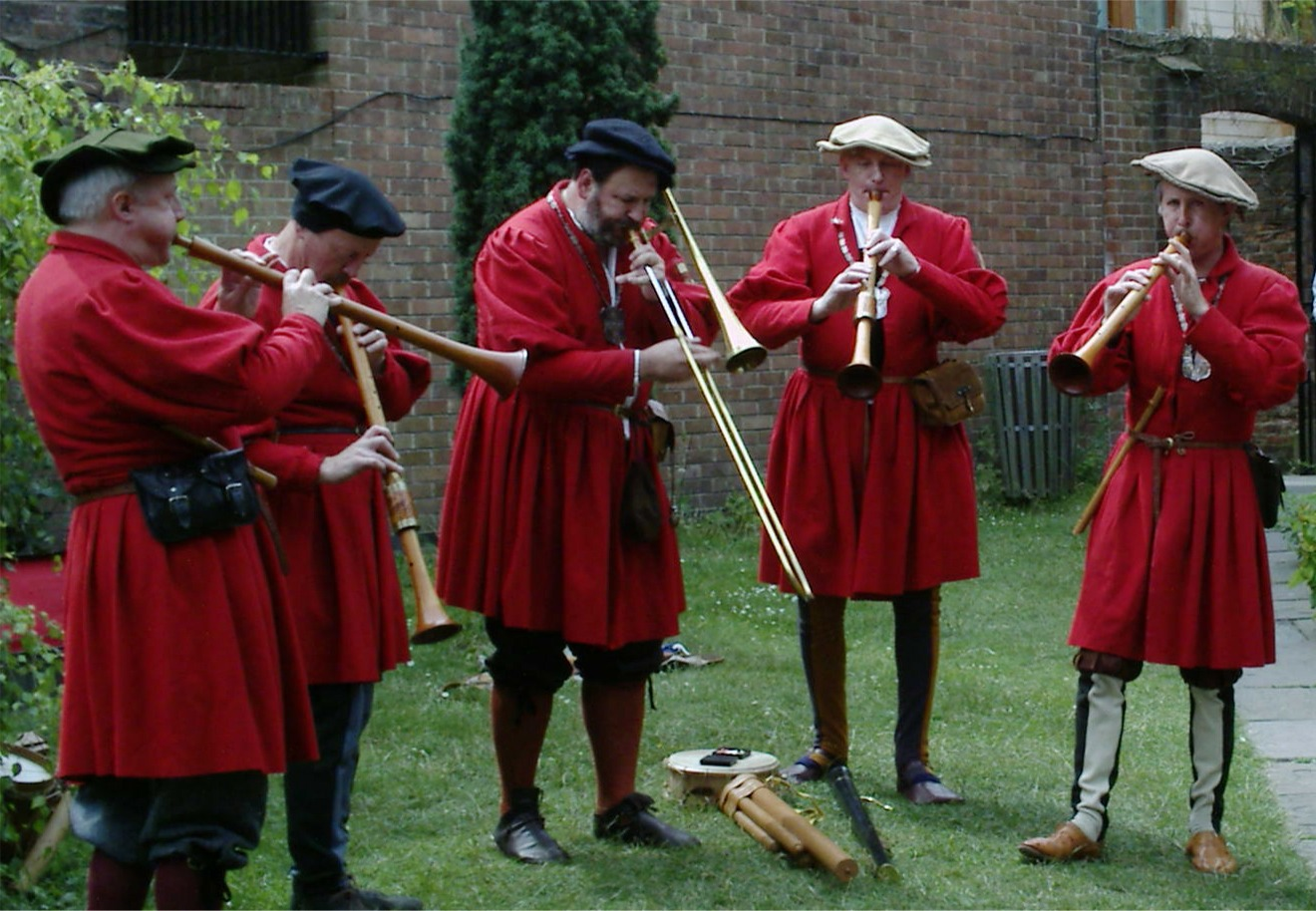
A re-created wait, an ensemble of loud instruments suited to playing outdoors. Centre, a sackbut.

The sackbut was described as suitable for playing with the 'loud' ensembles in the outdoors, as well as the 'soft' ensembles inside.

The alta capella bands are seen in drawings as entertaining outside with ensembles including shawms, trumpets and trombones. When pushed, sackbuts can easily make a loud and brassy sound.

The sackbut also responds very well to rather soft playing—more so than a modern trombone. The sound is characterized by a more delicate, vocal timbre. The flat rims and shallow cups of the older mouthpieces are instrumental in providing the player with a much wider palette of articulations and tonal colours. This flexibility lends itself to a vocal style of playing and facilitates very characterful phrasing.

Mersenne wrote in 1636, "It should be blown by a skillful musician so that it may not imitate the sounds of the trumpet, but rather assimilate itself to the sweetness of the human voice, lest it should emit a warlike rather than a peaceful sound."

Lorenzo da Lucca was said to have had "in his playing a certain grace and lightness with a manner so pleasing".

== Performance practice ==
In musical traditions that continued into the baroque from earlier practice, musicians were expected to give expression to the written music by ornamenting with a mixture of one-note "graces" and whole passage "divisions" (also known as "diminutions"). The suggestions for producing effective ornaments without disrupting the line and harmony are discussed alongside countless examples in the 16th and early 17th century Italian division tutors. Graces such as the accento, portar della voce, tremolo, groppo, trillo, esclamationo and intonatio are all to be considered by performers of any music in this period.

"Cornetts and trombones...play divisions that are neither scrappy, nor so wild and involved that they spoil the underlying melody and the composer's design: but are introduced at such moments and with such vivacity and charm that they give the music the greatest beauty and spirit" Bottrigari, Venice 1594

Along with the improvisation, many of these tutors discuss articulation. Francesco Rognoni in 1620 describes the tonguing as the most important part of producing "a good and beautiful effect in playing wind instruments, and principally the cornett" (which of course had a very similar role to the trombone). The treatises discuss the various strengths of consonants from "le" through "de" to "te". But the focus of the text is for playing rapid notes "similar to the gorgia of the human voice" with "soft and smooth" double tonguing ("lingua riversa") using "le re le re". This is opposed to using "te che te che", which is described as "harsh, barbarous and displeasing". The natural 'pairing' of notes these articulations provide is similar to the instructions for string players who are instructed to slur ("lireggiar") pairs of eighth notes with one bow stroke per quarter beat.

Another integral part of the early music sound-world is the musical temperament. Music in the middle-ages favours intervals of the fourth and fifth, which is why Pythagorean tuning was used. The interval of a third was used as a clash until the Renaissance, when it became consonant in compositions, which went hand-in-hand with the widespread use of meantone temperament. During the 17th century, Well temperament began to become more and more popular as the range of keys increased. Temperament affects the colour of a composition, and therefore modern performances, typically employing equal temperament, may not be true representations of the composers' intentions.

These old tunings are the result of the natural harmonic series of a brass instrument such as the sackbut.

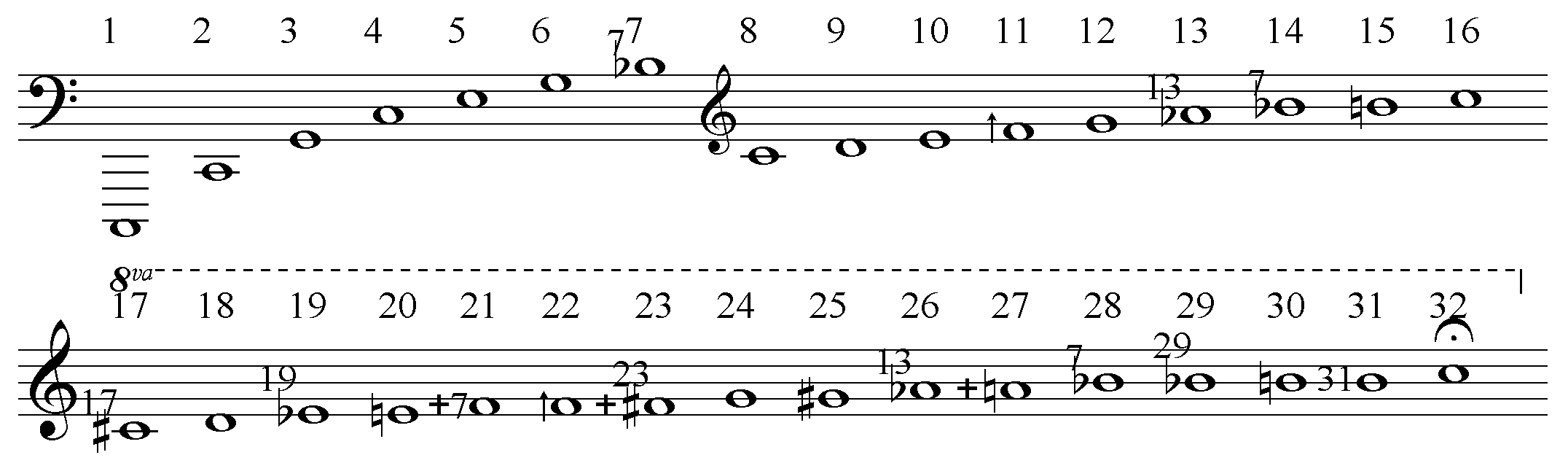
Natural harmonic series on C, 1 to 32, showing the F slightly sharp by 16.5 cents

As the bell is smaller than a modern trombone, the harmonic series is closer to a perfect harmonic series, which is the basis for just tuning. Without adjusting the slide, the first to second harmonic is a perfect octave, second to third harmonic is a fifth slightly wider than equal temperament and fourth to fifth harmonic is a major third slightly narrower than in equal temperament. These adjusted intervals make chords ring and are the basis of meantone. Playing a sounding C and F♯ in exactly the same position on a modern orchestra sounds out of tune, but it tunes perfectly well on in a sackbut choir if everyone plays natural harmonics.

Excerpt from a trombone part from a Picchi canzon (1625). The baritone clef seen here is very common for trombone parts of this era.

Copies of music for trombone from this era still remain, and understanding for music of the time can be gained from analysis, however in order to read these, one needs to become familiar with the old clefs, time signatures, ligatures and notational conventions from the period.

== Symbolism ==
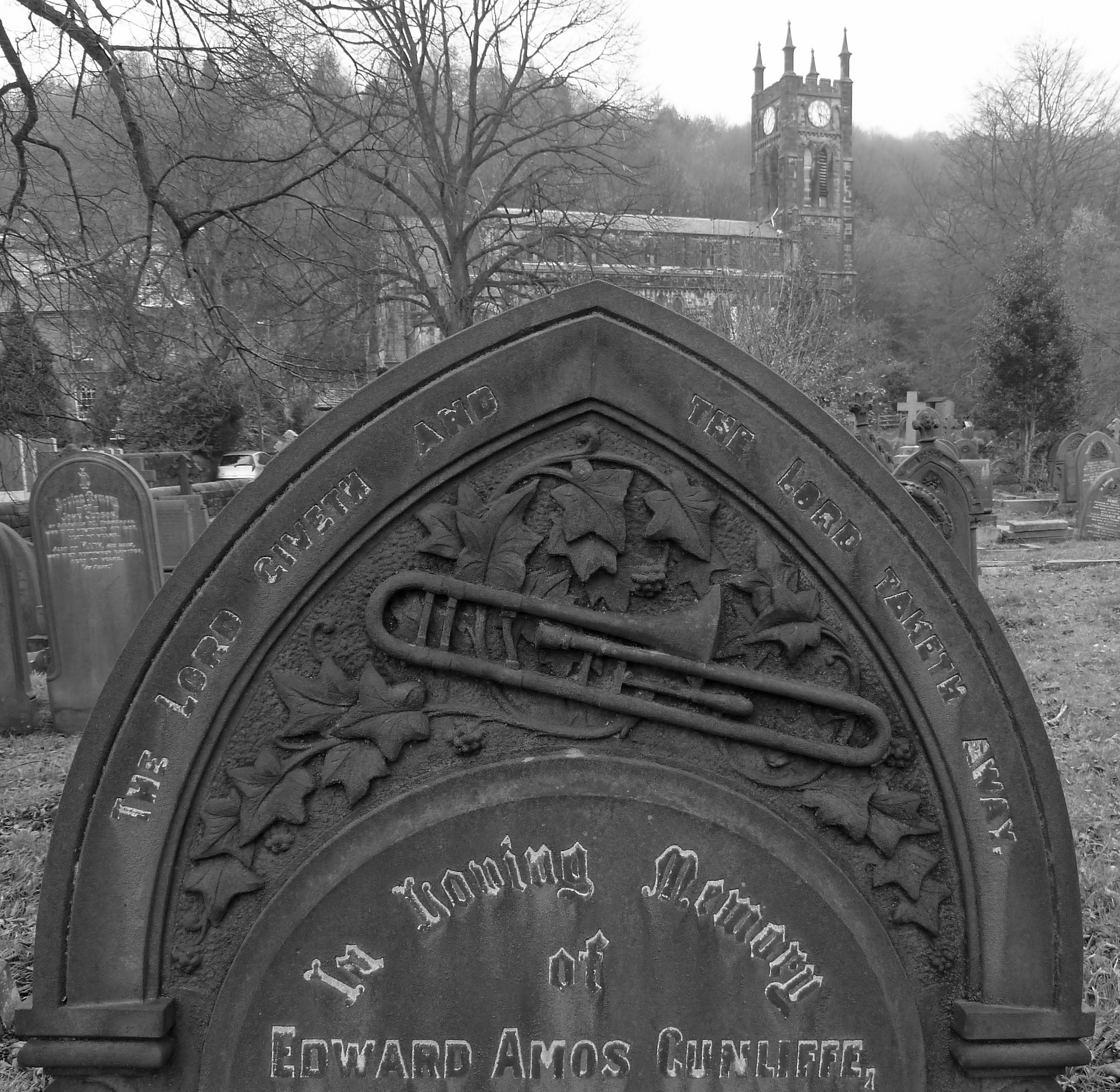
Trombone on a 1909 headstone, Christ Church, Todmorden

The sound of sackbuts (and trombones) has long been thought especially solemn and noble, had an association with death and the afterlife. The instrument was a symbol of divine presence, the voice of the angels and instrument of judgment. This symbolism can be seen, for instance, in L'Orfeo, Alceste, The Magic Flute, the Death March from Saul, and funeral aequales.

This association was probably encouraged by the lack of distinction made between natural horns, slide trumpets, and trombones in this Renaissance; they were used and often named interchangeably. Martin Luther's 1534 translation of the Bible into German renders the Greek shophar and salpigx to Posaune. Posaune at the time could refer to a natural horn or other brass instrument, but it later came to mean exclusively "trombone" (similarly, English translations generally have "trumpet", and only occasionally "horn" or "shofar"). This gives the later reader of the Luther Bible texts such as: “…we shall all be changed, in a moment, in the twinkling of an eye, at the last trombone; for the trombone shall sound and the dead shall be raised incorruptible" (1 Corinthians 15:52).

== Repertoire ==
=== Before 1600 ===
The sackbut replaced the slide trumpet in the 15th century alta capella wind bands that were common in towns throughout Europe playing courtly dance music. See Waits.

Another key use of the trombone was in ceremonies, in conjunction with the trumpet. In many towns in Germany and Northern Italy, 'piffari' bands were employed by local governments throughout the 16th century to give regular concerts in public squares and would lead processions for festivals. Piffari usually contained a mix of wind, brass and percussion instruments and sometimes viols.

Venice's doge had his own piffari company and they gave an hour-long concert in the Piazza each day, as well as sometimes performing for services in St. Mark's. Each of the six confraternities in Venice also had their own independent piffari groups too, which would all play at a lavish procession on the feast of Corpus Domini. These groups are in addition to the musicians employed by St. Mark's to play in the balconies with the choir (the piffari would play on the main level).

It also was used in church music both for instrumental service music and as a doubling instrument for choral music. The treble and high alto parts were most often played by cornetts or shawms, with the violin sometimes replacing the cornett in 17th century Italian music.

The first record of trombones being used in churches was in Innsbruck 1503. Seville Cathedral's records show employment of trombonists in 1526, followed by several other Spanish cathedrals during the 16th century, used not only for ceremonial music and processionals, but also for accompaniment of the liturgical texts as well, doubling voices.

The sacred use of trombones was brought to a fine art by the Andrea Gabrieli, Giovanni Gabrieli and their contemporaries c.1570-1620 Venice and there is also evidence of trombonists being employed in churches and cathedrals in Italy at times during the second half of the 16th century in Bologna, Rome, Padua, Mantua and Modena.

Since ensembles had flexible instrumentation at this time, there is relatively little music before Giovanni Gabrieli's publication Symphoniae sacrae (1597) that specifically mentions trombones. The only example currently known is the music by Francesco Corteccia for the Medici wedding 1539.

=== 1600–1700 ===
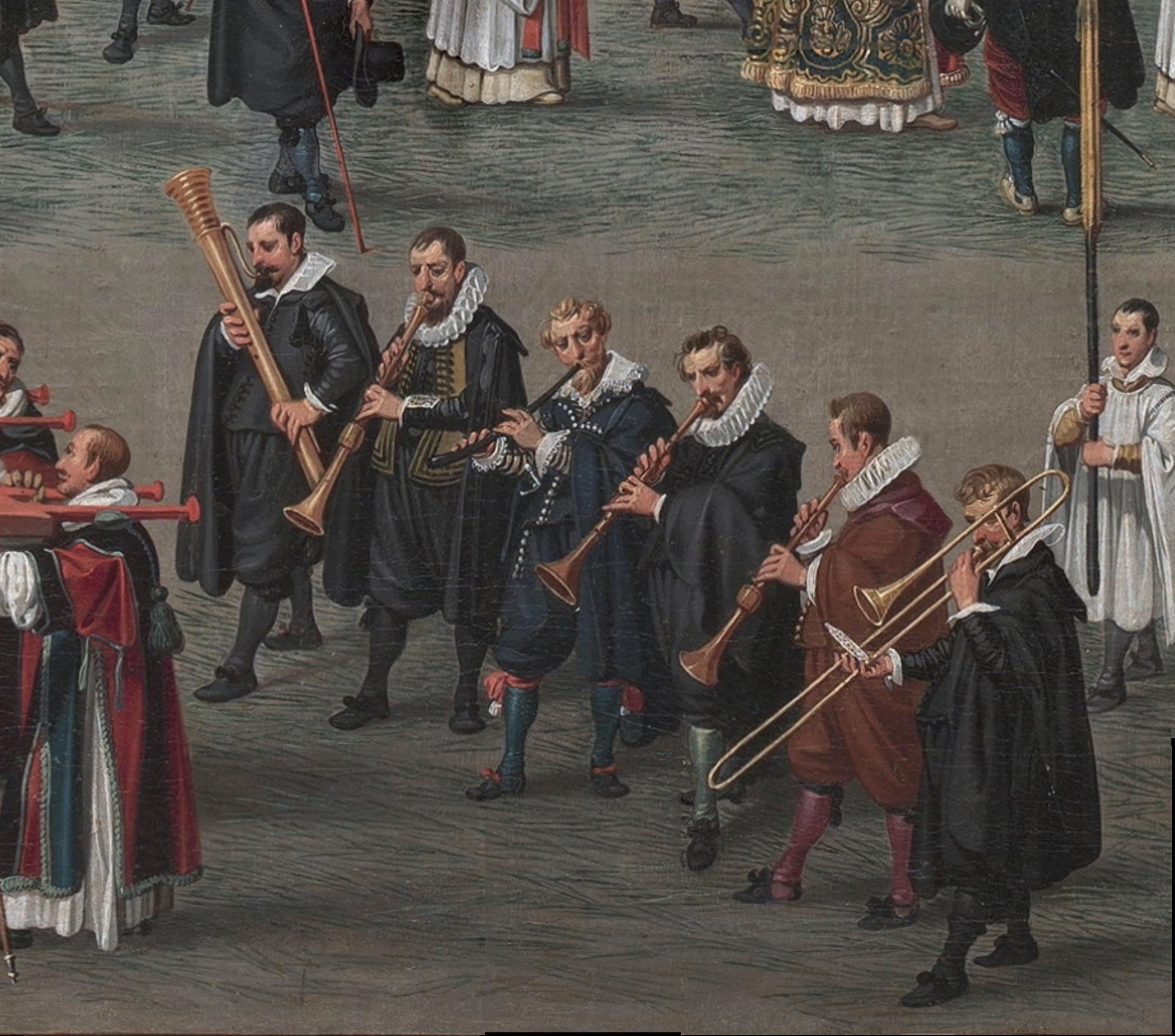
Musicians from 'Procession in honour of Our Lady of Sablon in Brussels.' Early 17th-century Flemish alta cappella. From left to right: bass dulcian, alto shawm, treble cornett, soprano shawm, alto shawm, tenor sackbut.

==== Solo ====
The 17th century brings two pieces of real solo trombone repertoire.

Giovanni Martino Cesare wrote La Hieronyma, (Musikverlag Max Hieber, MH6012) the earliest known piece for accompanied solo trombone. It comes from Cesare's collection Musicali Melodie per voci et instrumenti a una, due, tre, quattro, cinque, e sei published in Munich 1621 of 28 pieces for a mixture of violins, cornetts, trombone, vocal soloists and organ continuo. The collection also contains La Bavara for four trombones.

The other solo trombone piece of the 17th century, Sonata trombone & basso (modern edition by H Weiner, Ensemble Publications), was written around 1665. This anonymous piece is also known as the 'St. Thomas Sonata' because it was kept in the library of the Saint Thomas Augustinian Monastery in Brno, Czech Republic.

Francesco Rognoni was another composer who specified the trombone in a set of divisions (variations) on the well-known song Suzanne ung jour (London Pro Musica, REP15). Rognoni was a master violin and gamba player whose treatise Selva di Varie passaggi secondo l'uso moderno (Milan 1620 and facsimile reprint by Arnaldo Forni Editore 2001) details improvisation of diminutions and Suzanne is given as one example. Although most diminutions are written for organ, string instruments or cornett, Suzanne is "per violone over Trombone alla bastarda". With virtuosic semiquaver passages across the range of the instrument, it reflects Praetorius' comments about the large range of the tenor and bass trombones, and good players of the Quartposaune (bass trombone in F) could play fast runs and leaps like a viola bastarda or cornetto. The term "bastarda" describes a technique that made variations on all the different voices of a part song, rather than just the melody or the bass: "considered illegitimate because it was not polyphonic".

==== Chamber music ====
In the 17th century, a considerable repertoire of chamber music using sackbut with various combinations of violins, cornetts and dulcians, often with continuo, appeared. Composers included Dario Castello, Giovanni Battista Fontana, Giovanni Paolo Cima, Andrea Cima, Johann Heinrich Schmelzer and Matthias Weckmann.

Antonio Bertali wrote several trio sonatas for 2 violins, trombone and bass continuo in the mid-17th century. One such Sonata a 3 is freely available in facsimile form from the Düben Collection website hosted by Uppsala universitet. A "Sonata a3 in C" is published by Musica Rara and attributed to Biber, although the authorship is unclear and it is more likely to have been written by Bertali.

Dario Castello, a wind player at St. Mark's Venice in the early 17th century had two books of Sonate Concertate published in 1621 and 1629. The sonatas of 1-4 parts with bass continuo often specify trombones, as well as cornett, violin and bassoon. The numerous reprints during the 17th century affirm his popularity then, as perhaps now.

Giuseppe Scarani joined St. Mark's Venice in 1629 as a singer and in the following year published Sonate concertate, a volume of works for 2 or 3 (unspecified) instruments (and b.c.). The title has been suggested was chosen to try and capture some of Castello's success.

Tiburtio Massaino wrote a Canzona for eight trombones, published in Raverio's 1608 collection.

Johann Heinrich Schmelzer wrote several sonatas that included trombones—such as his Sonata à 7 for two cornetts, two trumpets, three trombones, and basso continuo.

Daniel Speer published a four-part sonata in Neu-gebachene Taffel-Schnitz (1685). In 1687, Speer published the first written instruction in sackbut (and several other instruments) playing: Grund-richtiger/kurtz/leicht und noethiger Unterricht der Musicalischen Kunst. The second edition in 1697 provides two three part sonatas for trombones.

An English work of note from this period is Matthew Locke's Music for His Majestys Sagbutts and Cornetts, a suite for Charles II's coronation 1661.

==== Light music ====
Non-serious music, often based on dances for festive occasions, rarely had specified instrumentation. Often you find something like "per diversi musici". Indeed, the groups that would perform them would often be full of multi-instrumentalists.

Johann Pezel wrote for Stadtpfeifer with his Hora decima musicorum (1670), containing sonatas, as well as Fünff-stimmigte blasende Music (1685) with five-part intradas and dance pieces.

Well known pieces from Germany includes Samuel Scheidt's Ludi Musici (1621) and Johann Hermann Schein's Banchetto musicale (1617).

The first English piece scored for trombone is John Adson's Courtly Masquing Ayres (1611). Another light collection suitable for including trombones is Anthony Holborne's Pavans, Galliards, Allmains, and other short Aeirs both Grave and Light in Five Parts for Viols, Violins or Other Musicall Winde Instruments (1599).

==== Sacred music ====
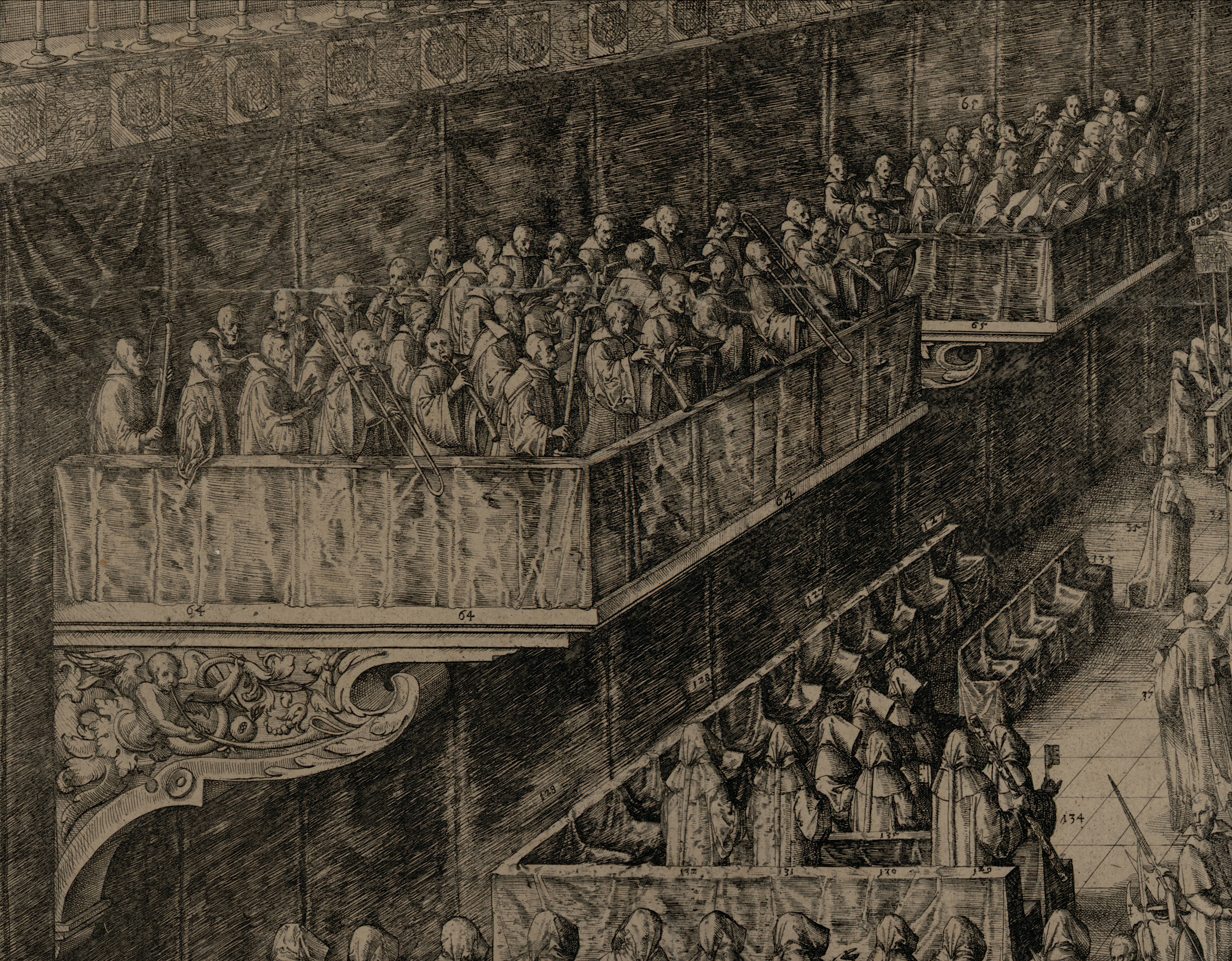
Musicians gallery from the funeral of Charles III, Duke of Lorraine. The gallery has a mix of instruments and musicians including singers, sackbuts, bass shawms, cornetts, lutes, viols (both bowed and plucked).

===== Venice =====
Trombonists were in the regular ensemble at St. Mark's Venice from its formation in 1568 until they left the payroll in 1732. The first two ensemble directors—maestro di concerti—Girolamo Dalla Casa (1568–1601) and Giovanni Bassano (1601–1617)—were cornett players and the nucleus of the group was two cornetts and two trombones, although for the larger ceremonies many extra players were hired. During a mass attended by the Doge, evidence suggests they would have played a canzona in the Gradual after the Epistle and the Agnus Dei, a sonata in the Offertory as well as reinforcing vocal parts or substituting for absent singers.

This ensemble was used extensively by Giovanni Gabrieli in pieces substantially for brass, voices and organ in Venice up until his death in 1612. He was greatly influential in Venetian composers in other churches and confraternities, and his early baroque and cori spezzati style is seen in contemporaries like Giovanni Picchi and Giovanni Battista Grillo.

It is suggested that Monteverdi wrote his Vespro della Beata Vergine (1610) as a pitch for employment at St. Mark's as successor to Giovanni Gabrieli. In addition to the Magnificat, two movements specify trombones: the opening "Deus in adiutorium" is for six voices, two violins, two cornetts, three trombones, five viole da braccio and basso continuo; Sonata sopra "Sancta Maria, ora pro nobis" is for soprano, two violins, two cornetts, three trombones (one of which can be a viola da braccio) and basso continuo. Monteverdi also leaves the option to use trombones as part of the "sex instrumentis" of the Dixit Dominus and in the instrumental Ritornello a 5 between verses of Ave maris stella.

From around 1617, when the maestro de' concerti at St. Marks changed to violinist Francesco Bonfante and correspondingly the ensemble changed from basically a brass ensemble to being more evenly mixed with brass, wind and string instruments.

Monteverdi arrived at St. Mark's in 1613 and it is unsurprising that he includes trombones and strings for several more sacred works during his time here, published in his Selva morale e spirituale 1641. Of the c.40 items in this collection, six specify three or four trombones (or viola da braccio, ad lib): SV268 Beatus vir I, SV263 Dixit Dominus I, SV263 Dixit Dominus II, SV261 Et iterum venturus est, SV258 Gloria in excelsis Deo, SV281 Magnificat I. Each is for 3-8 voices with 3 violins (apart from SV261), the trombones/violas and basso continuo. Monteverdi also specified trombones in two more sacred works: SV198 Laetatus sum (i) (1650) for 6 voices, 2 violins, 2 trombones and bassoon and SV272 Laudate Dominum omnes gentes I (1641) for 5 voices 'concertato', 4 voice chorus ad lib, 4 viola da braccio or trombones and basso continuo.

===== Germany/Austria =====
A prolific composer for trombones in Germany in the 17th century was Heinrich Schütz. His Fili me, Absalon (SWV 269) and Attendite, popule meus (SWV 270), are both scored for bass voice, four trombones (of which two are optionally violins) and basso continuo, are well known. They are part of his first Symphoniae Sacrae collection dating from 1629 and commentators have noted that the style reflects his studies in Venice with Giovanni Gabrieli 1609–1612. Other pieces that specify trombones (according to Grove) are (grouped by the collection they were published in): Concert mit 11 Stimmen (1618): SWV 21, in Psalmen Davids (Psalms of David) Op. 2 (1619): SWV 38, 40–46, Symphoniae sacrae I Op.6 (1629): SWV 259, 269–271, 274, Symphoniae sacrae II Op.10 (1647): SWV 344, Symphoniae sacrae III Op. 12 (1650): SWV 398a, Historia (1664): SWV 435, 448, 449, 453, 461, 452, 466–470, 473, 474–476, Schwanengesang Psalm 119 (1671): SWV 500, although many others are suitable for trombones too.

Johann Hermann Schein specified trombones in some of his sacred vocal works in the Opella nova, ander Theil, geistlicher Concerten collection (Leipzig, 1626). For example, Uns ist ein Kind geboren is scored for violino, traversa, alto trombone, tenor voice, fagotto and basso continuo. Mach dich auf, werde licht, Zion uses Canto 1: violino, cornetto, flauto picciolo e voce, Canto 2: voce e traversa, Alto: Trombone e Voce, Tenore: Voce e Trombone, Basso: Fagotto Trombone e Voce and Basso Continuo, during which solos for each of the trombonists are specified. Of particular interest is Maria, gegrüsset seist du, Holdselige, which uses soprano and tenor voices, alto trombone, 2 tenor trombones and on the bass line "trombone grosso," which goes down to pedal A, and a couple of diatonic scale passages from bottom C.

German composer Johann Rudolf Ahle wrote some notable sacred pieces for voices and trombones. Höre, Gott uses five favoriti singers, two ripieno choirs (which double other parts at intense moments) and seven trombones, with basso continuo. And his most famous Neu-gepflanzte Thüringische Lust-Garten.. (1657–65) contains several sacred works with 3 or 4 trombones, including Magnificat a 8 for SATB soloists, cornett, 3 trombones and continuo and Herr nun lässestu deinen Diener a 5 for bass, 4 trombones and continuo.

Dieterich Buxtehude specifies trombones in a few sacred concertos using style derived from polychoral Venetian works and one secular piece. For example, Gott fähret auf mit Jauchzen (BuxWV33 from CW v, 44) is scored for SSB voices, 2 violins, 2 violas, trombones, 2 cornetts, 2 trumpets, bassoon and basso continuo.

There are a few vocal works involving trombones in works by Andreas Hammerschmidt. These include Lob- und Danck Lied aus dem 84. Psalm for 9 voices, 5 trumpets, 3 trombones, 5 violas and basso continuo (Freiberg, 1652). There is also Hochzeitsgesang für Daniel Sartorius: Es ist nicht gut, dass der Mensch allein sei for 5 voices, 2 violins, 2 trombones, bassoon and basso continuo.

Johann Schelle has numerous sacred vocal works that use trombones. For instance Vom Himmel kam der Engel Schar is scored for soprano, tenor, SSATB choir, 2 violins, 2 violas, 2 cornetts, 3 trombones, 2 trumpets, timpani, basso continuo, and Lobe den Herrn, meine Seele is for two choirs of SSATB and similar instruments to the previous work.

The lesser known Austrian composer Christoph Strauss, Kapellmeister to the Habsburg Emperor Mathias 1616–1620, wrote two important collections for trombones, cornetts and voices. His motets published in Nova ac diversimoda sacrarum cantionum composition, seu motettae (Vienna, 1613) are in a similar tradition to Gabrieli's music. Of the sixteen motets in the collection, all are titled "concerto" apart from the "sonata" Expectans Expectavi Dominum for 6 trombones, cantus voice and tenor voice. In 1631 he published a number of masses, which were much more baroque, with basso continuo, rhetorical word painting and obligato usage of instruments.

Later in the 17th century, Heinrich Ignaz Franz Biber composed sacred works for voices and orchestra featuring trombones. His Requiem mass (1692) uses an orchestra of strings, 3 trombones and basso continuo. A similar ensemble accompanies 8 vocal lines in his Lux perpetua (c1673), and three more similar works in the 1690s.

==== Theatre ====
Monteverdi ushers sackbuts into the first great opera, 'L'Orfeo' 1607. The orchestra at the first performance, as shown in the first publication, the list of "stromenti" at the front of the score specifies four trombones, but at one point in Act 3, however, the score calls for five trombones.

=== 1700–1750 ===
There is relatively little repertoire for the trombone in the late baroque.

Johann Sebastian Bach uses trombones in fourteen of his church cantatas—BWV 2, 3, 4, 21, 23, 25, 28, 38, 64, 68, 96, 101, 121, 135—as well as motet BWV 118. He uses the trombone sound to reflect the (by now) archaic sounds of the Renaissance trombones doubling voices (with cornett playing the soprano line), yet he also uses them independently, which John Eliot Gardiner says prepares the way for their use in Beethoven's Symphony No. 5. The cantatas were either composed in Leipzig during 1723–1725, or (for BWV 4, 21 & 23) the trombone parts were added to the existing cantata during the same period. The cornett and trombone parts would have been played by the Stadtpfeifer.

In England, George Frideric Handel includes trombones in three of his oratorios: Saul (1738), Israel in Egypt (1738) and Samson (1741). There are no other documented groups or performances with trombone players in England at this time, and it has been suggested that the premiers took place with a visiting group from Germany, as was the custom in Paris at this time.

Vienna's Imperial court used trombones in church music:

Johann Joseph Fux was Hofkapellmeister in Vienna from 1715 until 1741. Many of his masses use the choir strengthened by strings, cornetts and trombones, often with independent moments for the instrumentalists and sometimes. Missa SS Trinitatis uses two choirs, which again points to the traditions going back to Gabrieli. His highly successful Requiem is for five vocal parts, two cornetts, two trombones, strings and continuo. He also uses the trombone in smaller motets and antiphons, such as his setting of Alma Redemptoris mater for soprano, alto trombone, strings and continuo. Some of his chamber music involves trombones, as do many of his operas, used as an obbligato instrument.

Also in the Vienna court was Antonio Caldara, vice-kapellmeister 1717–1736. Among his output are two Holy Week settings as Da Capo arias: Deh sciogliete, o mesti lumi for soprano, unison violins, bassoon, two trombones and organ and Dio, qual sia for soprano, trombone, bassoon and basso continuo.

=== 1750–1800 ===
Again this period suffers from a lack of trombone players. Most of these works derive from Vienna and Salzburg.

Joseph Haydn uses trombones in Il rotorno di Tobia, Die sieben letzten Worte, The Creation, Die Jahreszeiten, Der Sturm, Orfeo ed Euridice and secular cantata choruses.

Wolfgang Amadeus Mozart uses trombones in connection with death or the supernatural. This includes the Requiem (K626, 1791), Great Mass in C minor (K423, 1783), Coronation Mass (C major) (K317, 1779), several other masses, Vesperae Solennes de Confessore (K339, 1780), Vesperae de Dominica, his arrangement of Handel's Messiah plus two of his three great operas: Don Giovanni (K527, 1787) and Die Zauberflöte (K620, 1791). Mozart's first use of the trombone was an obligato line in the oratorio Die Schuldigkeit des ersten Gebots (K35, 1767)

Christoph Willibald Gluck includes trombones in five of his operas: Iphigénie en Aulide (1774), Orfeo ed Euridice (1774), Alceste (1776), Iphigénie en Tauride (1779) and Echo et Narcisse (1779), as well as ballet Don Juan (1761).

Some chamber music in this period includes trombone in an obligato role with voice, and also as a concerto instrument with string orchestra. Composers include the likes of Leopold Mozart, Georg Christoph Wagenseil, Johann Albrechtsberger, Michael Haydn and Johann Ernst Eberlin.

For works for trombone post-1800, please see trombone.

== Recordings ==
Plenty of recordings of the authentic sackbut are now available from the groups such as Concerto Palatino, HMSC, Gabrieli Consort and the Toulouse Sacqueboutiers. For a closer examination of the instrument, here are some recommended recordings where the sackbut is heavily featured in a "solo" capacity.

- Songs Without Words. Adam Woolf. SFZMusic 2010.
- Treasury of a Saint. Caecilia Concert, Challenge Records 2006.
- La Sacqueboute. Michel Becquet, Les Sacqueboutiers de Toulouse.
- Sackbutt. Jorgen Van Rijen. Channel Classics 2008.
- Schmelzer & Co. Caecilia-Concert. Challenge Records 2009.
- Buxtehude & Co. Caecilia-Concert. Challenge Records 2007.

== Early surviving instruments ==
The earliest instruments:

Date	Maker	Made in	Category	Modern copies
1551	Erasmus Schnitzer	Nuremberg	Tenor	Piquemal, Toulouse (1980 ca.), Ewald Meinl "small bore"
1557	Georg Neuschel	Nuremberg	Tenor	
c.1560	Unknown	Venice?	Tenor	
1576	Anton Schnitzer I	Nuremberg	Tenor	
1579	Anton Schnitzer I	Nuremberg	Bass	
1581	Anton Schnitzer I	Nuremberg	Tenor	Egger (bore 10.-10.5mm, bell 100mm)
1587	Conrad Linczer	Nuremberg	Tenor	
1593	Pierre Colbert	Reims	Bass in G	
1594	Anton Schnitzer II	Nuremberg	Tenor	Mike Corrigan
1595	Anton Drewelewcz	Nuremberg	Tenor	Ewald Meinl "small bore"
1602	Andreas Reichart	Edfurt	?	
1607	Simon Reichard	Nuremberg	Bass in E-F	
1608	Jakob Bauer	Nuremberg	Tenor	
1612	Isaac Ehe	Nuremberg	Bass in D-Eb	Egger (bore 11.5-12.0mm, bell 124mm)
1677	Christian Kofahl	Meckelenburg	Soprano	bore 13mm external flaring to 74.5mm; authenticity has been questioned but not refuted

Other notable sackbuts:

Date	Maker	Made in	Category	Modern copies
1627	Sebastian Hainlein I	Nuremberg	Tenor	(Munich) (1932?) Egger 'tenor-bass' (bore 11.5/12.0mm bell 120mm)
1631	Sebastian Hainlein	Nuremberg	Tenor	Egger (bore 10.5/11.0mm, bell 98mm)
1639	Georg Nicolaus Oller	Stockholm	Bass in F	Ewald Meinl
1653	Paul Hainlein	Nuremberg	Tenor	Ewald Meinl "wide bore"
1670	Hieronimus Starck	Nuremberg	Alto	Egger (bore 10.0/10.0mm, bell 94mm)
1677	Paul Hainlein	Nuremberg	Tenor in C	Currently owned by Christian Lindberg
1785	Johann Joseph Schmied	Pfaffendorf	Alto in Eb	Egger "classical"
1785	Johann Joseph Schmied	Pfaffendorf	Bass in F	Egger "classical"
1778	Johann Joseph Schmied	Pfaffendorf	Tenor	(private collection in Basel) Egger "classical"

For more information, see Herbert (2006).

== Modern manufacturers ==
- Brad Close, Glendale (CA), USA
- Egger, Basel, Switzerland
- Ewald Meinl, Geretsried, Germany (formerly Meinl und Lauber)
- Geert Jan van der Heide, Netherlands
- Helmut Voigt, Germany
- Jürgen Voigt Brass, Germany
- Thein, Bremen, Germany
- Johannes Finke, Germany
- Markus Leuchter, Germany
- Nathaniel Wood, Brussels, Belgium
- C.Bosc, Chambave, Italy
- Roland de Wilde, IJsselmuiden, Netherlands
- Tony Esparis, Galicia, Spain
- Michael Rath, Huddersfield, UK
- Wessex tubas, UK

The modern German "church trombone" also resembles a sackbut.

== See also ==
- Electronic Sackbut, an early synthesizer.
- Glissando
