= Jean-Pierre Canihac =

French musician

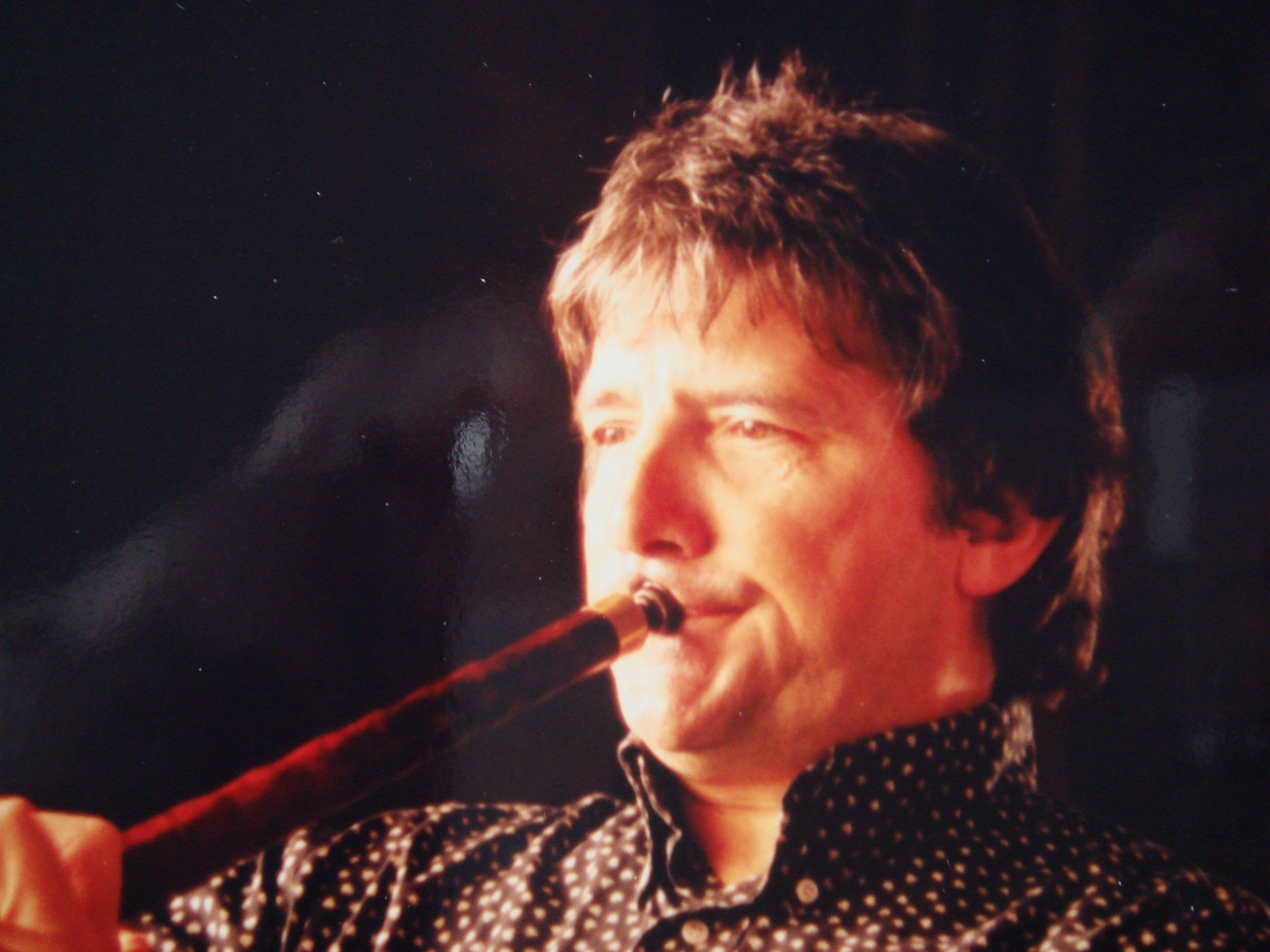
Jean-Pierre Canihac

Jean-Pierre Canihac is a French performer of early music and a founding member of Sacqueboutiers. Soloist of international ensembles, he has performed under the baton of Jordi Savall, Jean-Claude Malgoire, Nikolaus Harnoncourt, René Clemencic, Andrew Parrott, William Christie and Philippe Herreweghe. He has taught the cornett and natural trumpet in international academies of ancient music like Saintes, Genève, Barcelona and Daroca. In 1989, Canihac was named professor of Département de Musique Ancienne at the Conservatoire National Supérieur de Lyon. From 2001 to 2011 he was professor of the early music department at the Catalonia College of Music (Esmuc), in Barcelona, and currently he teaches cornetto and natural trumpet at the Toulouse Conservatoire.
