= Mary Immaculate Church, Annerley =

Mary Immaculate Church
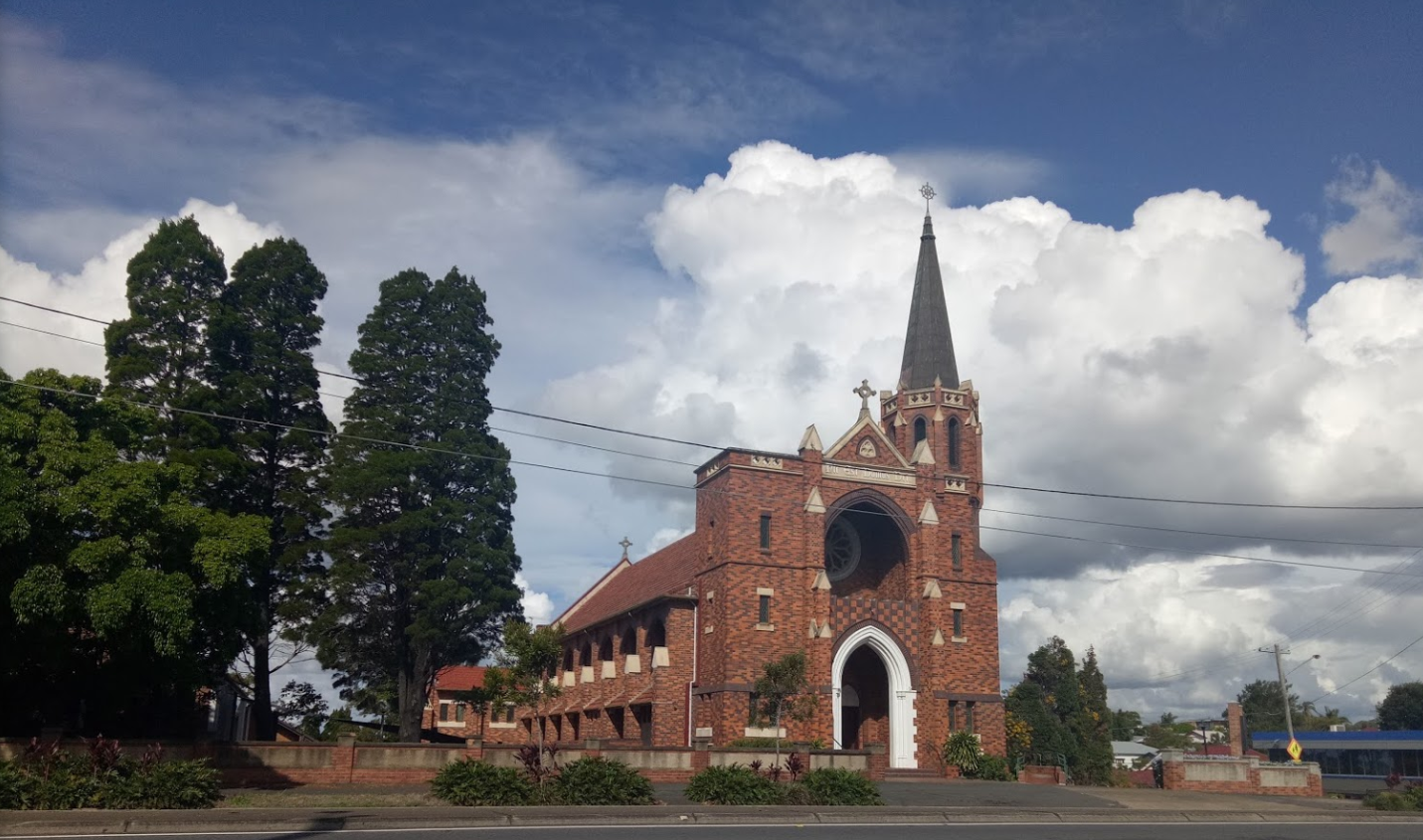
- Mary Immaculate Church

- Location within Queensland
- 27°31′01″S 153°01′50″E
- Location: Annerley, Queensland
- Country: Australia
- Denomination: Catholic
- Tradition: Latin Rite
- Religious institute: Congregation of the Oratory of St. Philip Neri
- Website: brisbane-oratory.org

History
- Status: Parish church
- Founded: 11 October 1931
- Founder: Archbishop James Duhig
- Dedication: Mary Immaculate
- Dedicated: 1 May 1932 by Archbishop James Duhig

Architecture
- Functional status: Active
- Architect: Jack Donoghue
- Architectural type: Church
- Style: Inter-war French Gothic
- Years built: 1931–1939
- Construction cost: A£10,451

Specifications
- Capacity: 600 people
- Materials: Roof: Terracotta tile; Walls: Face brick

Administration
- Archdiocese: Brisbane
- Parish: Annerley Ekibin

Brisbane Heritage Register
- Official name: Mary Immaculate Catholic Church
- Criteria: A, D, E, G, H
- Designated: 1 January 2004

Mary Immaculate Church is a heritage-listed Roman Catholic church located on the corner of Ipswich Road and Ferndale Street, Annerley, a suburb of Brisbane, Queensland, Australia. Mary Immaculate Church is located in the Archdiocese of Brisbane and is under the care of the Brisbane Oratory in Formation, a Congregation of the Oratory of St. Philip Neri.

== History ==
=== Purchase of land ===
With the growth of Annerley and surrounds in the early 1900s, increasing numbers of Catholics were forced to walk in excess of five kilometres to St Joseph's Church at Kangaroo Point for Sunday Mass and school.

A group of parishioners approached Archbishop James Duhig with a proposal to construct a building that could serve the parish as both a church and a school. Their request was approved and land was subsequently purchased by Archbishop Duhig for £814 in October 1912.

=== Original church and school ===
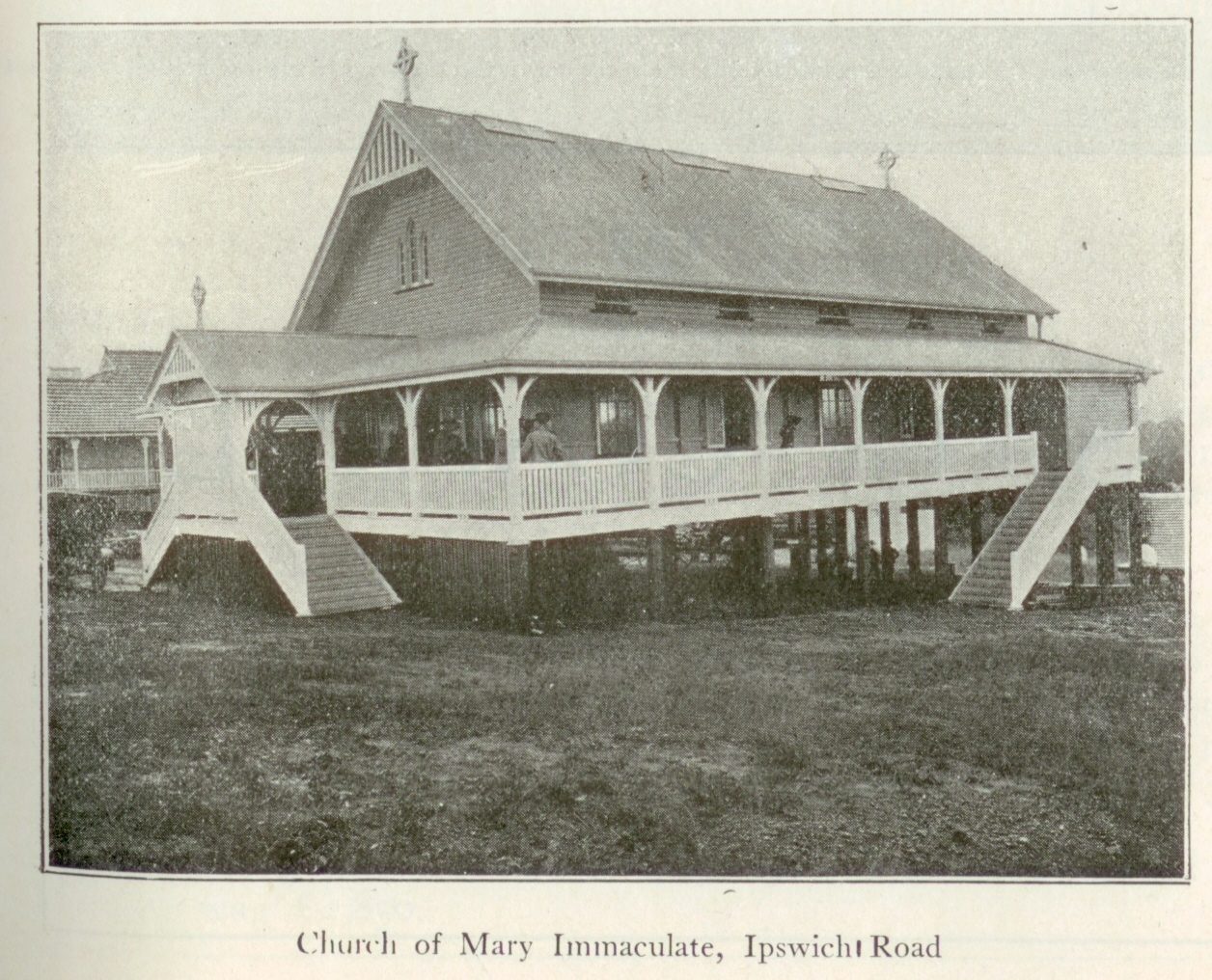
Original Church/School built in 1914.

The parishioners constructed the building within 20 months and on Sunday 14 June 1914, Archbishop Duhig blessed and opened the new church/school. The church was named Mary Immaculate and situated where the Marymac Community Centre now stands. The first parish priest was Fr James Gallagher who transferred from St Joseph's Cathedral in Rockhampton. The church was a timber structure surrounded by a verandah and was able to hold 300 people. The original high altar was constructed of timber.

The Ipswich Road Parish (as it was known) embraced the present parishes of Coopers Plains, Corinda, Darra, Graceville, Inala, Moorooka, Oxley, Salisbury, Sunnybank and Woodridge. The Parish Priests originally travelled by horseback to service the large area until the parishioners purchased a ‘T’ model Ford in 1920.

Further work was undertaken by the parish during that period including the purchase of a presbytery, building of classrooms beneath the church and the building of a convent for the Sisters of the Sacred Heart.

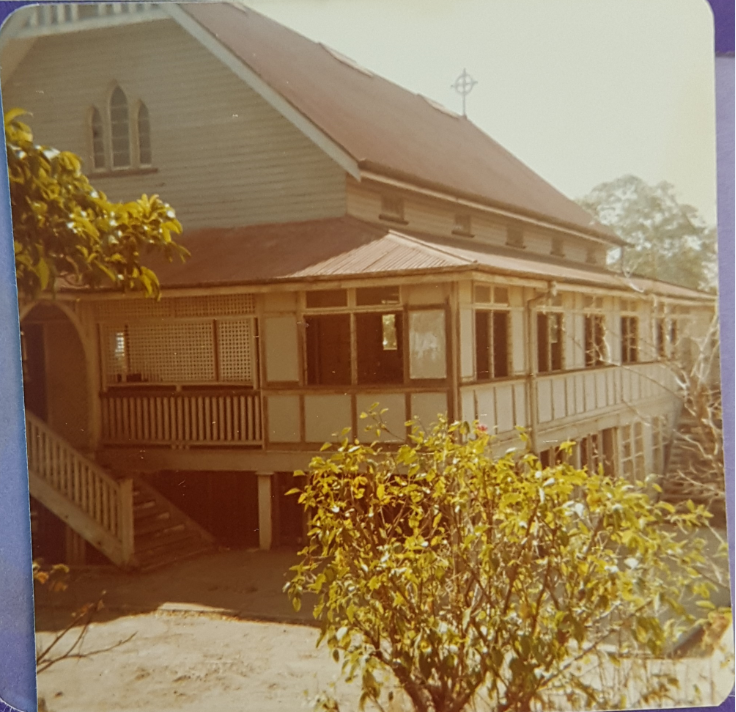
Original Church before demolition in 1977

=== Current church ===
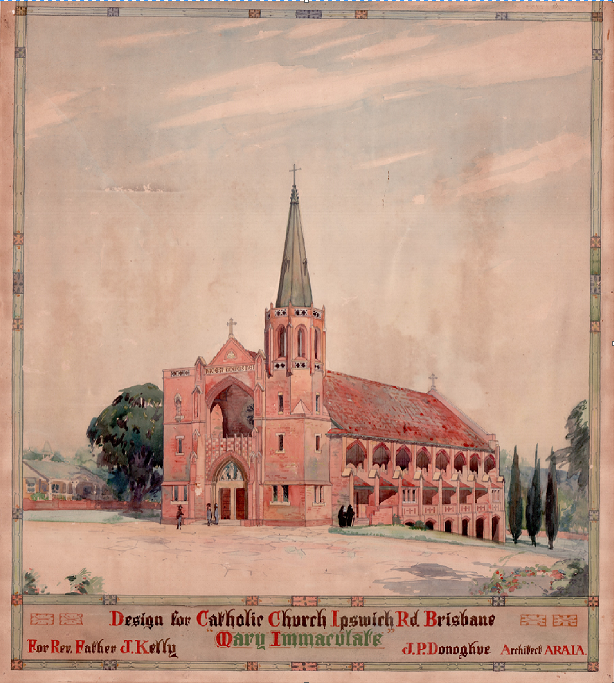
Concept Design. Note the front doors and the statue on the top left of the facade.

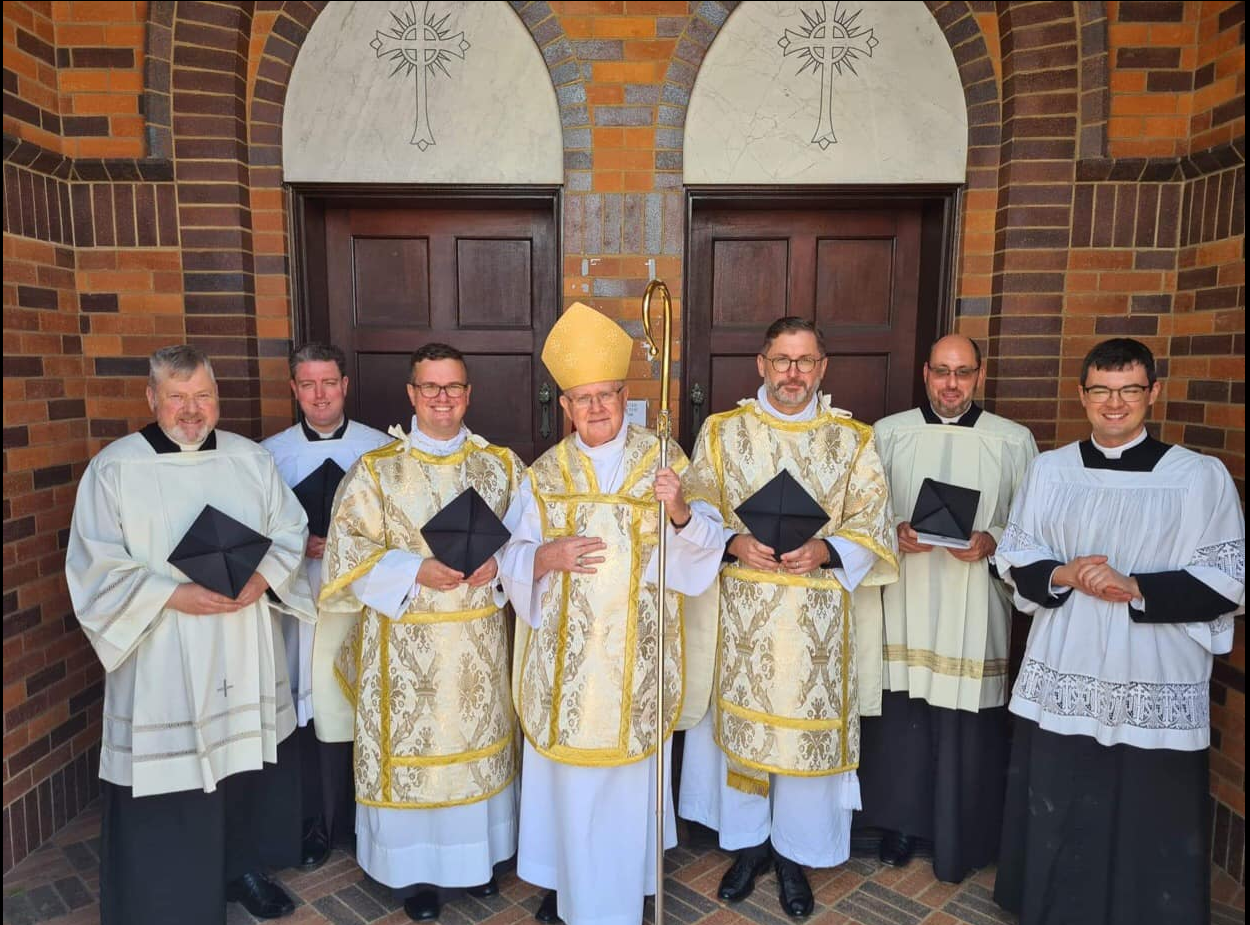
Visit by Archbishop Coleridge

Only ten years after the opening of the original church, Archbishop Duhig announced that a new church would be built to meet the needs of the fast-growing parish. He said that the church would be large and one of the finest of its kind in Queensland. The church would be built in memory of Parish Priest, Father James Gallagher, who had died of a heart attack on the Thursday before whilst performing maintenance work on the fence.

The Foundation stone was laid in the midst of the Great Depression on 11 October 1931 by Archbishop Duhig who stated that the beauty of the church would, “...elevate men’s minds to God the Author of all beauty and goodness.”

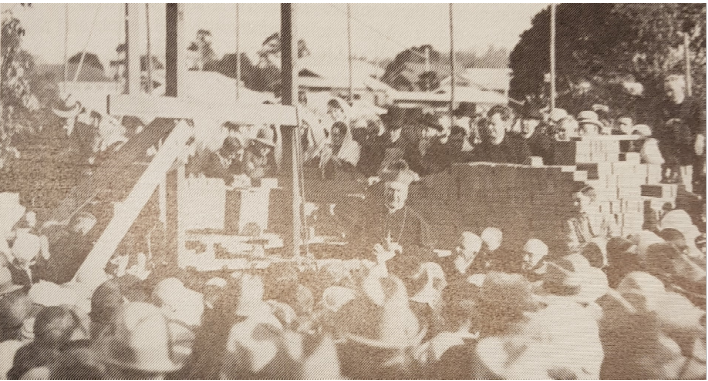
Laying of the Foundation Stone by Archbishop Duhig - 1 May 1932.

The church was completed and blessed by Archbishop Duhig during a High Mass on Sunday, 1 May 1932. Archbishop Duhig dedicated the church to Mary Immaculate stating:

"The completion of this church is a triumph not only for religion but for our architectural art. For many years to come this sacred edifice will stand as a monument to the faith and perseverance of the people. Young as Australia is, she has put up a fine record in raising noble edifices to the Glory of God. By building of a temple of God under the title of His Immaculate Mother we could be assured of her assistance and help in a very special way.”

— Archbishop Duhig

Building at a time of severe depression coupled with a need to build schools, convents and a presbytery meant that the church remains unfinished as the decorating and ornamenting have not been able to be undertaken due to a lack of funds. This included the painting of the sanctuary ceiling and installation of marble side altars. The marble High Altar was installed ten years after the completion of the church.

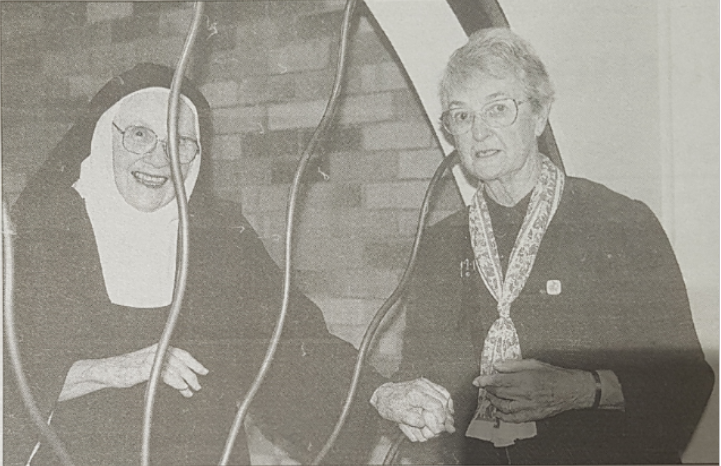
Members of the Freeney Family who were instrumental in fundraising for the church. Three Freney sisters joined the Society of the Sacred Heart and Margaret Freney became a cloistered Carmelite Sister.

Carmelite Sister Margaret Freney and Sacred Heart Sister Ursula Freney were members of the Freney family who were instrumental in establishing the Mary Immaculate Church. Masses were held at the Freney home prior to the church being built. Three Freney men were part of the original committee who approached Archbishop Duhig with a request to establish a church and school. Another two Freney sisters joined the Sisters of the Sacred Heart.

=== Fundraising for the church ===
Due to the generosity and hard work of the founding parishioners, Mary Immaculate Church now stands as one of the most beautiful churches in the Archdiocese of Brisbane. For decades the parish families performed endless fundraising events to ensure the growth of the parish. They held tennis mornings, bridge and euchre card games, bingo and fetes, along with many other events. This not only created the much needed funds, but also added to the social structure of the parish, as the families socialised together.

The parish was also fortunate to receive funds from visiting US Soldiers who were stationed at the nearby Camp Yeronga during WWII.

The total cost of the church was A£10,451 of which £5,295 was raised by the time of the dedication which was a significant amount considering the impact of the Great Depression. Archbishop Duhig paid tribute to the work undertaken by the parishioners during a difficult time where one in five workers were unemployed in Brisbane:

"Moreover I must congratulate the Ipswich Road people on the fact that they have not let posterity to pay for their Church. Notwithstanding the fewness of our numbers and the scantiness of our resources… The Catholic Church seems ever able to alleviate distress by creating employment and its building operations particularly at the present time of stress should be very welcome to the Government of this State. Mr R. M.King, Minister for Public Instruction and Works whilst in attendance at the laying of the foundation stone paid tribute to the work of the parishioners during the very trying and difficult times, "Economists, business men and the despised politicians were all trying to hit on some method and means of solving the problem of depression but he was very much afraid that at times they lost sight of the fact that human aid could not help itself without the agency of the supernatural. No public man should be ashamed to mount on a platform and acknowledge the need of divine aid when he was trying to do the right thing for the State. Now more than ever did those in authority need the prayers and assistance of the people."

— Archbishop Duhig

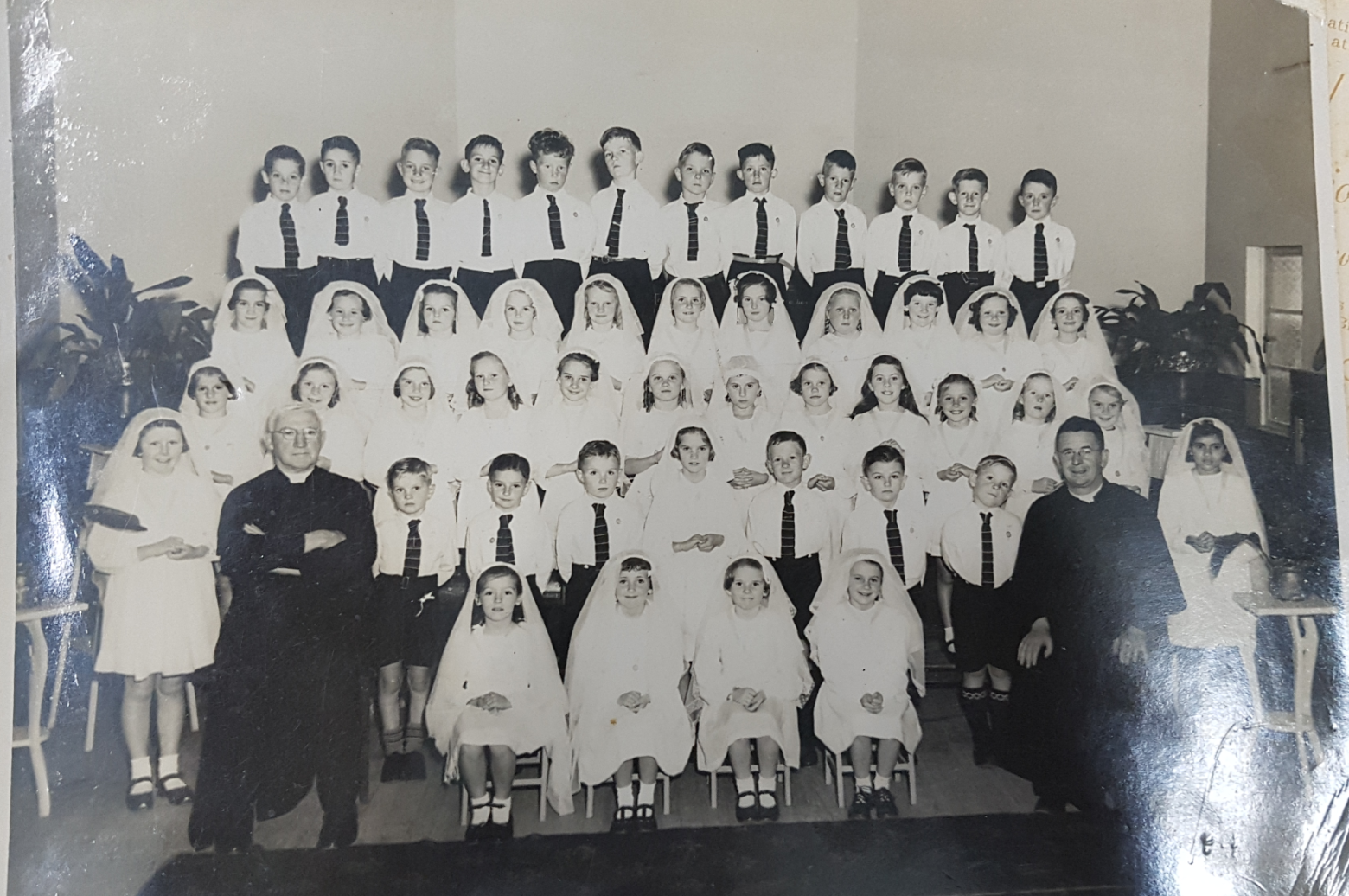
Holy Communion Class of 1951

== Architectural description ==
Archbishop Duhig described the church as, ‘an imposing brick structure of which the tower and spire stand out clearly on the heights of Annerley. A most impressive large Gothic arch with the words “Hic Est Domus Dei” - This is the House of God.’

The church was designed to suit the summer climate by allowing the church to convert to an open air building. It is designed to hold 600 people. Provision was also made for a parish hall under the church (Building and real estate). All building materials are Queensland products and the work was completed by local labour. Steel beams which were used to build the Sydney Harbour Bridge were used to hold up the floor. The striking features when built were the ceiling of gothic trusses, mural confessionals and lamp fittings which were designed in the form of a cross and a grand pulpit made of silky oak.

The church is a French Gothic style which dominates the south western corner of the site which it shares with a presbytery, convent, classroom buildings and other associated school facilities. Apart from the church, all buildings on this site have been constructed after 1950. The church is built in the traditional form with a western front which is located close to the Ipswich Road alignment. The design includes a number of significant features including an octagonal bell tower with a copper spire and a large rose window on its western face.

=== Gallery ===
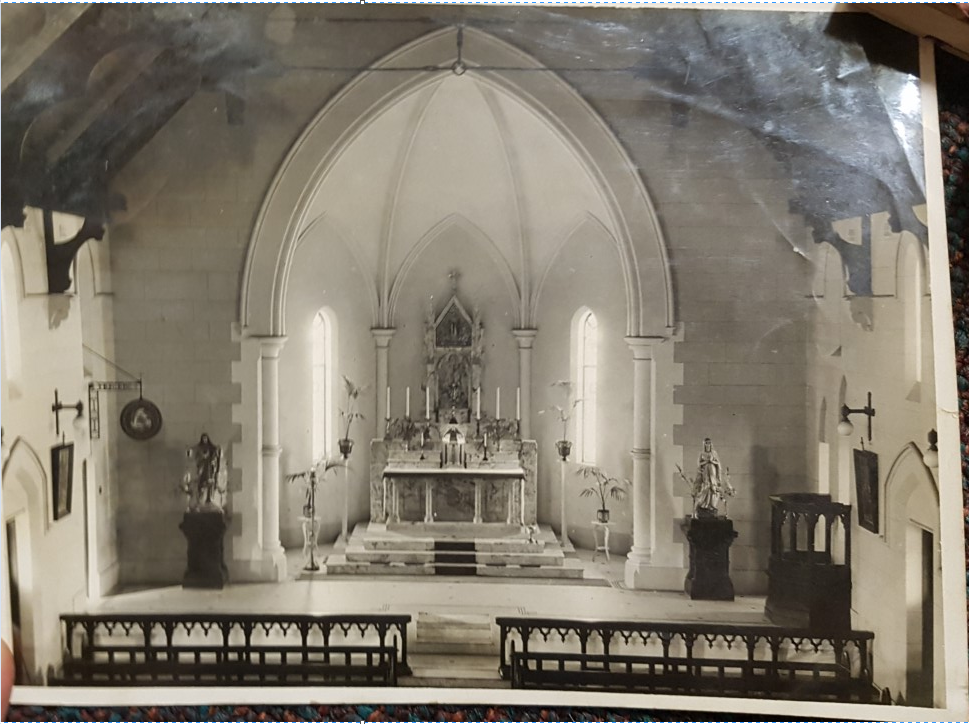
Interior of Church circa 1940s

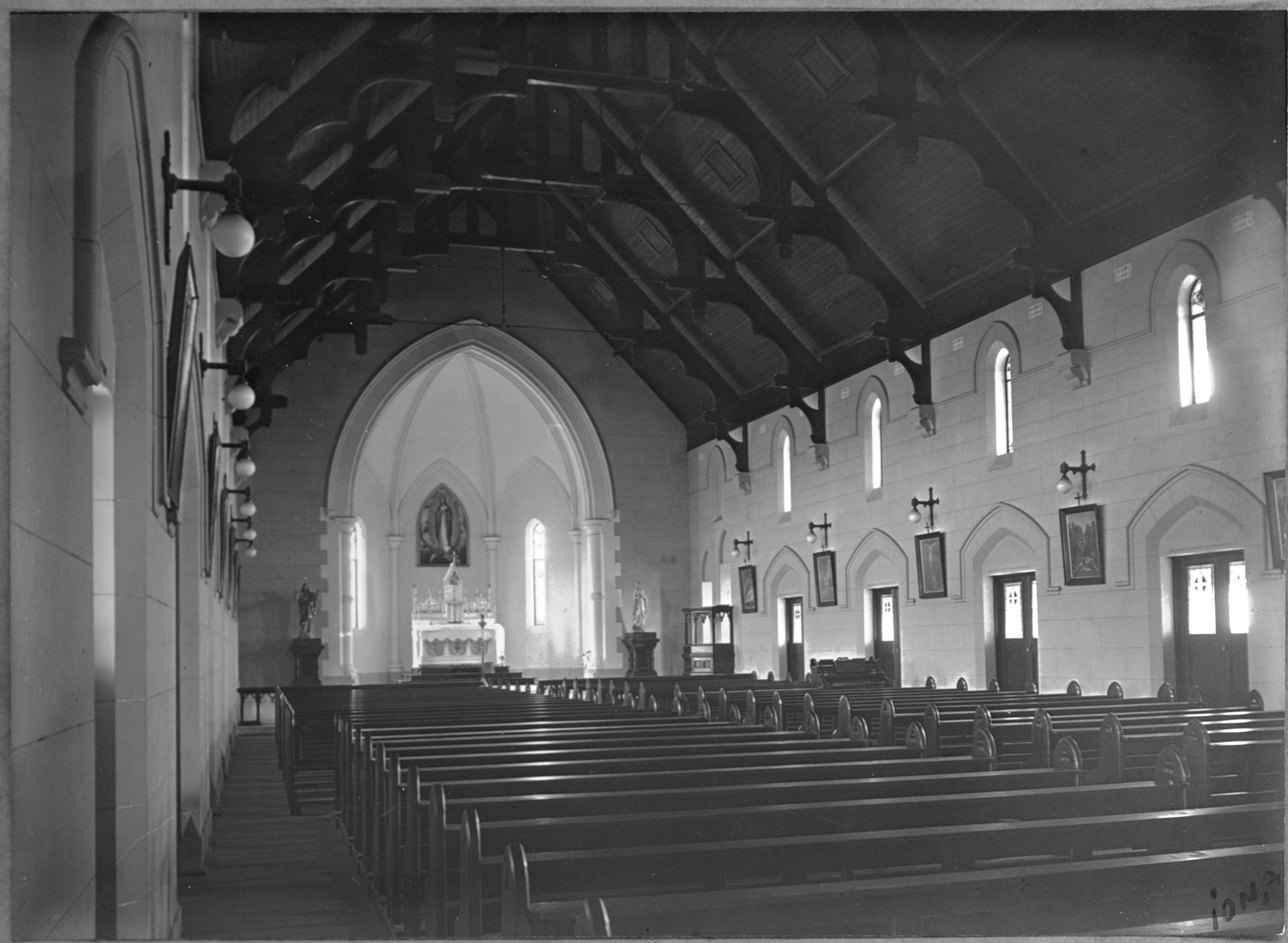
Interior of Church in 1932

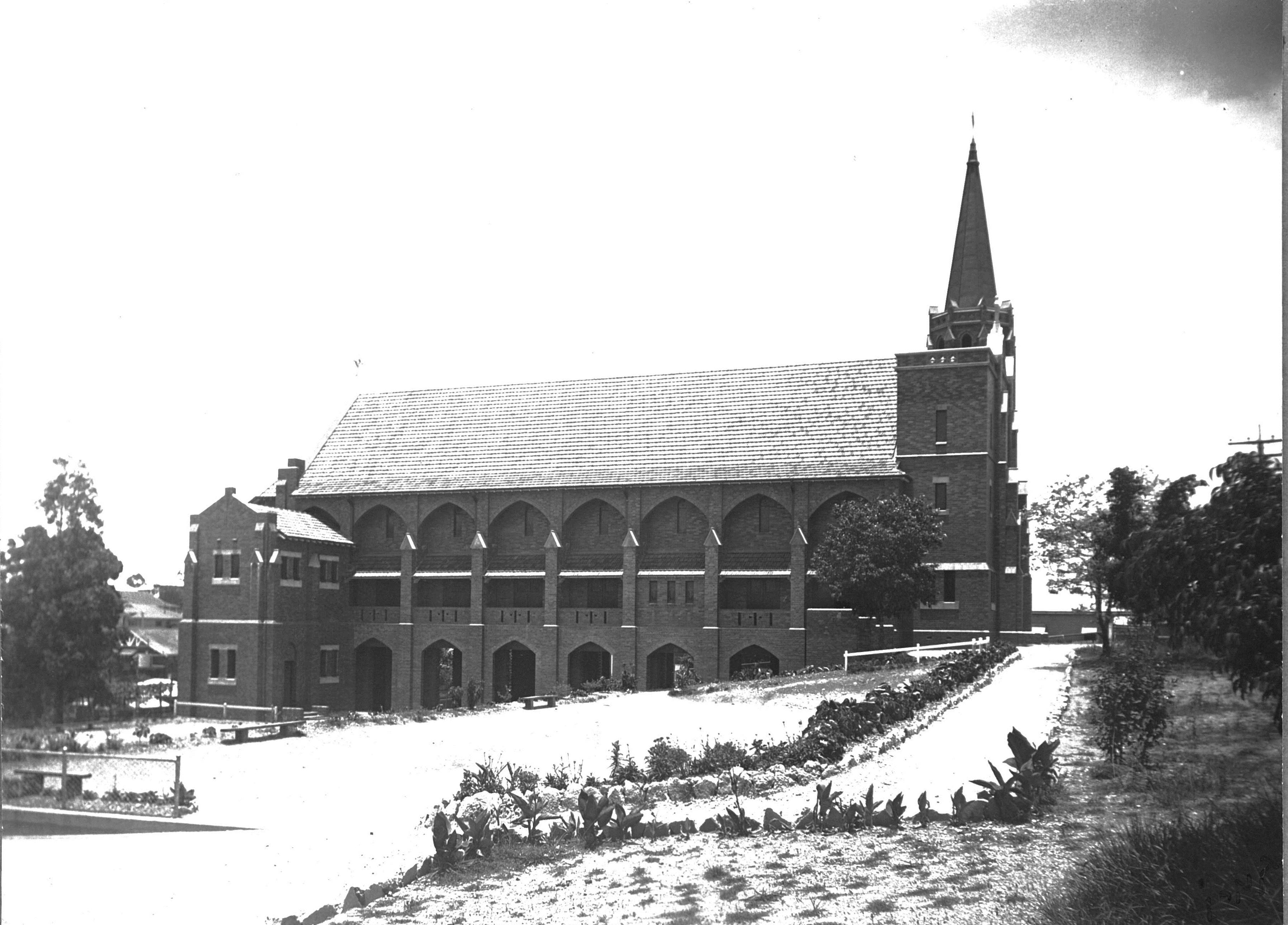
Chester Road View

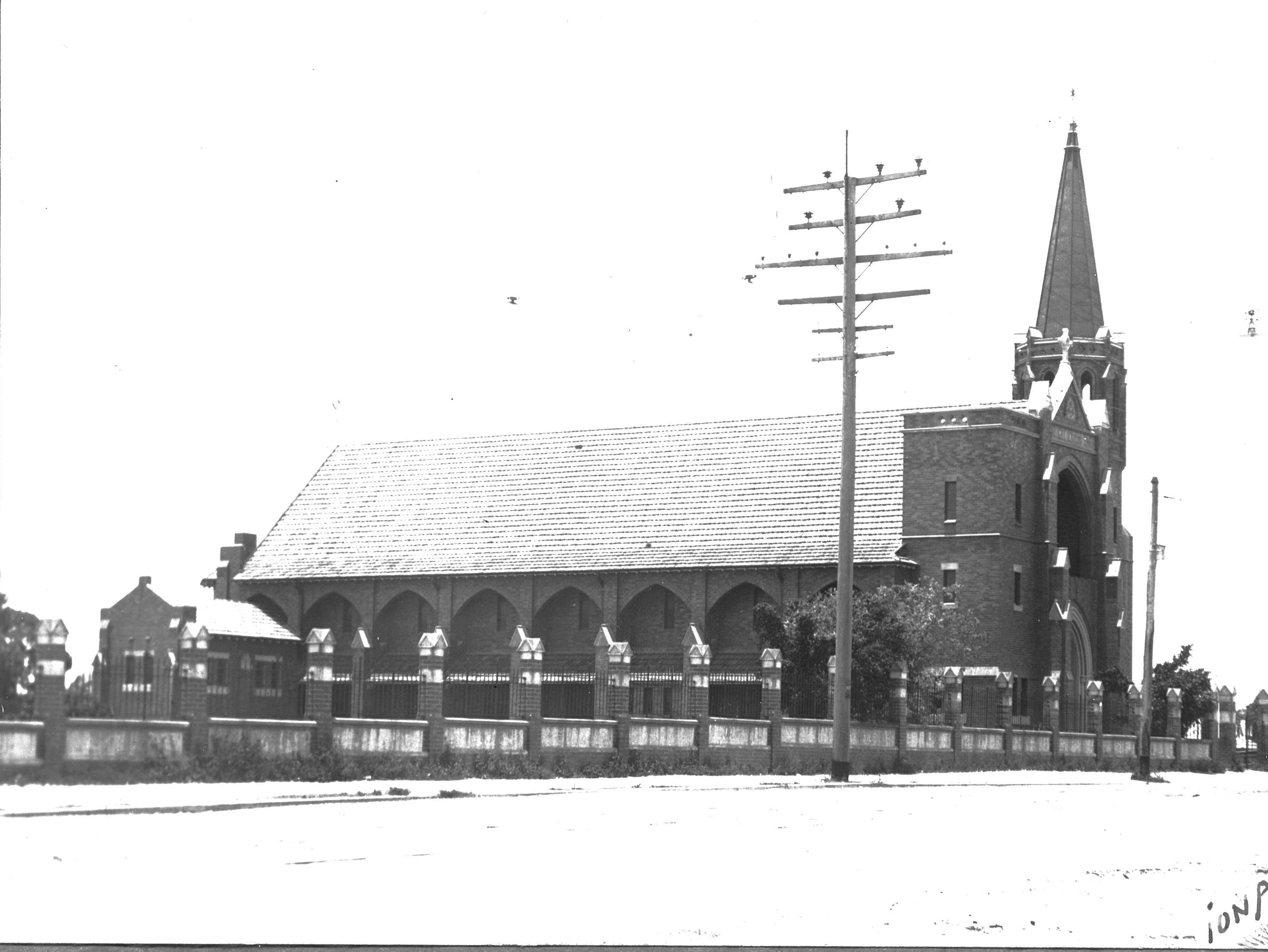
Ipswich Road View with Original Fence

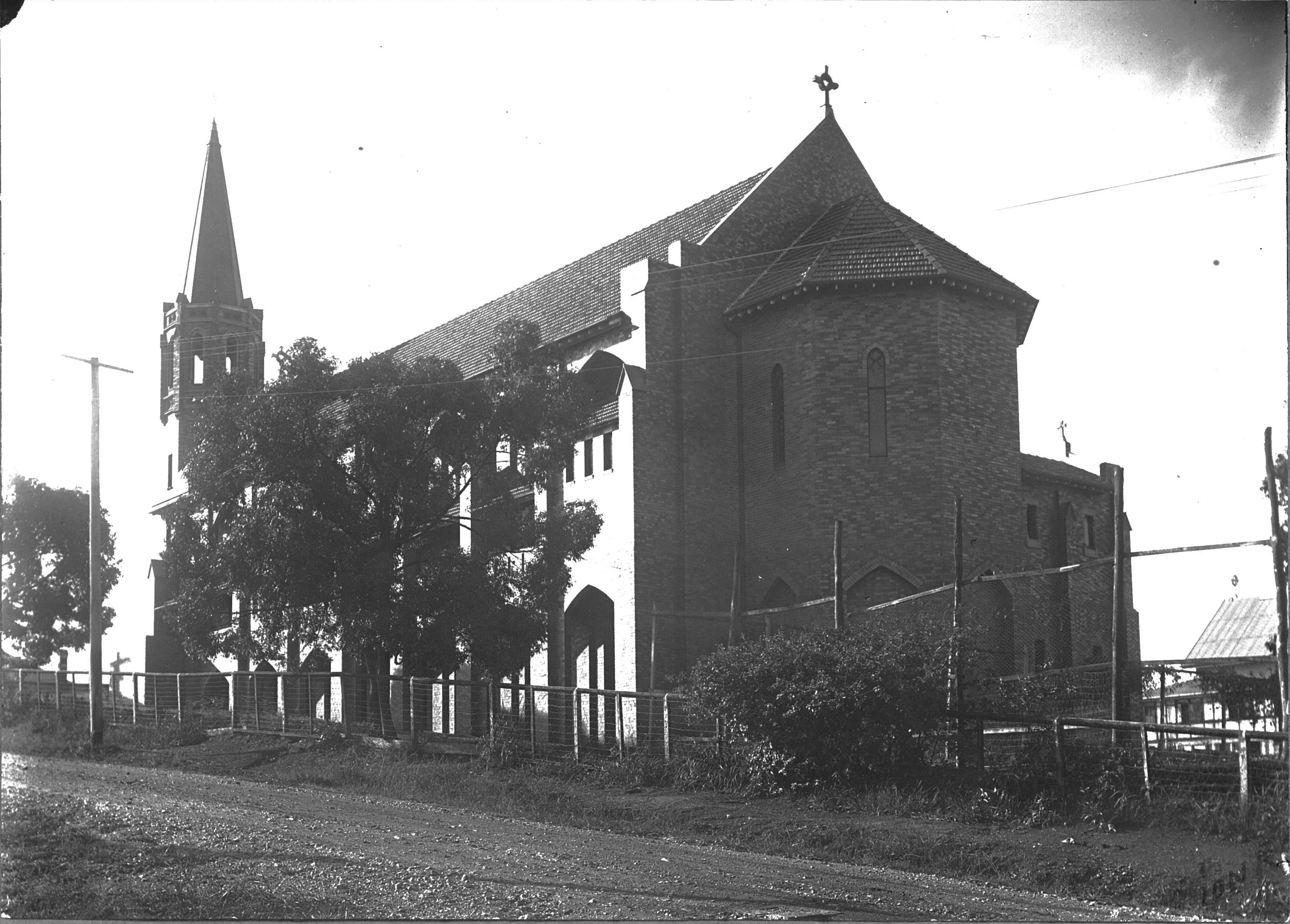
Rear of Church 1932

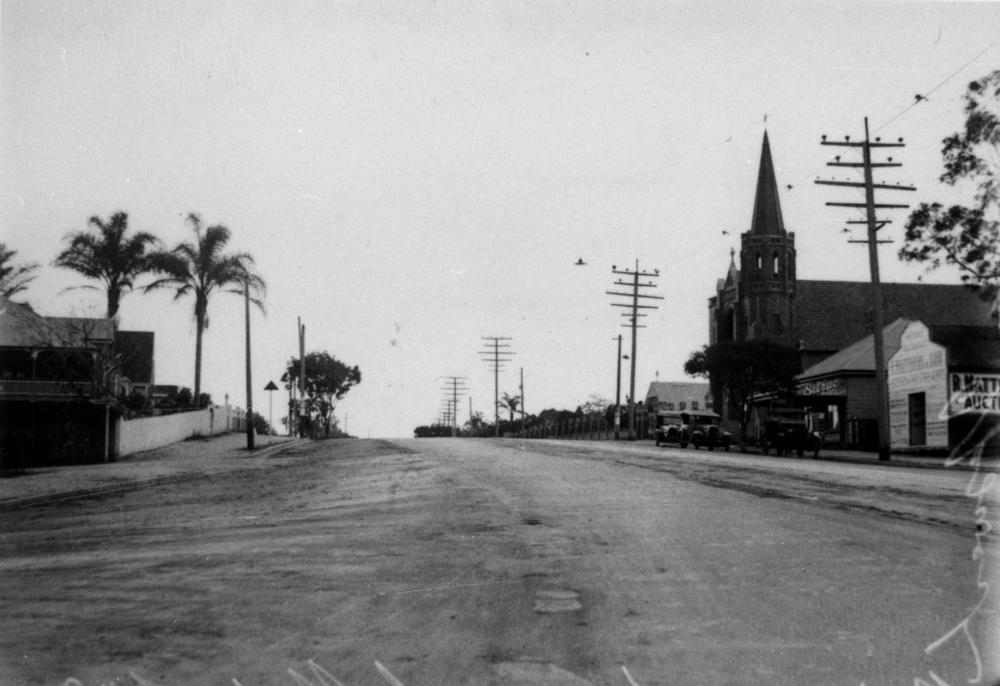
Ipswich Road in 1937

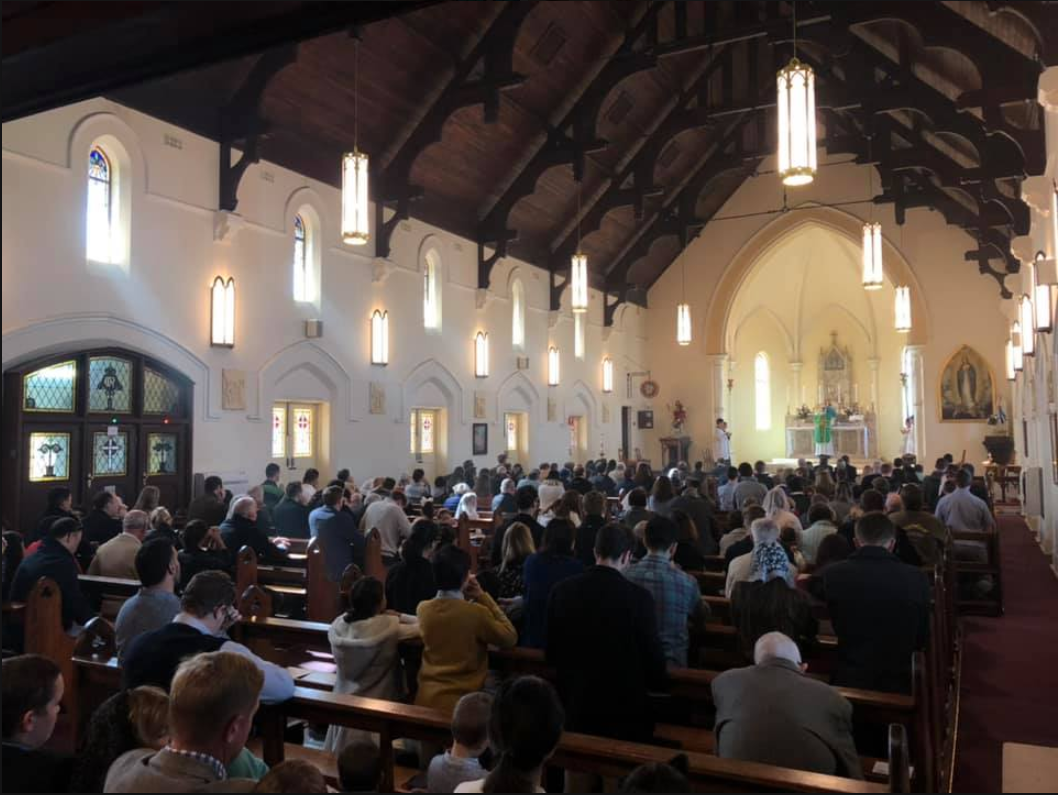
Interior of Church today during a Sung Latin Mass with Confessions being heard

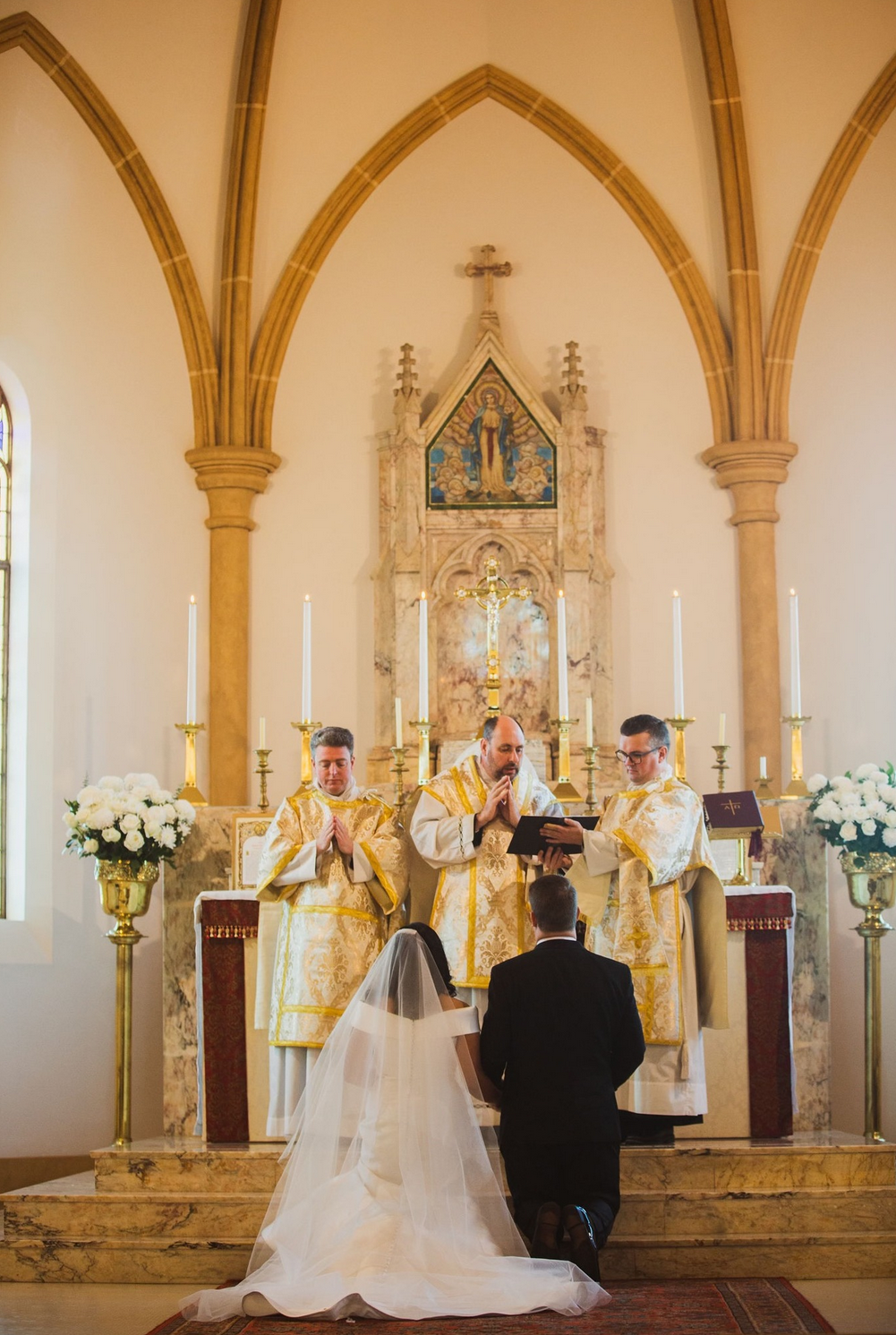
Wedding Blessing

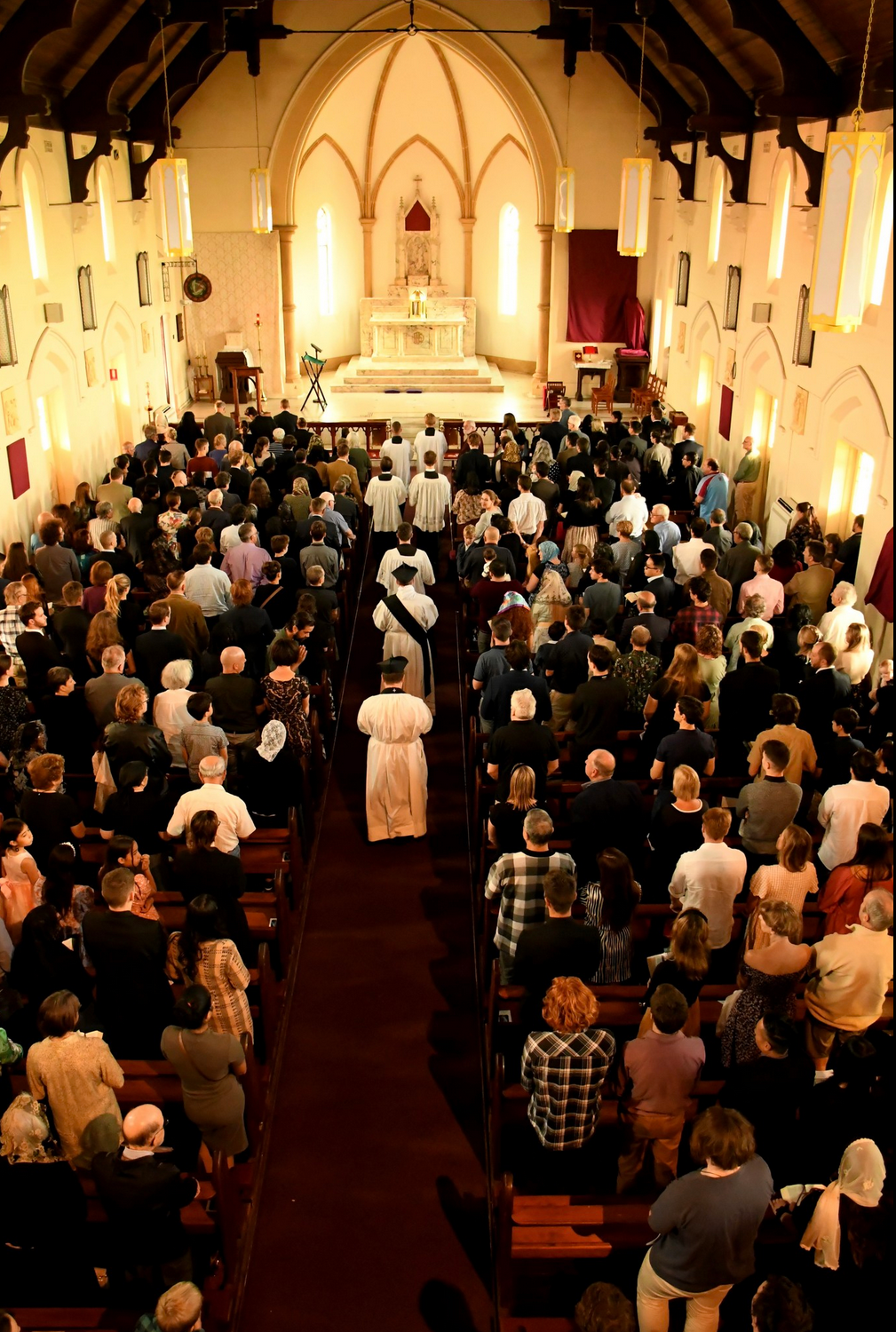
Good Friday Ceremony

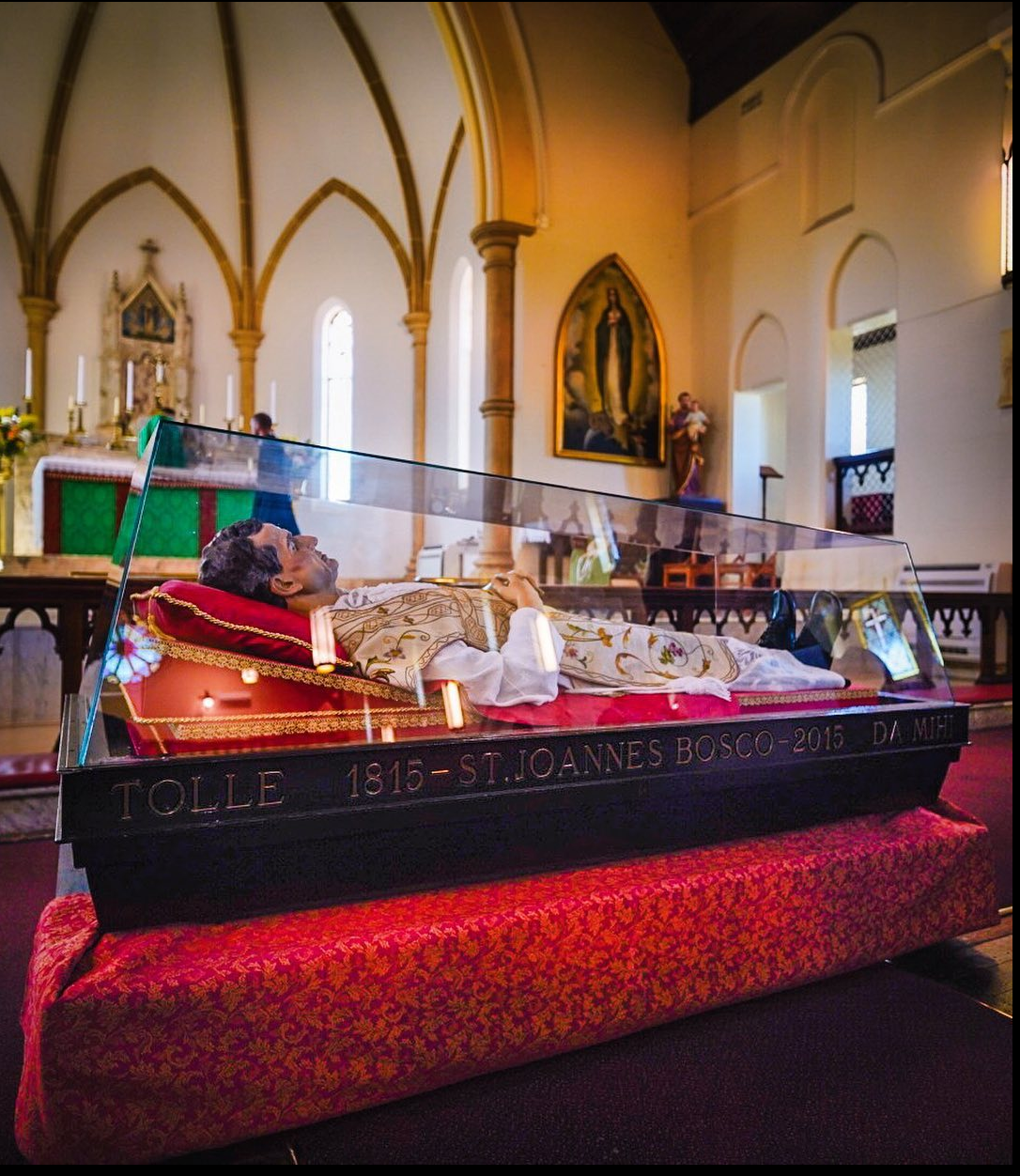
Visit of the St John Bosco relic

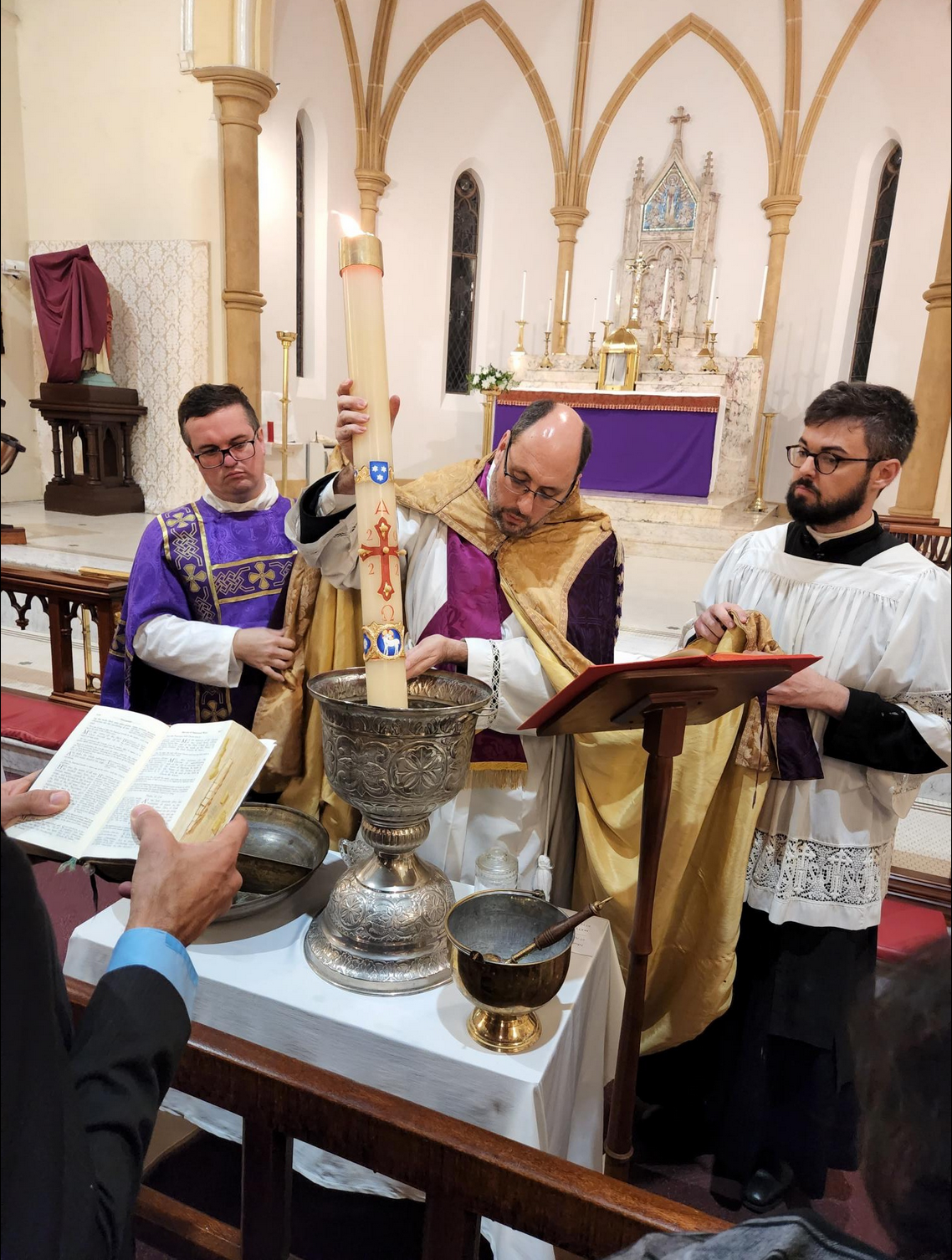
Blessing of the Baptismal water in the Easter Vigil

== Treasures ==
The High Altar was completed in 1941 with all money raised by the parishioners. The original timber altars which were used in both churches were built by local parishioners and transferred to Stuartholme after the installation of the current marble altar. The gold used for the Tabernacle key chain was donated by school student, Madeline Freney who had received a gold academic medal. She went on to become a Carmelite nun.

In 1920, the parishioners built a grand iron and brick fence along the Ipswich Road frontage. The fence has since been modified by removing the gate, the iron rods and large brick pillars. The small white marble plaques attached to each post list the names of the parishioners who donated bricks.

The church pews were donated by individual parishioners in 1932 are made of high-quality silky oak timber.

The Church Clock was donated in 1941 by Edward Albert Byrne in memory of his sister Bridget who died in 1936. The three fish on the face represent the Blessed Trinity and move in the direction of the hands of the clock, forever going forward, drawing man unceasingly towards our destiny. The fish are on a dark blue-green background specked with red, grey, white and silver to represent deep space – the sea of the universe. The fish symbol was used by early Christians to point to places where the Eucharist was celebrated. The twelve stars on the clock represent the twelve apostles. They are coloured red to represent the blood of the martyrs. The frame is made of wrought iron and includes the word ‘Christ’ in Greek/Byzantine.

The 2014 Brisbane Hailstorm caused damage to the church roof and flooding. The carpet was required to be dumped and replaced whilst the original marble floor was refurbished. Altar rails were returned to the church in 2018 and were a similar design to the original design.

The large oil painting of the Blessed Virgin was painted over 100 years ago by Sacred Heart nun, Mother Mary Zahel. A school pupil, Rita de Lange was used to pose for the face. The painting has adorned both churches.

=== Gallery ===
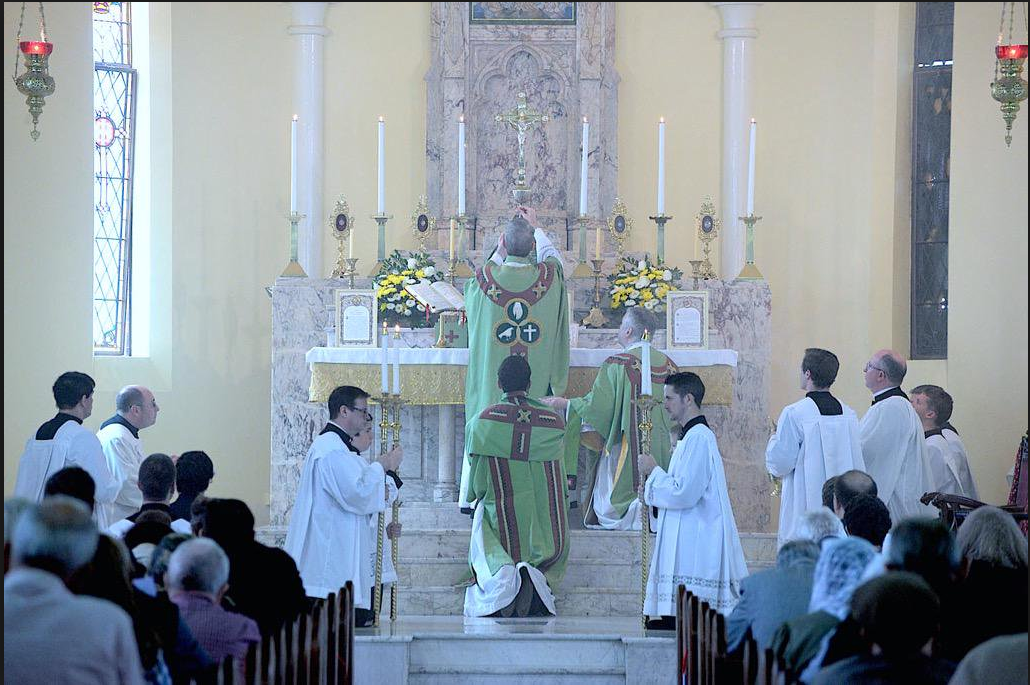
The High Altar was installed in 1941.

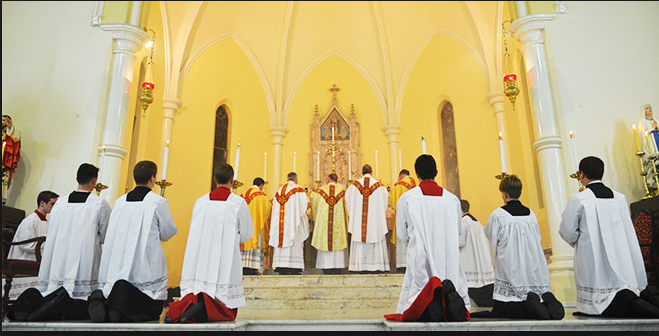
Archbishop Mark Coleridge celebrating Mass

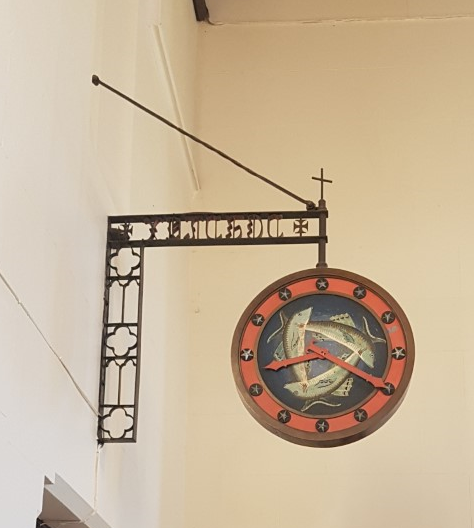
The Clock was installed in 1941.

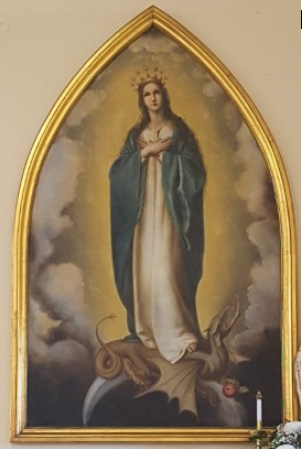
The large oil painting of the Blessed Virgin was painted over 100 years ago by Sacred Heart nun, Mother Mary Zahel. A school pupil, Rita de Lange was used to pose for the face. The painting has adorned both churches.

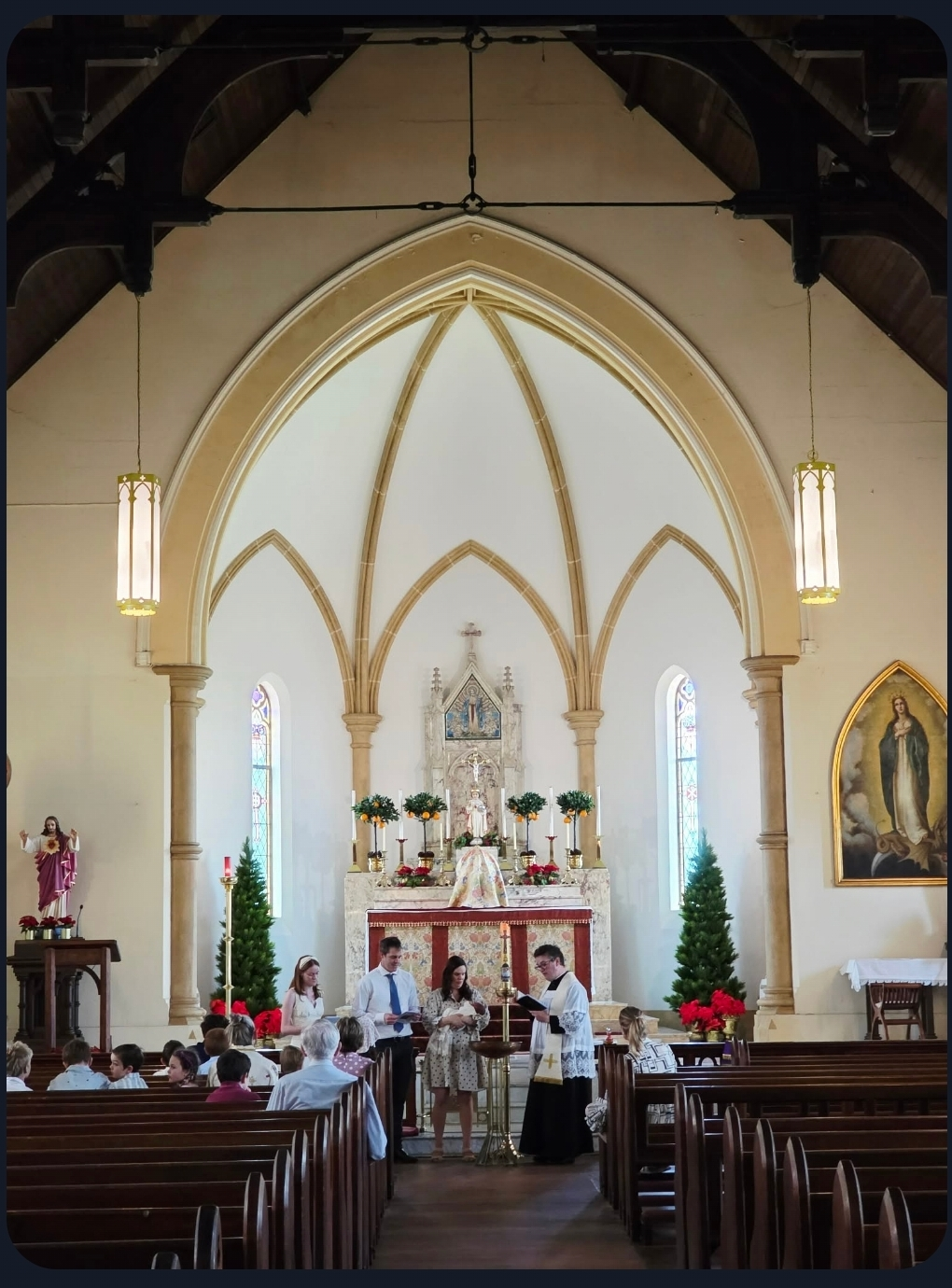
Sacrament of Baptism

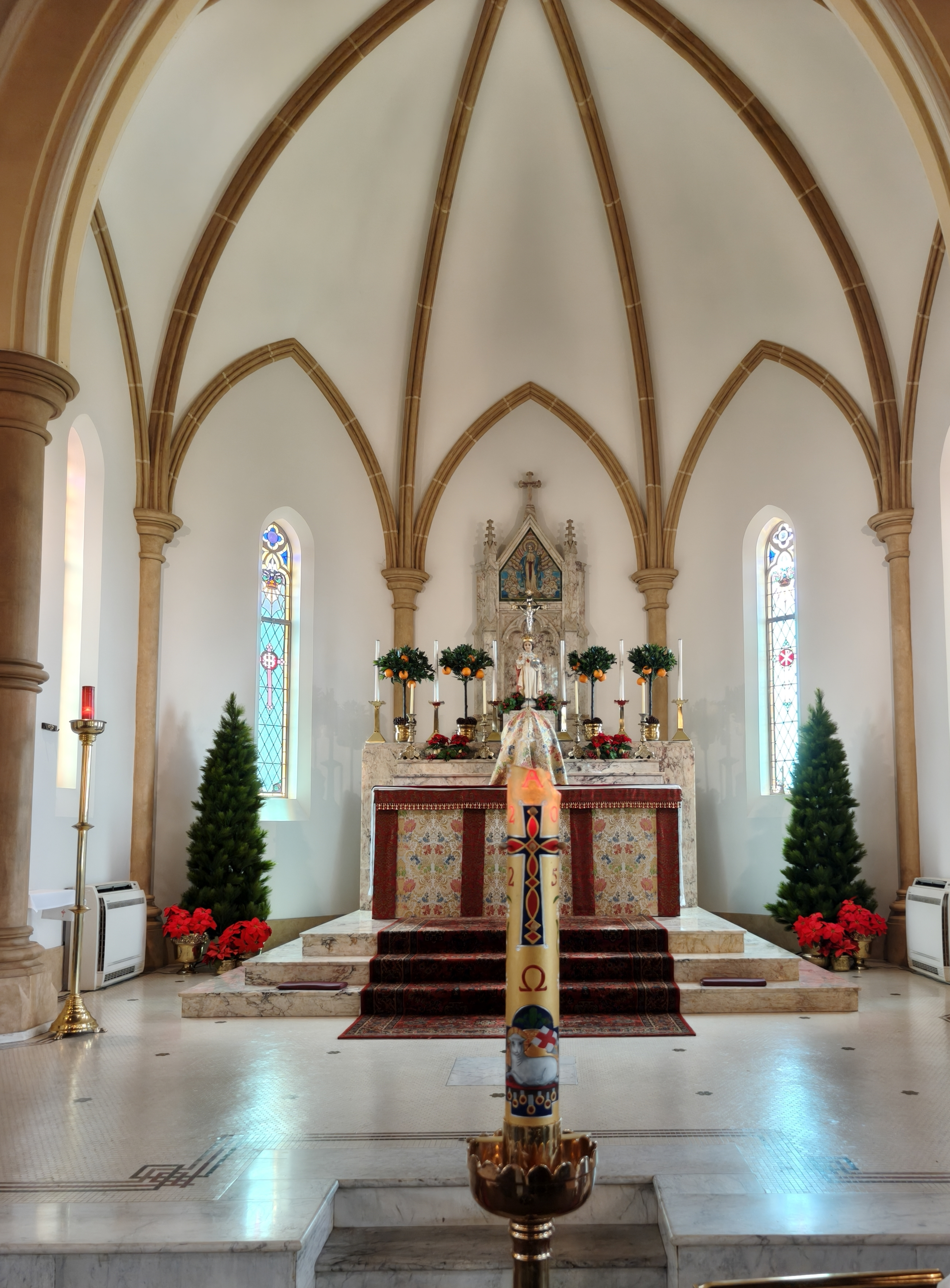
Altar during Advent

== Annerley Ekibin Parish ==
Mary Immaculate Church was originally named the Ipswich Road Parish until it was combined with the Ekibin Parish by Archbishop John Bathersby on 30 November 2003. The Parish includes the church of St John Fisher and the St Elizabeth's Chapel. The parish has been under the care of the Brisbane Oratory in Formation since 2014.

St John Fisher Church was built in 1960 and originally named St Pius X. It was refurbished in 2003. The refurbishment included the repositioning of the altar and lectern to the centre of the church and arranging the seating into a ‘fishbone’ pattern. The church was returned to the original arrangement in 2014.

The first Mass in Ekibin was celebrated in 1947 in an old weatherboard house on the site of the current St Elizabeth's chapel. Effingham Street was still a dirt road and Fr John Torpie, the first Parish Priest was living with his mum due to the lack of a presbytery. In 1951, Fr Basil Bergin was appointed and immediately set to building the church and school simultaneously. The parishioners undertook a large fundraising project and many spent their Saturdays working on the church and school. Archbishop Duhig blessed and opened the church in 1955 and the school in 1958. A future church was planned for the corner of Effingham St and Cracknell Rd however the owner refused to sell initially and the land was subsequently used by the school for a playground. Controversially, the church was closed in 2005 and converted into a chapel and classrooms

The parish holds numerous parishioners who have found a vocation to the priesthood and religious life. This has included over 16 priests, two religious brothers and in excess of 25 religious women.

=== Saint Vincent de Paul Society ===
Annerley Ekibin Parish operates two SVDP Branches. The Mary Immaculate Branch was established in 1922 by Parish Priest, Father James Gallagher and the group met weekly after Friday night Benediction. The Ekibin Branch has existed for well over 50 years and is based out of St John Fisher and St Elizabeth's.

The Branches have provided house visits and material goods to people across Brisbane. Special works have included: helping the poor in the Tarragindi Pensioner Shanty Town during the depression, helping transport the disabled from the ‘Blind Deaf and Dumb Institute’ to Mass and assisting with the works of the now defunct Parish Scouts and Cubs group whose den was situated on Parish grounds.

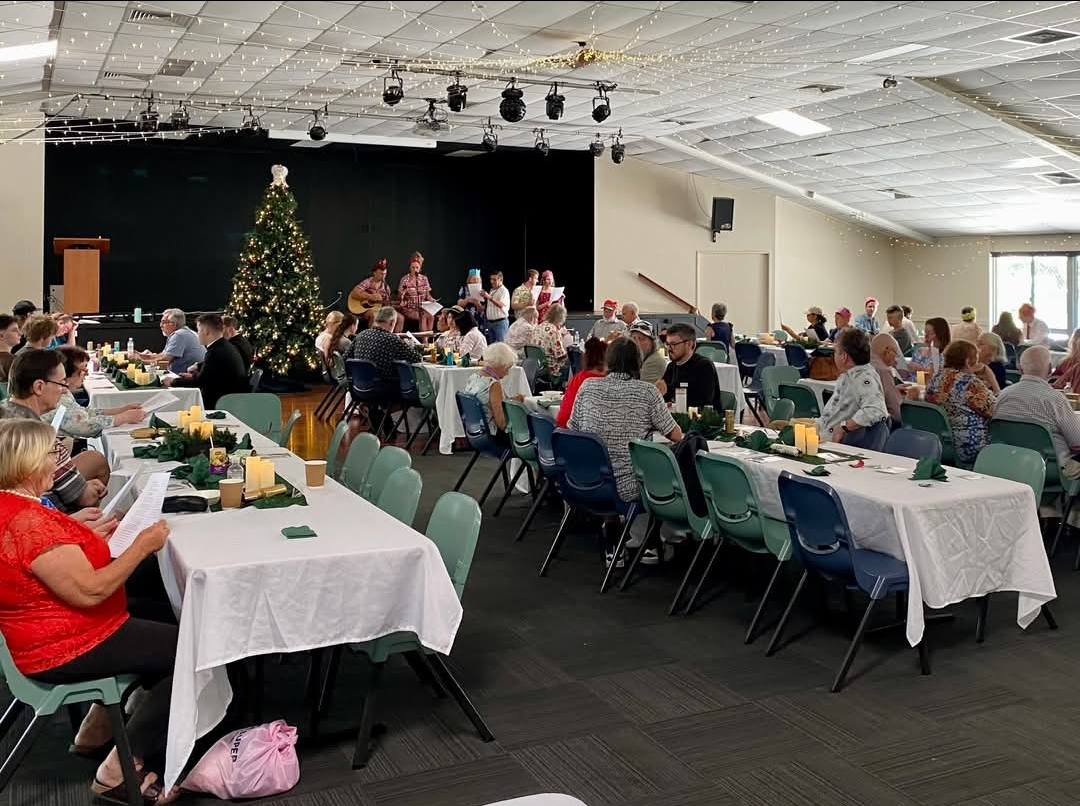
SVDP Christmas Day Lunch

Over 300 parishioners have volunteered over the years.

=== Mary Immaculate Hall ===
The Parish hall has previously been known as Marymac Hall and the Marymac Community Centre. Completed in 1978, the Parish hall regularly holds large events such as Christmas Markets, school assemblies for Our Lady's College and parish events including, dances and Frassati Verso L’alto.

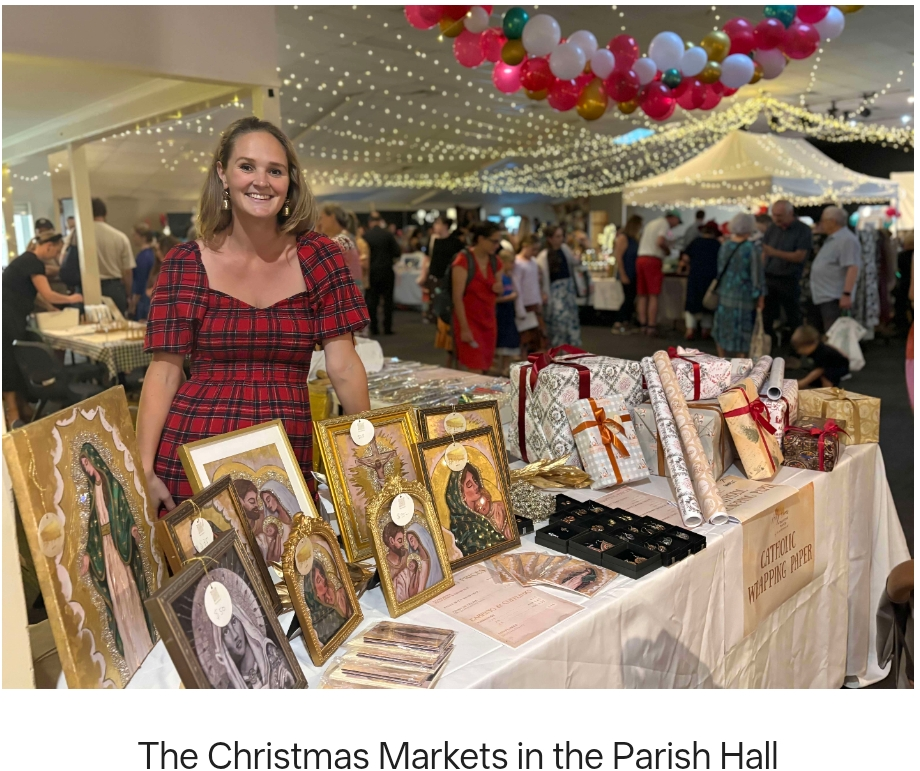
Christmas Markets

The hall previously held a weekly bingo every Wednesday up until the 1990s and was supported by over 50 parish volunteers at any time. In 2004 the parish contributed $30 000 to refurbishing the hall.

=== Mary 'Mac Parish Magazine (1978–2003) ===
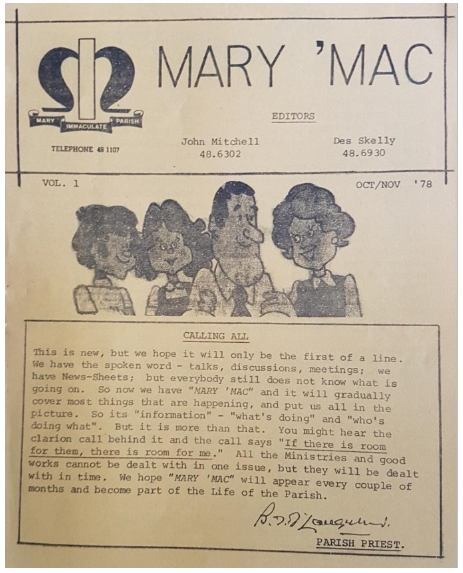
Front page of the first issue published in 1978

The Mary Mac magazine was published bi-monthly for 25 years and edited by a small group of parishioners. The magazine reported on all facets of parish and school life. It also told the story of many of our parishioners. The magazine also reported on things such as: who just had a baby, who just graduated university and who was going on an overseas trip. Mary ‘Mac magazine was produced at a time before the internet and was a source for local and international Catholic news.The 151 editions of the magazine provides a chronicle on Catholic parish life in Brisbane from the post Vatican II era up until the end of the Pope John Paul II papacy. All 151 editions are held in the parish archives.

=== Mary Immaculate Employment Group ===
The group was established in 1991 by the parish to assist with reducing unemployment in the community. After a few short years the Group had placed over 1000 unemployed people into work. The group disbanded in 1995.

=== Holy Name Society ===
The Holy Name Society was one of the most active organisations for men in the parish. It provided religious instruction to men and challenged them to live a Christian life in a hostile world. The society also made reparation for the blasphemy and perjury.

The society was in nearly every parish in Australia, New Zealand and the United States. It was active at Mary Immaculate Church for the first 40 years and ceased around 1970. The reason given in a 1982 parish document was, "It was about this time that the Society in most parishes simply lapsed over a period- not by any definite decision but by a post Vatican II feeling that a great society had already finished its work and would be replaced.”

An honour board is situated on the rear of the church and includes 71 names of deceased members of the society up to 1970.

=== Sisters of the Sacred Heart ===
The Sisters of the Sacred Heart established the convent and the primary school at Annerley.

In the mid 1900s, Melbourne Archbishop Daniel Mannix wrote to Mother Salmon of the RSCJ requesting that they establish a school in Brisbane, "I am confident that there is a great opening for the Sisters in Brisbane and you could not find anywhere a finer type of Catholic people. God's hand is in the change that your are making and He will look after the success of the work that He is giving you to do."

Archbishop Duhig was excited at the impending arrival of the Sisters as he was concerned about the quality of education being provided in secular schools. The Archbishop personally drove the nuns to the new convent and it was recorded in a private journal that he gleefully ran up the steps of the new convent, opened the door and generously welcomed the new nuns to their new home.

Six nuns of the RSCJ established the Ipswich Road Convent in 1917 during tough times as Brisbane was experiencing heat wave conditions and the convent was without furniture. The nuns were able to secure a special item which was a cedar cupboard which was made from the tree under which St Madeleine Sophie had sat. This was later transferred to the new convent at Stuartholme.

It seems the nuns were not fond off Fr Gallagher's horse which they described as a 'woman hater,' and which chose to sleep under the convent, to their despair.

The Sisters remained until 1919 when they moved to their new convent Stuartholme at the request of Archbishop Duhig and established Stuartholme School in Toowong, Brisbane. The Sisters presented a silver chalice to the parish which had inscribed on the base, "Given to the Church of Mary Immaculate in memory of Mother Kathleen O'Donovan, Religious of the Sacred Heart of Jesus, who died January 17th, 1919"

=== Sisters of St Joseph ===
In January 1920, the Sisters of Saint Joseph took over the Convent and school. They also participated in the establishment Our Lady's College Annerley in 1964 initially with 78 pupils. The sisters also assisted in the parish by preparing children for the sacraments and teaching catechism. The sisters also worked with children from the School for the Deaf and Dumb at Dutton Park.

The Sisters established a Mary Mackillop Centre in 1995 within their convent. An average of 9000 people attended each year and were able to view relics, paintings and audio recordings. Local parishioners assisted as tour guides. The Sisters closed the centre in 2014.

Whilst working at the ANZ Bank Brisbane in 1968, parishioner Des Skelly who was also educated by the Sisters of St Joseph as a child in Crows Nest located the specimen signature of Saint Mary Mackillop inside a banking book which she had signed. The paperwork which was dated 5 July 1878 was completed by her to open a banking account for the first Josephite House in Queensland. The entry read: "1878 ---July 5 (862) MARY MACKILLOP – Superior General of the Order of St. Joseph, Kensingtion, Adelaide."

Des Skelly arranged for the entry to be framed and presented to the Sisters at Nundah, Brisbane. It is now located at the St Mary Mackillop Museum at Mount Street, Sydney. The sisters vacated the convent and handed it over to the priests and brothers of the Brisbane Oratory in Formation in 2014.

=== Catholic Enquiry Group ===
This group is for adults who wish to enquire and/or prepare to be received into the Church and become Catholic and Catholics who wish to reconnect with their faith.

== The Brisbane Oratory in Formation ==
The Brisbane Oratory in Formation is the first Australian Congregation of the Oratory of St. Philip Neri.

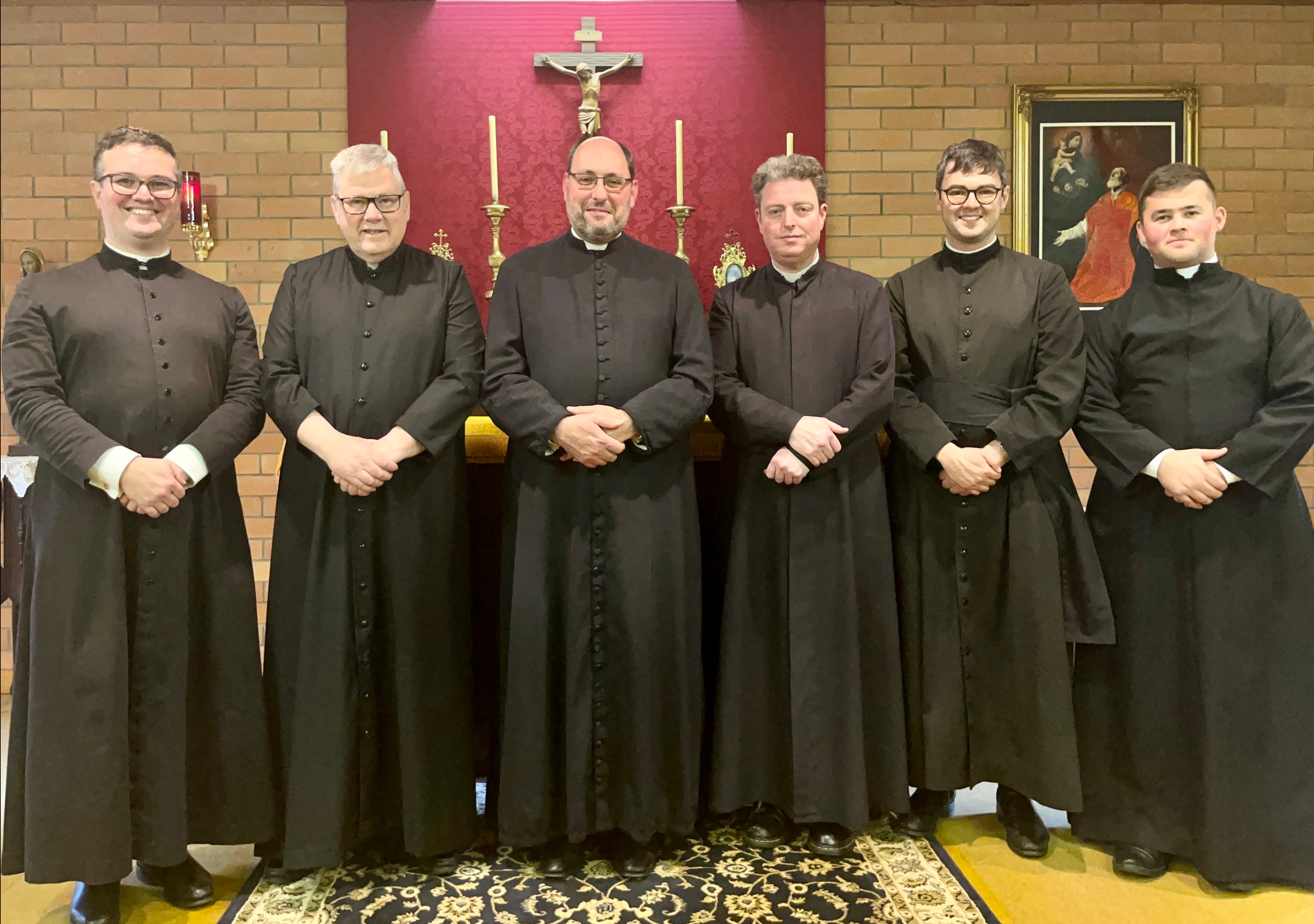
Priests and Brothers of the Oratory

The Brisbane Oratory in Formation consists of a community of priests, and brothers who are in training for the priesthood, from all over Australia who have come together under the patronage of Our Lady, Saint Philip Neri, Saint John Henry Newman and Saint Pier Giorgio Frassati.

'Oratory House' is home to the priests and brothers of the Brisbane Oratory in Formation. It is situated near the rear of the church on Ferndale Street and was originally built in 1970 as a convent for the Sisters of Saint Joseph until they vacated in 2014.

The Oratory holds an annual fundraising dinner to raise funds for the education of seminarians.

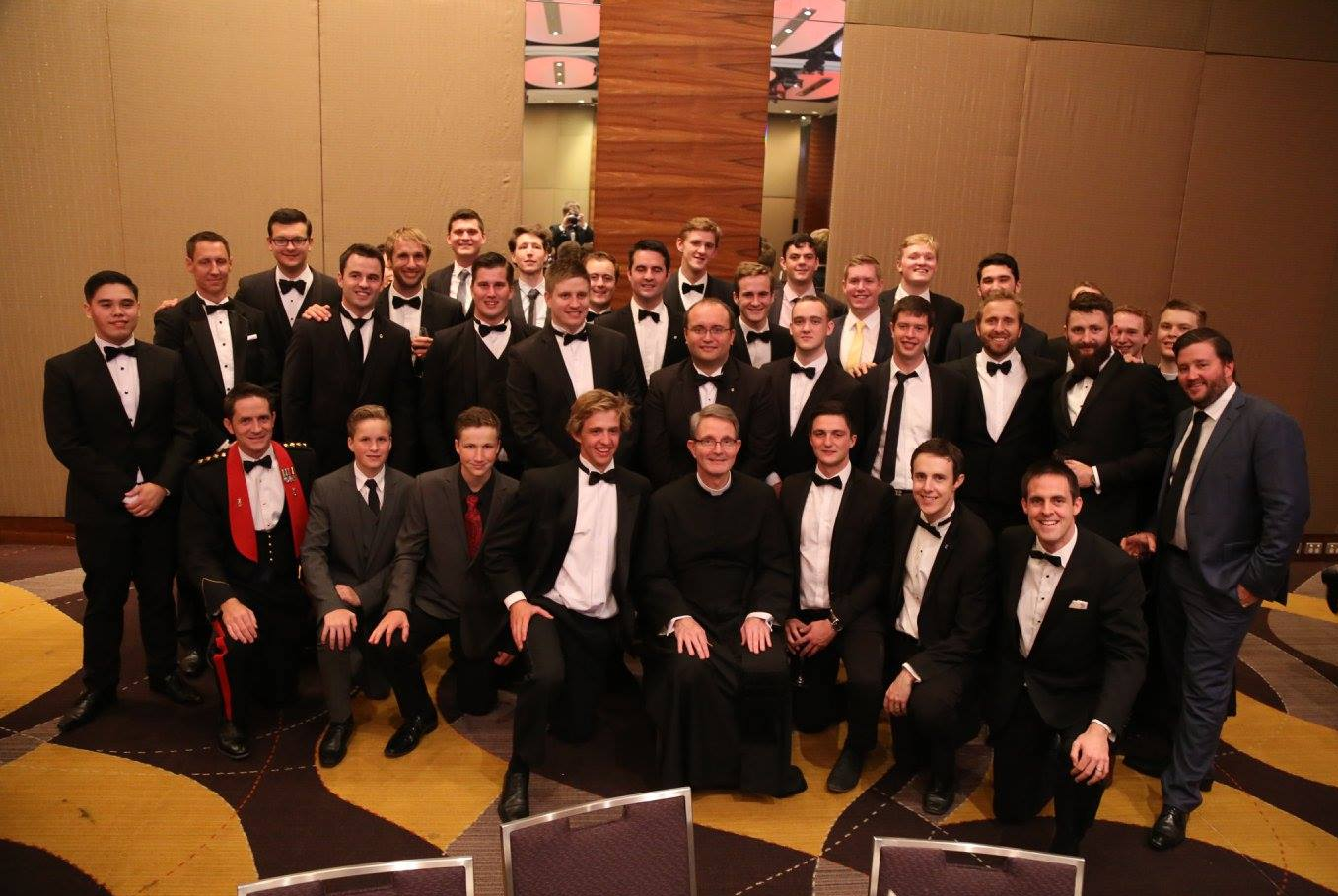
Annual Valicella Dinner

=== Men’s and Women’s Secular Oratory ===
The Secular Oratories are inspired by St Philip Neri and consist of a separate Men's and Women's Secular Oratory which are under the guidance of the Oratory priests. Regular evening sessions are held and include the classic model of mental prayer and religious instruction.

=== Frassati Australia ===
In 2011, Fr Paul Chandler and five young Brisbane Catholic men established Frassati Australia with the aim of assisting young men to authentically live the Catholic faith, and discern and respond to their God-given vocation.

Inspired by Blessed Pier Giorgio Frassati and under the spiritual leadership of the Brisbane Oratory in Formation, Frassati Australia is committed to assisting the parish in a variety of ways including Altar Serving, participating in sacred music and holding weekly spiritual talks. The group also meets monthly for a communal meal at the Norman Hotel. Some members live in community together in Frassati Houses and regularly eat and socialise together whilst also participating in daily prayer together. Over 50 young men from across Australia and the world have lived in a Frassati House.

Frassati Australia has since inspired the establishment of Frassati Melbourne in Victoria and Frassati Sydney in New South Wales.

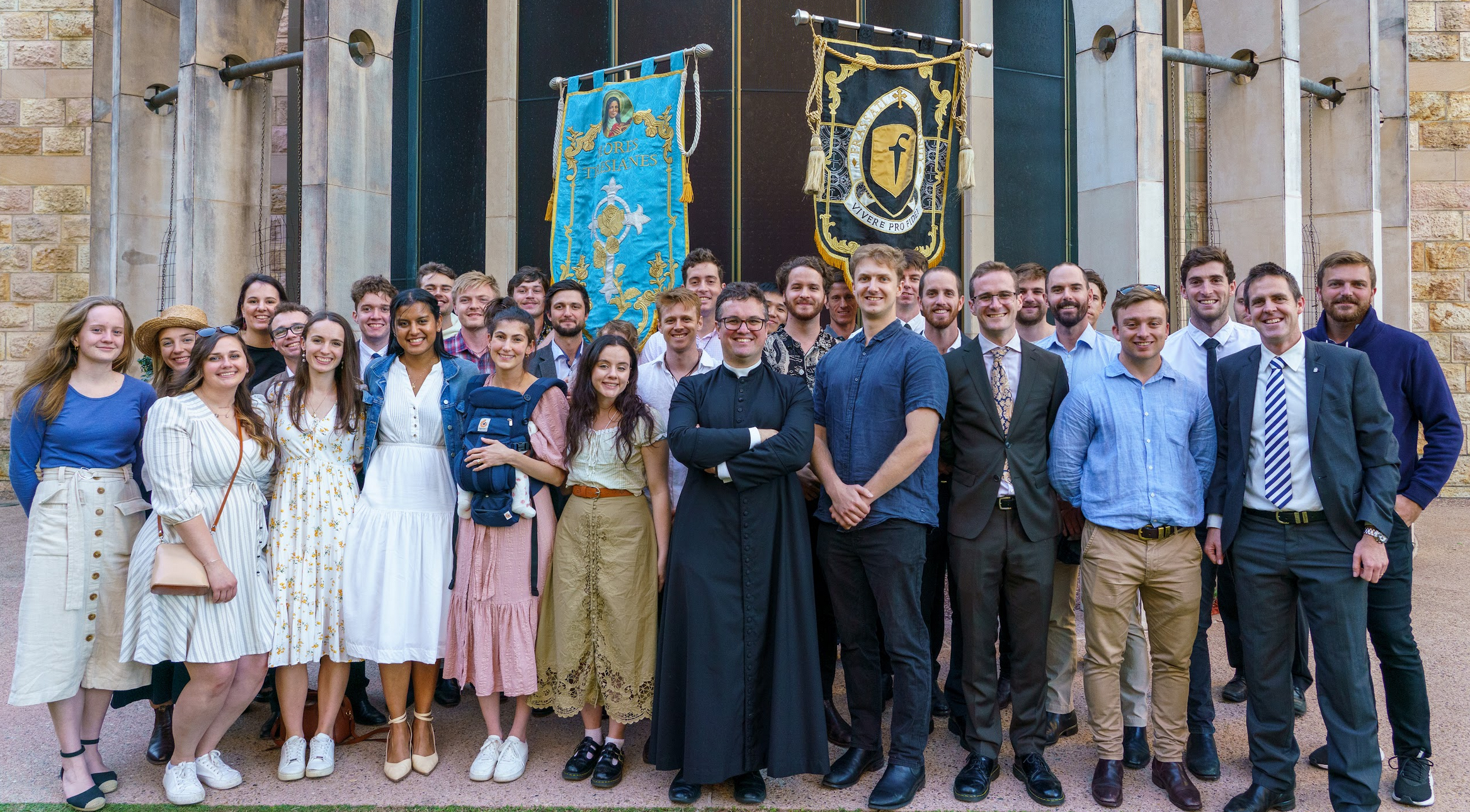
Frassati and Flores Teresianes members with Fr Conor Power

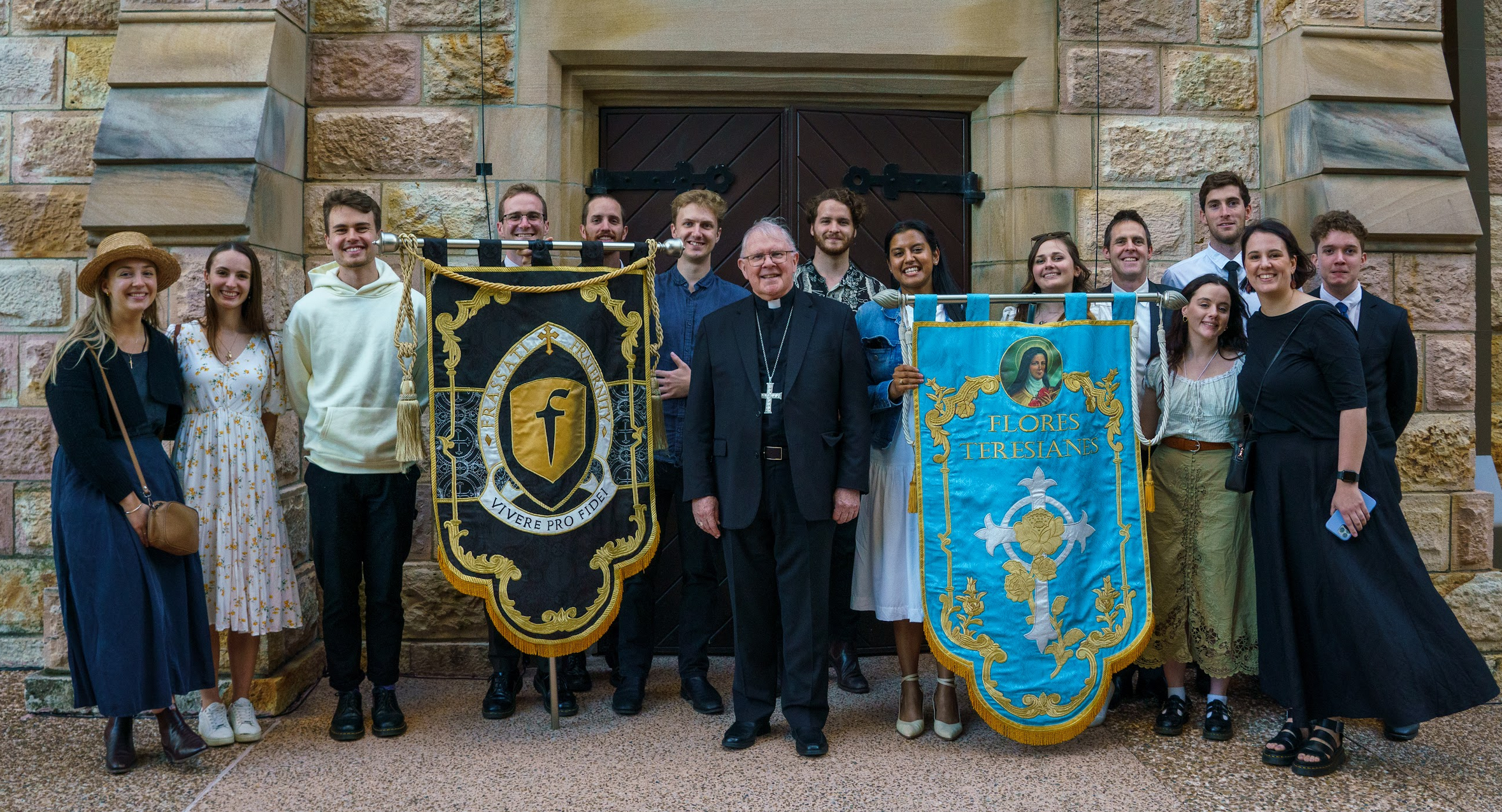
Frassati and Flores Teresianes members with Archbishop Coleridge

=== Flores Teresianes for Young Women ===
‘Flores’ is a group for young single and married women, eighteen and older, who want to help each other grow in virtue and grow closer to God by living the fullness of the Catholic Faith and by embracing the gift of spiritual motherhood. Flores Teresianes Young Women meet every month for a dinner and a short talk and also come together for retreat days and other occasional activities.

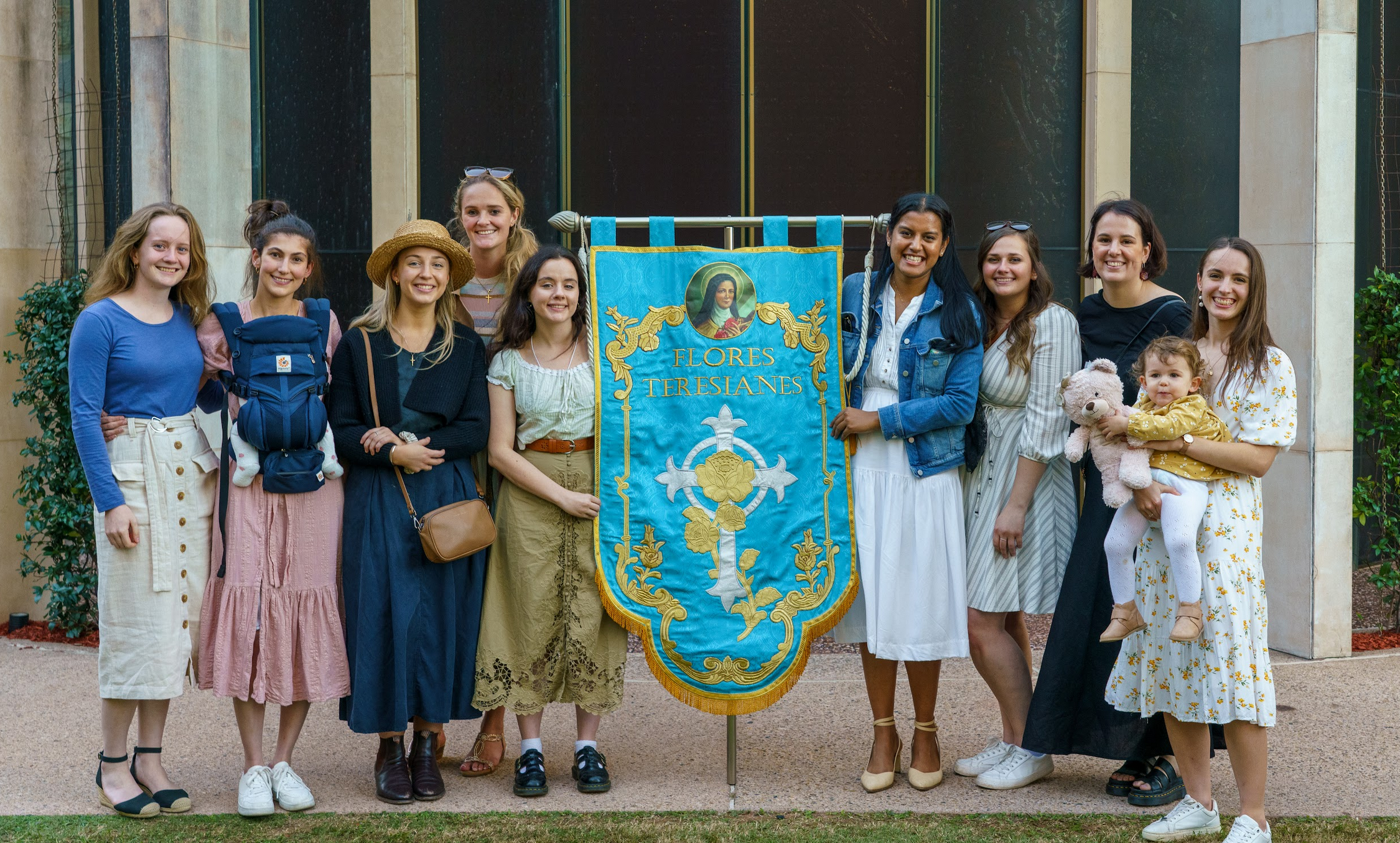
Member of Flores Teresianes

=== Juventus Frassati Youth Group ===
Juventus Frassati Youth seeks to Inspire holiness and virtue in high school-aged youth. The youth group provides an opportunity for young boys and girls to make holy and virtuous friendships, learn a little about the faith, and have good and virtuous youth leaders to look up to. The youth group meets Friday each Fortnight during term at St Elizabeth's School.

=== Verso L’Alto – Young Adult Evenings ===
Frassati Verso L’Alto (To the top) are evenings of formation for young men and women under the direction of the Brisbane Oratory in Formation and Frassati Australia. The evenings begin with Mass and are followed by a talk.

Frassati Verso L’Alto was established in 2012 by the men of Frassati. The group has hosted numerous internationally acclaimed guest speakers including Matthew Arnold, John Pridmore and Michael Voris. Talks have also been conducted by numerous religious and members of the group.

The group originally met at St Joseph's Kangaroo Point under the guidance of Fr Paul Chandler. The need for a larger venue saw it move to its current location with the establishment of the Brisbane Oratory in 2013. Each Oratory Priest has been a Spiritual Director of the group.

Today, over 500 young Catholics are part of the online group and under the patronage of Blessed Pier Giorgio Frassati the group continues to meet.

=== The Oratory Book Club ===
The Oratory Book Club meets monthly to discuss the Catholic literature of past and present.

=== Brisbane Oratory Music ===
The Brisbane Oratory Choir and Schola, as well as invited guests on special occasions, provide sacred chant and polyphony principally for the celebration of the Sacred Liturgy, but also for the oratorio concerts which are performed from time to time.

== Churches & Schools ==
=== St John Henry Newman College & St John Fisher Church ===
St John Henry Newman College & St John Fisher Church are located at 17 Messines Ridge Road, Tarragindi, Brisbane. It was established by Catholic families seeking a classical, faith-based educational alternative, inspired by the educational philosophy of St John Henry Newman (1801–1890) and his emphasis on the formation of the whole person through a liberal education. The college follows a classical education model grounded in the Western liberal arts tradition, with a curriculum emphasising literature, history, languages including Latin, and the integration of faith and reason to foster wisdom, virtue, and a lifelong love of learning.[1]

The college opened in 2026, with Archbishop the most Rev Shane Mackinlay celebrating the official opening Mass which was followed by a keynote address by the Hon Tony Abbott AC, the 28th Prime Minister of Australia. It is initially enrolling students from Prep to Year 3, with plans to expand to a full Prep to Year 12 school across separate primary and secondary campuses. Its first campus occupies land within the grounds of St John Fisher Catholic Church in Tarragindi, a site reserved for Catholic education since the 1960s. The original building on the site was constructed in 1960 as a war memorial church, initially named St Pius X, before later being renamed St John Fisher Catholic Church. The site also intended to include a primary school, a presbytery and convent.

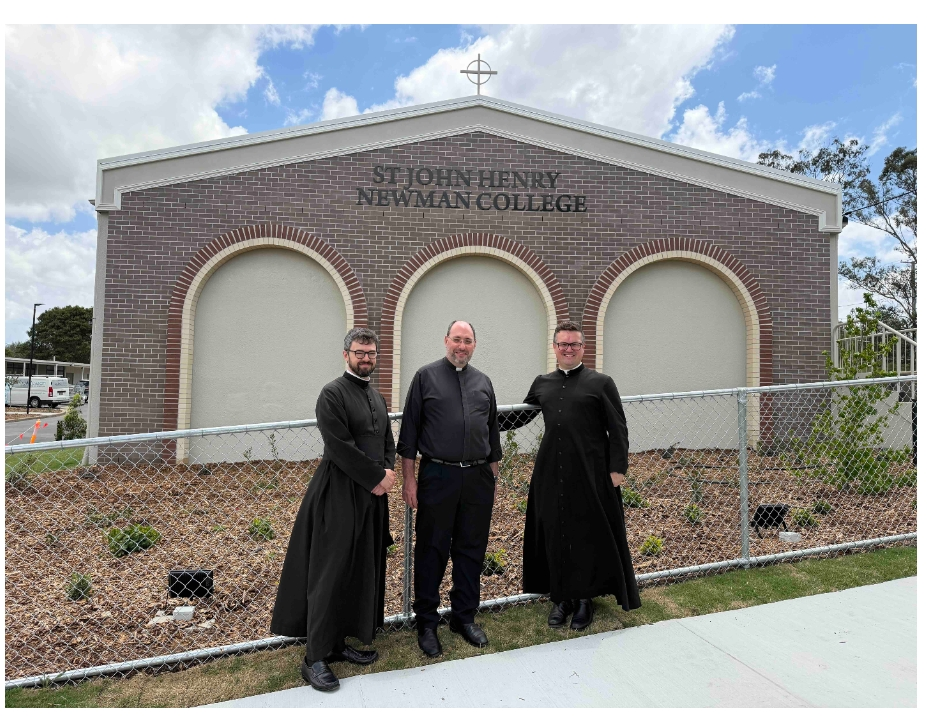
St John Henry Newman College

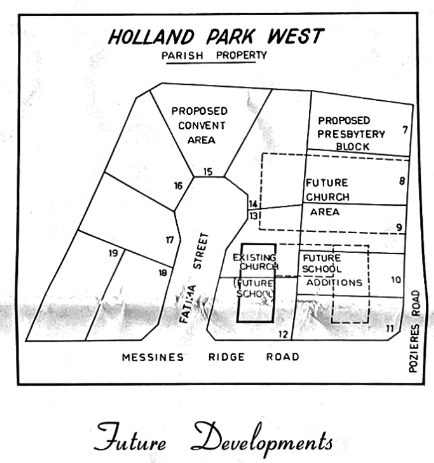
St John Fisher Future Development Plans 1961 Opening Mass St John Henry Newman College Opening Mass

=== St Elizabeth's Chapel ===
St Elizabeth's Chapel is situated at 61 Effingham Street, Tarragindi. It was opened as a church in 1955 with Fr Basil Bergin the original priest. Prior to the building of the Church, Masses had been celebrated in a converted house in Effingham Street, one of two that had been purchased in 1947. In 2005, then parish priest, Fr John Worthington and Archbishop John Bathersby arranged for the Church to be transferred into a Chapel. In 2020, the Parish commenced Perpetual Adoration at the chapel.

=== St Elizabeth's School ===
Fr Basil Bergin was motivated to establish a school following the building of St Elizabeth's Church. He would lead the congregation with three Hail Mary's asking God to send nuns at the end of each Mass. The original school uniform for girls was a heavy brown tunic, with a white shirt, white socks and a brown velour hat. St Elizabeth's Catholic Primary School opened its doors on 25 February 1958.

Three Presentation Sisters - Emmanuel, Carmel, and Raphael - were welcomed by the Parish Priest, Father Basil Bergin and Archbishop Duhig.

The school commenced with 77 children in Years 1 to 3. At the present time the school has two classes in each year level from Prep to Year 6. The enrolment is relatively stable at just under 400 children.

Today, St Elizabeth's School is recognised within the community for offering a quality Catholic Primary School education.

=== Mary Immaculate Catholic Primary School ===
Mary Immaculate Catholic Primary School was opened by the Sisters of the Sacred Heart on 30 April 1917, on the site where the Marymac Community Centre now stands. It was originally called the Ipswich Road Convent School and lessons took place in the church building during the week. After two years, the Sacred Heart Sisters moved to Stuartholme, to be replaced by the Sisters of St Joseph (1919). The name of the school was then changed to St Joseph's Convent School. In 1932, when the present church was built, classrooms were included in the lower section to cater for increasing numbers. In the 1950s the name was changed once again, to Mary Immaculate Catholic Primary School, in line with the name of the church. In 1954, the double storey block of classrooms, including the Administration Area, was built. Enrolments peaked in the 1960s with approximately 500 students, and began to decline in the 1980s due to changing demographics in the local area. The current enrolment is 146 from Prep – Year 6. The Sisters of St Joseph continued to run the school for 72 years (1919–1991). The first lay Principal was appointed in January 1991.

=== Our Lady’s College ===
Our Lady's College is a secondary Girls which was established by the then Parish Priest, Monsignor James Kelly and the parish community in 1964. It is dedicated to Mary, the Mother of God. The college was originally run by the Sisters of St. Joseph who were already running the adjoining primary school. Monsignor Kelly idea to build the school faced opposition due to the financial cost and the difficulty in operating a high school. His response was, ‘Nothing is impossible with God.’

In 1976 it came under the auspices of the Brisbane Catholic Education Centre and has been conducted since then as a Brisbane Archdiocesan College.`
