= Vidi aquam =

Gregorian chant

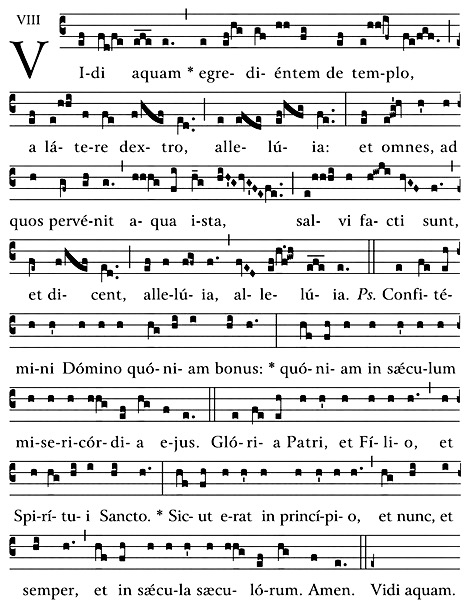
Vidi Aquam

Vidi aquam is an antiphon, which may be sung before the Tridentine Mass on Sundays, or either before or at the beginning (in place of the Penitential Rite) of the Mass of Paul VI according to the 2002 rubrics. It accompanies the Asperges, the ritual at the beginning of Mass where the celebrating priest sprinkles the congregation with baptismal water.

It is sung from Easter Sunday throughout the liturgical season of Eastertide until the feast of Pentecost. It replaces the simpler antiphon Asperges me, which is used outside Eastertide.

== Text and translation ==
Text	Translation
Vidi aquam egredientem de templo, a latere dextro, Alleluia: Et omnes ad quos pervenit aqua ista, salvi facti sunt, Et dicent: Alleluia, Alleluia.	I saw water flowing out of the Temple, from its right side, Alleluia: And all to whom this water came were saved, And they shall say: Alleluia, Alleluia.

The text refers to the words of the prophet Ezekiel (Ezekiel 47:1), who saw the waters gushing forth from the Temple as a sanctifying flood that flows eastward through the earth and purifies the sea:

And he brought me again to the gate of the house, and behold waters issued out from under the threshold of the house toward the east: for the forefront, of the house looked toward the east: but the waters came down to the right side of the temple to the south part of the altar.

The text also refers to the words of John the Apostle in John 19:34, who saw the waters gushing forth from the right side of Christ (as the Temple).

But one of the soldiers with a spear opened his side, and immediately there came out blood and water.

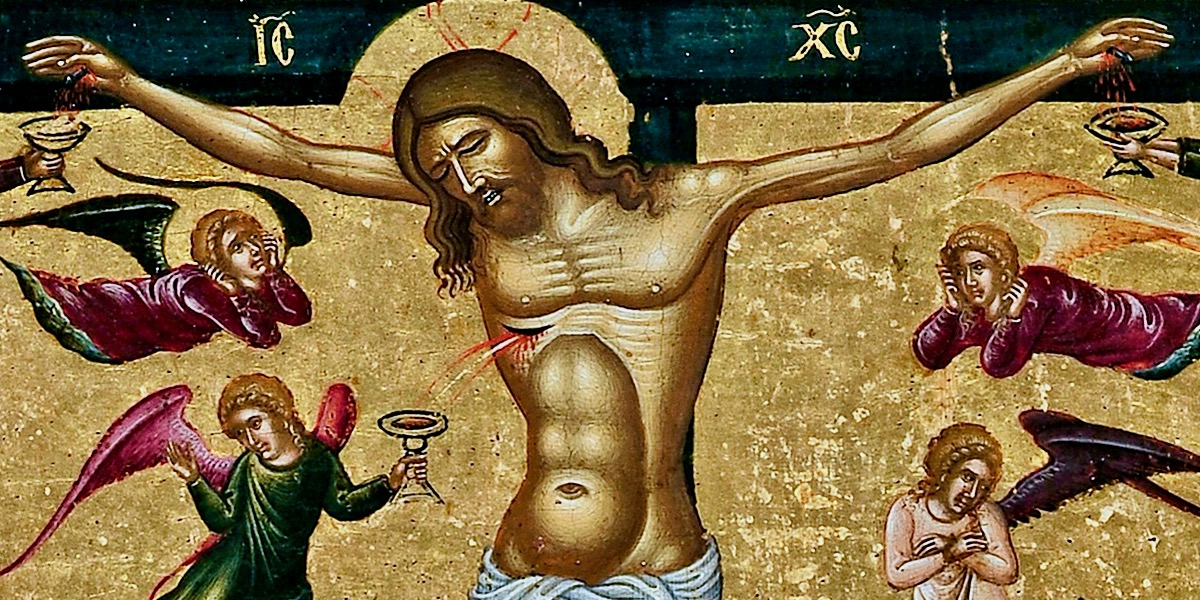

During this hymn, the reference to Ezekiel 47:1 and John 19:34 is then followed by Psalm 117 and Gloria Patri. It is customary that during the Gloria Patri, those present should bow their heads to revere the Holy Trinity. It is not uncommon that throughout the liturgical season of Eastertide, the Priest will stop the sprinkling of the Holy Water to turn around and make this bow towards the Tabernacle.

Collectively, the entire antiphon translates to:

Text	Translation
Vidi aquam egredientem de templo, a latere dextro, Alleluia: Et omnes ad quos pervenit aqua ista, salvi facti sunt, Et dicent: Alleluia, Alleluia. Confitemini Domino, quoniam bonus, quoniam in sæculum misericordia ejus. Gloria Patri, et Filio, et Spiritui Sancto, Sicut erat in principio, et nunc, et semper, et in sæcula sæculorum. Amen. Vidi aquam egredientem de templo, a latere dextro, Alleluia: Et omnes ad quos pervenit aqua ista, salvi facti sunt, Et dicent: Alleluia, Alleluia.	I saw water flowing out of the Temple, from its right side, Alleluia: And all to whom this water came were saved, And they shall say: Alleluia, Alleluia. Give thanks to the Lord for he is good for his mercy is forever. Glory to the Father, and to the Son, and to the Holy Spirit, As it was in the beginning, is now, and ever shall be, unto ages of ages. Amen. I saw water flowing out of the Temple, from its right side, Alleluia: And all to whom this water came were saved, And they shall say: Alleluia, Alleluia.
