= Ezekiel's Temple =

Unbuilt temple structure described in the biblical Book of Ezekiel

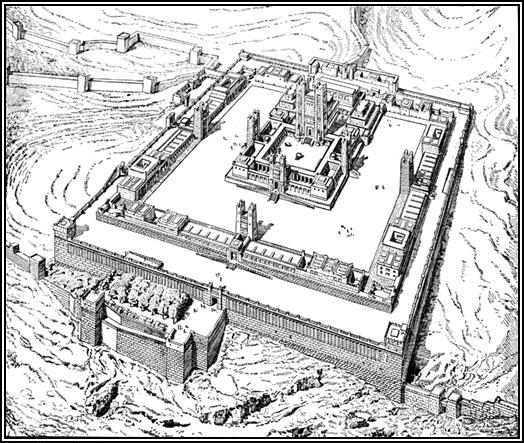
Ezekiel's Temple as imagined by Charles Chipiez in the 19th Century

Ezekiel's Temple is an unbuilt temple structure described in the biblical Book of Ezekiel.

== Details ==
Temple floor sketch based on Rabbi Meir Leibush ben Yehiel Michal's commentary to the Hebrew text of Ezekiel

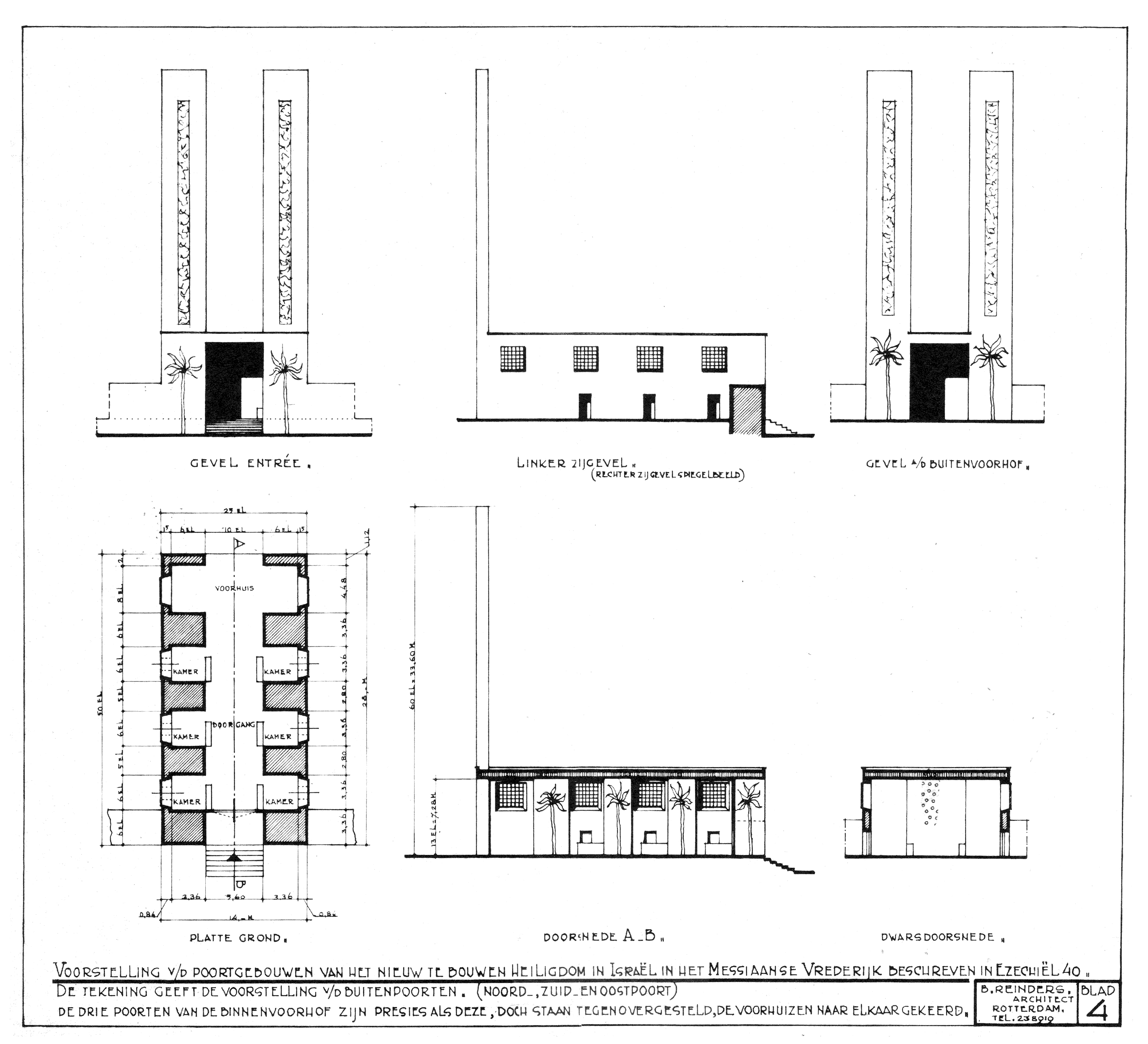
Gateways of Ezekiel's Temple, as described in the Book of Ezekiel, drawn by the Dutch architect Bartelmeüs Reinders (1893–1979)

Features of the temple are described in detail in the Book of Ezekiel, in the form of a vision given to the prophet. Physical characteristics of the multi-level wood-panelled structure such as gateways, outer and inner courts, side chambers and vestibules, archways, doors, windows, sanctuary and altar are described. Some furnishings are described. Details of decoration are given, for example cherubim and palm trees carved on the doors and walls. The purposes of the side chambers are given, for example, for robing of the priests, for consumption of the flesh of sacrifices by the priests, and for singers. Dimensions are given based on the cubit.

== Babylonian influence ==
Professor Tova Ganzel suggests that the author modelled the design based on Mesopotamian temples, such as the Ezida of Borsippa, during the Babylonian exile. This distinguishes the visionary building from the pre-exilic Tabernacle and Temple of Solomon. The context of Ezekiel's temple differs in theology and function from those of Babylon, while its architectural framework and temple layout reflects familiarity with the Neo-Babylonian urban complexes. Construction and technical terms in the text may also be influenced by Akkadian, while the name of the city is YHWH Shammah, mirroring the toponymic convention of Nippur.

== Commentary ==
The fact that details of the temple are given in the context of a prophetic vision, gives rise to analysis and debate regarding the meaning, significance and purpose of the temple.

=== Jewish commentary ===
Maimonides called it "the temple that will be built" and qualified these chapters of Ezekiel as complex for the common reader and even for the seasoned scholar. Bible commentators who have ventured into explaining the design detail directly from the Hebrew Bible text include Rashi, David Kimhi, Yom-Tov Lipmann Heller, and Meir Leibush ben Yehiel Michal, who all produced slightly varying sketches of the temple envisioned by Ezekiel.

=== Christian commentary ===
Some Christian interpretations of Ezekiel's temple are: it is the temple that Zerubbabel should have built; a literal temple to be rebuilt during the millennial reign of Christ; a temple which is symbolic of the worship of God by the Christian church today; or a symbol of the future and eternal reign of God. A number of Christian commentators also believe that this temple will be a literal fourth temple, which will exist during the Millennial Kingdom, following the destruction of a future temple that will be desecrated by the Antichrist. Author Paul Backholer envisions this premise in a 3D presentation of Ezekiel's Temple.

Other theorists instead see Ezekiel's Temple as the New Jerusalem described in the Book of Revelation; the bride of the Lamb (whose form and composite materials are similar to the Sanctuary); the Temple of God being the Christians themselves, where his Spirit will dwell in them (1 Corinthians 3:16).

== See also ==
- Babylonian architecture
- Ezekiel 40
- Third Temple
- Vidi Aquam, a Latin chant that describes the Temple in this vision
