= Asperges =

Christian rite of Baptismal memory

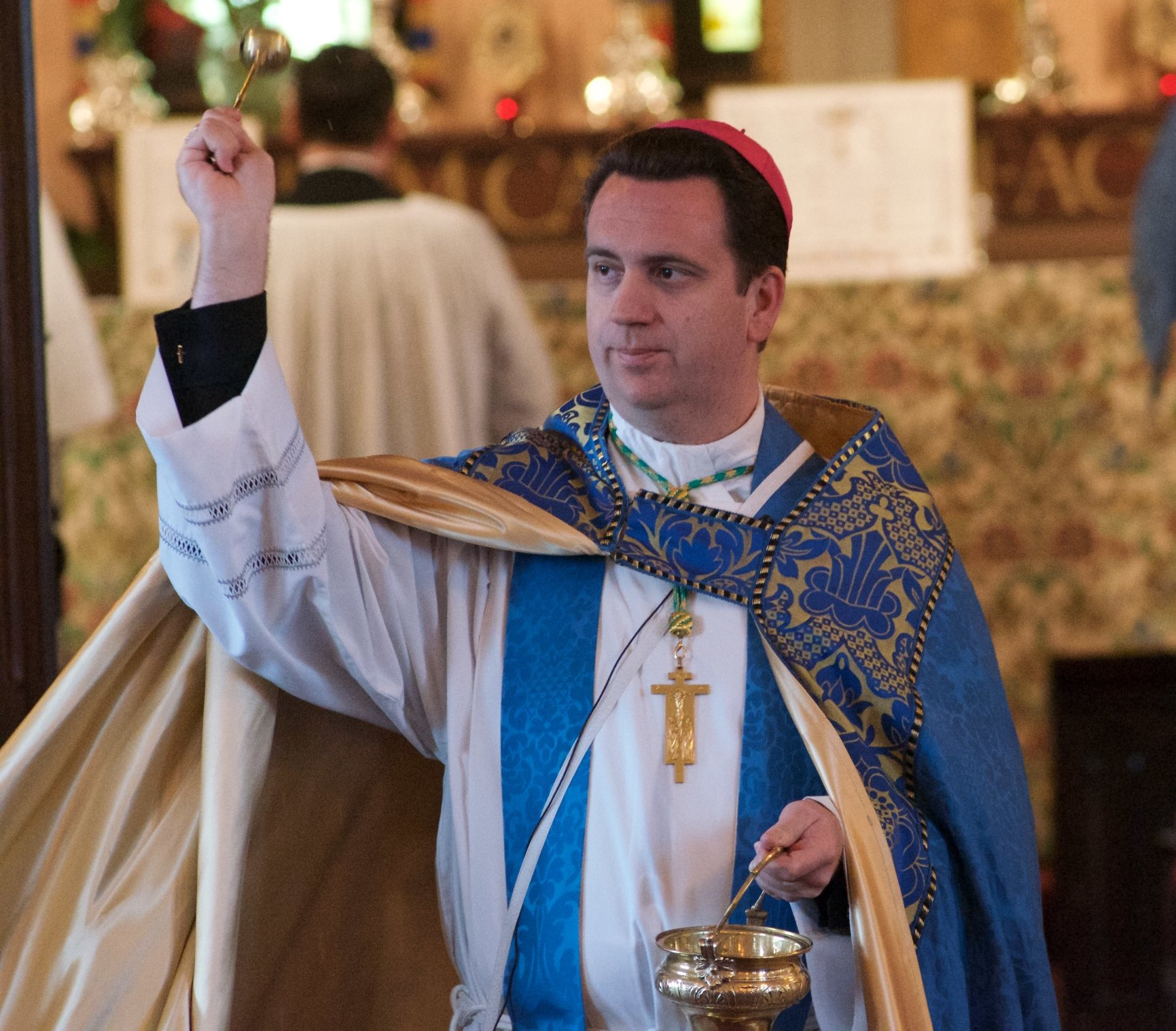
Bishop Steven J. Lopes sprinkling the congregation

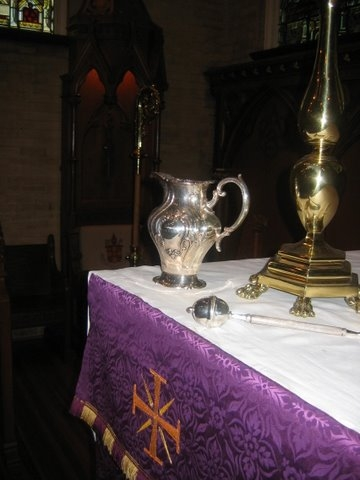
An aspergillum (sprinkler) and silver ewer of holy water on the altar, prepared for asperges (Cathedral Church of Saint Matthew, Dallas, Texas).

Asperges (/əˈspərdʒəz/ ə-SPUR-jəz) is the rite of sprinkling a congregation with holy water. The name comes from the first word in the 9th verse of Psalm 51 (Psalm 50 in the Vulgate and Septuagint) in the Latin translation which is sung during the traditional form of the rite (or optionally in the ordinary rite) except during Eastertide. The 51st Psalm is also one of the antiphons that may be sung in the rite under the Mass of Paul VI.

In the Roman Catholic and Evangelical-Lutheran traditions of Christianity, the Easter Asperges is done with Easter water as part of the renewal of Christian baptismal vows during the Easter Vigil Mass and Easter Sunday Mass. The Vidi Aquam antiphon is used instead of the usual Asperges me. The Easter Asperges is performed throughout Eastertide, from Easter Sunday through Pentecost, in order for the faithful to recall their baptism.

Apart from the Easter Asperges of the Easter Vigil and Easter Sunday, the Asperges can be done prior to the celebration of Sunday Mass throughout the liturgical year.

== Roman Rite of the Mass ==
=== Tridentine Mass ===
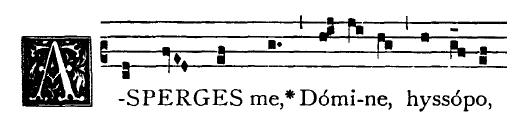
Incipit of the standard Gregorian chant setting of the Asperges, from the Liber Usualis.

Where the 1962 Latin Missal is used, the Asperges is done before the principal Mass on Sunday, except on Palm Sunday, when it is replaced with the blessing of palms followed by a procession; it is also omitted when a Pontifical High Mass is celebrated on Sundays. The Asperges is so called from the words intoned at the beginning of the ceremony, taken from Psalm 50:3, throughout the year except at Eastertide, when Vidi aquam (based on Ezechiel 47), with Psalm 116:1, is intoned. It precedes every other ceremony that may take place before the Mass, such as the blessing of palms or of candles. It is performed by the celebrant priest wearing a cope of the liturgical color of the day. It is omitted when the Blessed Sacrament is exposed, though many rubricists think that the sprinkling of the altar only, not of the congregation, should then be omitted. After intoning the antiphon the priest recites the psalm Miserere or Confitemini, according to the season, sprinkling first the front and platform of the altar, then himself, next the ministers and choir, and lastly the congregation, usually walking through the main part of the church, though he need not go beyond the gate of the sanctuary or choir. The ceremony has been in use at least from the tenth century, growing out of the custom of early antiquity of blessing water for the faithful on Sundays. Its object is to prepare the congregation for the celebration of the Mass by moving them to sentiments of penance and reverence suggested by the words of the 50th psalm, or by impressing on them that they are about to assist at the sacrifice of our redemption as suggested in the psalm used at Easter time.

Both the Asperges and the Vidi aquam are structured like the Introit of the Tridentine Mass: 1st verse (which includes Alleluias in Eastertide), 2nd verse (always from the Psalms), Gloria Patri (omitted in Passiontide), and then the 1st verse again.

=== Mass of Paul VI ===
"On Sundays, especially in Eastertide, the blessing of holy water and sprinkling with it may be carried out in memory of baptism. ... If the rite is performed within Mass it takes the place of the usual penitential act at the beginning of the Mass."

During the Easter Vigil, Christmas, and the Feast of the Baptism of the Lord, many Catholic parish Masses reserve a part of the Mass during which the Confiteor or tropes may be said (at the start of the Mass) to renew the Baptismal promises; this may be accompanied by the use of holy water to bless the congregation. This Renewal of Baptismal Vows, along with Asperges, is common among Lutherans and Anglicans as well. During the Funeral Mass, the casket is blessed with holy water and incense.

The priest blesses the water with one of the three prayers proposed (one of which is reserved for Eastertide). He may also bless salt and put it in the water, if local conditions or custom of the people favours doing so. Then he takes a sprinkler (called an aspergillum, while the container it is dipped into is called an aspersorium), and sprinkles the clergy and people, preferably walking through the church to do so.

While the sprinkling is being done, an antiphon or a hymn is sung. The Roman Missal proposes several, based on the following verses of Scripture:

- Outside of Eastertide
  - Psalm 51:9
  - Ezekiel 36:25–26
  - 1 Peter 1:3–5
- During Eastertide
  - Ezekiel 47:1–2 and Ezekiel 47:9
  - Zephaniah 3:8 and Ezekiel 36:25
  - Daniel
  - 1 Peter

But other suitable hymns are permitted.

Often, the antiphon Asperges Me is sung, except during the Easter season and on Palm Sunday, when it is replaced by the more lengthy and florid antiphon, Vidi aquam.

== Eastern Orthodox ==
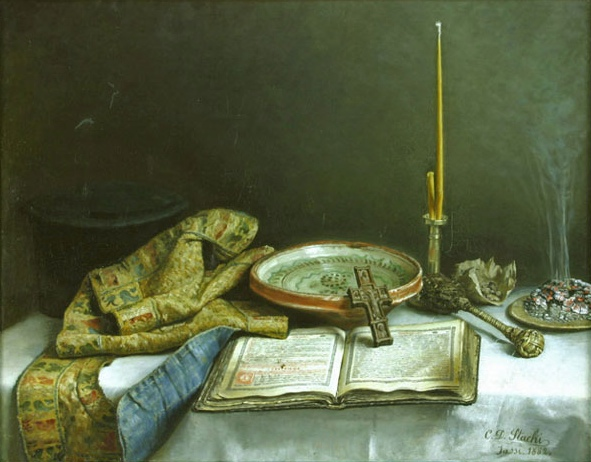
Holy Water, painting by Constantin Daniel Stahi (1882) showing the implements used in the blessing of holy water. From left to right: A priest's kamilavka and epitrachelion (stole), Euchologion, bowl of water, blessing cross, candle, aspergillum made of basil branches, incense (Muzeul Naţional de Artă, Bucharest).

In the Eastern Orthodox Church and those Eastern Catholic Churches which follow the Byzantine Rite, the sprinkling of holy water takes place on numerous occasions. The most important is on the Great Feast of Theophany (Epiphany) following the Great Blessing of Waters at the end of the Divine Liturgy. The Great Blessing takes place twice: once on the Eve of the feast, and once on the day of the feast. At both blessings, the priest sprinkles the entire temple (church building) and the faithful. He then begins the process of going to each family's home to sprinkle it with the blessed "Theophany water".

Some monasteries and churches have the tradition of blessing holy water and sprinkling on the first day of each month. There are also several feast days during the year when sprinkling with holy water is prescribed, such as Bright Friday (Friday in Easter Week), the Feast of the Procession of the Cross on the first day of the Dormition Fast, and the Feast of Mid-Pentecost (25 days after Easter), when the fields are blessed with holy water. Certain ceremonies will also call for the blessing of holy water, such as the consecration of a church.

The form of aspergillum (holy water sprinkler) may differ from place to place. The Greek Orthodox will use a randistirion which is a standing vessel with a tapered lid. The tip of the lid is pierced with small holes, from which the holy water is sprinkled. The Russian Orthodox will use a whisk made of cotton, straw or hair from which the holy water is flung.

The blessing takes place at a holy water font or baptismal font which has been placed in the center of the temple. There are two types of blessings: the Great Blessing of Waters (used on Theophany) and the Lesser Blessing of Waters (used at other times). After blessing the holy water, the priest will bless himself and drink some of the holy water. He then stands next to the holy water font holding a blessing cross in his left hand and the aspergillum in his right. Each of the clergy and faithful come forward, drink a little of the newly blessed holy water and then kiss the cross in the priest's hand as he sprinkles them on the head with holy water. During this process, the choir will chant hymns, which differ depending upon the type of blessing being celebrated. He will also sprinkle the sanctuary and the entire church.

== Lutheranism ==
In Lutheranism, asperges occurs as a part of the Divine Service on Easter Sunday as a remembrance of baptism. The formula used is nearly identical to that of the Roman Catholic Church.
