= Easter water =

Holy water used for baptisms and the remembrance of the baptism

Blessing of baptismal water at the Easter Vigil 2024 at Ibaan, Batangas

Easter Water, also called baptismal water, is the name given to holy water used in a rite during the Easter Vigil in the Catholic Church, Lutheran Churches, and the Anglican Communion. A part of this water is set aside for use as a sacramental in the church and at home, the remainder being used for baptisms in the church. In the liturgy of the Catholic Church, baptismal water is also distributed during the Asperges in the Holy Mass on Sundays from Easter to Pentecost, while the congregation sings the antiphon Vidi aquam.

== Use in liturgy ==
=== Catholic ===
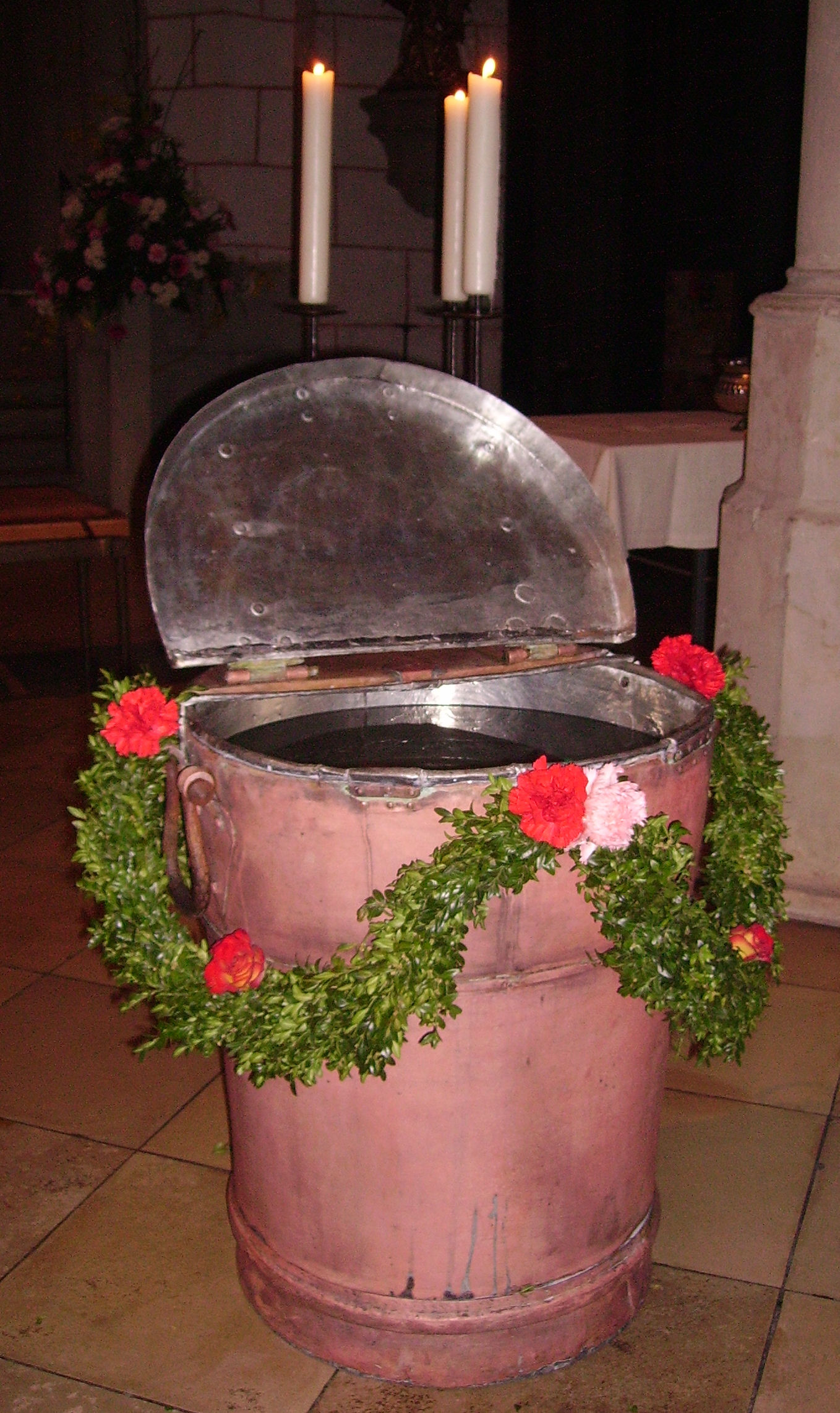
A vessel with baptismal water, decorated with flowers, in Augsburg Cathedral

Easter Water is blessed in a special rite as a part of the Easter Vigil. The rite may involve lowering the Easter candle into the water three times, representing the death and resurrection of Jesus Christ. The water symbolizes life and death, as well as repentance of sin and rebirth into a new life. It also recalls the Jordan River, to which people journeyed to hear John the Baptist's preaching, and in which Jesus himself was baptized and began his ministry. Finally, Christs says of himself that he is "living water".

The blessing begins with the priest invoking God's wondrous works through water throughout salvation history. It further references Christ's baptism and the flow of water and blood from his side on the Cross. Following the invocations of the Litany of the Saints, the Easter candle is immersed in the water three times, while the priest sings the prayer of consecration with the request for the descent of the Holy Spirit:

May the power of the Holy Spirit, O Lord, we pray, come down through your Son into the fullness of this font, so that all who have been buried with Christ by baptism into death may rise again to live with him.

The candle is lifted out of the water, and the faithful acclaim: "Springs of water, bless the Lord; praise and exalt him above all for ever".

=== Lutheran ===
The blessing of the Easter water according to The Lutheran Missal, takes place according to the following form:

The priest, other sacred ministers, and baptismal candidates proceed to the font as a litany is sung, bringing the paschal candle with them. After a brief prayer, the priest proceeds into a sung preface equal to or slightly lengthier than the Exultet. During the singing of this preface, the water is divided repeatedly in the shape of a cross, the priest blows on the water in an exsufflation similar to that at baptism, and he takes water in his hand and sprinkles it in four directions, representing the rivers of Paradise. Finally, the base of the blessed paschal candle, lit with the new fire, is dipped into the font, and the priest again blows on the water, this time in the shape of the Greek letter Ψ (psi) or the Hebrew letter ש (shin/sin), depending on the source in question. This dipping of the paschal candle and the subsequent exsufflation are done three times in total. Once this preface has come to its conclusion, the priest takes one spatula in each hand, one dipped in chrism, the other in the oil of catechumens, using them to make the sign of the cross in the water three times. Following this, any baptismal candidates are baptized, and a brief litany might be sung, or the completion of the litany begun before the blessing of the font, or the Kyrie in the paschal tone is simply intoned.

In the Catholic, Lutheran and Anglican traditions, the Easter Water is then used for baptisms in and after the Easter Vigil.

== Blessing and use in Christian homes ==
Easter water may be taken home to bless the house. At home, the families may pray:

"Whatever it sprinkles in the homes of the faithful, may it be cleansed and delivered from harm. Let such homes enjoy a spirit of goodness and an atmosphere of tranquility, freed from harmful or hidden snares. By the sprinkling of this water, may everything opposed to the safety of them that dwell there be banished, so that they may possess the well-being they seek in calling upon Thy holy Name, protected from every evil."

== Customs ==
Washing in Easter Water was believed to afford long-lasting freshness of the skin and to give women who bathed in a stream or river on the eve of Easter, "beauty and seduction, provided it had done so in silence and in secret." It is also said that men plunged into a river on Easter morning to "gain strength and health throughout the year."
