= Blessed salt =

Salt used in Christian worship

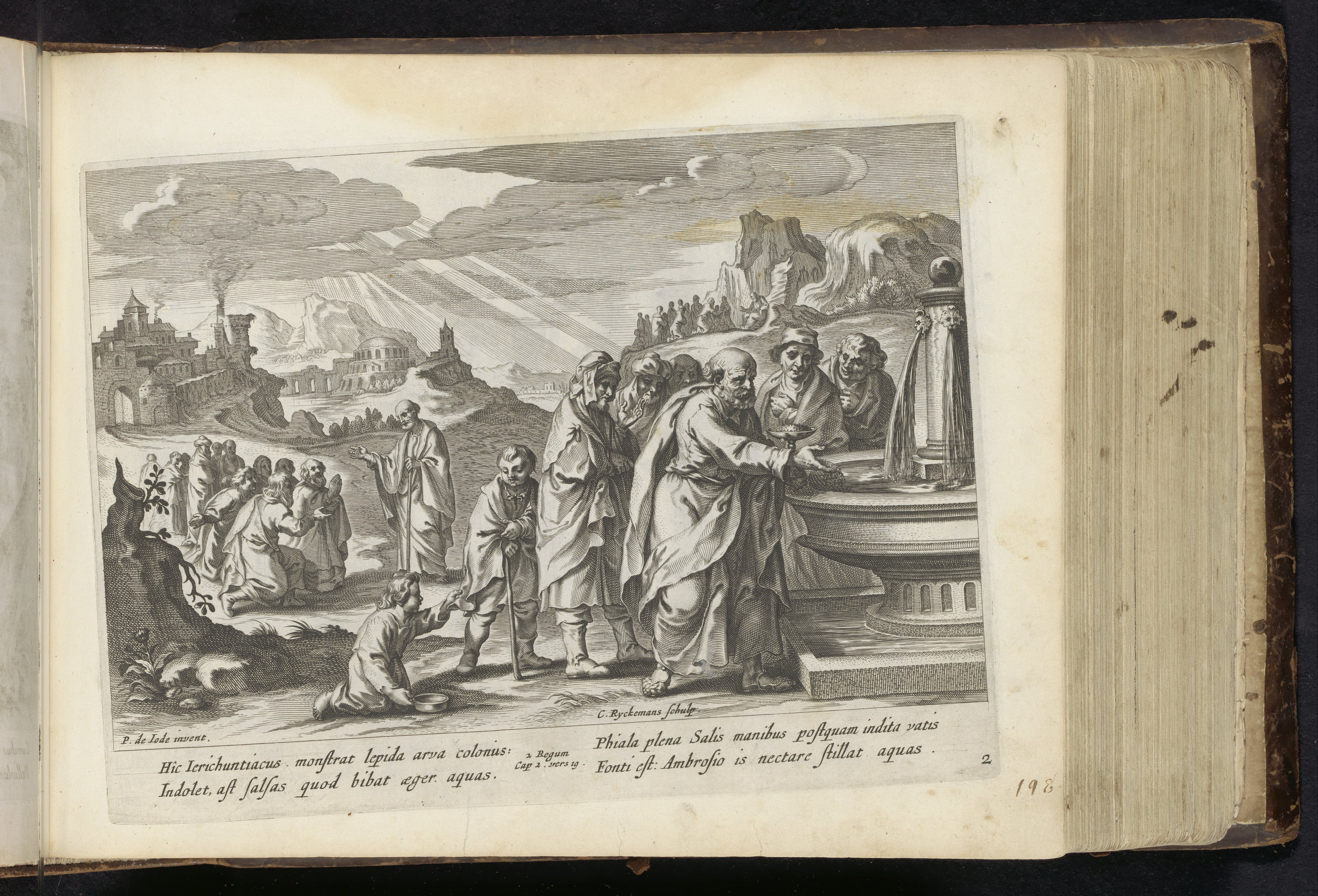
Eliseus pouring salt on the waters of Jericho.

Blessed salt has been used in various forms throughout the history of Christianity. Among early Christians, the savoring of blessed salt often took place along with baptism. In the fourth century, Augustine of Hippo named these practices "visible forms of invisible grace". However, its modern use as a sacramental remains mostly limited to its use with holy water within the Anglican Communion and Roman Catholic Church.

== History ==
2 Kings 2, (2 Kings 2:19–22) narrates how prophet Eliseus poured salt onto Jericho’s springs to cure the poisoned waters.

For centuries since Jesus, salt cleansed and sanctified by special exorcisms and prayers, was given to catechumens before entering a church for baptism. According to the fifth canon of the Third Council of Carthage in the third century, salt was administered to catechumens several times a year, a process attested to by Augustine of Hippo (Confessions I.11). Two specific procedures, namely a cross traced on the forehead and a taste of blessed salt, not only marked the entrance into the catechumenate, but were repeated regularly. By his own account, Augustine was “blessed regularly with the Sign of the Cross and was seasoned with God's salt.”

Early in the sixth century, John the Deacon explained the use of blessed salt, “so the mind which is drenched and weakened by the waves of this world is held steady”. Salt continued to be customarily used during the scrutinies of catechumens or the baptism of infants.

The earliest extant prayers for blessing salt and water date from Merovingian France, sometime between 600 and 751.

== Current use ==
In recent times, the use of blessed salt is found within some Catholic and Anglican liturgies of Holy Baptism, and in the blessing of holy water, sometimes called lustral water.

The Traditional Formula for the Blessing of Salt and Holy Water as found in the Roman Ritual is as follows:

Blessing in Latin
Diebus Dominicis, et quandocumque opus sit, præparato sale et aqua munda benedicenda in ecclesia, vel in sacristia, Sacerdos, superpelliceo et stola violacea indutus, primo dicit:

V. Adjutorium nostrum in nomine Domini.
R. Qui fecit cælum et terram.

Deinde absolute incipit exorcismum salis:

Exorcizo te, creatura salis, per Deum ✠ vivum, per Deum ✠ verum, per Deum ✠ sanctum, per Deum, qui te per Eliseum Prophetam in aquam mitti jussit, ut sanaretur sterilitas aque: ut efficiaris sal exorcizatum in salutem credentium; et sis omnibus sumentibus te sanitas animæ et corporis; et effigiat, atque discedat a loco, in quo aspersum fueris, omnis phantasia, et nequitia, vel versutia diabolicæ fraudis, omnisque spiritus immundus, adjuratus per eum, qui venturus est judicare vivos et mortuos, et sæculum per ignem.
R. Amen.

Oremus.
Immensam clementiam tuam, omnipoten æterne Deus, humiliter imploramus, ut hanc creaturam salis, quam in usum generis humani tribuisti, bene ✠ dicere et sancti ✠ ficare tua pietate digneris: ut sit omnibus sumentibus salus mentis et corporis; et quidquid ex eo tactum vel respersum fuerit, careat omni immunditia, omnique impugnatione spiritalis nequitiæ. Per Dominum.
R. Amen.

Exorcismus aquae: et dicitur absolute:

Exorcizo te, creatura aquæ, in nomine Dei ✠ Patris omnipotentis, et in nomine Jesu ✠ Christi Filii ejus Domini nostri, et in virtute Spiritus ✠ Sancti: ut fias aqua exorcizata ad effugandam omnem potestatem inimici, et ipsum inimicum eradicare et explantare valeas cum angelis suis apostaticis, per virtutem ajusdem Domini nostri Jesu Christi: qui venturus est judicare vivos et mortuos, et sæculum per ignem.
R. Amen

Oremus.
Deus, qui ad salutem humani generis, maxima quæque sacramenta in aquarum substantia condidisti: adesto propitius invocationibus nostris, et elemento huic multìmodis purificationibus præparato, virtutem tuæ bene ✠ dictionis infunde: ut creatura tua, mysteriis tuis serviens, ad abigendos dæmones, morbosque pellendos, divinæ gratiæ sumat effectum; ut quidquid in domibus, vel in locis fidelium, hæc unda resperserit, careat omni immunditia, liberetur a noxa: non illic resideat spiritus pestilens, non aura corrumpens: discedant omnes insidiæ latentis inimici; et si quid est, quod aut incolumitati habitantium invidet, aut quieti, aspersione hujus aquæ effugiat: ut salubritas, per invocationem sancti tui nominis expetita, ab omnibus sit impugnationibus defensa. Per Dominum nostrum Jesum Christum Filium tuum: Qui tecum vivit et regnat in unitate Spiritus Sancti Deus per omnia sæcula sæculorum.
R. Amen.

Eic ter mittat sal in aquam in modum crucis, dicendo semel:

Commixtio salis et aquæ pariter fiat, in nomine Pa ✠ tris, et Fi ✠ lii, et Spiritus ✠ Sancti. R. Amen.

V. Dominus vobiscum.
R. Et cum spiritu tuo.

Oremus.
Deus, invictæ virtutis auctor, et insuperabilis imperii Rex, ac semper magnificus triumphator: qui adversæ dominationis vires reprimis: qui inimici rugientis sævitiam superas: qui hostiles nequitias potenter expugnas: te, Domine, trementes et supplices deprecamur, ac petimus: ut hanc creaturam salis et aquæ dignanter aspicias, benignus illustres, pietatis tuæ rore sanctifices; ut, ubicumque fuerit aspersa, per invocationem sancti nominis tui, omnis infestatio immundi spiritus abigatur: terrorque venenosi serpentis procul pellatur: et præsentia Santi Spiritus nobis, misericordiam tuam poscentibus, ubique adesse dignetur. Per Dominum nostrum Jesum Christum Filium tuum: Qui tecum vivit et regnat in unitate ejusdem Spiritus Sancti Deus per omnia sæcula sæculorum.
R. Amen.

Post benedictionem aquæ, Sacerdos Dominicis diebus, antequam incipiat Missam, aspergit Altare, deinde se, et Ministros, ac populum, prout in Missali præscribitur, et Asperges suo loco habetur.

Christifideles autem possunt de ista aqua benedicta in vasculis accipere, et secum deferre ad aspergendos ægros, domos, agros, vineas, et alia, et ad habendam in habitaculis suis, ut ea quotidie et sæpius aspergi possint.

Blessing in English
On Sundays, or whenever this blessing takes place, salt and fresh water are prepared in the church or in the sacristy. The priest, vested in surplice and purple stole, says:

V. Our help is in the name of the Lord.
R. Who made heaven and earth.

Exorcism and Blessing of salt:

Thou creature of salt, I purge thee of evil by the living ✠ God, by the true ✠ God, by the holy ✠ God, by the God Who ordered thee through Eliseus,* the prophet to be cast into the water to cure its unfruitfulness. Be thou a purified salt for the health of believers, giving soundness of body and soul to all who use thee. In whatever place thou art sprinkled, may phantams and wicked- ness, and Satan's cunning be banished. And let every unclean spirit be repulsed by Him Who shall come to judge the living and dead, and the world by fire.
R. Amen.

Let us pray.
O Almighty, everlasting God! Humbly we implore thy boundless mercy that thou wouldst deign of thy goodness to bless ✠ and sanctify ✠ this creature of salt which thou hast given for the use of mankind. May all that use it find in it a remedy for soul and body. And let everything which it touches or sprinkles be freed from uncleanness and assault from evil spirits. Through our Lord.
R. Amen.

Exorcism and Blessing of the water:

Thou creature of water, I purge thee of evil in the name of God ✠ the Father almighty, in the name of Jesus ✠ Christ, His Son, our Lord, and in the power of the Holy ✠ Spirit, that thou mayest be water fit to brace us against the envious foe. Mayest thou be empowered to drive him forth and exile him together with his fallen angels by the power of the selfsame Jesus Christ, our Lord Who shall come to judge the living and the dead, and the world by fire.
R. Amen

Let us pray.
O God, Who for man's salvation dost dispense wondrous mysteries with the efficacious sign of water, hearken to our prayer - pouring forth thy benediction ✠ upon this element which we consecrate with manifold purifications. Let this creature serve thee in expelling demons and curing diseases. Whatsoever it sprinkles in the homes of the faithful, be it cleansed and delivered from harm. Let such homes enjoy a spirit of goodness and an air of tranquility, freed from baneful and hidden snares. By the sprinkling of this water may everything opposed to the safety and repose of them that dwell therein be banished, so that they may possess the well-being they seek in calling upon thy holy name, and be protected from all peril. Through our Lord.
R. Amen.

Now the salt is thrice put into the water in the form of a cross, saying only once:

May this salt and water be mixed together, in the name of the Father ✠ and of the Son ✠ and of the Holy ✠ Spirit. R. Amen.

V. The Lord be with you.
R. And with thy spirit.

Let us pray.
Author of invincible strength and king of an unconquerable empire, ever the gloriously Triumphant One! Who restrainest the force of the adversary, Who overcomest the fierce- ness of the devouring enemy, Who valiantly putteth down hostile influences! Prostrate and fearsome we beseech thee, Lord, con- sider kindly this creature of salt and water, make it honored, and sanctify it with the dew of thy sweetness. Wherever it is sprinkled in thy name, may devilish infection cease, venomous terror be driven afar. But let the presence of the Holy Spirit be ever with us as we implore thy mercy. Through our Lord, Jesus Christ, thy Son, Who liveth and reigneth with thee in unity of the same Holy Spirit, God, eternally.
R. Amen.

On Sundays after the water is blessed and before Mass begins the celebrant sprinkles the altar, himself, the ministers, and the people as prescribed in the Missal and in the ceremony of the Ritual.

Christ's faithful are permitted to take holy water home with them to sprinkle the sick, their homes, fields, vineyards, and the like. It is recommended too that they put it in fonts in the various rooms, so that they may use it to bless themselves daily and frequently.

The Anglican Missal, used by some Anglo-Catholics, in The Order of Blessing Water, includes an English translation of traditional prayers for the exorcism and blessing of salt. The Collect reads:

Almighty and everlasting God, we humbly beseech thy infinite goodness, that thou wouldest vouchsafe of thy mercy to ble+ss and sanct+ify this thy creature of salt, which thou hast bestowed for the necessities of mankind: let it be profitable for all them that receive it for their healing both in body and soul: and grant that all such things as are touched or sprinkled with the same may be delivered from all uncleanliness, and defended against the assaults of all spiritual wickedness. Through Jesus Christ our Lord. Amen.

In the section on Occasional Offices of the Book of Common Prayer, the following prayer, given under the rite for Blessing of Holy Water is said before the holy water is blessed and “salt is put into the water in the form of a cross”:

“Almighty and everlasting God, you have created salt for the use of man, we ask you to bless this salt and grant that wherever it is sprinkled and whatever is touched by it may be set free from all impurity and the attacks of Satan; through Jesus Christ our Lord. Amen.”

The Roman Rite of the Catholic Church also mentions use of blessed salt. The 1962 Rituale Romanum includes salt as component in three rites:

- Baptism: Before the candidates enter the church or baptistry, salt is blessed with an exorcism, and a pinch can be put in the mouth of the candidates. However, in modern practice this can be skipped.
- Reconsecration of an altar: In one rite for the reconsecration of an altar which has been disturbed, salt is exorcized, blessed, and mixed with ashes, water and wine. The resulting paste is used to make the mortar with which the altar is resealed.
- Blessing holy water: Salt is added to water in silence after a prayer in which God is asked to bless the salt, recalling the blessed salt “scattered over the water by the prophet Elisha” and invoking the protective powers of salt and water, that they may “drive away the power of evil”.

An additional rite provides for the blessing of salt for animals.

Blessed salt is also used in prayer services of Pentecostal churches, such as the Apostolic Church Fullness of God's Throne in Brazil.

=== Salt as sacramental ===
Salt may also be blessed for use as a sacramental, using the exact same prayer for it when preparing holy water. This salt may be sprinkled in a room, across a threshold, or in other places as an invocation of divine protection. This is believed to keep demons and possessed persons away and from crossing a line made of salt. It may also be consumed.
