= Prayer shawl =

Prayer shawl may refer to:

- Tallit, in Judaism
- A prayer cloth in Christianity, used as a sacramental among adherents of various denominations.
- A mantilla in Christianity, used by women of the Catholic, Lutheran and Plymouth Brethren denominations
