= Holy water in Christianity =

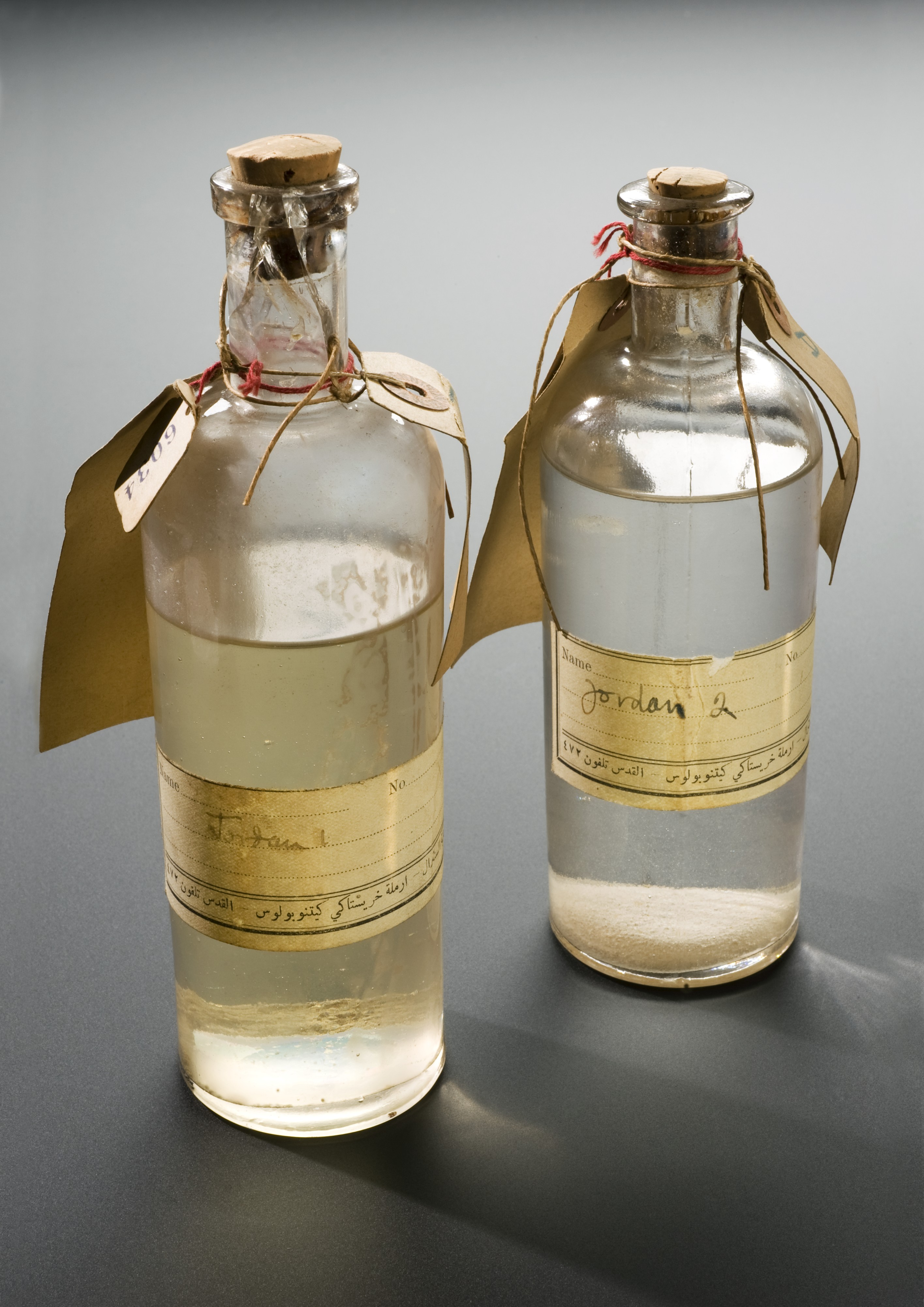
Bottles of water collected in 1930 from the River Jordan, at the site where Jesus Christ was believed to have been baptized by John the Baptist

In several Christian denominations, such as Catholicism, Lutheranism, Anglicanism, Eastern Orthodoxy, Oriental Orthodoxy; holy water is water that has been sanctified by a priest for the purpose of baptism, for the blessing of persons, places, and objects, or as a means of repelling evil.

== History ==
The Apostolic Constitutions, whose texts date to c. 400 AD, attribute the precept of using holy water to the Apostle Matthew. It is plausible that the earliest Christians may have used water for expiatory and purificatory purposes in a way analogous to its employment in Jewish Law ("And he shall take holy water in an earthen vessel, and he shall cast a little earth of the pavement of the tabernacle into it", Numbers 5:17). Yet in many cases, the water used for the sacrament of Baptism was flowing water, sea- or river-water, which—in the view of the Roman Catholic Church—could not receive the same blessing as that water contained in the baptisteries. However, Eastern Orthodox and Byzantine Catholic Christians perform the same blessing, whether in a baptistery or at an outdoor body of water.

== Use and storage ==
Sprinkling with holy water is used as a sacramental that recalls baptism. In the West, the blessing of the water is traditionally accompanied by exorcism and by the addition of exorcised and blessed salt.

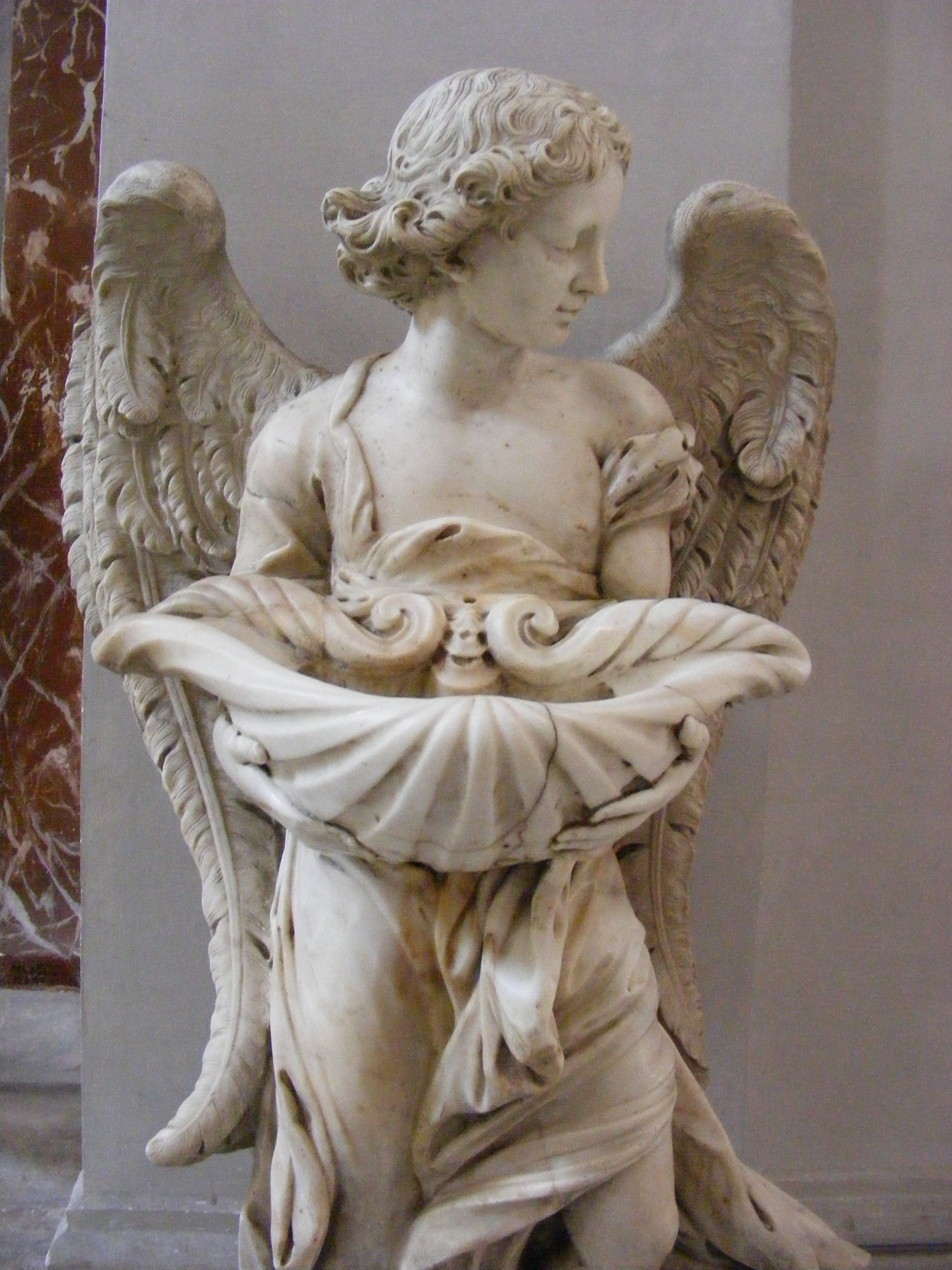
A holy water container (stoup) at the church of Santa Maria degli Angeli, Rome

Holy water is kept in the holy water font, which is typically located at the entrance to the church (or sometimes in a separate room or building called a baptistery). Smaller vessels, called stoups, are usually placed at the entrances of the church, to enable people to bless themselves with it on entering.

In the Middle Ages, Christians esteemed the power of holy water so highly that in some places fonts had locked covers to prevent the theft of holy water for unauthorized magic practices. The Constitutions of Archbishop Edmund Rich (1236) prescribe that: "Fonts are to be kept under lock and key, because of witchcraft (sortilege). Similarly the chrism and sacred oil are kept locked up."

In Catholicism, holy water, as well as the water used during the washing of the priest's hands at Mass, is not allowed to be disposed of in regular plumbing. Roman Catholic churches will usually have a special basin (a sacrarium) that leads directly into the ground for the purpose of proper disposal. A hinged lid is kept over the holy water basin to distinguish it from a regular sink basin, which is often just beside it. Items that contained holy water are separated, drained of the holy water, and then washed in a regular manner in the adjacent sink.

== Hygiene ==
Holy water fonts have been identified as a potential source of bacterial and viral infection. In the late 19th century, bacteriologists found staphylococci, streptococci, coli bacilli, Loeffler's bacillus, and other bacteria in samples of holy water taken from a church in Sassari, Italy. In a study performed in 1995, 13 samples were taken when a burn patient acquired a bacterial infection after exposure to holy water. The samples in that study were shown to have a "wide range of bacterial species", some of which could cause infection in humans. During the swine-flu epidemic of 2009, Bishop John Steinbock of Fresno, California, recommended that "holy water should not be in the fonts" for fear of spreading infections. Also in response to the swine flu, an automatic, motion-detecting holy-water dispenser was invented and installed in Milan Cathedral in 2009. In 2020, because of the COVID-19 pandemic, Episcopal Conferences directed that holy water be removed from the fonts or stoups.

== In Catholicism ==
=== Sacramental and sanctification ===
A blessing, as a prayer, is a sacramental. By blessing water, Catholic priests praise God and ask for his grace. As a reminder of baptism, Catholic Christians dip their fingers in holy water and make the sign of the cross when entering a church.

Fr. John F. Sullivan, writing in the early twentieth century, noted that, "Besides the pouring of baptismal water ... the sprinkling with holy water is a part of the ceremonies of Matrimony, of Extreme Unction and of the administration of the Holy Eucharist to the sick, and it is employed also in services for the dead."

The Sunday liturgy may begin with the Rite of Blessing and Sprinkling Holy Water, in which holy water is sprinkled upon the congregation; this is called "aspersion" (from the Latin, aspergere, "to sprinkle"). This ceremony dates back to the 9th century. An "aspergill" or aspergillum is a brush or branch used to sprinkle the water. An aspersorium is the vessel which holds the holy water and into which the aspergillum is dipped, though elaborate Ottonian examples are known as situlae. Blessed salt may be added to the water where it is customary to do so.

The Catholic Church teaches that this use of holy water and making a sign of the cross when entering a church reflects a renewal of baptism, a cleansing of venial sin, as well as providing protection against evil. It is sometimes accompanied by the following prayer:

By this holy water and by your Precious Blood, wash away all my sins, O Lord.

Some Catholics believe that water from specific shrines (such as Lourdes) can bring healing—although that water is not the same as typical holy water found in parishes, since it has not been blessed by a priest.

=== Formula ===
The Traditional Formula for the Blessing of Salt and Holy Water as found in the Roman Ritual is as follows:

Blessing in Latin
Diebus Dominicis, et quandocumque opus sit, præparato sale et aqua munda benedicenda in ecclesia, vel in sacristia, Sacerdos, superpelliceo et stola violacea indutus, primo dicit:

V. Adjutorium nostrum in nomine Domini.
R. Qui fecit cælum et terram.

Deinde absolute incipit exorcismum salis:

Exorcizo te, creatura salis, per Deum ✠ vivum, per Deum ✠ verum, per Deum ✠ sanctum, per Deum, qui te per Eliseum Prophetam in aquam mitti jussit, ut sanaretur sterilitas aque: ut efficiaris sal exorcizatum in salutem credentium; et sis omnibus sumentibus te sanitas animæ et corporis; et effigiat, atque discedat a loco, in quo aspersum fueris, omnis phantasia, et nequitia, vel versutia diabolicæ fraudis, omnisque spiritus immundus, adjuratus per eum, qui venturus est judicare vivos et mortuos, et sæculum per ignem.
R. Amen.

Oremus.
Immensam clementiam tuam, omnipoten æterne Deus, humiliter imploramus, ut hanc creaturam salis, quam in usum generis humani tribuisti, bene ✠ dicere et sancti ✠ ficare tua pietate digneris: ut sit omnibus sumentibus salus mentis et corporis; et quidquid ex eo tactum vel respersum fuerit, careat omni immunditia, omnique impugnatione spiritalis nequitiæ. Per Dominum.
R. Amen.

Exorcismus aquae: et dicitur absolute:

Exorcizo te, creatura aquæ, in nomine Dei ✠ Patris omnipotentis, et in nomine Jesu ✠ Christi Filii ejus Domini nostri, et in virtute Spiritus ✠ Sancti: ut fias aqua exorcizata ad effugandam omnem potestatem inimici, et ipsum inimicum eradicare et explantare valeas cum angelis suis apostaticis, per virtutem ajusdem Domini nostri Jesu Christi: qui venturus est judicare vivos et mortuos, et sæculum per ignem.
R. Amen

Oremus.
Deus, qui ad salutem humani generis, maxima quæque sacramenta in aquarum substantia condidisti: adesto propitius invocationibus nostris, et elemento huic multìmodis purificationibus præparato, virtutem tuæ bene ✠ dictionis infunde: ut creatura tua, mysteriis tuis serviens, ad abigendos dæmones, morbosque pellendos, divinæ gratiæ sumat effectum; ut quidquid in domibus, vel in locis fidelium, hæc unda resperserit, careat omni immunditia, liberetur a noxa: non illic resideat spiritus pestilens, non aura corrumpens: discedant omnes insidiæ latentis inimici; et si quid est, quod aut incolumitati habitantium invidet, aut quieti, aspersione hujus aquæ effugiat: ut salubritas, per invocationem sancti tui nominis expetita, ab omnibus sit impugnationibus defensa. Per Dominum nostrum Jesum Christum Filium tuum: Qui tecum vivit et regnat in unitate Spiritus Sancti Deus per omnia sæcula sæculorum.
R. Amen.

Eic ter mittat sal in aquam in modum crucis, dicendo semel:

Commixtio salis et aquæ pariter fiat, in nomine Pa ✠ tris, et Fi ✠ lii, et Spiritus ✠ Sancti. R. Amen.

V. Dominus vobiscum.
R. Et cum spiritu tuo.

Oremus.
Deus, invictæ virtutis auctor, et insuperabilis imperii Rex, ac semper magnificus triumphator: qui adversæ dominationis vires reprimis: qui inimici rugientis sævitiam superas: qui hostiles nequitias potenter expugnas: te, Domine, trementes et supplices deprecamur, ac petimus: ut hanc creaturam salis et aquæ dignanter aspicias, benignus illustres, pietatis tuæ rore sanctifices; ut, ubicumque fuerit aspersa, per invocationem sancti nominis tui, omnis infestatio immundi spiritus abigatur: terrorque venenosi serpentis procul pellatur: et præsentia Santi Spiritus nobis, misericordiam tuam poscentibus, ubique adesse dignetur. Per Dominum nostrum Jesum Christum Filium tuum: Qui tecum vivit et regnat in unitate ejusdem Spiritus Sancti Deus per omnia sæcula sæculorum.
R. Amen.

Post benedictionem aquæ, Sacerdos Dominicis diebus, antequam incipiat Missam, aspergit Altare, deinde se, et Ministros, ac populum, prout in Missali præscribitur, et Asperges suo loco habetur.

Christifideles autem possunt de ista aqua benedicta in vasculis accipere, et secum deferre ad aspergendos ægros, domos, agros, vineas, et alia, et ad habendam in habitaculis suis, ut ea quotidie et sæpius aspergi possint.

Blessing in English
On Sundays, or whenever this blessing takes place, salt and fresh water are prepared in the church or in the sacristy. The priest, vested in surplice and purple stole, says:

V. Our help is in the name of the Lord.
R. Who made heaven and earth.

Exorcism and Blessing of salt:

Thou creature of salt, I purge thee of evil by the living ✠ God, by the true ✠ God, by the holy ✠ God, by the God Who ordered thee through Eliseus,* the prophet to be cast into the water to cure its unfruitfulness. Be thou a purified salt for the health of believers, giving soundness of body and soul to all who use thee. In whatever place thou art sprinkled, may phantams and wicked- ness, and Satan's cunning be banished. And let every unclean spirit be repulsed by Him Who shall come to judge the living and dead, and the world by fire.
R. Amen.

Let us pray.
O Almighty, everlasting God! Humbly we implore thy boundless mercy that thou wouldst deign of thy goodness to bless ✠ and sanctify ✠ this creature of salt which thou hast given for the use of mankind. May all that use it find in it a remedy for soul and body. And let everything which it touches or sprinkles be freed from uncleanness and assault from evil spirits. Through our Lord.
R. Amen.

Exorcism and Blessing of the water:

Thou creature of water, I purge thee of evil in the name of God ✠ the Father almighty, in the name of Jesus ✠ Christ, His Son, our Lord, and in the power of the Holy ✠ Spirit, that thou mayest be water fit to brace us against the envious foe. Mayest thou be empowered to drive him forth and exile him together with his fallen angels by the power of the selfsame Jesus Christ, our Lord Who shall come to judge the living and the dead, and the world by fire.
R. Amen

Let us pray.
O God, Who for man's salvation dost dispense wondrous mysteries with the efficacious sign of water, hearken to our prayer - pouring forth thy benediction ✠ upon this element which we consecrate with manifold purifications. Let this creature serve thee in expelling demons and curing diseases. Whatsoever it sprinkles in the homes of the faithful, be it cleansed and delivered from harm. Let such homes enjoy a spirit of goodness and an air of tranquility, freed from baneful and hidden snares. By the sprinkling of this water may everything opposed to the safety and repose of them that dwell therein be banished, so that they may possess the well-being they seek in calling upon thy holy name, and be protected from all peril. Through our Lord.
R. Amen.

Now the salt is thrice put into the water in the form of a cross, saying only once:

May this salt and water be mixed together, in the name of the Father ✠ and of the Son ✠ and of the Holy ✠ Spirit. R. Amen.

V. The Lord be with you.
R. And with thy spirit.

Let us pray.
Author of invincible strength and king of an unconquerable empire, ever the gloriously Triumphant One! Who restrainest the force of the adversary, Who overcomest the fierce- ness of the devouring enemy, Who valiantly putteth down hostile influences! Prostrate and fearsome we beseech thee, Lord, con- sider kindly this creature of salt and water, make it honored, and sanctify it with the dew of thy sweetness. Wherever it is sprinkled in thy name, may devilish infection cease, venomous terror be driven afar. But let the presence of the Holy Spirit be ever with us as we implore thy mercy. Through our Lord, Jesus Christ, thy Son, Who liveth and reigneth with thee in unity of the same Holy Spirit, God, eternally.
R. Amen.

On Sundays after the water is blessed and before Mass begins the celebrant sprinkles the altar, himself, the ministers, and the people as prescribed in the Missal and in the ceremony of the Ritual.

Christ's faithful are permitted to take holy water home with them to sprinkle the sick, their homes, fields, vineyards, and the like. It is recommended too that they put it in fonts in the various rooms, so that they may use it to bless themselves daily and frequently.

A priest may choose from three other formulae found in the Book of Blessings for blessing water. They are to be accompanied by the priest blessing the water with the sign of the cross. They are as follows:

V. Blessed are you, Lord, all-powerful God, who in Christ, the living water of salvation, blessed and transformed us. Grant that when we are sprinkled with this water or make use of it, we will be refreshed inwardly by the power of the Holy Spirit and continue to walk in the new life we received at Baptism. We ask this though Christ our Lord. R. Amen.

V. Lord, holy Father, look with kindness on your children redeemed by your Son and born to a new life by water and the Holy Spirit. Grant that those who are sprinkled with this water may be renewed in body and spirit and may make a pure offering of their service to you. We ask this through Christ our Lord. R. Amen.

V. O God, the Creator of all things, by water and the Holy Spirit you have given the universe its beauty and fashioned us in your own image. R. Bless and purify your Church. V. O Christ the Lord, from your pierced side you gave us your sacraments as fountains of salvation. R. Bless and purify your Church. V. Priest: O Holy Spirit, giver of life, from the baptismal font of the Church you have formed us into a new creation in the waters of rebirth. R. Bless and purify your Church.

=== Protection against evil ===
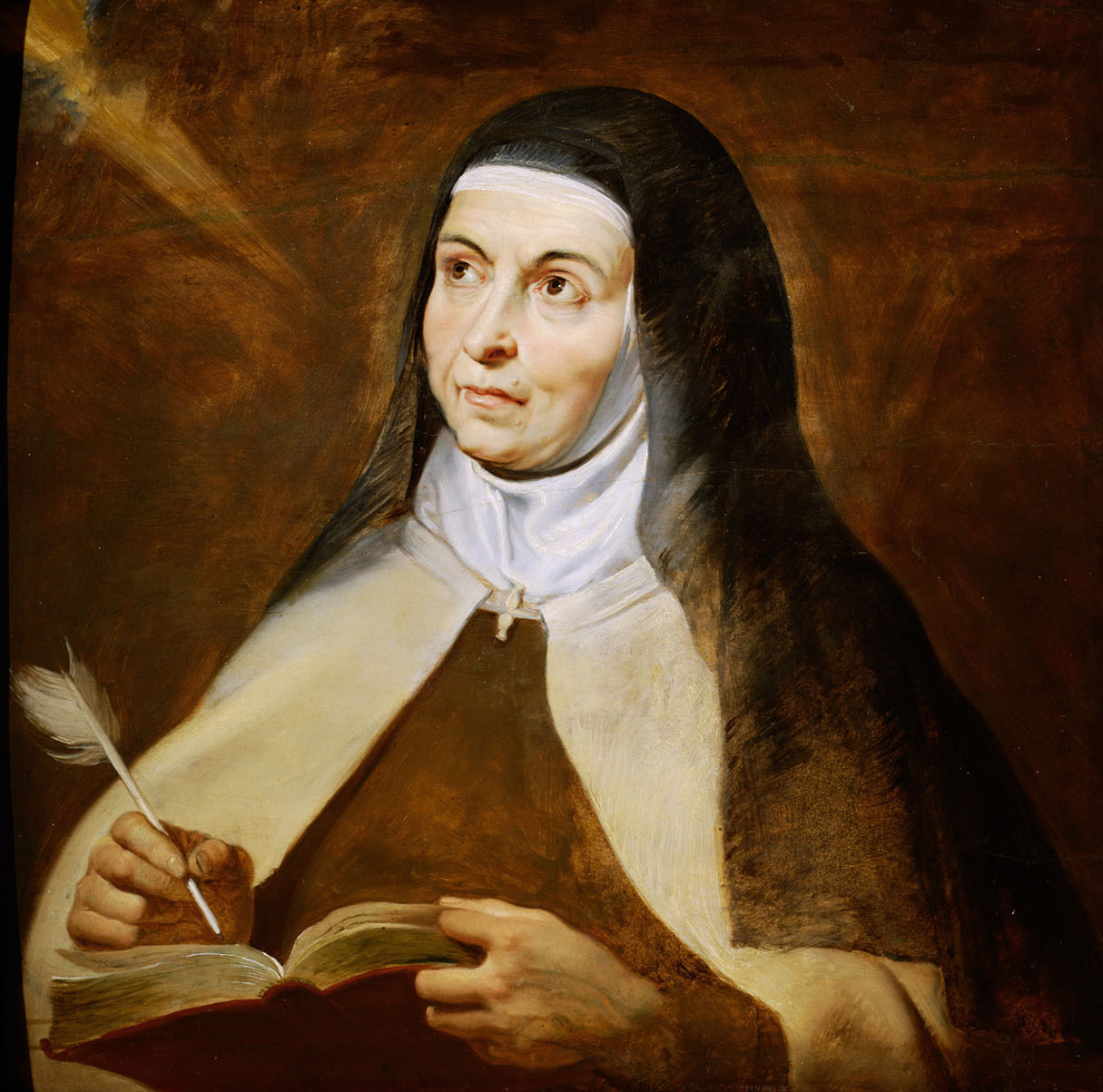
Saint Teresa of Avila, by Rubens, 1615

In his book The Externals of the Catholic Church, originally published in 1917, Fr. John F. Sullivan writes:

The prayers said over the water are addressed to the Father, the Son, and the Holy Ghost, that through the power of the Blessed Trinity the spirits of evil may be utterly expelled from this world and lose all influence over mankind. Then God is besought to bless the water, that it may be effective in driving out devils and in curing diseases; that wherever it is sprinkled there may be freedom from pestilence and from the snares of Satan.

Catholic saints have written about the power of holy water as a force that repels evil. Saint Teresa of Avila (1515–1582), a Doctor of the Church who reported visions of Jesus and Mary, believed fervently in the power of holy water and stated that she used it with success to repel evil and temptations. She wrote:

I know by frequent experience that there is nothing which puts the devils to flight like Holy water.

The 20th-century nun and mystic Saint Faustina in her diary (paragraph 601) said she once sprinkled a dying sister with holy water to drive away demons. Although this was wrong to do, since it was the priest's duty, she remarked, "holy water is indeed of great help to the dying".

In Holy Water and Its Significance for Catholics, Cistercian priest Henry Theiler states that in addition to being a strong force in repelling evil, holy water has the twofold benefit of providing grace for both body and soul.

The new Rituale Romanum excludes the exorcism prayer on the water. Exorcised and blessed salt has traditionally been added to the holy water as well. Priests can continue to use the older form if they wish as confirmed by Pope Benedict XVI in Summorum Pontificum, which states "What earlier generations held as sacred, remains sacred and great for us too".

== In Eastern Christianity ==
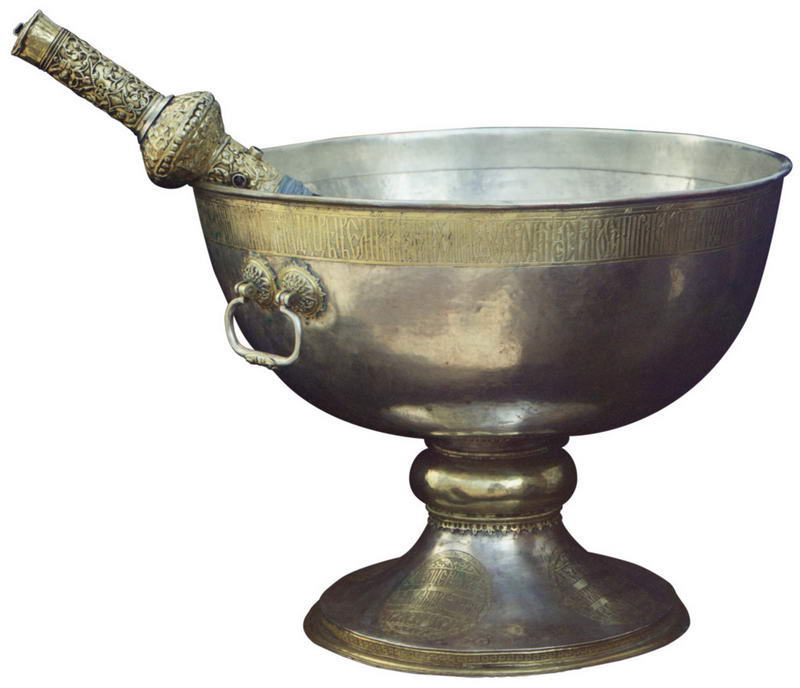
Vessel for holy water, with aspergillum, donation of Tsar Mikhail I Fyodorovich of Russia (Moscow, photo by Sergey Prokudin-Gorsky)

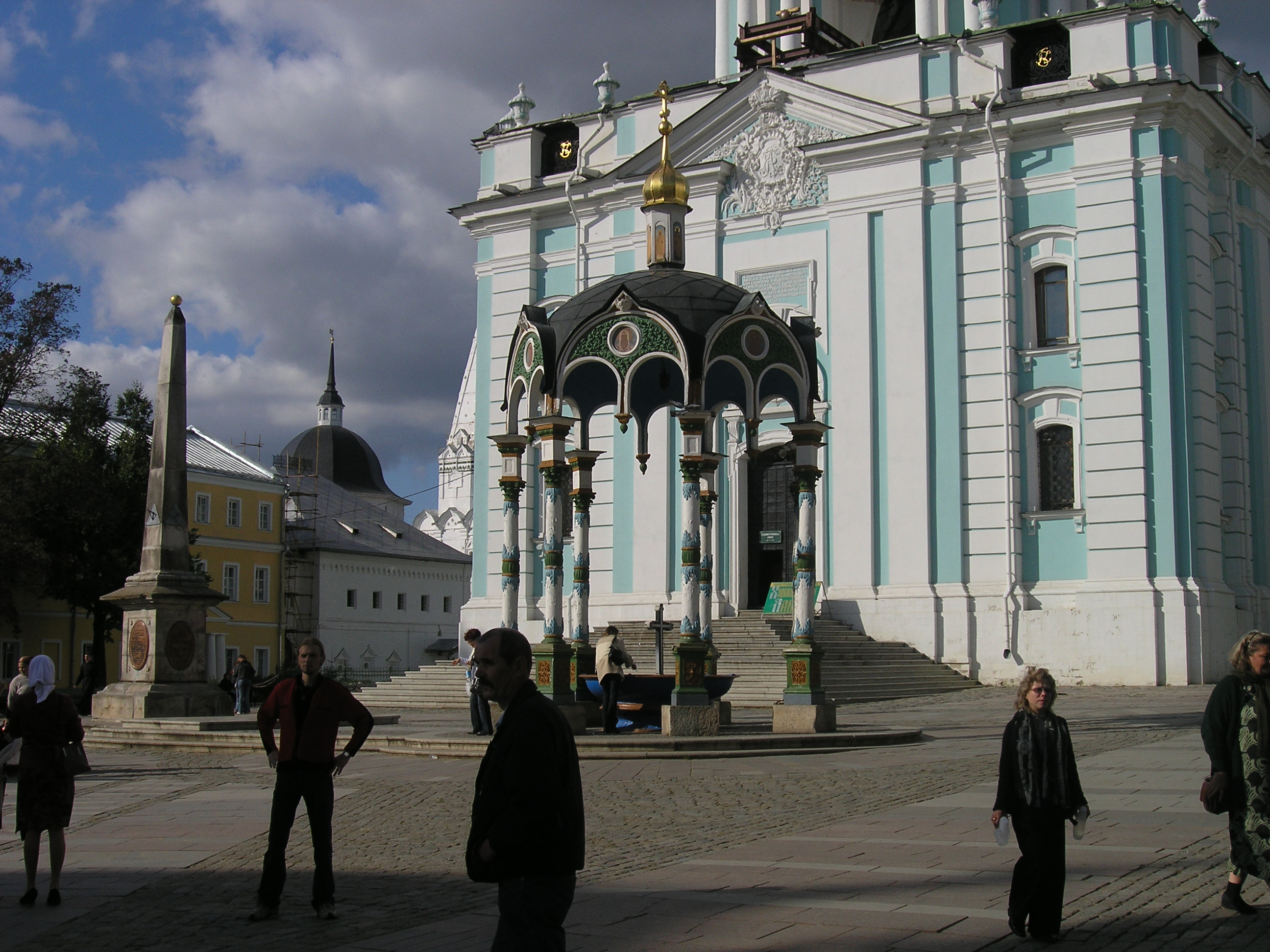
Fountain with holy water. Trinity-St. Sergius Lavra. Sergiev Posad, Russia.

Among Eastern Orthodox, Eastern Lutheran and Eastern Catholic Christians, holy water is blessed in the church and given to the faithful to drink at home when needed and to bless their homes. In the weeks following the Feast of Epiphany, clergy visit the homes of parishioners and conduct a service of blessing by using the holy water that was blessed on the Feast of Theophany. For baptism, the water is sanctified with a special blessing.

Throughout the centuries, there have been many springs of water that have been believed by members of the Orthodox Church to be miraculous. Some still flow to this day, such as the one at Pochaev Lavra in Ukraine, and the Life-Giving Spring of the Theotokos in Constantinople (commemorated annually with the blessing of holy water on Bright Friday).

Although Eastern Orthodox and Byzantine Catholics do not normally bless themselves with holy water upon entering a church like Roman Catholics do, a quantity of holy water is typically kept in a font placed in the narthex (entrance) of the church, where it is available for anyone who would like to take some of it home with them. It is customary for Orthodox and Byzantine Catholics to drink holy water, to use it in their cooking and to sprinkle their houses with it.

Often, when objects are blessed in the church (such as the palms on Palm Sunday, Icons or sacred vessels) the blessing is completed by a triple sprinkling with holy water using the words, "This (name of item) is blessed by the sprinkling of this holy water, in the name of the Father, and of the Son, and of the Holy Spirit."

Holy water is sometimes sprinkled on items or people when they are blessed outside the church building, as part of the prayers of blessing. In Russia, it is common for Orthodox Christians to bring newly bought cars to the church for blessing. Holy water is sprinkled inside and out, as well as under the hood. Similarly, in Alaska, the fishing boats are sprinkled with holy water at the start of the fishing season as the priest prays for the crews' safety and success. Some Catholics also have a priest bless their cars or homes with holy water as a way of invoking God's blessing and protection.

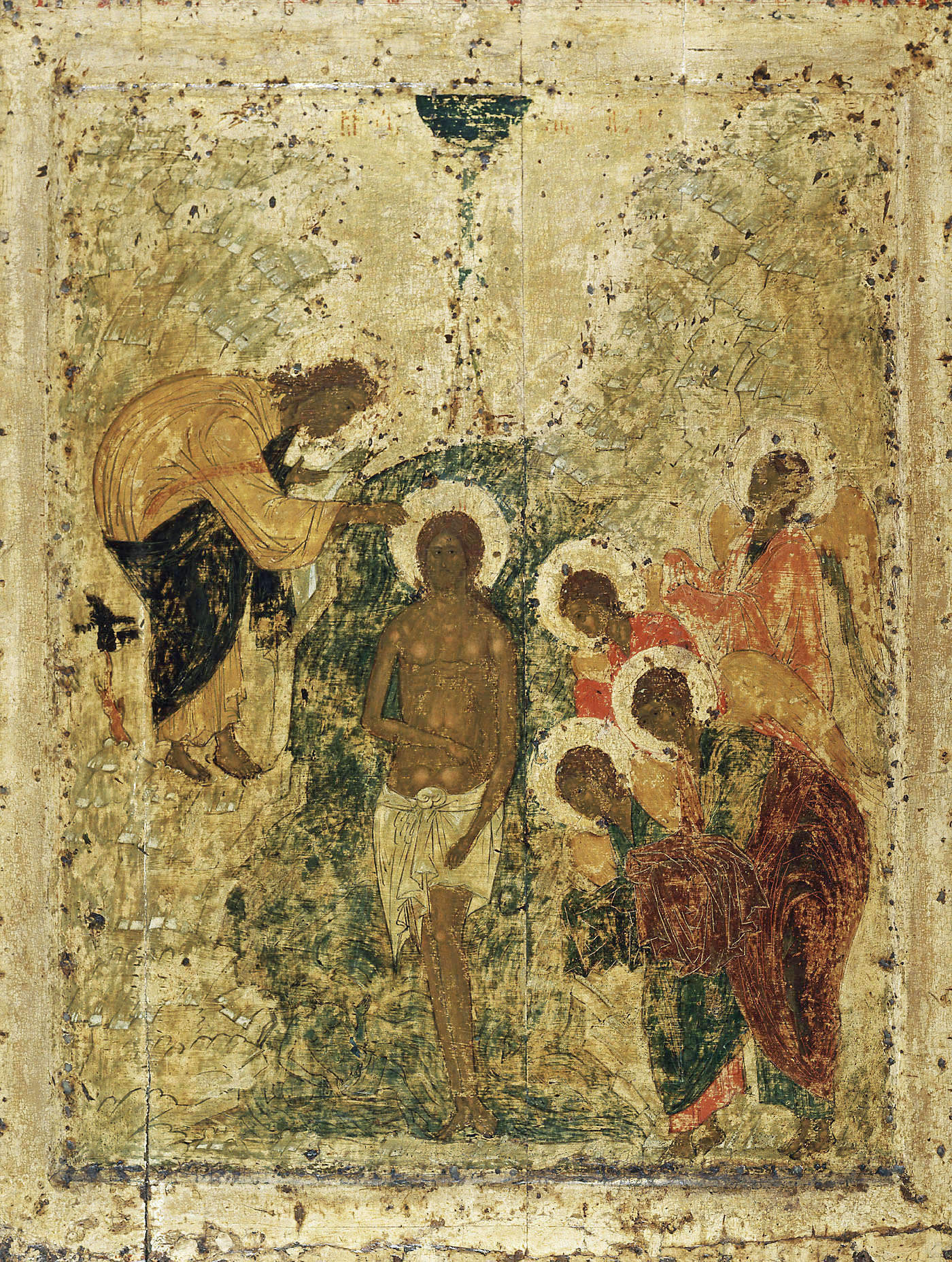
Icon of the Theophany by St. Andrei Rublev, c. 1360, in the Cathedral of the Annunciation, Moscow

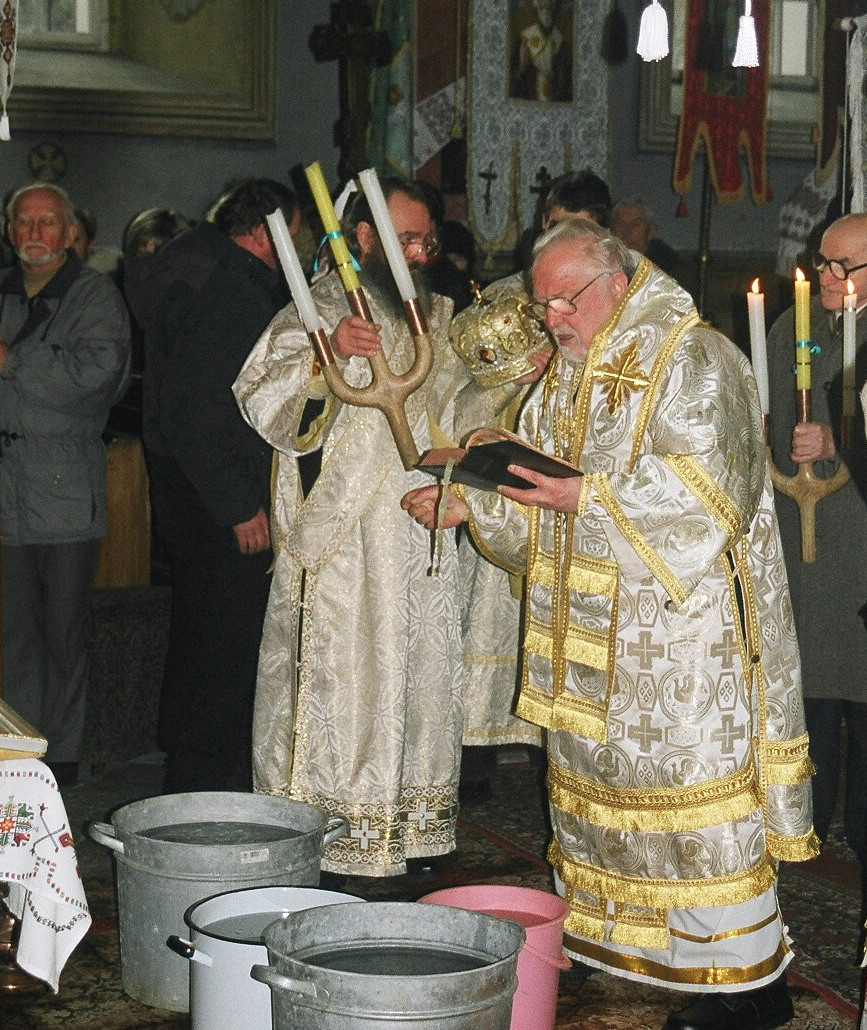
Polish Orthodox archbishop blessing the waters on the Eve of Theophany with a triple candlestick – "King Candles"

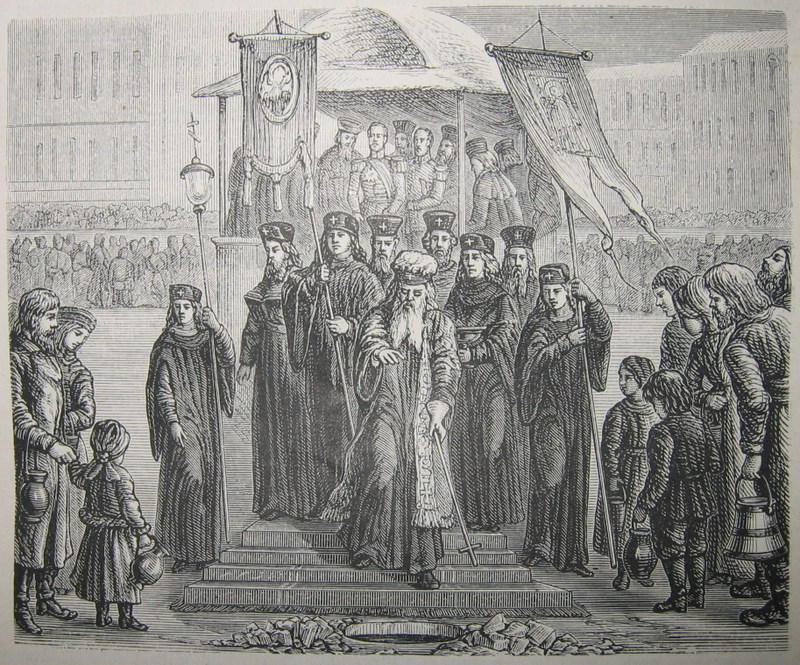
Blessing the Waters of the Neva on Theophany (Today's Russia, Lankenau and Oelsnitz, Leipzig, 1876)

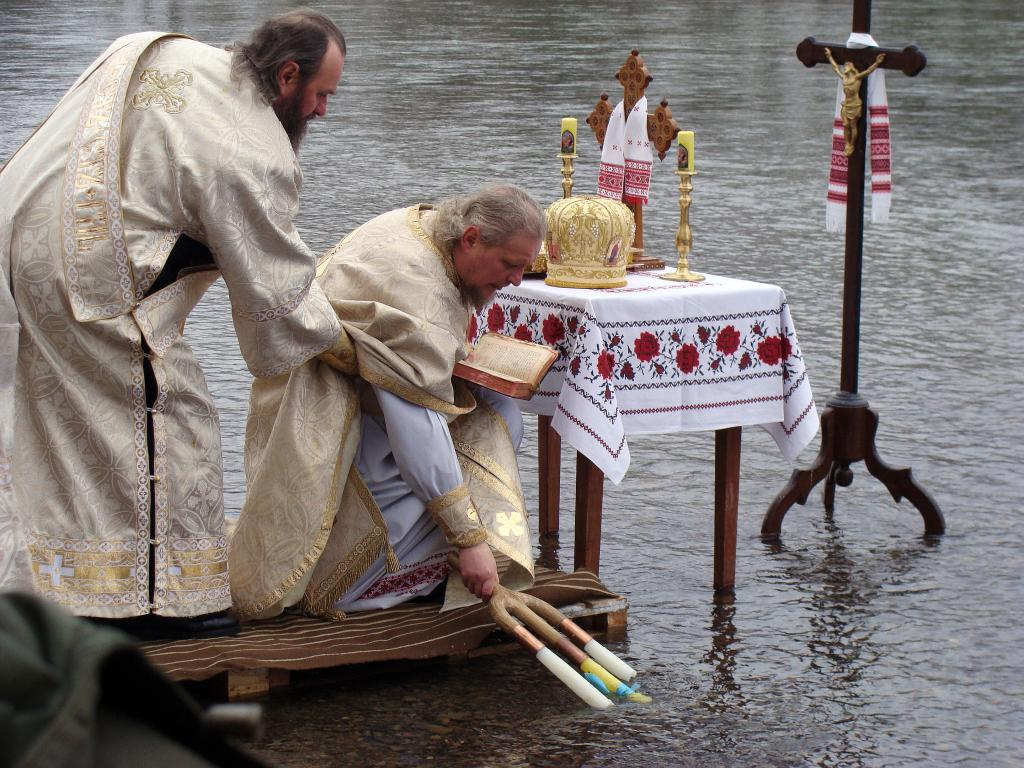
Great Blessing of Waters on the Sanok river on the Day of Theophany

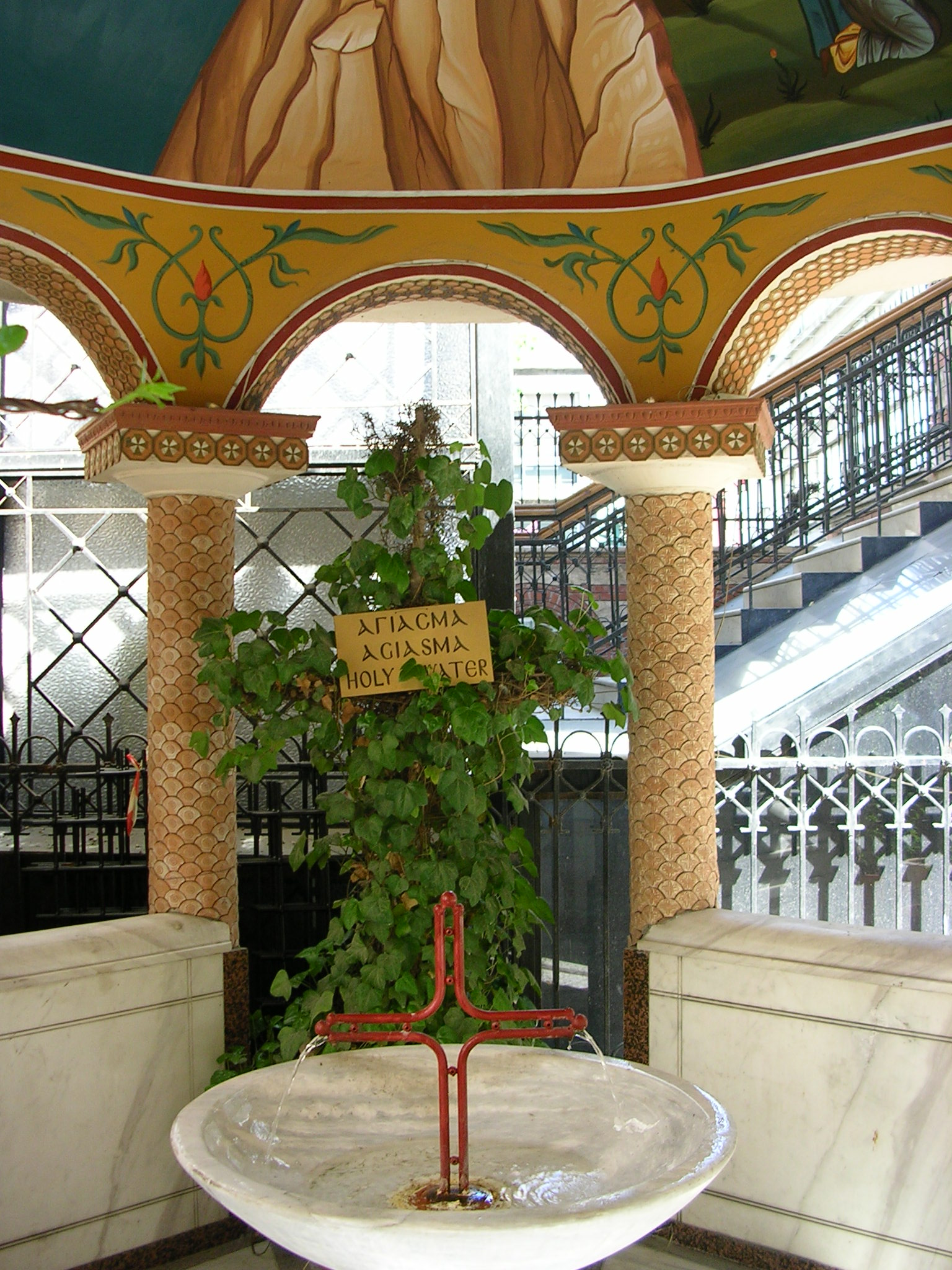
Fountain with Holy Water in Thessaloniki

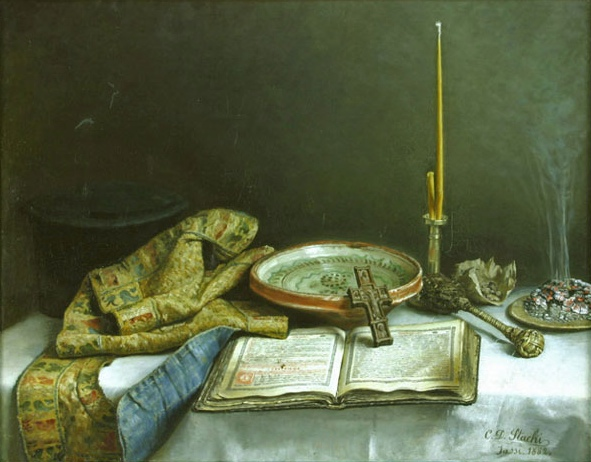
Holy Water, painting by Constantin Daniel Stahi (1882) showing the implements used in the blessing of holy water. From left to right: A priest's kamilavka and epitrachelion (stole), Euchologion, bowl of water, blessing cross, candle, aspergillum made of basil branches, incense (Muzeul Naţional de Artă, Bucharest).

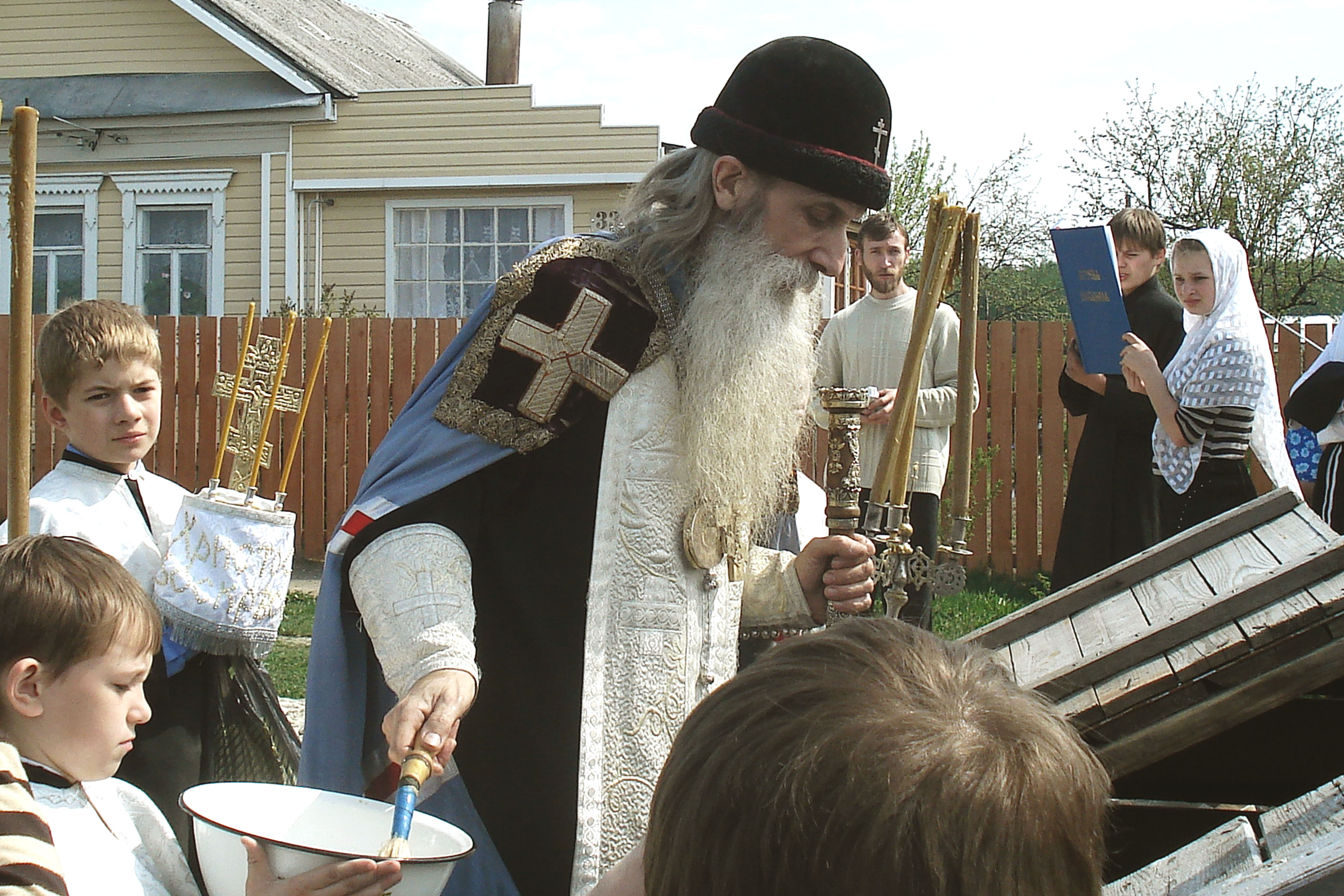
Metropolitan Korniliy, the head of Russian Orthodox Old-Rite Church, consecrating a well

=== Blessings ===
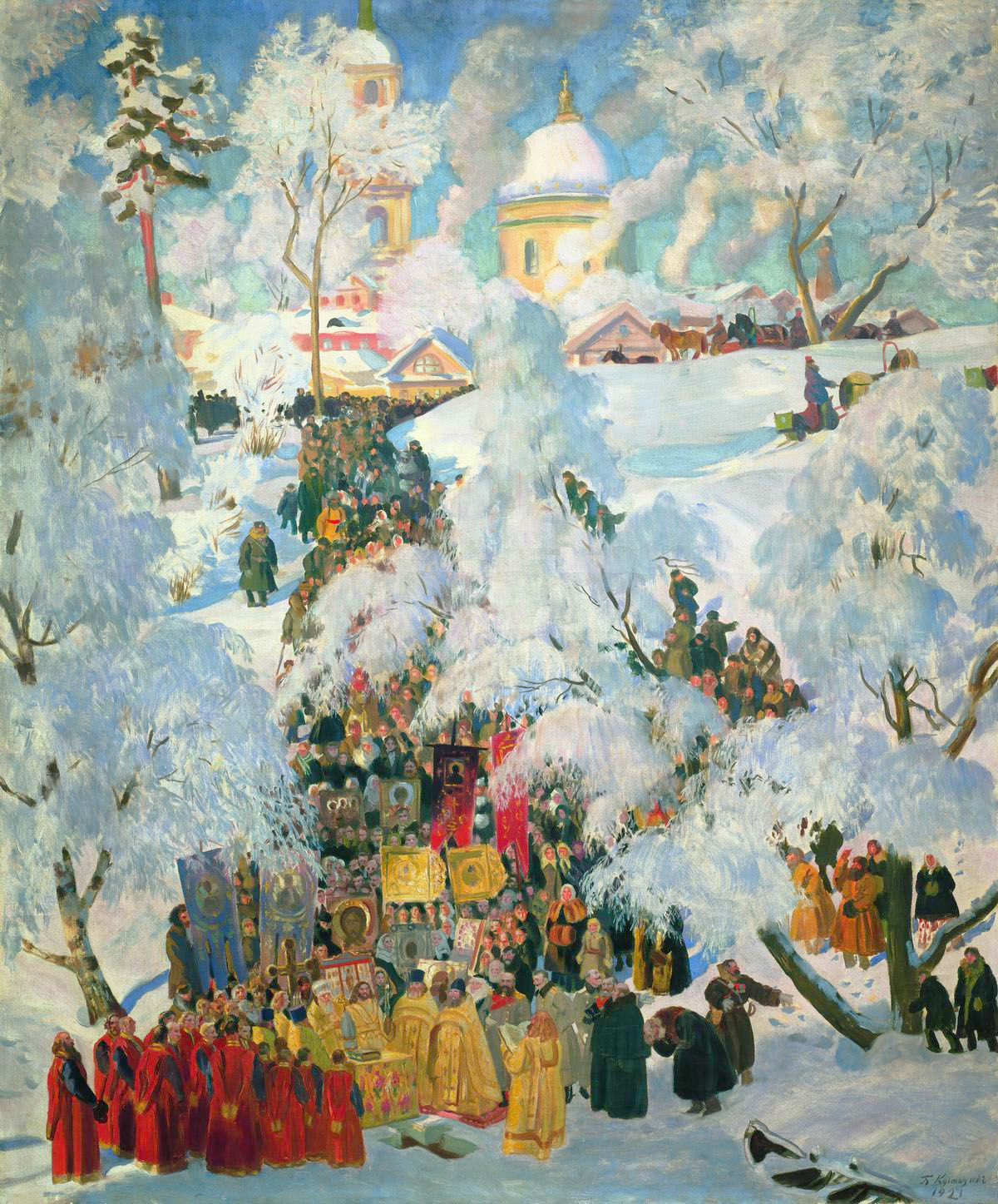
Great Blessing of Waters (1921 painting by Boris Kustodiev)

Orthodox Christians most often bless themselves with holy water by drinking it. It is traditional to keep a quantity of it at home, and many Orthodox Christians will drink a small amount daily with their morning prayers. It may also be used for informal blessings when no clergy are present. For example, parents might bless their children with holy water before they leave the house for school or play. It is also often taken with prayer in times of distress or temptation.

There are two rites for blessing holy water: the Great Blessing of Waters which is held on the Feast of Theophany, and the Lesser Blessing of Waters which is conducted according to need during the rest of the year. Both forms are based upon the Rite of Baptism. Certain feast days call for the blessing of Holy Water as part of their liturgical observance.

The use of holy water is based on the Baptism of Jesus by John the Baptist in the River Jordan, and the Orthodox interpretation of this event. In their view, John's baptism was a baptism of repentance, and the people came to have their sins washed away by the water. Since Jesus had no sin, but was God incarnate, his baptism had the effect not of washing away Jesus' sins, but of blessing the water, making it holy—and with it all of creation, so that it may be used fully for its original created purpose to be an instrument of life.

Jesus' baptism is commemorated in the Eastern Orthodox churches at the Feast of Theophany (literally "manifestation of God") on January 6 (for those Orthodox Christians who use the Julian Calendar, January 6 falls on the Gregorian Calendar date of January 19). At the Vespers of this feast, a font of holy water is typically blessed in the church, to provide holy water for the parish's use in the coming year. The next morning, after the Divine Liturgy a procession goes from the church to a nearby river, lake or other body of water, to bless that water as well. This represents the redemption of all creation as part of humanity's salvation.

In the following weeks, the priest typically visits the homes of the members of the parish and leads prayers of blessing for their families, homes (and even pets), sprinkling them with holy water. Again, this practice is meant to visibly represent God's sanctifying work in all parts of the people's lives.

=== Great Blessing of Waters at Theophany ===
On the Great Feast of Theophany (Epiphany), holy water is blessed twice: at the conclusion of the Divine Liturgy on the eve of the feast, and on morning of the feast itself. After processing to the place where the vessel of water is prepared, to the singing of appropriate troparia (hymns) of the Theophany, there are a group of Scripture readings (Isaiah 35:1–10, Isaiah 55:1–13, Isaiah 12:3–6, and 1 Corinthians 10:1–4), culminating in the baptism account from the Gospel of Saint Mark (1:9–11) followed by the Great Litany. This is sung just as at the beginning of the Divine Liturgy, but with the following additional petitions which make clear what is being asked of God and what the use, purpose, and blessing of the water is believed to entail.

That these waters may be sanctified by the power, and effectual operation, and descent of the Holy Spirit, let us pray to the Lord.
That there may descend upon these waters the cleansing operation of the super-substantial Trinity, let us pray to the Lord.
That he will endue them with the grace of redemption, the blessing of Jordan, the might, and operation, and descent of the Holy Spirit, let us pray to the Lord.
That Satan may speedily be crushed under our feet, and that every evil counsel directed against us may be brought to naught, let us pray to the Lord.
That the Lord our God will free us from every attack and temptation of the enemy, and make us worthy of the good things which he hath promised, let us pray to the Lord.
That he will illumine us with the light of understanding and of piety, and with the descent of the Holy Spirit, let us pray to the Lord.
That the Lord our God will send down the blessing of Jordan, and sanctify these waters, let us pray to the Lord.
That this water may be unto the bestowing of sanctification; unto the remission of sins; unto the healing of soul and body; and unto every expedient service, let us pray to the Lord.
That this water may be a fountain welling forth unto life eternal, let us pray to the Lord.
That it may manifest itself effectual unto the averting of every machination of our foes, whether visible or invisible, let us pray to the Lord.
For those who shall draw of it and take of it unto the sanctification of their homes, let us pray to the Lord.
That it may be for the purification of the souls and bodies of all those who, with faith, shall draw and partake of it, let us pray to the Lord.
That he will graciously enable us to perfect sanctification by participation in these waters, through the invisible manifestation of the Holy Spirit, let us pray to the Lord.

Then, following a lengthy set of didactic prayers that expound on the nature of the feast and summarize salvation history, praising God's creation of and mastery over the elements, the priest makes the Sign of the Cross over the water with his hand and prays specifically for the blessing to be invoked upon it. At the climax of the service, he immerses the hand cross into the water three times in imitation of Christ's baptism to the singing of the festal troparion:

When Thou wast baptized in the Jordan, O Lord,

The worship of the Trinity was made manifest.

For the voice of the Father bore witness to Thee,

And called Thee His beloved Son.

And the Spirit, in the form of a dove,

Confirmed the truthfulness of His word.

O Christ God, Who hast revealed Thyself,

And hast enlightened the world, glory be to Thee!

In Greek:

Εν Ιορδάνη βαπτιζομένου Σου, Κύριε,

Η της Τριάδος εφανερώθη προσκύνησις.

Του γαρ γεννήτορος η φωνή προσεμαρτύρει Σοι,

αγαπητόν Σε Υιόν ονομάζουσα.

Και το Πνεύμα εν είδει περιστεράς,

Εβεβαίου του λόγου το ασφαλές.

Ο επιφανής, Χριστέ, ο Θεός,

Και τον κόσμον φωτίσας, δοξα Σοι

The priest then blesses the entire church and congregation with the newly consecrated water. All come forward to be sprinkled over the head with the Theophany Water as they kiss the hand cross, and to drink some of it.

The priest will then set out to bless the homes of all of the faithful with Theophany Water. In large parishes, this process will take some time. However, the priest must bless all of the houses of the faithful before the beginning of Great Lent. In monasteries the Hegumen (Superior) will bless the cells of all of the monks.

Orthodox Christianity teaches that the Great Blessing of Waters actually changes the nature of the water, and that water so blessed is no longer corruptible, but remains fresh for many years.

The Great Blessing of Waters normally takes place only at this one time of the year; however, at the Consecration of a church, a Great Blessing of Waters will often precede the service.

=== Lesser Blessing of Waters ===
The Lesser Blessing is called "lesser" not because it is shorter (in fact, it is not), but because it does not have the same solemnity as the Great Blessing, and does not necessarily change the nature of the water.

While much is the same, the rite begins with Psalm 142 (LXX) and the hymns to the Theophany of the Great Blessing are replaced in the Lesser Blessing with hymns to the Theotokos. The scriptural readings are different (Hebrews 2:11–18, John 5:1–4), and the special petitions at the Great Litany are different:

That these waters may be sanctified by the power, and effectual operation, and descent of the Holy Spirit, let us pray to the Lord.

That there may descend upon these waters the cleansing operation of the super-substantial Trinity, let us pray to the Lord.

That this water may be unto the healing of souls and bodies, and unto the banishing of every hostile power, let us pray to the Lord.

That the Lord our God will send down the blessing of Jordan, and sanctify these waters, let us pray to the Lord.

For all those who entreat of God's aid and protection, let us pray to the Lord.

That he will illumine us with the light of understanding, with the consubstantial Trinity, let us pray to the Lord.

That the Lord our God will show us forth sons and heirs of his kingdom, through partaking of and sprinkling with these waters, let us pray to the Lord.

Then the priest says a prayer very similar to the one used at Theophany, but when he immerses the hand cross into the water three times, instead of singing the troparion of Theophany, he sings the troparion of the Cross:

Save, O Lord, Thy people and bless Thine inheritance, granting unto the faithful victory over enemies. And by the power of Thy Cross, do Thou preserve Thy commonwealth.

The Lesser Blessing of Waters may be performed according to need. It is specifically called for on August 1 (the feast of the Procession of the Cross); on Bright Friday (Friday in Easter Week) which is the feast of the Theotokos of the "Life-giving Spring"; and on the Feast of Mid-Pentecost, when all of the fields are blessed. There is also a tradition of blessing Holy Water on the first day of each month.

Though there is no special blessing said over it, the water used for the Washing of Feet on Maundy Thursday could be considered a form of holy water, in that the Bishop or Hegumen will bless the faithful with it at the end of the ceremony. Among the Coptics, this water is blessed with the cross before the Washing of Feet. The Coptics also sprinkle the faithful with holy water on Palm Sunday, and at the end of every Divine Liturgy.

=== In the Ethiopian Orthodox Tewahedo Church ===
Holy water is important to the Ethiopian Orthodox Tewahedo Church and regarded as healing from demonic possession and for treating sick people, particularly in cases of mental illness. It can be consumed or poured over someone supposed to be afflicted by harmful things. A majority of studies show that many Ethiopians prefer holy water for biomedical purposes, especially for treatment of HIV/AIDS. Pilgrims visit different monasteries such as Tsadkane Mariam and Entoto Kidane Mehret to acquire holy water.

Besides, holy water also used for Ethiopian Orthodox holidays such as Timkat (Epiphany) where Christians gather at notable squares and churches and priests bless holy water and spatter them. In Gondar, the Fasilides Bath is used to bathe and represents the Jordan River.

== In Protestantism ==
=== Evangelical-Lutherans ===
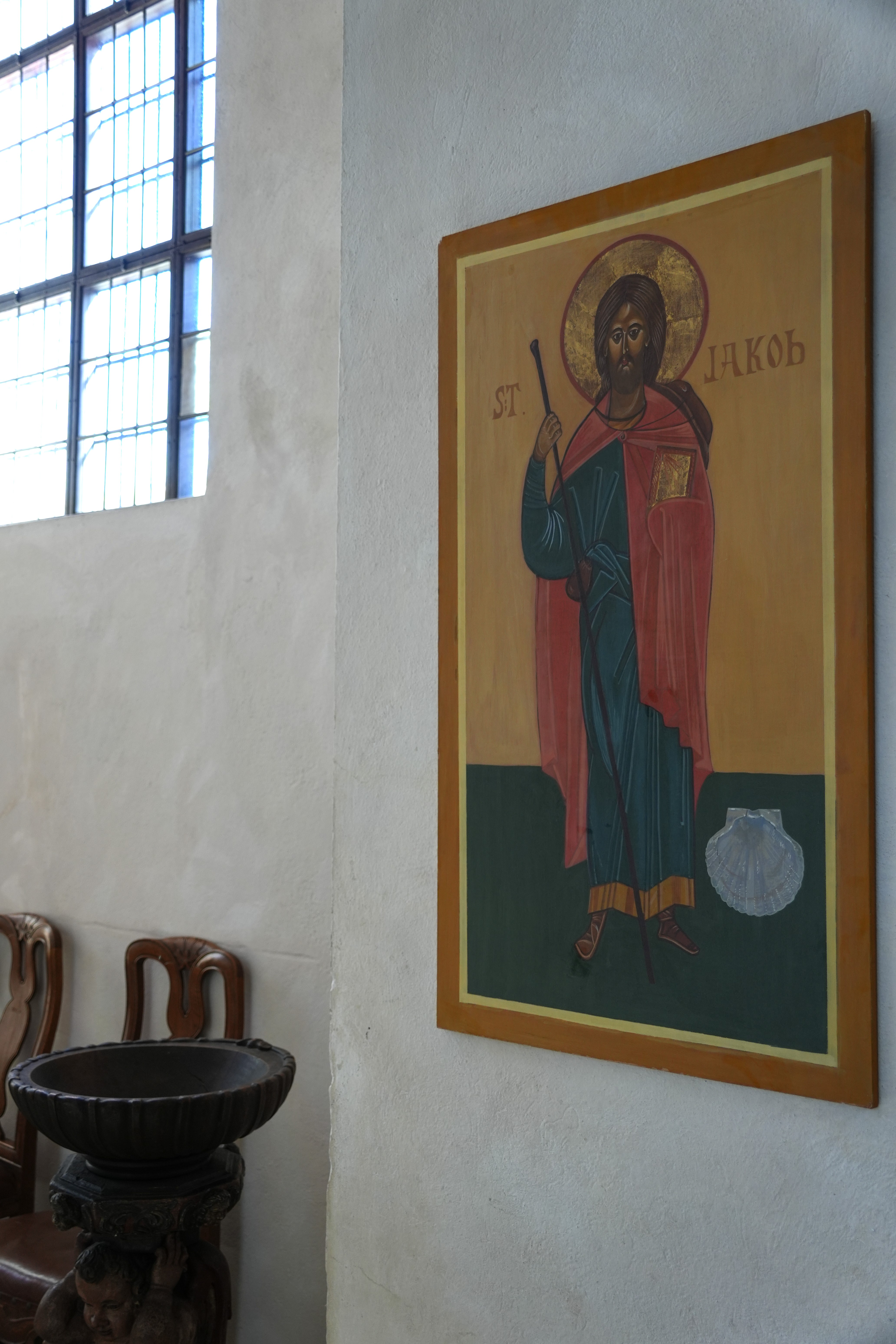
A holy water font next to an icon of Saint James the Great at Saint James's Church (Evangelical-Lutheran) in Stockholm

The use of holy water in a number synods of Evangelical-Lutheranism is for the baptism of infants and new members of the church. The water is believed to be blessed by God, as it is used in a sacrament. The water is applied to the forehead of the laity being baptised and the minister performs the sign of the cross. Evangelical-Lutherans tend to have baptismal water fonts or holy water fonts near the entrance of the church where congregrants bless themselves (through the sign of the cross) upon entering it, in order to recall the salvific grace of baptism.

Other synods do not use holy water but do typically treat the water used for baptisms in a respectful manner.

A holy water font at the entance of the nave of Kummelby Church (Evangelical-Lutheran) in Sollentuna, Sweden

A holy water font at the entrance of the nave of Vadstena Abbey Church (Evangelical-Lutheran) in Vättern, Sweden

=== Anglicans ===
Although "Holy water" is not a term used in official rites of the Church of England, font water is sanctified in the Church of England baptism rite. In contrast, the Episcopal Church (United States) does expressly mention the optional use of holy water in some recent liturgies of blessing. More generally, the use of water within High Church Anglicanism or Anglo-Catholicism adheres closely to Roman Catholic practice. In many Anglican churches baptismal water is used for the asperges. A widely used Anglo-Catholic manual, Ritual Notes, first published by A. R. Mowbray in 1894, discusses the blessing and use of holy water. In addition to "the pious custom" of blessing oneself on entering and leaving a church "in memory of our baptism and in token of the purity of heart with which we should worship Almighty God", the book commends that "Holy water should be obtained from the parish priest, may be (and indeed should be) taken away and kept for use privately by the faithful in their homes." An English translation of the traditional rite for the blessing of water and salt, including the exorcisms, was included in the Anglican Missal. Shorter forms are found in A Priest's Handbook by Dennis G. Michno, and Ceremonies of the Eucharist by Howard E. Galley. Some parishes use a stoup, basin, or font to make holy water available for the faithful to use in blessing themselves, making the sign of the cross upon entering the church.

In the Book of Occasional Services of the Episcopal Church (United States), in the rite for Restoring of Things Profaned, the bishop or priest while processing around the church or chapel recites Psalm 118 with the antiphon Vidi aquam:

I saw water proceeding out of the temple; from the right side it flowed, alleluia; and all those to whom that water came shall be saved, and shall say, alleluia, alleluia.

A rubric directs that as each profaned object is addressed, "it may be symbolically cleansed by the use of signs of purification, such as water or incense."

=== Methodists ===
In the Methodist tradition, Holy Baptism is often administered by sprinkling or pouring holy water over the candidate. The official Baptismal Liturgy, as well as the liturgy for Reaffirmation of Baptism commonly done through asperges, has a prayer for the blessing of this water:

Pour out your Holy Spirit, to bless this gift of water and those who receive it, to wash away their sin and clothe them in righteousness throughout their lives, that, dying and being raised with Christ, they may share in his final victory. All praise to you, Eternal Father, through your Son Jesus Christ, who with you and the Holy Spirit lives and reigns for ever. Amen.

== Gallery ==
Stoups

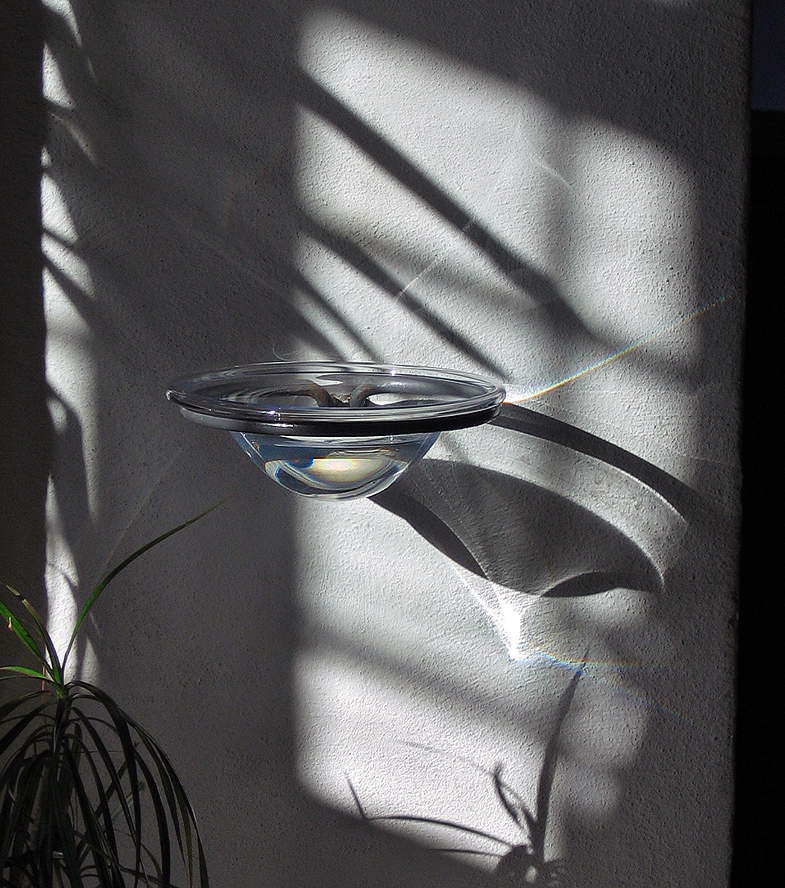
A glass bowl with Holy Water in the Catholic Church in Ystad

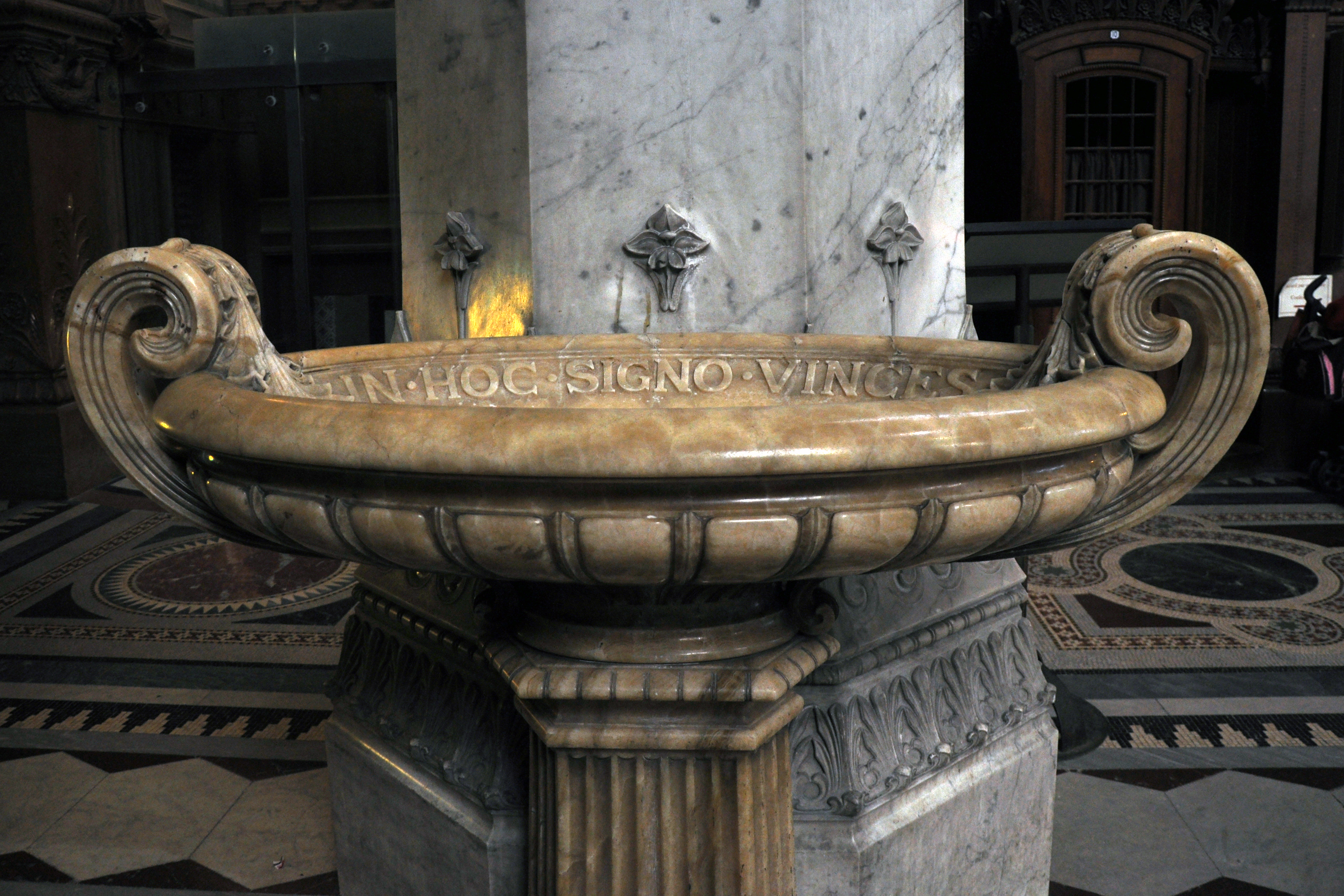
Basilica of Notre-Dame de Fourvière, Lyon, France

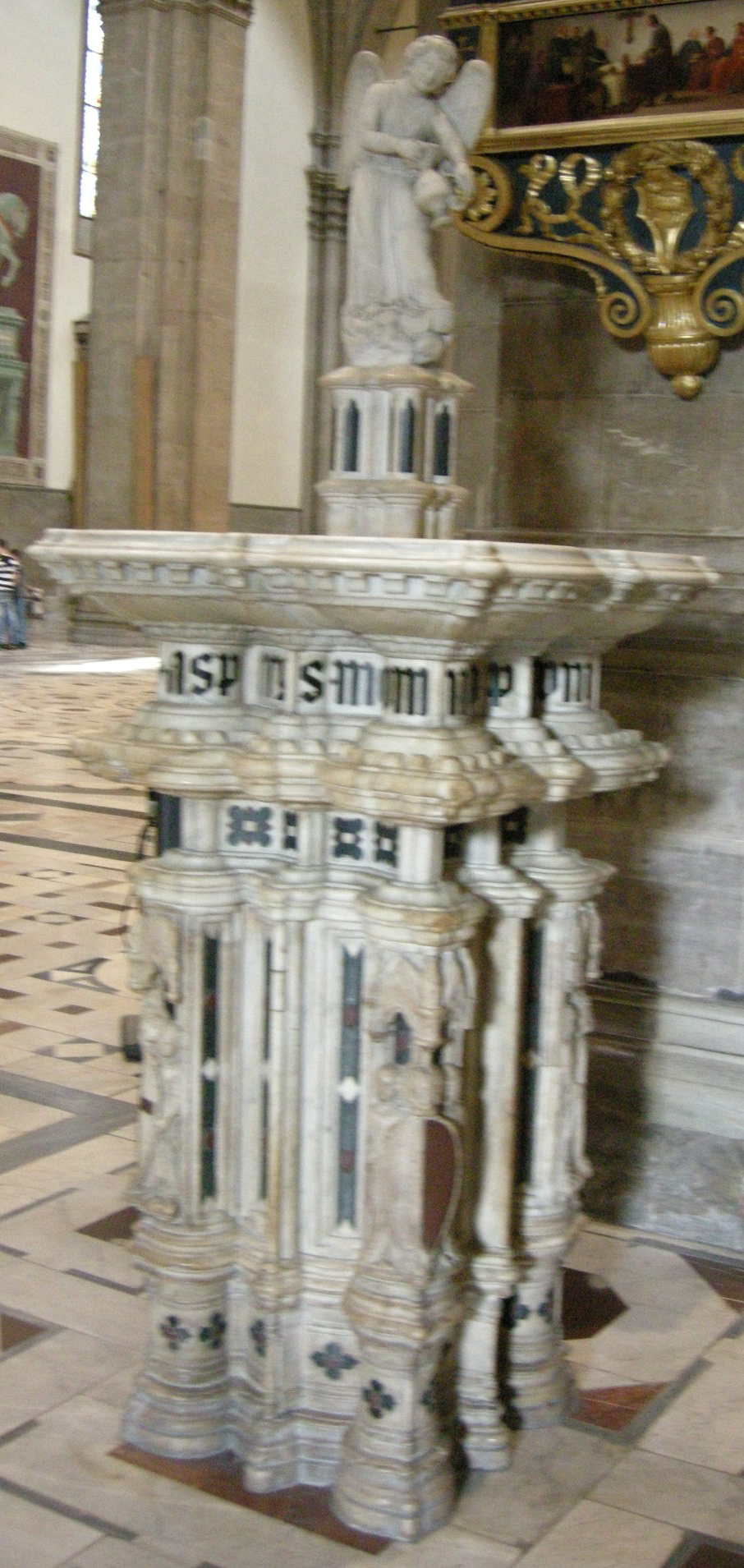
Florence Cathedral

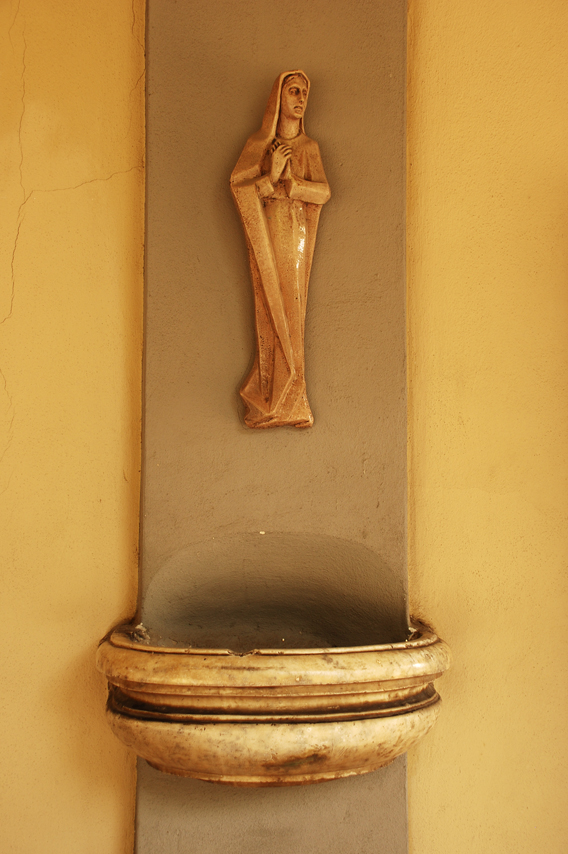
Church of Santa Maria a Cintoia, Florence, Italy

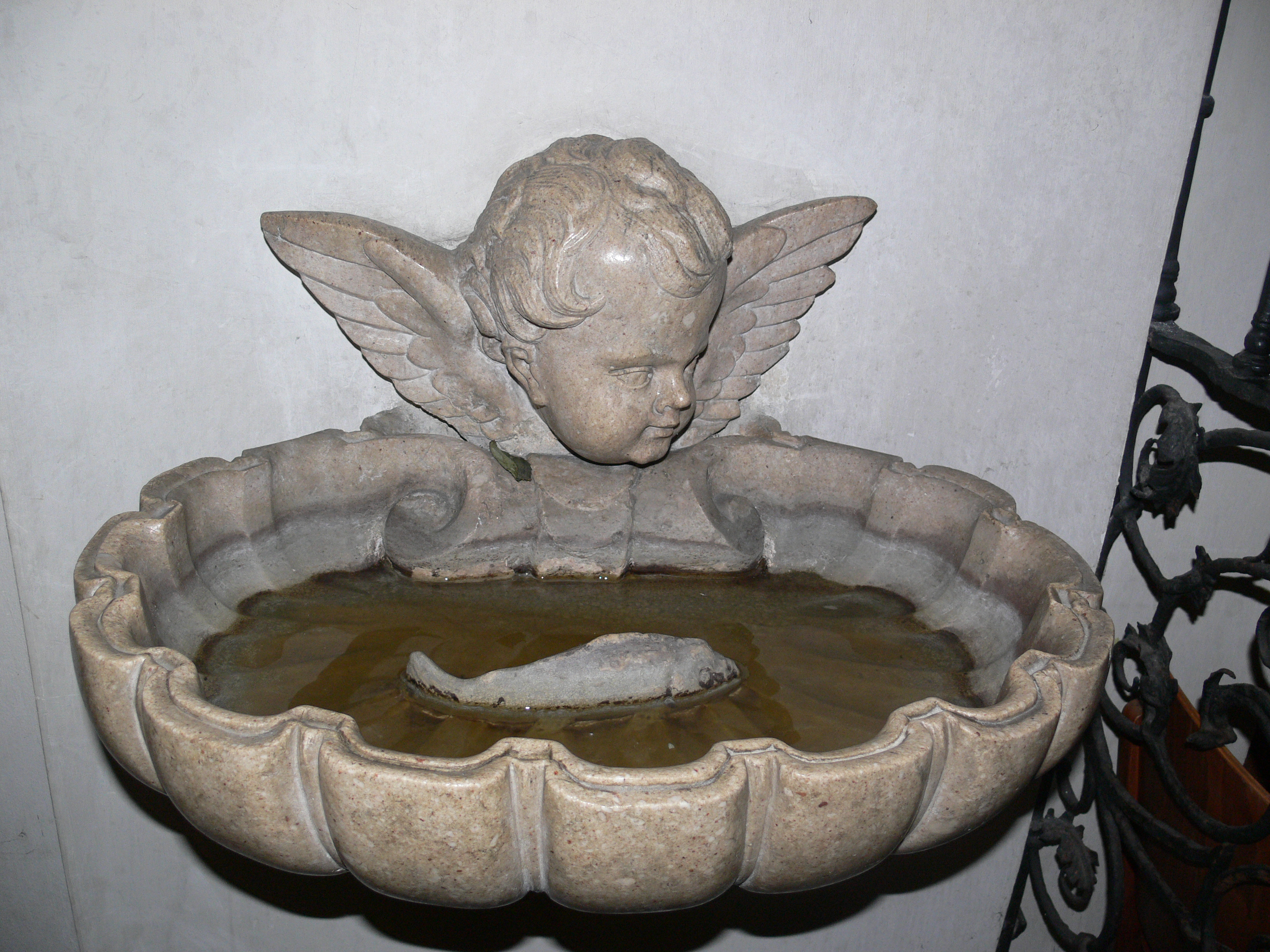
Church of Saints Saint Cajetan and Maximillian, Salzburg, Austria

== See also ==
- Holy water font
- Ablution in Christianity
- Aspergillum
- Anglican devotions
- Catholic devotions
- Exorcism in the Catholic Church
