= John the Deacon (6th century) =

John the Deacon (fl. 500) was a deacon in the Church of Rome during the pontificate of Pope Symmachus (498–514). He is known only from an epistle he wrote to a Senarius, a vir illustris who had asked him to explain aspects of Christian initiatory practice. John's response provides a "rather full description" of the catechumenal process and initiation rites at Rome at the beginning of the 6th century.

John describes his first-hand experience of the liturgical rites of initiation as practiced at Rome, and the theology behind them. Two specific rites, namely a cross traced on the forehead and a taste of blessed salt, marked the entrance into the catechumenate, "so the mind which is drenched and weakened by the waves of this world is held steady".

John also covers prebaptismal exorcisms; the anointing of the ears, nostrils, and breast of the candidate; the use of milk and honey for first communion; ritual nudity and immersion; special white clothing for the newly baptized; and the need for even infants to undergo the process, saying that "Their salvation should come through other people's profession, since their damnation came by another's fault."

== Sources ==
- Maxwell E. Johnson, The Rites of Christian Initiation: Their Evolution and Interpretation. Liturgical Press, 2nd ed. 2007, pp. 164–168.
