= Apostolic Church Fullness of God's Throne =

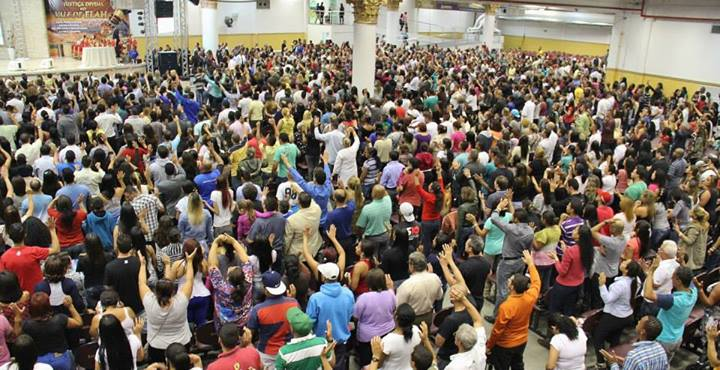
- Leader: Agenor Duque and Ingrid Duque
- Headquarters: São Paulo Brazil
- Origin: 2006
- Congregations: 10

Apostolic Church Fullness of God's Throne (In Portuguese: Igreja Apostólica Plenitude do Trono de Deus or IAPTD) is a neo-charismatic denomination founded in Brazil in 2006, by Agenor Duque and Ingrid Duque.

== History ==
Agenor Duque, former Minister of the World Church of the Power of God, (Igreja Mundial do Poder de Deus) has God-given a call for a new church. And followed his dream by following this vision he told his wife about what God had shown, believing in life called the bridegroom and his call to Ingrid Bishop dropped his personal dreams and projects, to live next to one of the bridegroom God's direction for their lives and their ministry, and thus founded the Apostolic Church Fullness of God's Throne on 7 September 2006.

== Media ==
The church rents programming on radio and television.

=== Radio ===
Acquired much of the programming of radio FM Musical, during the morning.

=== Television ===
Rented a few hours on television channels Mix TV, and on Saturdays on Channel Rede TV!.

== Congress Revival Fire ==
Congress Revival Fire for Brazil is an event organized by IAPTD, led by the apostle Agenor Duque and bishop Ingrid Duque. In the 5th edition in 2013 occurred on days 9, 12 and 13 January, and with the participation of the Israeli pastor and evangelist Benny Hinn and pastors Marco Feliciano, Abilio Santana and Yossef Akiva, and the singers: Thalles Roberto, David Quinlan, Cassiane, David Passamani, among others. Currently in 6th edition held between 1 and March 5, 2014, and was attended by various groups and singers of gospel music, and ministers of the word of God.
