= Sacramental =

Ritually blessed object or action

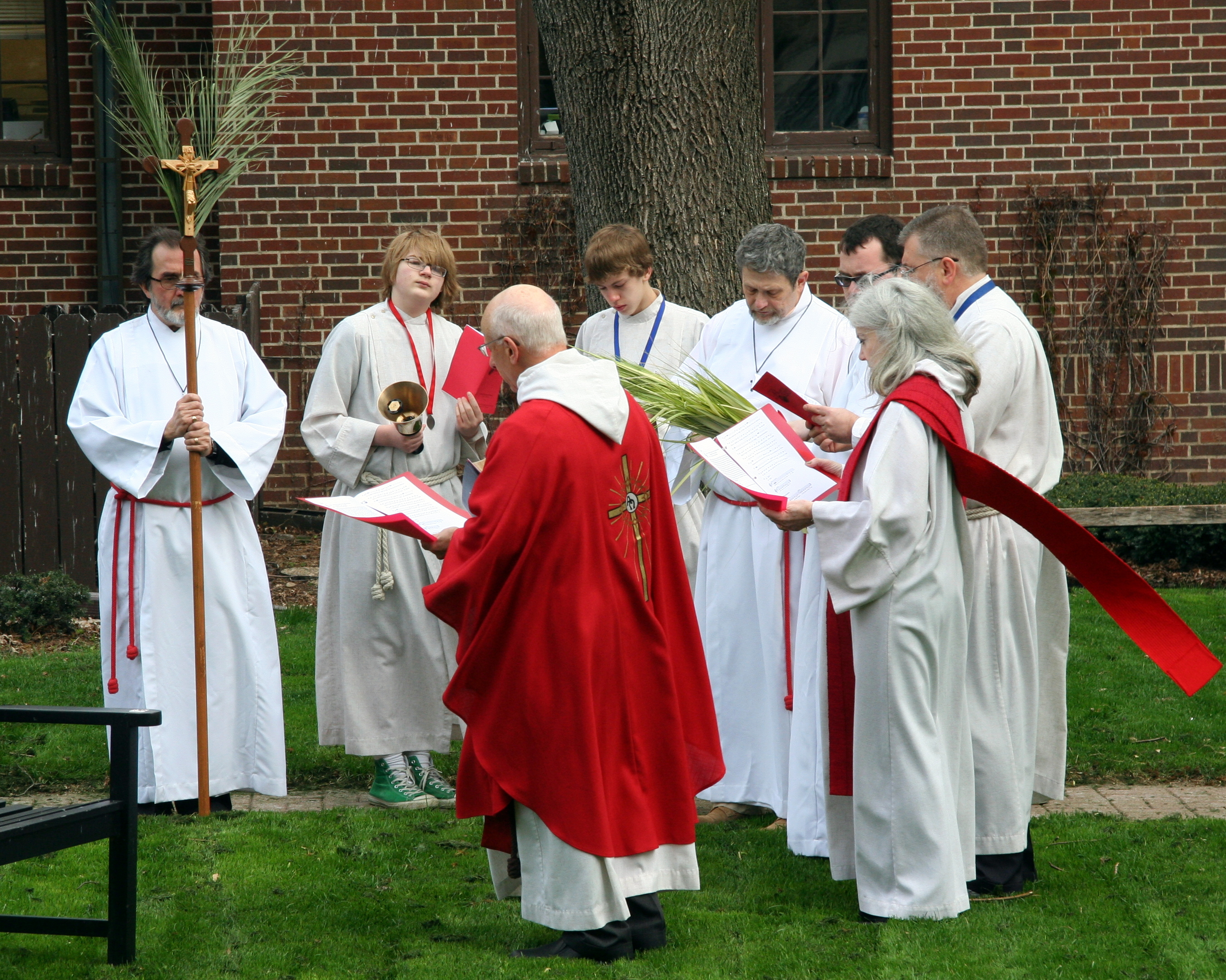
Blessing of the palms, a sacramental bestowed on Palm Sunday

A sacramental (Latin pl. sacramentalia) is a sacred sign, a ritual act or a ceremony, which, in a certain imitation of the sacraments, has a spiritual effect and is obtained through the intercession of the Church. Sacramentals surround the sacraments like a wreath and extend them into the everyday life of Christians. Sacramentals are recognised by the Catholic Church, the Eastern Orthodox Church, the Oriental Orthodox Churches, the Church of the East, the Lutheran churches, the Old Catholic Church, the Anglican churches, and Independent Catholic churches.

In the Bible, prayer cloths and holy oil are mentioned in reference to praying for healing. Holy water is a sacramental that the faithful use to recall their baptism; other common sacramentals include blessed candles (given to the faithful on Candlemas), blessed palms (blessed on the beginning of the procession on Palm Sunday), blessed ashes (bestowed on Ash Wednesday), a cross necklace (often taken to be blessed by a pastor before daily use), a headcovering (worn by women, especially during prayer and worship), blessed salt, and holy cards, as well as Christian art, especially a crucifix. Apart from those worn daily, such as a cross necklace or devotional scapular, sacramentals such as a family Bible, are often kept on home altars in Christian households. Ichthys emblems are sacramentals applied to vehicles to signify that the owner is a Christian and to offer protection while driving. When blessed in a betrothal ceremony, engagement rings become a sacramental.

As an adjective, sacramental means "of or pertaining to sacraments".

== Biblical basis ==
The Biblical basis for the use of sacramentals is that Jesus Christ used a form of sacramentals himself; for example, when he healed a blind man, he made a mud paste that he put over the eyes of the man, before telling him to wash in the Pool of Siloam.

Prayer cloths and holy oil are mentioned in reference to praying for healing, as in Acts 19:11–12 and James 5:14–15.

== Denominational usage ==
=== Catholic ===
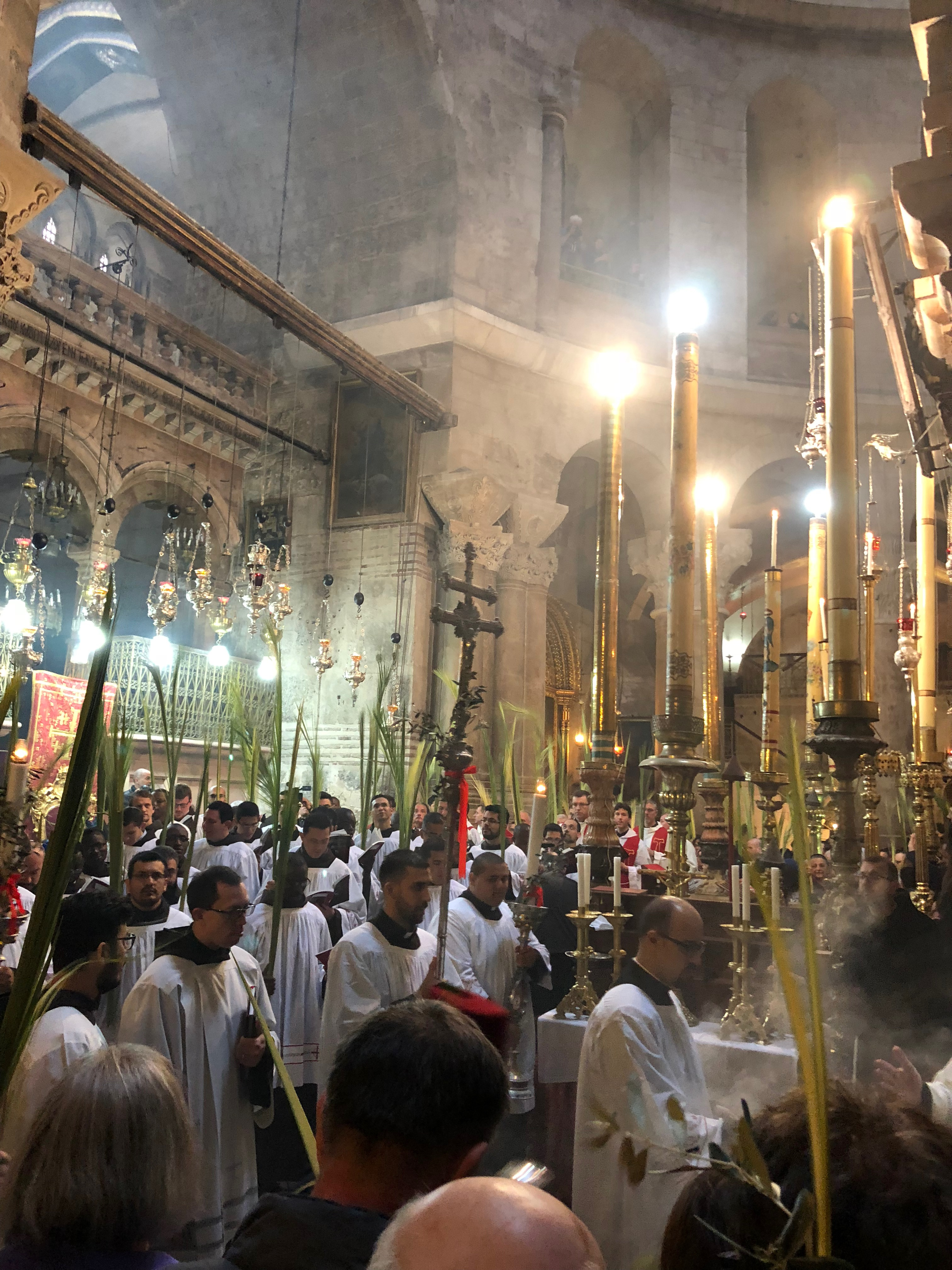
Palm procession at the Holy Sepulchre – both the procession and the palm branches are sacramentals

The Catholic Church defines sacramentals as

sacred signs which bear a resemblance to the sacraments: they signify effects, particularly of a spiritual nature, which are obtained through the Church's intercession. By them men are disposed to receive the chief effect of the sacraments, and various occasions in life are rendered holy.

Sacramentals do not confer the grace of the Holy Spirit in the way that the sacraments do, but by the Church's prayer, they prepare one to receive grace and dispose a person to cooperate with it. "For well-disposed members of the faithful, the liturgy of the sacraments and sacramentals sanctifies almost every event of their lives with the divine grace which flows from the Paschal mystery of the Passion, Death, and Resurrection of Christ. From this source all sacraments and sacramentals draw their power."

The Catechism of the Catholic Church lists three types of sacramentals: blessings, consecrations and dedications, and exorcisms. At the Second Vatican Council, the church called for the forms of each sacramental "to undergo a revision which takes into account the primary principle of enabling the faithful to participate intelligently, actively, and easily" and for new sacramentals to be adopted if a need for them "becomes apparent". In special circumstances and at the discretion of the ordinary, sacramentals may be administered by "qualified lay persons".

Rosary beads, scapulars, medals and religious images are more accurately termed devotional articles; prayers such as the rosary, the Stations of the Cross, litanies, and novenas are called popular devotions or "expressions of popular piety".

The Latin Church allows the bestowing of certain sacramentals, such as blessings, "to catechumens and even to non-Catholics unless there is a prohibition of the Church to the contrary.

Unlike the seven sacraments, which were instituted by Christ, sacramentals were instituted by the Church, which can modify their form and number; they do not confer sacramental grace, they do not act ex opere operato, but ex opere operantis of the single person and the whole Church. For example, while the water of Baptism causes the forgiveness of sins within the sacramental celebration, holy water, which is also a reminder of baptism, has no effect in itself, but depends on the faith of the person who receives it by making the sign of the cross at the entrance to the church.

=== Lutheran ===
In Lutheran churches, sacramentals such as palms and crosses, are used by the faithful.

=== Anglican ===
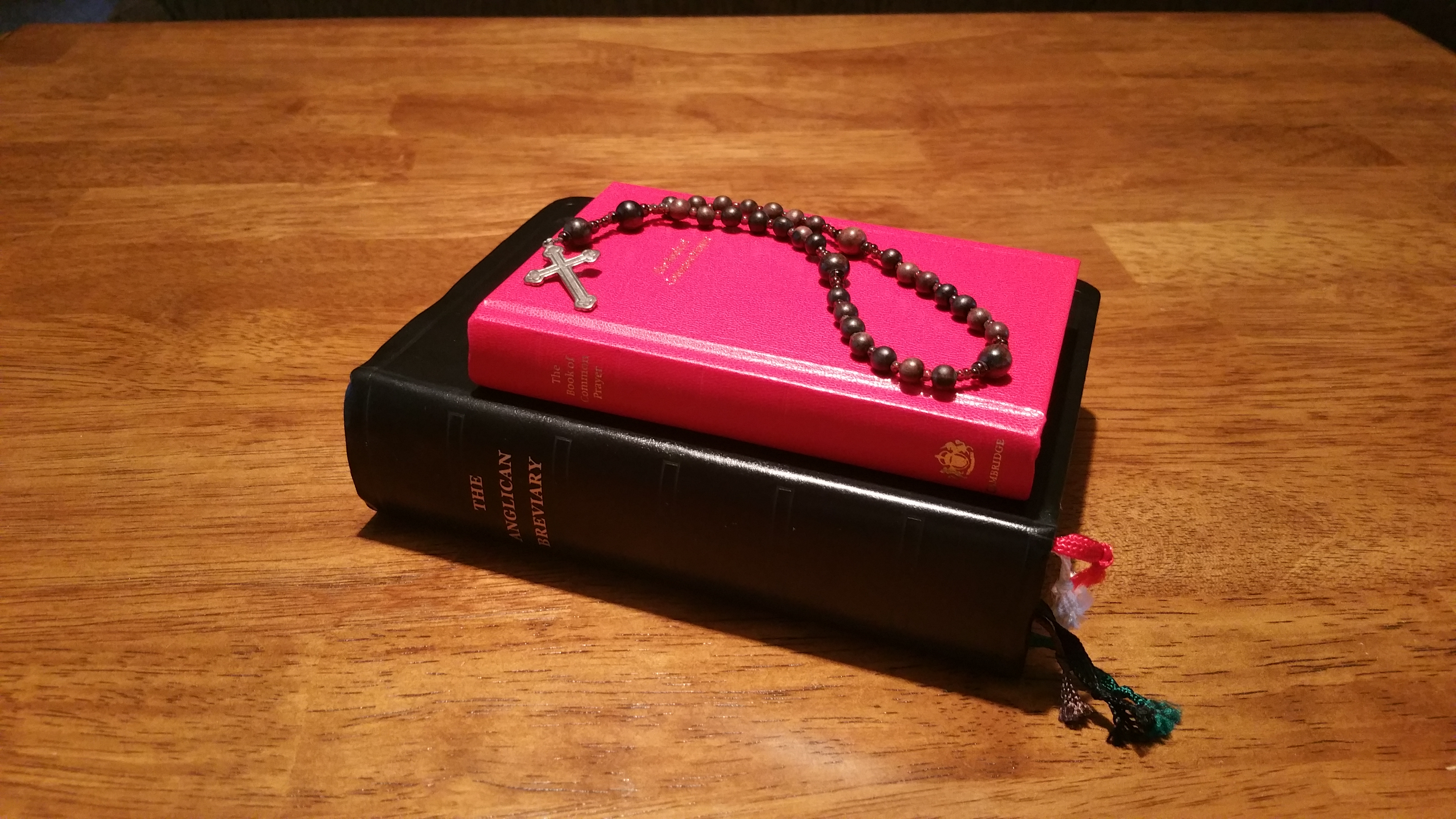
The Anglican Rosary sitting atop the Anglican Breviary and the Book of Common Prayer

A text of the Episcopal Church in the United States of America includes items such as the Anglican rosary, ashes, and palms among objects counted as sacramentals.

=== Pentecostal ===
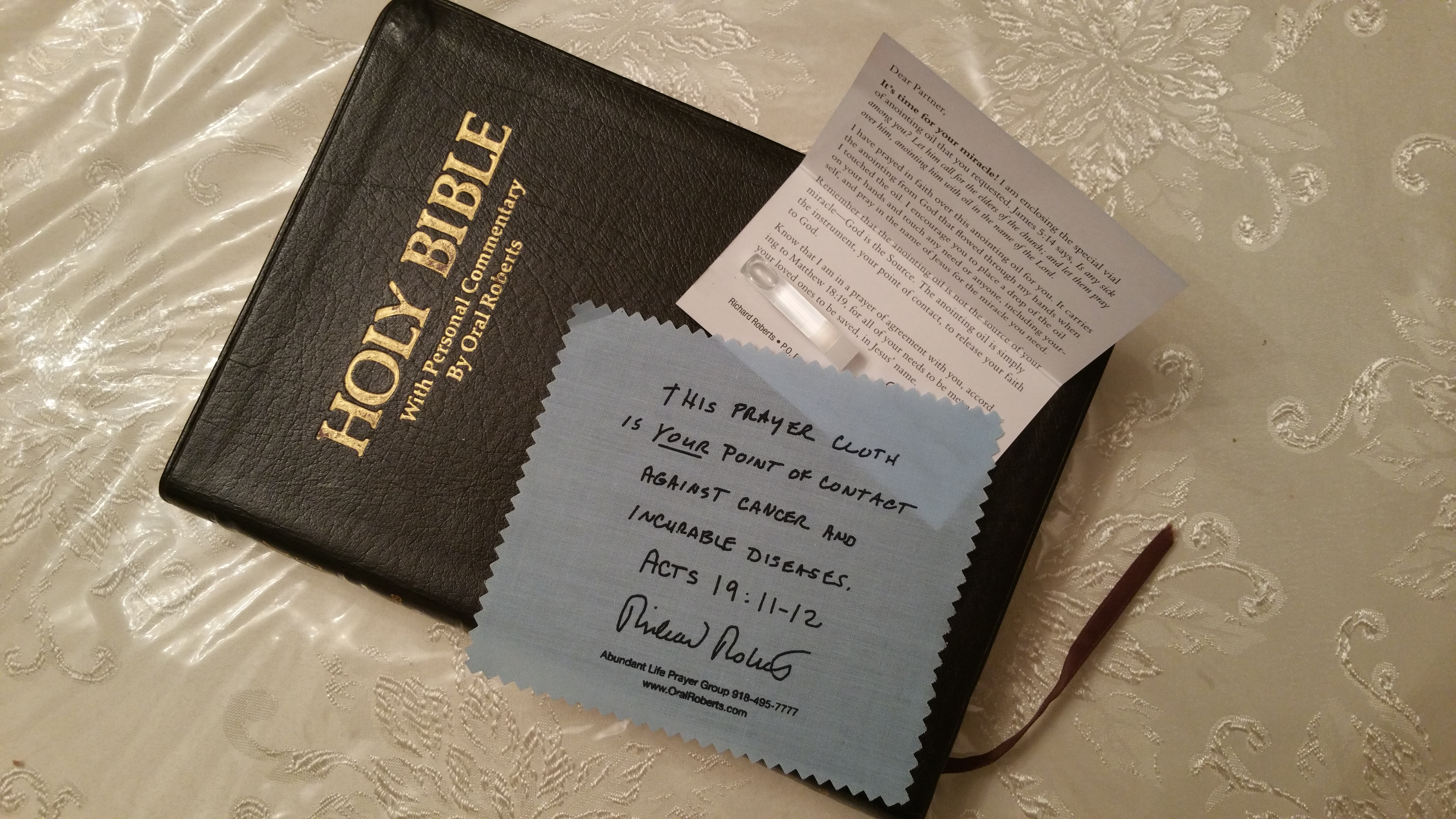
A blessed prayer cloth and holy anointing oil distributed by the Oral Roberts Evangelistic Association, a Pentecostal apostolate

Pentecostal theologian Mark Pearson states that the Bible speaks of sacramentals, sometimes referred to as points of contact, such as blessed prayer cloths (Acts 19:11–19:12) and holy oil (James 5:14). He states that God is the source of healing and that Pentecostal clergy "can confidently offer prayer, administer the various sacramentals, and lay hands on the sick".
