= Prayer cloth =

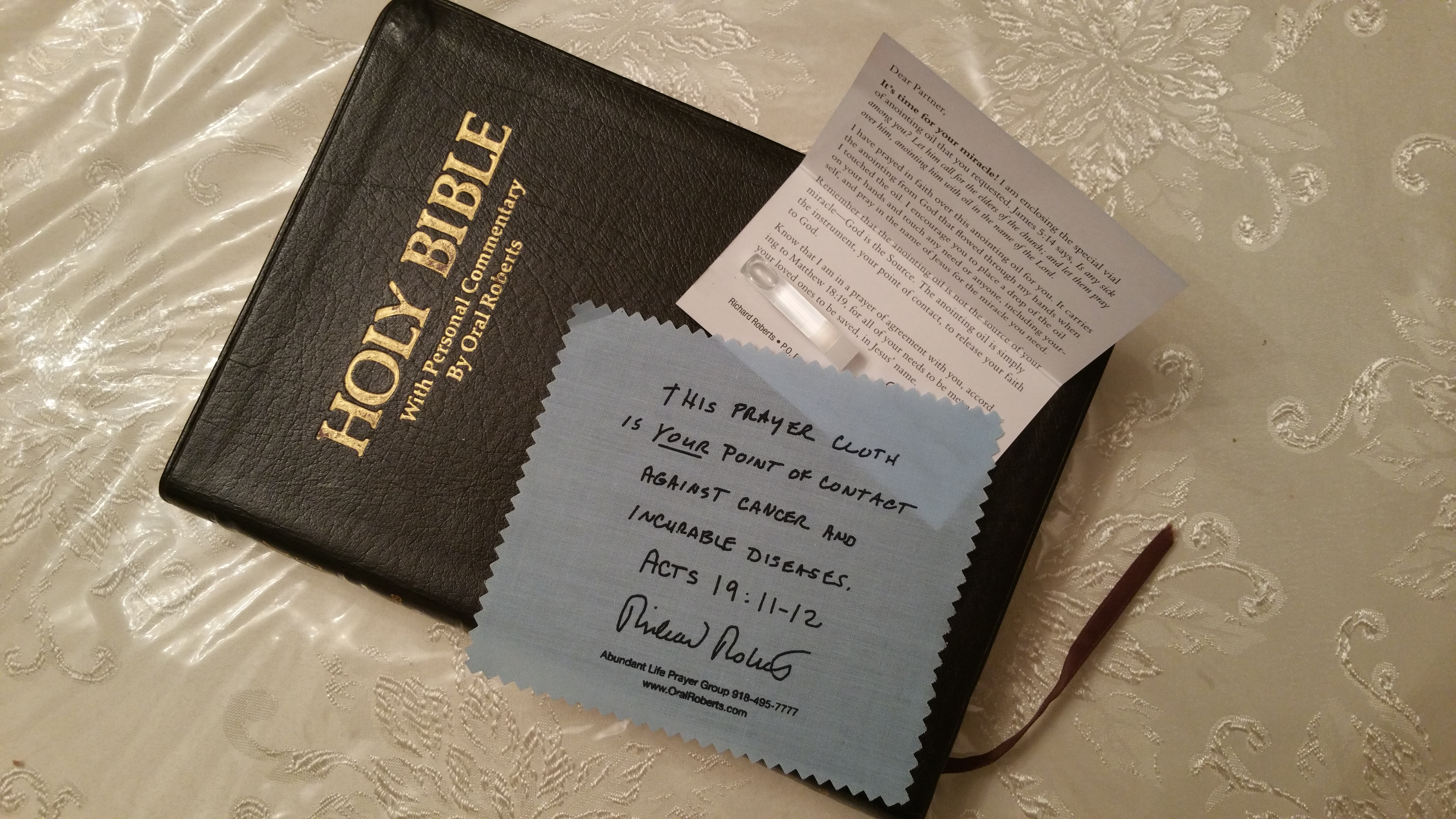
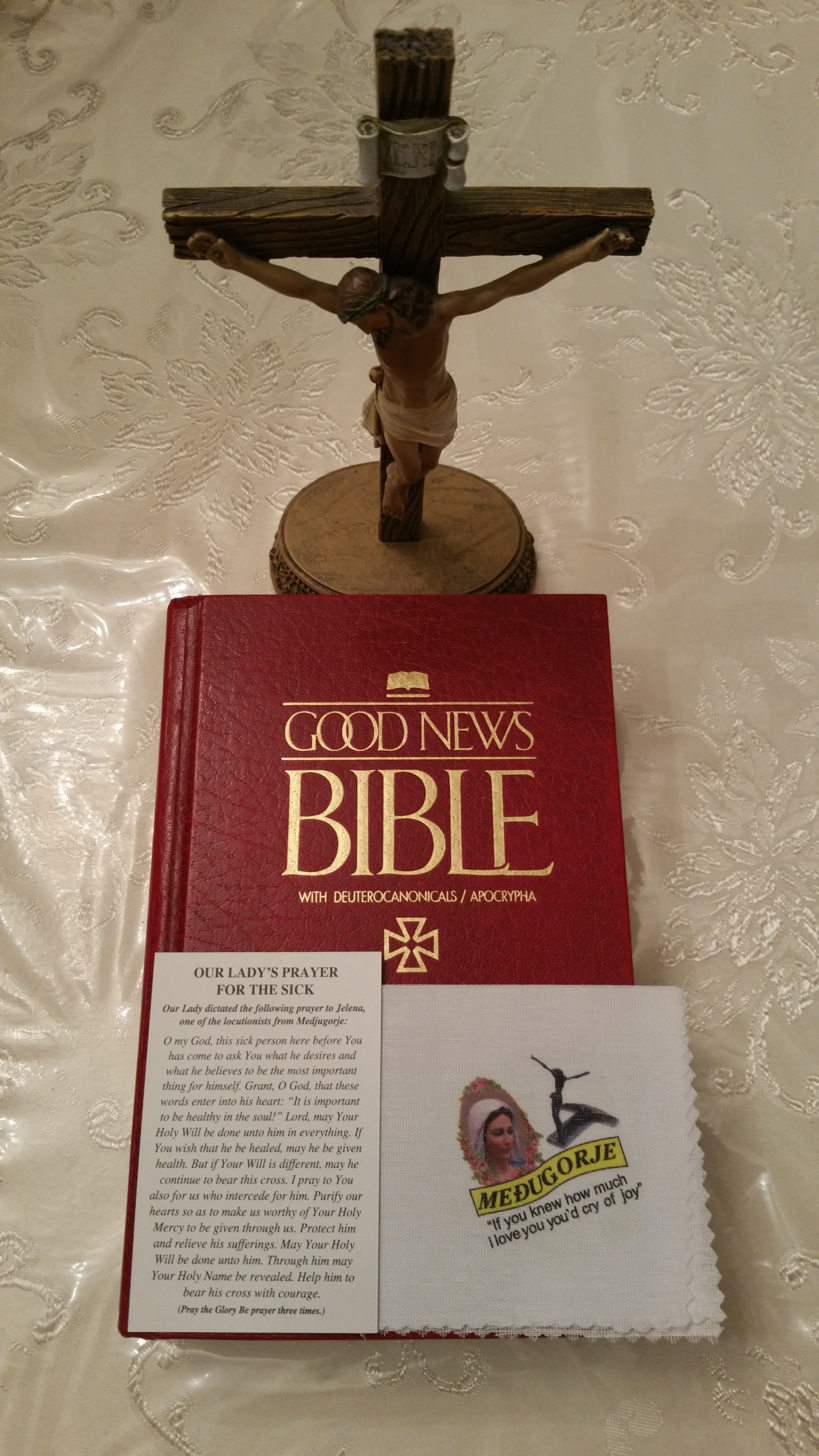
Two prayer cloths, one distributed by the Oral Roberts Evangelistic Association (top) and the other from the Shrine of Our Lady of Medjugorje (bottom)

A prayer cloth is a sacramental used by Christians, in continuation with the practice of the early Church, as recorded in the Acts of the Apostles:

God did extraordinary miracles through Paul, so that when the handkerchiefs or aprons that had touched his skin were brought to the sick, their diseases left them, and the evil spirits came out of them (Acts 19:11-12).

Prayer cloths are especially popular within the Catholic and Pentecostal traditions of Christianity, although communicants of other Christian denominations use them as well. Among Lebanese Christians, prayer cloths are blessed and then placed on an afflicted area, while believers pray to God through the intercession of Saint Sharbel. Among Methodists and Pentecostals, if a Christian is suffering from an illness and is not present during a church service, a prayer cloth is consecrated through prayer and then taken to the sick individual.

== See also ==
- Christian headcovering
- Cross necklace
- Tallit
