= Sankt Florian =

Sankt Florian St. Florian
- Municipality
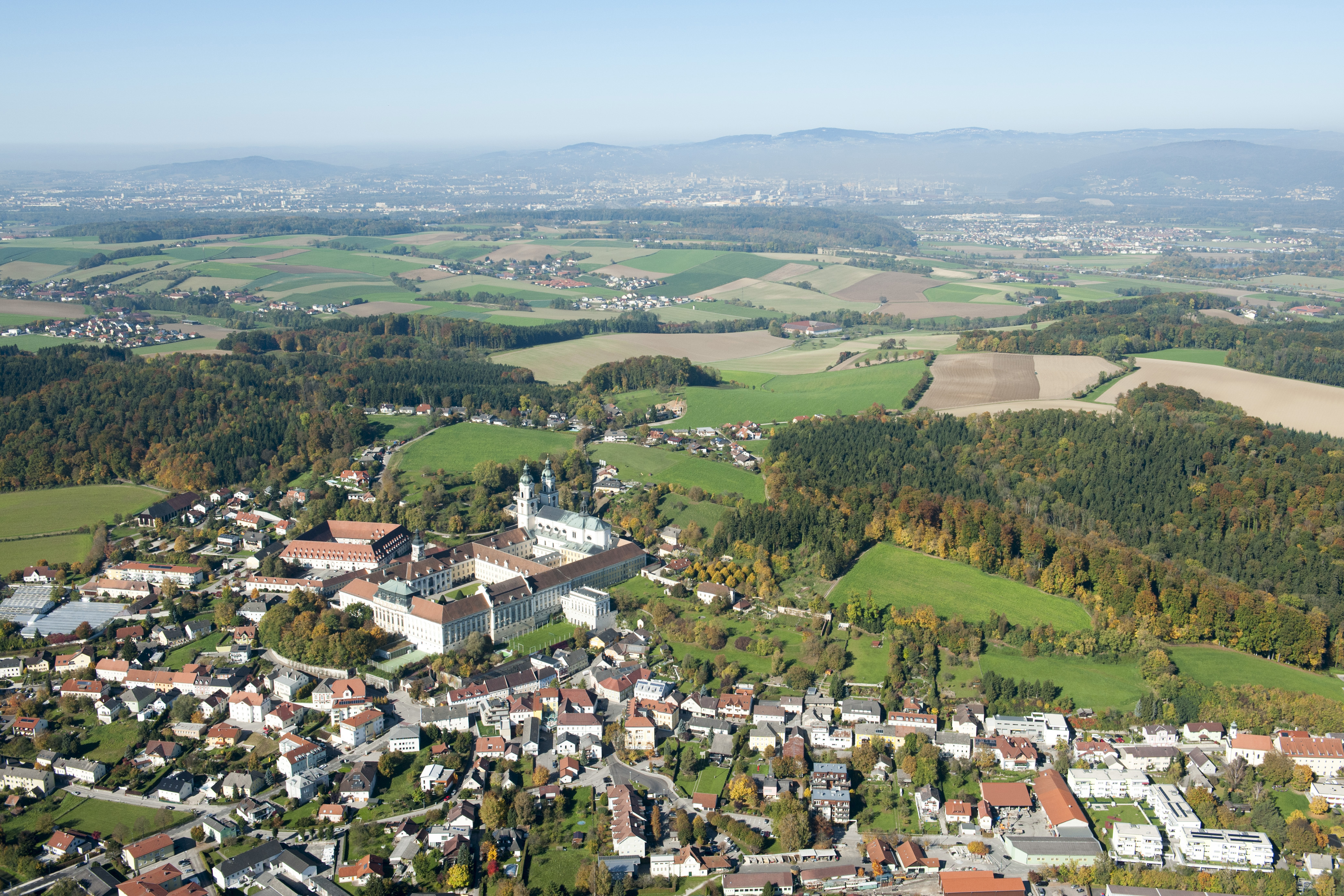

- Coat of arms

- Location within Austria
- Coordinates: 48°12′32″N 14°22′46″E
- Country: Austria
- State: Upper Austria
- District: Linz-Land

Government
  - Mayor: Robert Franz Zeitlinger (ÖVP)

Area
  - Total: 44.17 km^{2} (17.05 sq mi)
- Elevation: 296 m (971 ft)

Population (2018-01-01)
  - Total: 6,176
  - Density: 139.8/km^{2} (362.1/sq mi)
- Time zone: UTC+1 (CET)
  - Summer (DST): UTC+2 (CEST)
- Postal code: 4490
- Area code: 07224, 07223
- Vehicle registration: LL
- Website: Official website

Sankt Florian (also Florian or St. Florian) is a town in the Austrian state of Upper Austria. It is 10 miles (16 km) from Linz.

Sankt Florian is the home of St. Florian Monastery, a community of Canons Regular named after Saint Florian and one of the oldest operational monasteries in the world following the Rule of St. Augustine. Composer Anton Bruckner (1824–96), who was a choirboy and later organist in the town, is buried beneath the organ inside the monastic church, which was elevated to the rank of basilica minor in 1999.

== The St. Florianer Sängerknaben ==
The town is also known for its boys' choir (St. Florianer Sängerknaben), founded in 1071. The choir has been a traditional part of the monastery's worship from its beginning and has contributed significantly to the identity of the town. It has particular responsibility for sacred music for the religious community, but also undertakes successful international concert tours and television appearances.

=== Selected discography ===
- Franz Farnberger, Anton Bruckner in St Florian – Requiem & Motetten, St. Florianer Sängerknaben - CD: Studio SM D2639 SM 44, 1997 (with Bruckner's Magnificat & Psalm 22)
- Gunar Letzbor, Franz Joseph Aumann - Requiem, St. Florianer Sängerknaben, Ars Antiqua Austria - CD: Pan Classics PC 10234, 2008 (with Aumann's Ecce quomodo moritur justus, Tenebrae factae sunt and Te Deum)
- Gunar Letzbor, Joseph Balthasar Hochreither - Requiem; Missa Jubilus sacer. St. Florianer Sängerknaben, Ars Antiqua Austria - CD: Pan Classics PC 10264, 2014

== Museums ==
Sankt Florian has a firefighting museum (Historisches Feuerwehrzeughaus; situated in a part of the monastic buildings), a hunting museum (Jagdmuseum Schloss Hohenbrunn) and a museum of farming and local history (Sumerauerhof).

== Population ==
Historical population
Year	Pop.	±%
1869	3,631	—
1880	3,804	+4.8%
1890	3,700	−2.7%
1900	3,722	+0.6%
1910	3,714	−0.2%
1923	3,583	−3.5%
1934	3,613	+0.8%
1951	4,266	+18.1%
1961	3,709	−13.1%
1971	3,843	+3.6%
1981	4,129	+7.4%
1991	5,116	+23.9%
2001	5,530	+8.1%
2011	5,976	+8.1%
