= Das edle Herz, WAB 65 =

1851 song composed by Anton Bruckner

Das edle Herz
- Secular choral work by Anton Bruckner
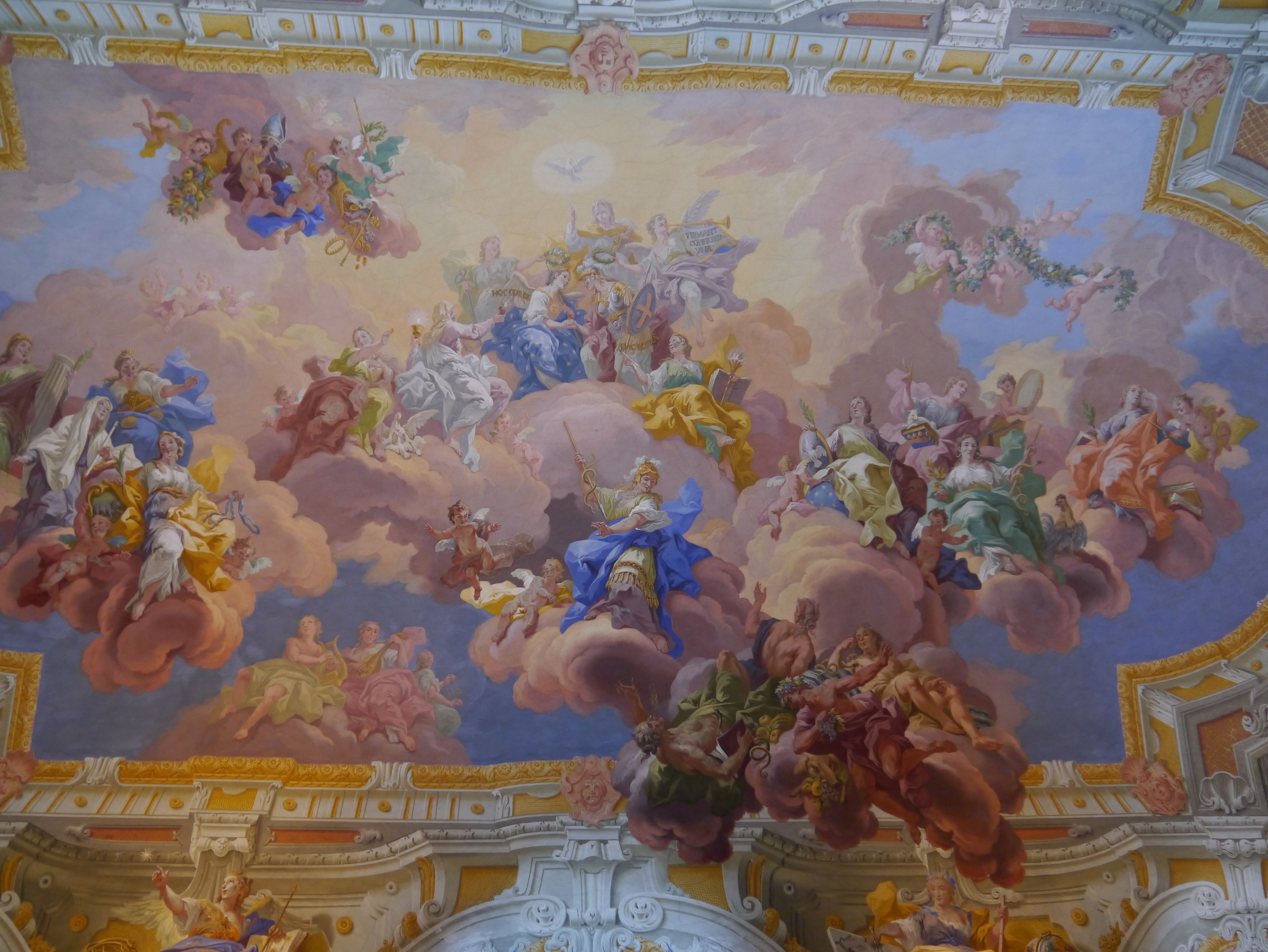
- Ceiling of the library of the St. Florian Abbey
- Key: A major
- Catalogue: WAB 65
- Text: Ernst Marinelli
- Language: German
- Composed: c. 1851: St. Florian
- Dedication: Name day of Johann Nepomuk Paulitsch
- Published: 1932: Regensburg
- Vocal: TTBB choir

Das edle Herz ("The noble heart"), WAB 65, is a song composed by Anton Bruckner in c. 1851 during his stay in St. Florian.

== History ==
Bruckner composed this work on a text of Ernst Marinelli in c. 1851 during his stay in St. Florian. He composed it for the name day of Johann Nepomuk Paulitsch, a member of the St. Florian choir. It is not known whether the work was performed during Bruckner's life.

The original manuscript, which became in-between lost, was found in the legacy of Bruckner's friend Rudolf Weinwurm. A sketch of it is archived at the Abbey of St. Florian. It was performed in 1988 by the Wagner Society Male Choir, Keio University, Tokyo, and, thereafter, in 1994 in the Connecticut College.

The work, which was first issued in Band II/2, pp. 111–113, of the Göllerich/Auer biography, is issued in Band XXIII/2, No. 7 of the Gesamtausgabe.

Bruckner composed a second setting on the same text for mixed choir (WAB 66) in 1857.

== Text ==
Das edle Herz uses a text by Ernst Marinelli.

Wer im Busen nicht die Flamme
Nur des eigenen Altars nährt,
Wer den Blick der edlen Liebe
Freudig zu dem Bruder kehrt,

Wer sich nicht sich selbst geboren,
Sondern seinem Schöpfer glaubt,
Diesen Glauben nie verloren,
Andern selben nie geraubt,

Wer den Wert der eignen Habe
Gern in dürft’ge Hände legt,
Seines Wissens hehre Gabe
Auch in fremde Herzen trägt,

Wer im Segnen und Beglücken
Seines Lebens Freude weiß,
Dem erschallet mit Entzücken
Dankerfüllter Seelenpreis.

Whoever feeds in his chest not only the flame
Of his own altar,
Whoever turns his glance of noble love
Happily to his brother,

Whoever does not believe to be born by himself,
But believes in his Creator,
Who never lost this creed,
Who never robbed others of it,

Whoever lays the value of his own belongings
Willingly in needy hands,
Who passes the noble gift of his knowledge
Also in the heart of others,

Whoever is aware that blessing and giving
mean the joy of his life,
To him sounds with bliss
Thankful praise from the soul.

== Music ==
The 46-bar long work in 9/8 is scored in A major for TTBB choir. From bar 34, the score goes over in 4/4 in chorale form on "dankerfüllter Seelenpreis" until the end of the song.

== Discography ==
There is as yet no commercial recording of this first setting of Das edle Herz.

== Sources ==
- August Göllerich, Anton Bruckner. Ein Lebens- und Schaffens-Bild, c. 1922 – posthumous edited by Max Auer by G. Bosse, Regensburg, 1932
- Anton Bruckner – Sämtliche Werke, Band XXIII/2: Weltliche Chorwerke (1843–1893), Musikwissenschaftlicher Verlag der Internationalen Bruckner-Gesellschaft, Angela Pachovsky and Anton Reinthaler (Editor), Vienna, 1989
- Cornelis van Zwol, Anton Bruckner 1824–1896 – Leven en werken, uitg. Thoth, Bussum, Netherlands, 2012. ISBN 978-90-6868-590-9
- Uwe Harten, Anton Bruckner. Ein Handbuch. Residenz Verlag, Salzburg, 1996. ISBN 3-7017-1030-9.
