= List of lieder by Anton Bruckner =

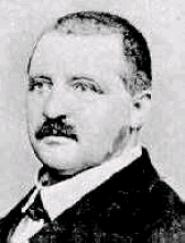
Anton Bruckner, c. 1860

Anton Bruckner composed about 20 lieder during his life, the earliest in c. 1845, the last in 1882. Most of the lieder were composed during his stay in the St. Florian Abbey (1845–1855) and his tuition by Otto Kitzler (1861–1862).

== St. Florian and early Linz period ==
During his stay in St. Florian and in Linz before Kitzler's tuition, Bruckner made sketches for two lieder and composed three lieder.

During the beginning of his stay in St. Florian, Bruckner made sketches for two lieder:

- Mild wie die Bäche (So gentle as the creeks), WAB 138, a 31-bar sketch made in c. 1845 for a lied in A♭ major on a text of Ernst Marinelli. The manuscript, in which the piano accompaniment is incomplete, is stored in the archive of the St. Florian Abbey. This Liedentwurf, of which a facsimile was first published in Band II/2, pp. 59–60, of the Göllerich/Auer biography, is edited in Band XXIII/1, Liedentwürfe, of the Bruckner's Gesamtausgabe.
- Wie des Bächleins Silberquelle (As the creek's silvery source), WAB 84.1, a 60-bar sketch made in c. 1845 for a duet for two sopranos in G major on the same text as Ständchen, WAB 84.2 (Sämtliche Werke, Band XXIII/2, No. 3). The first part (bars 1-56) of the manuscript with incomplete piano accompaniment is stored in the archive of the St. Florian Abbey, the remaining with bars 57-60 is found in the city museum of Wels. This Liedentwurf, of which a facsimile of the first part was first published in Band II/2, pp. 65–66, of the Göllerich/Auer biography, is edited in Band XXIII/1, Liedentwürfe, of the Bruckner's Gesamtausgabe.

Thereafter, Bruckner composed three lieder:

- Der Mondabend (The moonlit evening), WAB 200, a 12-bar lied in A major composed in c. 1850 for Aloisia Bogner on a text by Johann Gottfried Kumpf. The lied is part of the workbook "Lieder für eine Singstimme mit Clavier-Begleitung für Fräulein Louise Bogner", which has been retrieved in the Landesmuseum of Upper Austria. The workbook has been issued in 2015 by the Anton Bruckner Institut Linz.
- Frühlingslied (Spring song), WAB 68, a 24-bar lied in A major, composed in 1851 for the name-day of Aloisia Bogner on a text by Heinrich Heine. The lied is edited in Band XXIII/1, No. 1, of the Bruckner's Gesamtausgabe.
- Wie bist du, Frühling, gut und treu (Springtime, how good and faithful you are), WAB 58, a 102-bar lied in G major composed in 1856 on five strophes of Oskar von Redwitz' Amaranths Waldeslieder. The lied is edited in Band XXIII/1, No. 2, of the Bruckner's Gesamtausgabe.

== During Kitzler's tuition ==
The lieder and sketches, which Bruckner composed in 1861–1862 as exercises during Kitzler's tuition, are found in the Kitzler-Studienbuch:

- O habt die Thräne gern (1st setting), WAB 205, a 16-bar lied in A minor: Kitzler-Studienbuch, pp. 18–19
- Nachglück (1st setting), WAB 204, a 16-bar lied in C major: Kitzler-Studienbuch, p. 19
- Herzeleid, WAB add 232, a 16-bar sketch for a lied in E minor: Kitzler-Studienbuch, p. 20
- Nachglück (2nd setting), WAB add 235, a 16-bar sketch for a lied in F major: Kitzler-Studienbuch, p. 21
- Von der schlummernden Mutter, WAB 206, a 20-bar lied in F major: Kitzler-Studienbuch, p. 22
- Des Baches Frühlingsfeier, WAB 202, a 22-bar lied in D minor: Kitzler-Studienbuch, p. 23
- Wie neid ich Dich, du stolzer Wald, WAB 207, a 24-bar lied in E♭ major: Kitzler-Studienbuch, p. 24
- O habt die Thräne gern (2nd setting), WAB add 236, a 32-bar sketch for a lied in A minor: Kitzler-Studienbuch, p. 42
- Last des Herzens, WAB add 234, a 32-bar sketch for a lied in E♭ major: Kitzler-Studienbuch, p. 43
- Es regnet, WAB add 231, a 24-bar sketch for a lied in E minor: Kitzler-Studienbuch, pp. 46–47
- Wunsch, WAB add 238, a 32-bar sketch for a lied: Kitzler-Studienbuch, pp. 47–48
- Der Trompeter an der Katzbach, WAB 201, a 90-bar lied in F minor on a text by Julius Mosen: Kitzler-Studienbuch, pp. 207–213

== After Kitzler's tuition ==
After the end of Kitzler's tuition, during his later stay in Linz and in Vienna, Bruckner composed four other lieder:

- Herbstkummer (Autumnal sorrow), WAB 72, a 62-bar lied in E minor composed in April 1864 on a text by "Ernst".
- Im April (In April), WAB 75, a 73-bar lied in A♭ major composed in c. 1865 on a text by Emanuel Geibel.
- Mein Herz und deine Stimme (My heart and your voice), WAB 79, a 60-bar lied in A major composed in 1868 on a text by August von Platen.
- Volkslied (National hymn), WAB 94, a 34-bar composition in C major composed in 1882 on a text by Josef Winter. Bruckner composed it, as well as a second setting for men's choir (Sämtliche Werke, Band XXIII/2, No. 32), for a competition für eines sangbares Nationallied (for a singable National hymn).

These lieder are edited in Band XXIII/1, Nos. 3 to 6, of the Gesamtausgabe:

== Discography ==
Six commercial recordings contain Bruckner's lieder:

- Marie Luise Bart-Larsson (soprano), Gernot Martzy (piano), Kammermusikalische Kostbarkeiten von Anton Bruckner – CD Weinberg Records SW 01 036–2, 1996: Herbstkummer and Mein Herz und deine Stimme
- Robert Holzer (bass), Thomas Kerbl (piano), Anton Bruckner - Lieder/Magnificat – CD LIVA 046, 2011: the lieder issued in Band XXIII/1 of the Gesamtausgabe, except the Volkslied. Reissued as Anton Bruckner - Lieder, Chöre, Magnificat – CD Gramola 99071, 2015, with, in addition, the in the meantime retrieved Der Mondabend. NB: The lieder are transposed to match Holzer's tessitura. Four of these lieder can also be heard on YouTube: Frühlingslied, Wie bist du, Frühling, gut und treu, Mein Herz und deine Stimme and Im April
- Ulf Bästlein (baritone), Sascha El Mouissi (piano), Ich blick’ in mein Herz und ich blick' in die Welt - CD Gramola 99136, 2017: Im April
- Elisabeth Wimmer (soprano), Daniel Linton-France (piano):
  - Böck liest Bruckner I (3 October 2018) – CD Gramola 99195, 2019: Frühlingslied, Amaranths Waldeslieder and Mein Herz und deine Stimme. NB: In addition, Bruckner's Der Mondabend is compared with Schubert's Der Mondabend, D.141.
  - Böck liest Bruckner II (5 October 2019) – CD Gramola 99237, 2020: Herbstkummer, Im April, and two lieder from the Kitzler Study Book: O habt die Thräne gern, WAB 205 and Vor der schlummernden Mutter, WAB 206
- Günther Groissböck (bass), Malcolm Martineau (piano) - Männerliebe und Leben – CD Gramola 99294, 2024: Herbstkummer, WAB 72, Im April, WAB 75 and Mein Herz und deine Stimme, WAB 79

== Sources ==
- August Göllerich, Anton Bruckner. Ein Lebens- und Schaffens-Bild, c. 1922 – posthumous edited by Max Auer by G. Bosse, Regensburg, 1932
- Anton Bruckner – Sämtliche Werke, Band XXIII/1: Lieder für Gesang und Klavier (1851–1882), Musikwissenschaftlicher Verlag der Internationalen Bruckner-Gesellschaft, Angela Pachovsky (Editor), Vienna, 1997
- Anton Bruckner - Sämtliche Werke, Band XXV: Das Kitzler Studienbuch (1861-1863), facsimile, Musikwissenschaftlicher Verlag der Internationalen Bruckner-Gesellschaft, Paul Hawkshaw and Erich Wolfgang Partsch (Editors), Vienna, 2015
- Lieder für Luise Bogner, eine Volksliedersammlung Anton Bruckners, Oberösterreichische Schriften zur Volksmusik, Band 16, Klaus Petermayr (Ed.), Anton Bruckner Institut Linz, 2015
- Cornelis van Zwol, Anton Bruckner 1824–1896 – Leven en werken, uitg. Thoth, Bussum, Netherlands, 2012. ISBN 978-90-6868-590-9
- Uwe Harten, Anton Bruckner. Ein Handbuch. Residenz Verlag, Salzburg, 1996. ISBN 3-7017-1030-9.
- Crawford Howie, Anton Bruckner - A documentary biography, online revised edition
