= Frühlingslied, WAB 68 =

1851 lied composed by Anton Bruckner

Frühlingslied
- Lied by Anton Bruckner
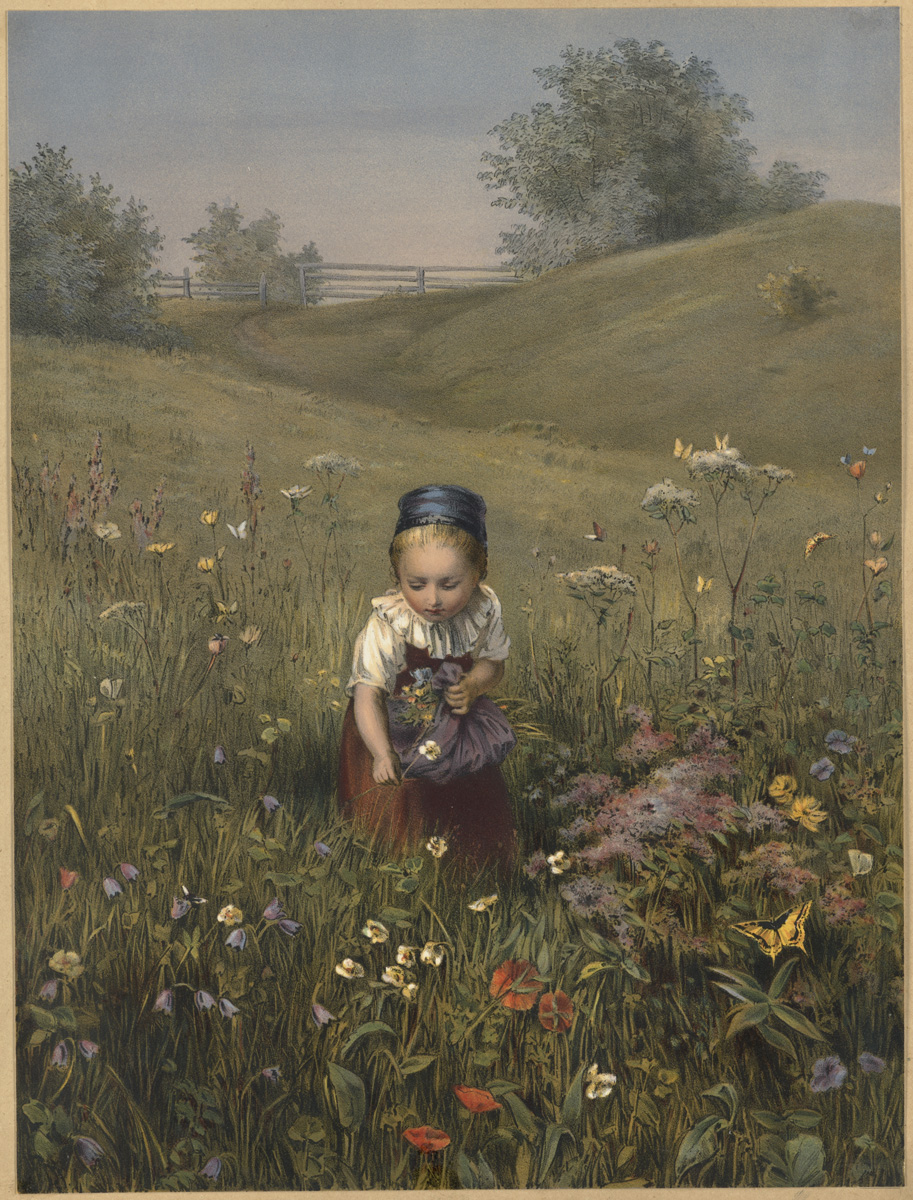
- Spring Flowers by Ludwig Knaus
- Key: A major
- Catalogue: WAB 68
- Text: Heinrich Heine
- Language: German
- Composed: 1851: St. Florian
- Dedication: Name-day of Aloisia Bogner
- Vocal: Solo voice
- Instrumental: Piano

Frühlingslied ("Spring song"), WAB 68, is a lied composed by Anton Bruckner in 1851 for the name-day of Aloisia Bogner.

== History ==
Bruckner composed the lied on a text of Heinrich Heine in 1851 for "the name-day of a blossoming spring rose" (dem Nahmensfeste einer auflblühenden Frühlingsrose), Bruckner's 16-year old pupil Aloisia Bogner, for whom he also composed Der Mondabend and the piano works Lancier-Quadrille, WAB 120, and Steiermärker, WAB 122.

The manuscript is stored in the archive of the Oberösterreichisches Landmuseum of Linz. The lied, which was first published in Band II/2, pp. 44–46 of the Göllerich/Auer biography, is issued in Band XXIII/1, No. 1 of the Gesamtausgabe.

== Text ==
Frühlingslied is based on a text by Heinrich Heine, with one minor change:

Leise zieht durch mein Gemüt
Liebliches Geläute.
Klinge, kleine Frühlingslied,
Kling hinaus ins Weite.

Kling hinaus bis an sein Haus,
Wo die Blumen sprießen,
Wenn du eine Rose schaust,
Sag, ich lass' dich grüßen.

Lovely chimes draw softly
Into my soul.
Ring, little spring song,
Ring out far away.

Ring out to his house,
Where the flowers sprout,
When you see a rose,
Say: "I let greet you".

== Music ==
The 24-bar long work in A major is scored for solo voice and piano. This easy composition displays no relationship with Mendelssohn's Frühlingslied. The voice score is conducted cantabile, and the piano accompaniment uses a continuous figuration.

== Discography ==
There are two recordings of Frühlingslied:

- Robert Holzer (bass), Thomas Kerbl (piano), Anton Bruckner Lieder/Magnificat – CD: LIVA 046, 2011. NB: Transposed in F major.
- Elisabeth Wimmer (soprano), Daniel Linton-France (piano) in "Bruckner, Anton – Böck liest Bruckner I" – CD – Gramola 99195, 3 October 2018

== Sources ==
- August Göllerich, Anton Bruckner. Ein Lebens- und Schaffens-Bild, c. 1922 – posthumous edited by Max Auer by G. Bosse, Regensburg, 1932
- Anton Bruckner – Sämtliche Werke, Band XXIII/1: Lieder für Gesang und Klavier (1851–1882), Musikwissenschaftlicher Verlag der Internationalen Bruckner-Gesellschaft, Angela Pachovsky (Editor), Vienna, 1997
- Cornelis van Zwol, Anton Bruckner 1824–1896 – Leven en werken, uitg. Thoth, Bussum, Netherlands, 2012. ISBN 978-90-6868-590-9
- Uwe Harten, Anton Bruckner. Ein Handbuch. Residenz Verlag, Salzburg, 1996. ISBN 3-7017-1030-9.
- Crawford Howie, Anton Bruckner - A documentary biography, online revised edition
