= Das edle Herz, WAB 66 =

1857 song composed by Anton Bruckner

Das edle Herz
- Secular choral work by Anton Bruckner
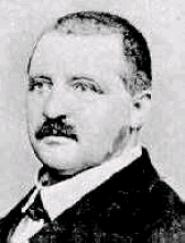
- Bruckner, c. 1860
- Key: A major
- Catalogue: WAB 66
- Text: Ernst Marinelli
- Language: German
- Composed: December 1857: Linz
- Published: 1932: Regensburg
- Vocal: SATB choir

Das edle Herz ("The noble heart"), WAB 66, is a song composed by Anton Bruckner in December 1857 during his stay in Linz. In St. Florian, Bruckner had already composed a first setting of the song for men's choir, WAB 65.

== History ==
Bruckner composed the second setting of the work on the same text of Ernst Marinelli in December 1857 during his stay in Linz. It is not known whether the work, which was composed possibly on request of Liedertafel Frohsinn for a performance as mixed choir, was performed during Bruckner's life.

The original manuscript of the work is lost. A sketch of the work is stored in the archive of Enns. The work, of which a copy was issued in Band III/2, pp. 13-17, of the Göllerich/Auer biography, is issued in Band XXIII/2, No. 12 of the Gesamtausgabe.

== Music ==
The second stetting of Das edle Herz is in the same key and is 8-bars shorter than the first setting of the song. The 38-bar long work in 4/4 is scored in A major for SATB choir. The score ends with a 4-bar, instead of 13-bar, chorale.

== Discography ==
There is a single commercial recording of this second setting of Das edle Herz:

- Calmus Ensemble, Bruckner Vocal - Das edle Herz, WAB 66 – Carus, 2023

Note: A performance by Stephen Cleobury with the BBC Choir (2011) is put in the Bruckner Archive: Charter Oak COR-2178 (box of 2 CDs).

== Sources ==
- August Göllerich, Anton Bruckner. Ein Lebens- und Schaffens-Bild, c. 1922 – posthumous edited by Max Auer by G. Bosse, Regensburg, 1932
- Anton Bruckner – Sämtliche Werke, Band XXIII/2: Weltliche Chorwerke (1843–1893), Musikwissenschaftlicher Verlag der Internationalen Bruckner-Gesellschaft, Angela Pachovsky and Anton Reinthaler (Editor), Vienna, 1989
- Cornelis van Zwol, Anton Bruckner 1824–1896 – Leven en werken, uitg. Thoth, Bussum, Netherlands, 2012. ISBN 978-90-6868-590-9
- Uwe Harten, Anton Bruckner. Ein Handbuch. Residenz Verlag, Salzburg, 1996. ISBN 3-7017-1030-9.
- Crawford Howie, Anton Bruckner - A documentary biography, online revised edition
