= Im April, WAB 75 =

Im April
- Lied by Anton Bruckner
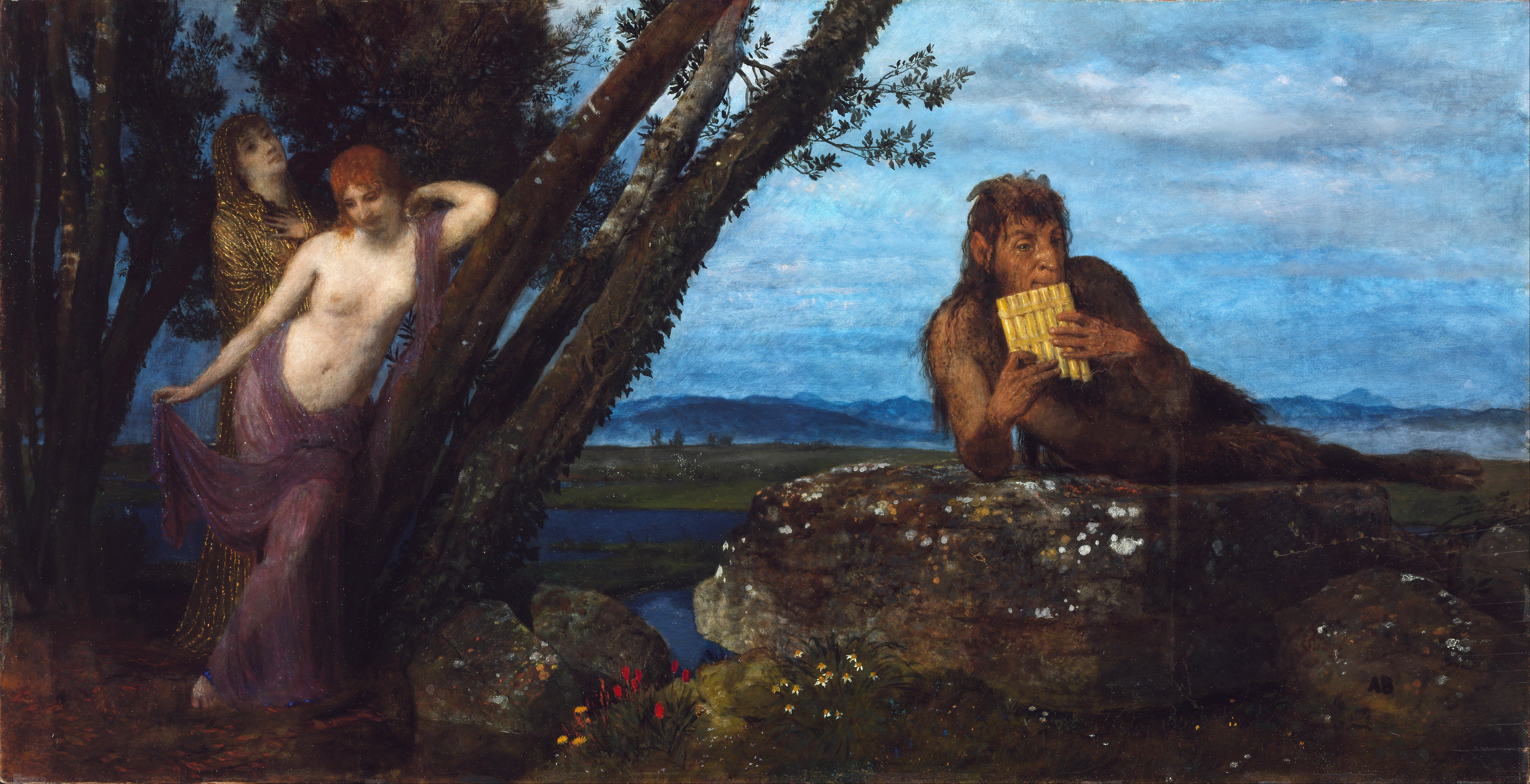
- Spring Evening by Arnold Böcklin
- Key: A-flat major
- Catalogue: WAB 75
- Text: Emanuel Geibel
- Language: German
- Composed: c. 1865: Linz
- Dedication: Helene Hofmann
- Performed: 5 February 1903: Vienna
- Vocal: Solo voice
- Instrumental: Piano

Im April ("In April"), WAB 75 is a lied composed by Anton Bruckner in c. 1865.

== History ==
Bruckner composed the lied on a text by Emanuel Geibel during his stay in Linz. He dedicated the lied to his pupil Helene Hofmann, Pauline Hofmann's younger sister.

The date of composition is uncertain. It was originally supposed that the lied was composed in 1868. Because it was dedicated to "Helene Hofmann", Angela Pachovsky put the date "before 18 September 1865" instead, i.e., before Helene's wedding with Heinrich Heissler.

The manuscript is lost, but a copy is stored in the archive of the St. Florian Abbey. In 1898 the work was issued by Bernhard Herzmansky by Doblinger. The first performance occurred on 5 February 1903 by Gisela Seehofer in a concert of the Wiener Akademischer Wagner-Verein, during which Seehofer also sang Bruckner's Ave Maria, WAB 7 and Wie bist du, Frühling, gut und treu.

The song is issued in Band XXIII/1, No. 5 of the Gesamtausgabe.

== Text ==
The song uses a text by Emanuel Geibel.

Du feuchter Frühlingsabend,
Wie hab' ich dich so gern,
Der Himmel wolkenbehangen,
Nur hie und da ein Stern.

Wie leiser Himmelsodem
Hauchet so laut die Luft,
Es steigt aus allen Tälern,
Ein warmer Veilchenduft.

Ich möcht' ein Lied ersinnen,
Das diesem Abend gleich,
Und kann den Klang nicht finden
So dunkel, mild und weich.

You, damp spring evening,
How much I love you,
The sky full of clouds,
With only a star here and there.

As a gentle ethereal breath,
The air hums so intensely,
From all the valleys rises
A warm fragrance of violets.

I would like to conceive a song
Similar to this evening,
But I can not find the sound,
So dark, mild and mellow.

== Music ==
The 60-bar long work in A major is scored for solo voice and piano.

== Discography ==
There are four recordings of Im April:

- Robert Holzer (bass), Thomas Kerbl (piano), Anton Bruckner Lieder/Magnificat – CD: LIVA 046, 2011. NB: Transposed in G major.
- Ulf Bästlein (baritone), Sascha El Mouissi (piano), Ich blick’ in mein Herz und ich blick' in die Welt - CD Gramola 99136, 2017
- Elisabeth Wimmer (soprano), Daniel Linton-France (piano) in: Bruckner, Anton – Böck liest Bruckner II – CD Gramola 99237, 2020
- Erinnerung - Bruckner in St. Florian, Alois Mühlbacher (countertenor), Franz Farnberger (grand piano) – CD: Solo Musica SM 450, 2024
- Günther Groissböck (bass), Malcolm Martineau (piano) - Männerliebe und Leben – CD Gramola 99294, 2024

== Sources ==
- Anton Bruckner – Sämtliche Werke, Band XXIII/1: Songs for voice and piano (1851–1882), Musikwissenschaftlicher Verlag der Internationalen Bruckner-Gesellschaft, Angela Pachovsky (Editor), Vienna, 1997
- Cornelis van Zwol, Anton Bruckner 1824–1896 – Leven en werken, uitg. Thoth, Bussum, Netherlands, 2012. ISBN 978-90-6868-590-9
- Uwe Harten, Anton Bruckner. Ein Handbuch. Residenz Verlag, Salzburg, 1996. ISBN 3-7017-1030-9.
- Crawford Howie, Anton Bruckner - A documentary biography, online revised edition
