= Psalm 22 (Bruckner) =

- by Anton Bruckner
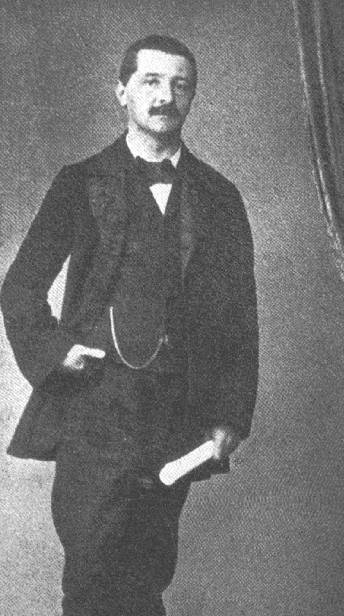
- The young Bruckner
- Key: E♭ major
- Catalogue: WAB 34
- Form: Psalm setting
- Composed: c. 1852: St. Florian
- Recorded: 1997
- Movements: 3
- Vocal: SATB choir and soloists
- Instrumental: Piano

Bruckner's Psalm 22, WAB 34, is a setting of a German version of Psalm 23, which was psalm 22 in the Vulgata.

== History ==
Amongst the five psalm settings composed by Bruckner, Psalm 22 is the only one with piano accompaniment. The work was composed in circa 1852 in St. Florian, but it is unknown when it was performed at that time.

The manuscript is stored in the archive of the St. Florian monastery. The first known performance occurred on 11 October 1921 in St. Florian by Franz Xaver Müller. It was first published in Band II/2, pp. 119–130 of the Göllerich/Auer biography. It was edited by Paul Hawkshaw in 1997 in Band XX/2 of the Gesamtausgabe.

== Text ==
Der Herr ist Hirt und Versorger (The Lord is shepherd and caregiver)

1. [Ein Psalm Davids.] Der Herr regieret mich, und nichts wird mir mangeln:
2. Auf einem Weideplatze, da hat er mich gelagert: am Wasser der Erquickung mich erzogen:
3. Meine Seele bekehret: mich geführt auf die Wege der Gerechtigkeit, um seines Namens willen.
4. Denn wenn ich auch wandle mitten im Todesschatten, so will ich nichts Übels fürchten, weil du bei mir bist. Deine Ruthe und dein Stab, die haben mich getröstet.
5. Du hast einen Tisch vor meinem Angesichte bereitet wider die, so mich quälen. Du hast gesalbet mit Öl mein Haupt: und mein berauschender Becher wie herrlich ist er!
6. Und deine Barmherzigkeit folget mir all' die Tage meines Lebens:
7. Daß ich wohne im Hause des Herrn auf lange Zeit.

== Setting ==
The 131-bar work in E♭ major is scored for SATB choir and soloists, and piano.

The setting of the first part is in general homophone, with a few imitations on "So will ich nichts Übles fürchten", "Du has bereitet einen Tisch", "wie herrlich ist er!" and "Und deine Barmherzigkeit". As in Bruckner's contemporaneous Magnificat the verses are sung as an Arioso alternatingly by the choir and the soloists. From bar 43 onwards, the last verse is sung by the choir as a fugue, which evolves, on bar 115, in an ending a cappella Chorale.

== Discography ==
There are three recordings of this work:

- Franz Farnberger, Anton Bruckner in St. Florian – Requiem & Motetten, St. Florianer Sängerknaben, Studio SM D2639 SM 44, 1997.
  This performance, which was recorded in the St. Florian Abbey, provides the listener with a whiff of authenticity.
- Thomas Kerbl, Anton Bruckner – Chöre & Klaviermusik, Chorvereinigung Bruckner 09 and Kammerchor der Anton Bruckner Privatuniversität Linz, CD Bruckner Haus LIVA 034, 2009
- Calmus Ensemble, Bruckner Vocal - Psalm 22, WAB 34 – Carus, 2023
- Markus Stumpner, Erinnerung - Bruckner in St. Florian, St. Florianer Sängerknaben, Solo Musica SM 450, 2024

== Sources ==
- August Göllerich, Anton Bruckner. Ein Lebens- und Schaffens-Bild, c. 1922 – posthumous edited by Max Auer by G. Bosse, Regensburg, 1932
- Cornelis van Zwol, Anton Bruckner - Leven en Werken, Thot, Bussum (Netherlands), 2012. ISBN 90-686-8590-2
- John Williamson, The Cambridge Companion to Bruckner, Cambridge University Press, 2004. ISBN 0-521-80404-3
- Uwe Harten, Anton Bruckner. Ein Handbuch. Residenz Verlag, Salzburg, 1996. ISBN 3-7017-1030-9.
- Anton Bruckner – Sämtliche Werke, Band XX/2: Psalm 22 (1852), Musikwissenschaftlicher Verlag der Internationalen Bruckner-Gesellschaft, Paul Hawkshaw (Editor), Vienna, 1997
