= Der Mondabend (Bruckner) =

Song composed by Anton Bruckner

- Lied by Anton Bruckner
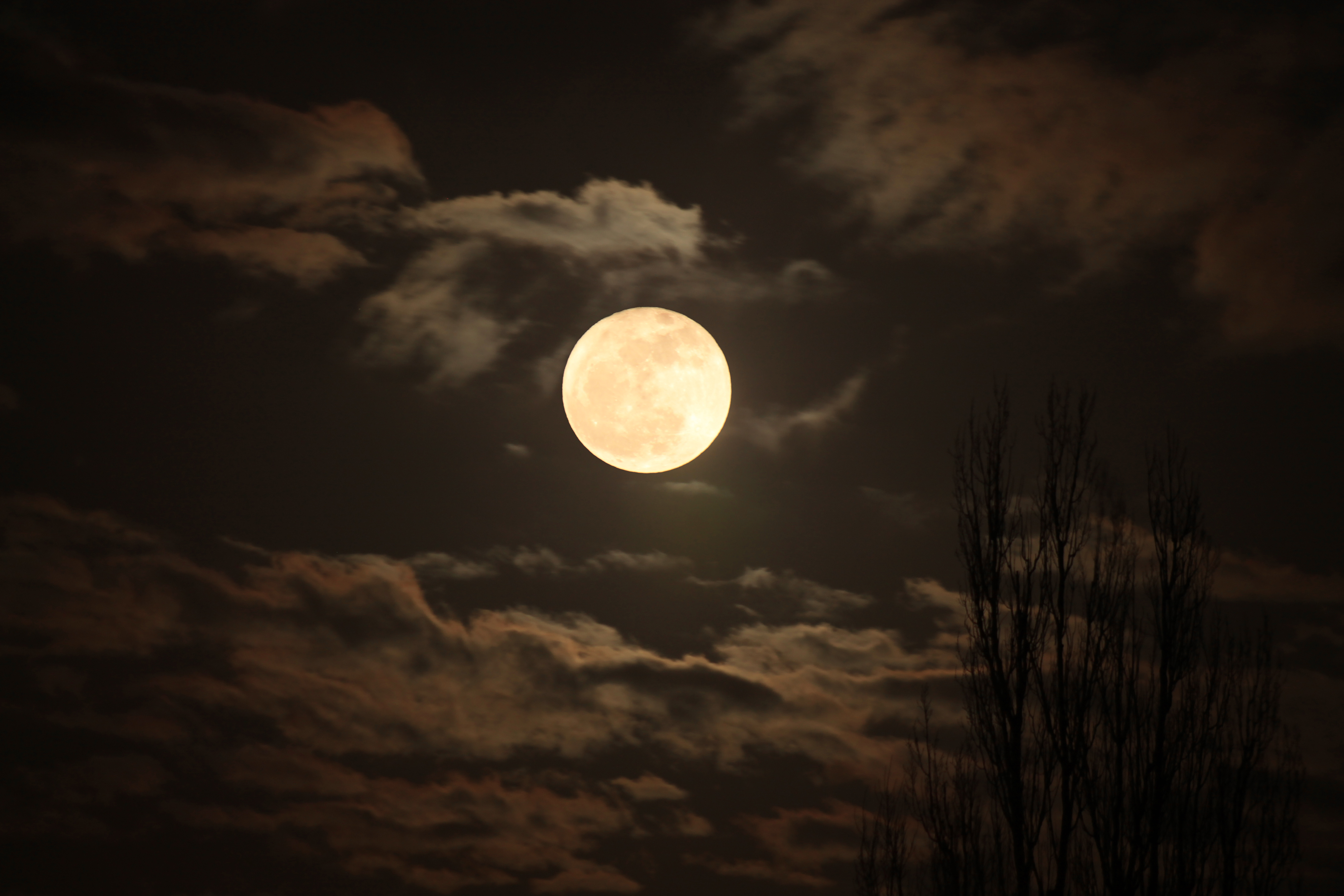
- Key: A major
- Catalogue: WAB 200
- Text: Johann Gottfried Kumpf
- Language: German
- Composed: c. 1850: St. Florian
- Dedication: Aloisia Bogner
- Published: 2015: Linz
- Vocal: Solo voice
- Instrumental: Piano

"Der Mondabend" ("The moonlit evening"), WAB 200, is a lied composed by Anton Bruckner in c. 1850 for Aloisia Bogner.

== History ==
Der Mondabend, WAB 200, is a lied in A major which Bruckner composed during his stay in St. Florian for his piano pupil Aloisia Bogner in c. 1850. The 16-year old Aloisia Bogner, alias Louise or Luise Bogner, was the older daughter of Michael Bogner, by whom Bruckner had his living accommodation. Bruckner composed for her also the Frühlingslied and the piano works Lancier-Quadrille, WAB 120, and Steiermärker, WAB 122.

The manuscript of the lied is part of the workbook Lieder für eine Singstimme mit Clavier-Begleitung für Fräulein Louise Bogner, which also contains transcriptions of Friedrich Silcher's Ännchen von Tharau, Lebe wohl, geliebtes Wesen from Anton Emil Titl's opera Der Zauberschleier, and Franz Wilhelm Abt's waltz Juheisa juhei, ihr Tänzer herbei.

The workbook, which was in the legacy of Aloisia Bogner, was acquired in 1957 by the Oberösterreichische Landesmuseen in Upper Austria. A facsimile of the workbook has been issued in the Oberösterreichische Schriften zur Volksmusik in 2015.

The premiere recording of the lied is by Robert Holzer on 23 June 2015.

== Text ==
Bruckner's song is based on the poem Der Mondabend by Johann Gottfried Kumpf:

Rein und freundlich lacht der Himmel nieder auf die dunkle Erde,
Tausend goldne Augen blinken lieblich in die Brust der Menschen,
Und des Mondes lichte Scheibe segelt heiter durch die Bläue.

Auf den goldnen Strahlen zittern süßer Wehmut Silbertropfen,
Dringen sanft mit leisem Hauche in das stille Herz voll Liebe,
Und befeuchten mir das Auge mit der Sehnsucht zartem Thaue.

Funkelnd prangt der Stern des Abends in den lichtbesäten Räumen,
Spielt mit seinen Demantblitzen durch der Lichte Duftgewebe,
Und viel holde Engelsknaben streuen Lilien um die Sterne.

Schön und hehr ist wohl der Himmel in des Abends Wunderglanze,
Aber meines Lebens Sterne wohnen in dem kleinsten Kreise:
In das Auge meiner Sylli sind sie alle hingezaubert.

The heavens laugh down pure and friendly upon the dark earth,
Thousand golden eyes shine lovingly into the breast of men,
And the bright disk of the moon sails merrily through the blue.

Silvery drops of sweet wistfulness tremble upon the golden rays,
Press gently with soft sighing full of love into the quiet heart,
And moisten my eyes with tender dew of longing.

The evening star shines sparkling in the light-sown space,
Plays with its diamond flashes through the fragrant web of light,
And many gentle angel youths strew lilies about the stars.

The heavens are fair and noble in the wondrous glow of evening,
But the stars of my life abide in the smallest circle:
They have all been enchanted into the eyes of my soul.

== Music ==
The 12-bar long lied in A major in 3/4 is scored for solo voice and piano.

A reminiscence – in the same key (A major), meter (3/4) and first four notes – of Schubert's Der Mondabend, a lied which Aloisia Bogner liked very much. The simple accompaniment of the song was probably intended to enable the dedicatee to perform it easily.

== Discography ==
There are two recording of "Der Mondabend":

- Robert Holzer (bass), Thomas Kerbl (piano), Anton Bruckner: Lieder, Chöre, Magnificat – CD: Gramola 99071, 2015; a reissue of CD LIVA 046 Anton Bruckner Lieder/Magnificat (2011), with, as an addition, the premiere recording of Der Mondabend. NB: Transposed to E major.
- Elisabeth Wimmer (soprano), Daniel Linton-France (piano), Bruckner, Anton – Böck liest Bruckner I – CD: Gramola 99195, 3 October 2018 – first and third strophes in Schubert’s setting, second and fourth in Bruckner's setting.
