= Wie bist du, Frühling, gut und treu, WAB 58 =

1856 lied composed by Anton Bruckner

Wie bist du Frühling, gut und treu
- Lied by Anton Bruckner
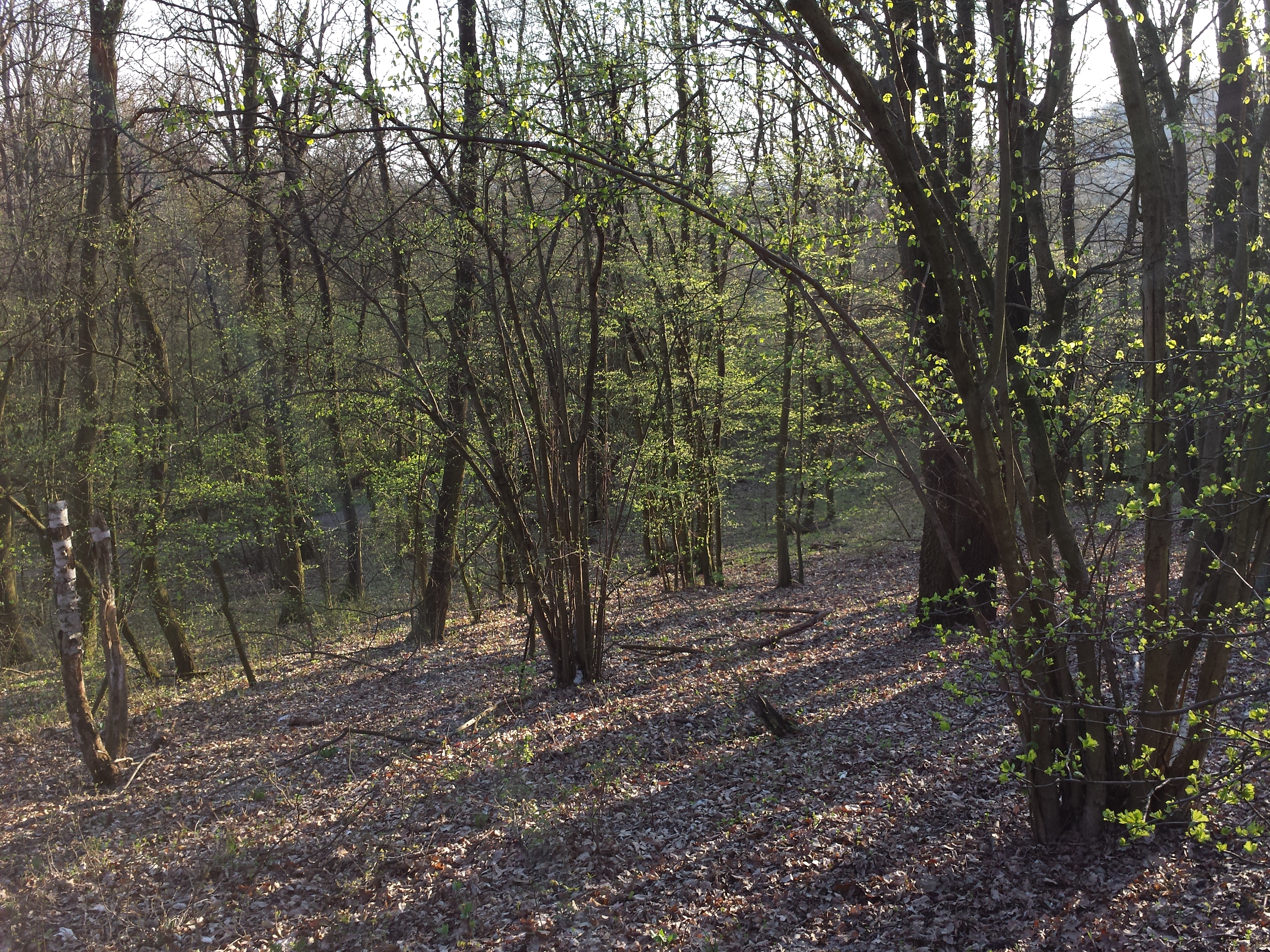
- Spring in Rohrwald, Lower Austria
- Key: G major
- Catalogue: WAB 58
- Text: Oskar von Redwitz
- Language: German
- Composed: 1856: St. Florian
- Dedication: Friedrich Mayer
- Vocal: Solo voice
- Instrumental: Piano

Wie bist du, Frühling, gut und treu ("Springtime, how good and faithful you are"), WAB 58 is a lied composed by Anton Bruckner in 1856 on a text of Oskar von Redwitz.

== History ==
Bruckner composed the lied on five strophes of Oskar von Redwitz' Amaranths Waldeslieder. He dedicated the work to Friedrich Mayer, prelate of the St. Florian Abbey.

Two original manuscripts are stored in the Wiener Stadt- und Landesbibliothek and by the editor Anton Böhn & Sohn in Augsburg. The lied was first published in 1902 by Max Marschalk in Die Musik, Band 1, No. 17. The first public performance occurred during a concert of the Wiener Akademischer Wagner-Verein on 5 February 1903 by Gisella Seehofer, who then also premiered Bruckner's Ave Maria, WAB 7 and Im April.

In 1930, a facsimile of it was published in Band III/2, pp. 184–188 of the Göllerich/Auer biography. The song is issued in Band XXIII/1, No. 2 of the Gesamtausgabe.

== Text ==
The song uses strophes 1, 2, 3, 8 & 9 of Oskar von Redwitz' Amaranths Waldeslieder.

Wie bist du, Frühling, gut und treu,
Daß nie du kömmst mit leerer Hand!
Du bringst dem Baume Blätter neu,
Dem Blümlein farbiges Gewand!

Du bringst das Lied dem Vögelein,
Durch dich so blau der Himmel lacht!
Du bringst der Welt den Sonnenschein.
Was hast du mir denn mitgebracht?

Waldvögelein! Wie singst du heut'
So herzlichlieb, wie nie zuvor!
Möcht' fliegen ja vor lauter Freud'
Ein Vöglein hoch zu Gott empor!

Ihr lieben Vöglein, singt nur fort,
So lang's vermag die kleine Brust!
Singt von des Frühlings Herrlichkeit,
Singt von des Frühlings Lieb' und Lust!

Und sänget ihr auch ewig fort,
Viel tausend Jahre Tag und Nacht,
Ihr könntet singen nie genug!
So schön hat Gott die Welt gemacht!

Springtime, how good and faithful you are,
That you never come with empty hands!
You bring new leaves to the tree,
And a colourful robe to the little flower!

You bring the song to the little bird,
By you, the sky laughs so blue!
You bring the sunshine to the world.
But, what have you brought to me?

Little forest bird! How kindly you sing
Today, as never before!
A little bird might for pure delight
fly upwards high to God!

Dear little birds, keep ever singing,
As long as your little chest is able!
Sing of the spring's splendour,
Sing of the spring's love and lust!

If you would you sing for ever,
Day and night for thousands of years,
You could never sing enough!
God made the world so beautiful!

== Music ==
The 102-bar long work in G major is scored for solo voice and piano.

== Discography ==
There are two recordings of Wie bist du Frühling, gut und treu:

- Robert Holzer (bass), Thomas Kerbl (piano), Anton Bruckner Lieder/Magnificat – CD: LIVA 046, 2011. NB: Transposed in E major.
- Elisabeth Wimmer (soprano), Daniel Linton-France (piano) in "Bruckner, Anton – Böck liest Bruckner I" – CD – Gramola 99195, 3 October 2018 (in 3 parts)

== Sources ==
- August Göllerich, Anton Bruckner. Ein Lebens- und Schaffens-Bild, c. 1922 – posthumous edited by Max Auer by G. Bosse, Regensburg, 1932
- Anton Bruckner – Sämtliche Werke, Band XXIII/1: Lieder für Gesang und Klavier (1851–1882), Musikwissenschaftlicher Verlag der Internationalen Bruckner-Gesellschaft, Angela Pachovsky (Editor), Vienna, 1997
- Cornelis van Zwol, Anton Bruckner 1824–1896 – Leven en werken, uitg. Thoth, Bussum, Netherlands, 2012. ISBN 978-90-6868-590-9
- Uwe Harten, Anton Bruckner. Ein Handbuch. Residenz Verlag, Salzburg, 1996. ISBN 3-7017-1030-9.
