= Magnificat (Bruckner) =

1852 work composed by Anton Bruckner

- by Anton Bruckner
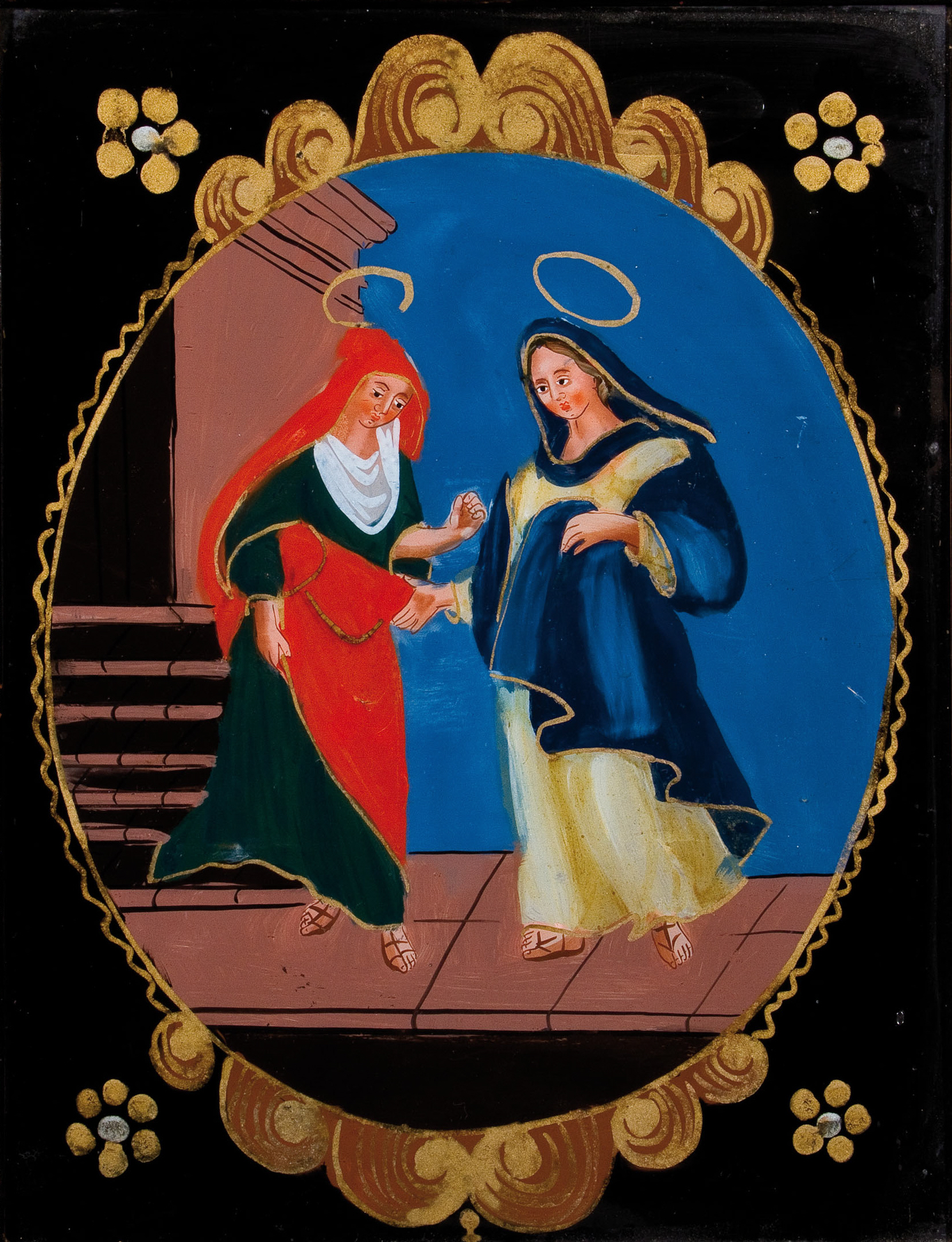
- Mary visiting Elizabeth, Rötenbach
- Key: B-flat major
- Catalogue: WAB 24
- Performed: 15 August 1852: St. Florian Monastery
- Published: 1996
- Recorded: 1984
- Vocal: SATB choir and soloists
- Instrumental: Orchestra and organ

The Magnificat, WAB 24 is a setting of the Magnificat for SATB choir and soloists, orchestra and organ composed by Anton Bruckner in 1852.

== History ==
Bruckner composed the work for the Vesper service of the feast of the Assumption of Mary. He dedicated the work to Ignaz Traumihler, the choirmaster of the St. Florian Abbey.

The work was premiered on 15 August 1852 in St. Florian. Despite the fact that Traumihler was a fervent adept of the Cecilian Movement, the work remained in the repertoire of the monastery. Other performances occurred on 25 December 1852, 15 May 1854, 25 December 1854 and 27 May 1855.

The work, the manuscript of which is stored in the archive of the St. Florian Abbey, was first published in volume II/2, pp. 99–110 of the Göllerich/Auer biography. It was critically edited by Paul Hawkshaw in 1996 in volume XX/3 of the Gesamtausgabe.

On 25 June 2017 a new edition of the score by Cohrs, prepared for the Anton Bruckner Urtext Gesamtausgabe, has been premiered by Łukasz Borowicz with the RIAS Kammerchor and the Akademie für Alte Musik Berlin.

== Setting ==
The 77-bar long composition in B♭ major is set in Allegro moderato for SATB choir and soloists, and orchestra (2 trumpets in B♭, timpani, and strings without violas). The organ supplies figured bass.

The first verse ("Magnificat") is sung by the soprano soloist. The next verses are sung as an Arioso alternatingly by the soloists and the choir. The setting is followed by the doxology Gloria Patri, starting by a unison on "Gloria Patri", the recap of the melody of the first verse on "Sicut erat", and concludes with a 23-bar long fugal Amen. Mean duration: 5 minutes.

The influence of Mozart is revealed through comparison to Mozart's Vespers K. 321 and K. 339.

== Discography ==
The first recording of Bruckner's Magnificat occurred in 1984:

- Jürgen Jürgens, Anton Bruckner - Music of the St. Florian Period, Monteverdi-Chor and Israel Chamber Orchestra – LP: Jerusalem Records ATD 8503 (Bruckner Archive Production), 1984. For this performance a score was specially prepared by William Carragan and David Aldeborgh. This long out-of-print LP has been transferred by John Berky to CD: BSVD-0109, 2011

There are three other recordings of this work:

- Franz Farnberger, Anton Bruckner in St. Florian - Requiem & Motetten, St. Florianer Sängerknaben and Instrumentalensemble St. Florian – CD: Studio SM D2639 SM 44, 1997. This performance, which was recorded in the St. Florian Abbey, provides the listener with a whiff of authenticity.
- Thomas Kerbl, Anton Bruckner – Lieder | Magnificat, Chorvereinigung Bruckner 2011 and Kammerorchester der Anton Bruckner Privatuniversität Linz – CD: Bruckner Haus LIVA 046, 2011
- Łukasz Borowicz, RIAS Kammerchor, Akademie für Alte Musik Berlin, Raphael Alpermann (Organ), Anton Bruckner – Missa solemnis – CD: Accentus ACC 30429, 2017 (Cohrs edition)

== Sources ==
- August Göllerich, Anton Bruckner. Ein Lebens- und Schaffens-Bild, c. 1922 – posthumous edited by Max Auer by G. Bosse, Regensburg, 1932
- Anton Bruckner – Sämtliche Werke, Band XX/3: Magnificat (1852), Musikwissenschaftlicher Verlag der Internationalen Bruckner-Gesellschaft, Paul Hawkshaw (Editor), Vienna, 1997
- Derek Watson, Bruckner, J. M. Dent & Sons Ltd, London, 1975
- Robert Simpson, Essence of Bruckner: An essay towards the understanding of his music, Victor Gollancz Ltd, London, 1977
- Uwe Harten, Anton Bruckner. Ein Handbuch. Residenz Verlag, Salzburg, 1996. ISBN 3-7017-1030-9.
- John Williamson, The Cambridge Companion to Bruckner, Cambridge University Press, Cambridge, 2004
- Cornelis van Zwol, Anton Bruckner - Leven en Werken, Thot, Bussum (Netherlands), 2012 - ISBN 90-686-8590-2
