= Mein Herz und deine Stimme, WAB 79 =

1868 lied composed by Anton Bruckner

Mein Herz und deine Stimme
- Lied by Anton Bruckner
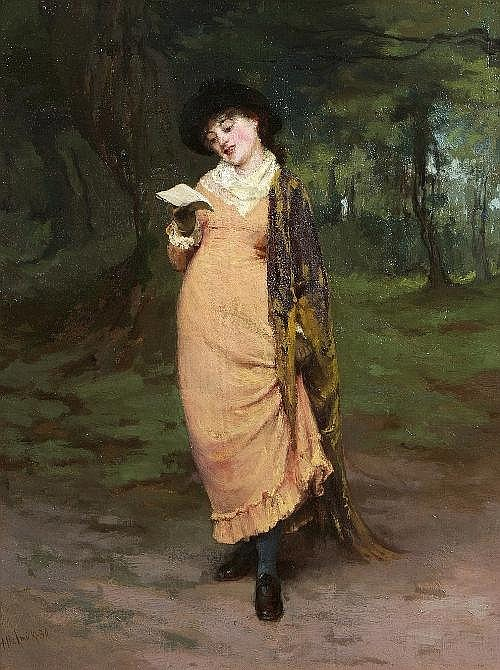
- The love letter by Howard Helmick
- Key: A major
- Catalogue: WAB 79
- Text: August von Platen
- Language: German
- Composed: 1868: Linz
- Dedication: Pauline Hofmann
- Vocal: Solo voice
- Instrumental: Piano

Mein Herz und deine Stimme (My heart and your voice), WAB 79 is a lied composed by Anton Bruckner in 1868.

== History ==
Bruckner composed the lied on a text of August von Platen, in 1868 during his stay in Linz. He dedicated it to Pauline Hofmann, sister of his pupil Helene Hofmann.

The original manuscript is lost, but a copy of it is stored in the archive of the Österreichische Nationalbibliothek. In 1930, the work was published in Band III/2, pp. 144–150 of the Göllerich/Auer biography. The song is issued in Band XXIII/1, No. 4 of the Gesamtausgabe.

== Text ==
The song is based on a text by August von Platen, to which Bruckner made three small changes:

Laß tief in dir mich lesen,
Verhehl' mir dies auch nicht,
Was für ein Zauberwesen
Aus deiner Stimme spricht?

So viele Worte dringen
Ans Ohr uns ohne Plan,
Und während sie verklingen,
Ist alles abgetan.

Doch drängt sich nur von Ferne
Dein Ton zu mir sich her,
Behorch' ich ihn so gerne,
Vergess' ich ihn so schwer.

Ich bebe dann, entglimme
Von allzu rascher Glut.
Mein Herz und deine Stimme
Versteh'n sich allzu gut.

Let me read deep in you,
Do not hide it from me,
What a magical being
Speaks in your voice?

So many words penetrate
Our ears without plan,
And while they fade away,
Everything is done.

However if even from afar
Your tone addresses me,
I so like to listen,
I forget it so hard.

I tremble then, I inflame
With all to quick ardour.
My heart and your voice
Understand each other all too well.

== Music ==
The 60-bar long work in A major is scored for solo voice and piano. The continuous triplet figures on the piano ensure a uniform background for the song.

== Discography ==
There are five recordings of Mein Herz und deine Stimme:

- Marie Luise Bart-Larsson (soprano), Gernot Martzy (piano), Kammermusikalische Kostbarkeiten von Anton Bruckner – CD: Weinberg Records SW 01 036-2, 1996
- Robert Holzer (bass), Thomas Kerbl (piano), Anton Bruckner Lieder/Magnificat – CD: LIVA 046, 2011. NB: Transposed in F major.
- Elisabeth Wimmer (soprano), Daniel Linton-France (piano) in "Bruckner, Anton – Böck liest Bruckner I" – CD – Gramola 99195, 3 October 2018
- Calmus Ensemble Mein Herz und deine Stimme, WAB 79 - Bruckner Vocal – Carus, 2023 (arr. Høybye for vocal quartet)
- Erinnerung - Bruckner in St. Florian, Alois Mühlbacher (countertenor), Franz Farnberger (grand piano) – CD: Solo Musica SM 450, 2024
- Günther Groissböck (bass), Malcolm Martineau (piano) - Männerliebe und Leben – CD Gramola 99294, 2024

== Sources ==
- August Göllerich, Anton Bruckner. Ein Lebens- und Schaffens-Bild, c. 1922 – posthumous edited by Max Auer by G. Bosse, Regensburg, 1932
- Anton Bruckner – Sämtliche Werke, Band XXIII/1: Lieder für Gesang und Klavier (1851–1882), Musikwissenschaftlicher Verlag der Internationalen Bruckner-Gesellschaft, Angela Pachovsky (Editor), Vienna, 1997
- Cornelis van Zwol, Anton Bruckner 1824–1896 – Leven en werken, uitg. Thoth, Bussum, Netherlands, 2012. ISBN 978-90-6868-590-9
- Uwe Harten, Anton Bruckner. Ein Handbuch. Residenz Verlag, Salzburg, 1996. ISBN 3-7017-1030-9.
- Crawford Howie, Anton Bruckner - A documentary biography, online revised edition
