= Herbstkummer, WAB 72 =

1864 lied composed by Anton Bruckner

Herbstkummer
- Lied by Anton Bruckner
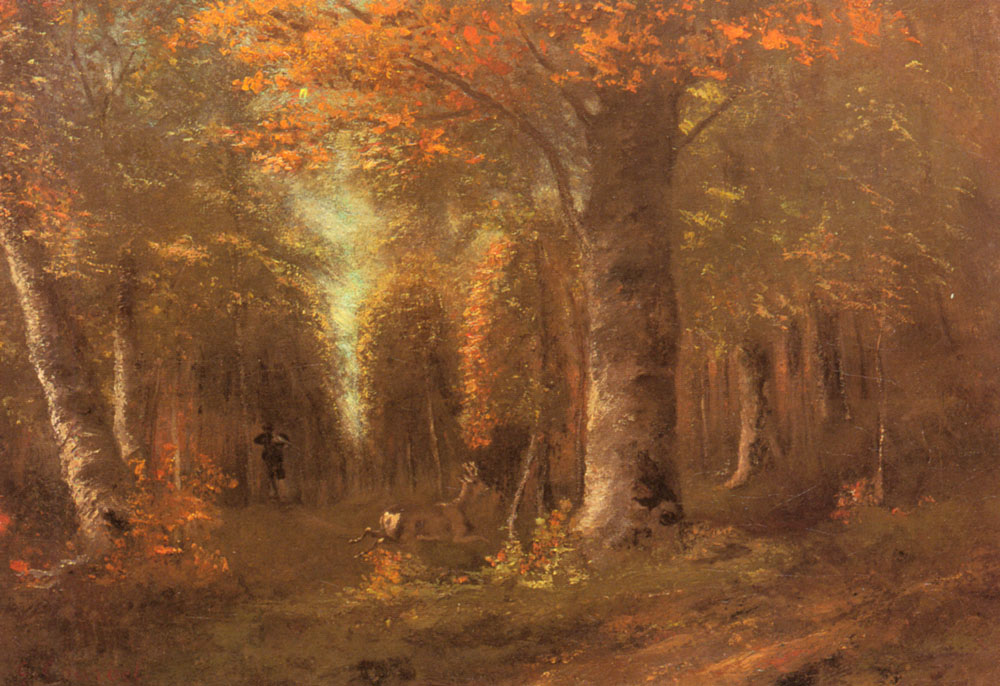
- Forest in Autumn by Gustave Courbet
- Key: E minor
- Catalogue: WAB 72
- Text: "Ernst"
- Language: German
- Composed: April 1864: Linz
- Vocal: Solo voice
- Instrumental: Piano

Herbstkummer ("Autumnal sorrow"), WAB 72 is a lied composed by Anton Bruckner in 1864.

== History ==
Bruckner composed the lied on the text of "Ernst", in April 1864 during his stay in Linz. It is not known for which purpose the lied was composed.

The original manuscript is lost, but a copy of it is stored in the archive of the Österreichische Nationalbibliothek. A transcription by Emil Posch is also found in the city archive of Linz. In 1930, the work was published in Band III/2, pp. 152–157 of the Göllerich/Auer biography. The song is issued in Band XXIII/1, No. 3 of the Gesamtausgabe.

== Text ==
The song uses a text by "Ernst".

Die Blumen vergehen, der Sommer ist hin,
Die Blätter verwehen. Das trübt mir den Sinn.
Ein Röslein, das bracht' ich im Sommer ins Haus,
Es hält ihn, so dacht' ich, den Winter wohl aus.
Die Vögelein sangen, es lauschte der Hain,
Die Rehlein, sie sprangen im Mondenschein,
Der Blümlein so viel hier erblühten im Tal,
Von allen gefiel mir das Röslein zumal.

Der Herbst ist gekommen, der Sturm braust heran,
Die Luft ist verglommen, der Winter begann.
Gern wollt' ich nicht klagen um Stürme und Schnee,
Könnt's Röslein ertragen das eisige Weh!
O schon' mir die Zarte, das liebliche Kind,
Die Eiche, die harte, umbrause du, Wind!
Blüh', Röslein, ohn' Bangen, von Liebe bewacht,
Bis Winter vergangen und Mai wieder lacht!

The flowers fade, the summer is over,
The leaves blow away. It clouds over my mind.
A little rose, which I brought inside in the summer,
Will, I thought, survive the winter.
The little birds sang, the grove listened,
The little deer sprang in the moonshine,
The many little flowers bloomed in the valley,
Of which the little rose was my favourite.

The autumn has come, the storm roars,
The air has faded, the winter began.
I would not lament over storms and snow,
If the little rose would stand the icy ache.
O, spare the frail one, the lovely child,
Roar around the oak instead, wind!
Bloom, little rose, without scare, guarded with love,
Until the winter is over and May laughs again!

== Music ==
The 62-bar long work in E minor is scored for solo voice and piano. The emotional mood of the romantic text is outlined by triplet figures on the piano, chromatic developments, fermata, pauses and the contrast E major/E minor.

== Discography ==
There are four recordings of Herbstkummer:

- Marie Luise Bart-Larsson (soprano), Gernot Martzy (piano), Kammermusikalische Kostbarkeiten von Anton Bruckner – CD: Weinberg Records SW 01 036-2, 1996
- Robert Holzer (bass), Thomas Kerbl (piano), Anton Bruckner Lieder/Magnificat – CD: LIVA 046, 2011. NB: Transposed in B minor.
- Elisabeth Wimmer (soprano), Daniel Linton-France (piano) in: Bruckner, Anton – Böck liest Bruckner II – CD Gramola 99237, 2020
- Calmus Ensemble Herbstkummer, WAB 72 - Bruckner Vocal – Carus, 2023 (Arr. Rathbone for Vocal Quartet)
- Günther Groissböck (bass), Malcolm Martineau (piano) - Männerliebe und Leben – CD Gramola 99294, 2024

== Sources ==
- August Göllerich, Anton Bruckner. Ein Lebens- und Schaffens-Bild, c. 1922 – posthumous edited by Max Auer by G. Bosse, Regensburg, 1932
- Anton Bruckner – Sämtliche Werke, Band XXIII/1: Lieder für Gesang und Klavier (1851–1882), Musikwissenschaftlicher Verlag der Internationalen Bruckner-Gesellschaft, Angela Pachovsky (Editor), Vienna, 1997
- Cornelis van Zwol, Anton Bruckner 1824–1896 – Leven en werken, uitg. Thoth, Bussum, Netherlands, 2012. ISBN 978-90-6868-590-9
- Uwe Harten, Anton Bruckner. Ein Handbuch. Residenz Verlag, Salzburg, 1996. ISBN 3-7017-1030-9.
- Crawford Howie, Anton Bruckner - A documentary biography, online revised edition
