= Franz Joseph Aumann =

Austrian composer

- Born: 24 February 1728
- Died: 30 March 1797 (aged 69)

Franz Joseph Aumann (also Auman, Aumon; 24 February 1728, Traismauer – 30 March 1797, Sankt Florian) was an Austrian composer. Before his voice broke, he sang in the same Viennese choir as Michael Haydn and Johann Georg Albrechtsberger, composers with whom he later in life traded manuscripts. In view of this circulation, it is not surprising that some of his music has been incorrectly attributed to Haydn. However, his Missa Profana, satirizing the stuttering and bad singing of a schoolmaster, was once attributed to Wolfgang Amadeus Mozart.

Aumann was ordained a priest in the Augustinian Order in St. Florian in 1757, essentially staying there for the rest of his life. He wrote many mass settings.

Aumann's music was a large part of the repertoire at St. Florian in the 19th century, and Anton Bruckner availed himself of this resource for his studies of counterpoint. Bruckner focused a lot of his attention on Aumann's Christmas responsories and an Ave Maria in D major. Bruckner, who liked Aumann's coloured harmony, added in 1879 an accompaniment by three trombones to his settings of Ecce quomodo moritur justus and Tenebrae factae sunt.

Aumann's oeuvre also includes instrumental music, such as some of the earliest string quintets.

== Works, editions and recordings ==
Recordings

- Gunar Letzbor, Franz Joseph Aumann – Requiem, St. Florianer Sängerknaben, Ars Antiqua Austria. Pan Classics PC 10234, 2008 (with Aumann's Ecce quomodo moritur justus, Tenebrae factae sunt and Te Deum)
