= Ave Maria, WAB 7 =

1882 setting of Ave Maria by Anton Bruckner

Ave Maria
- Motet by Anton Bruckner
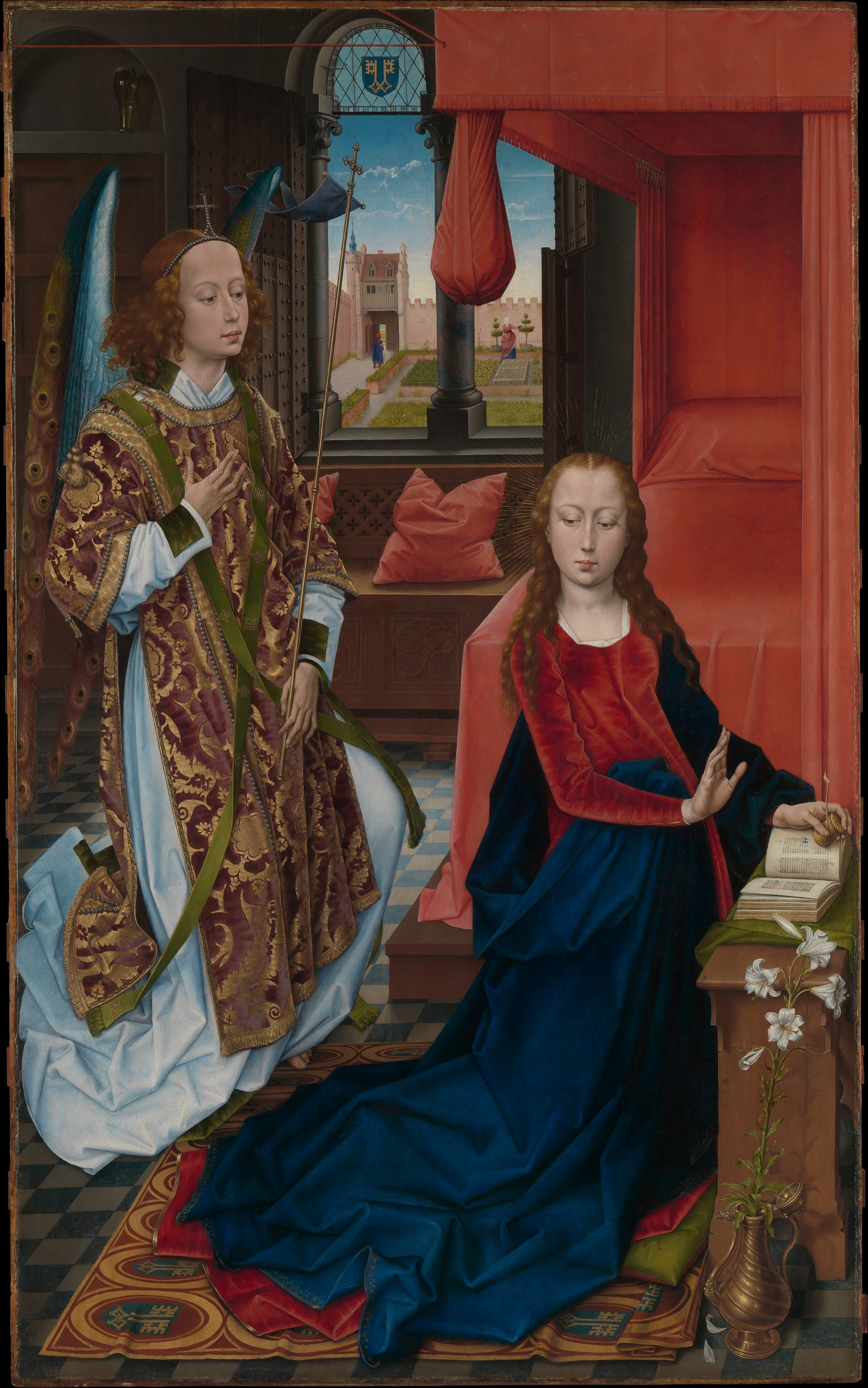
- The Annunciation by Rogier van der Weyden
- Key: F major
- Catalogue: WAB 7
- Form: Marian hymn
- Text: Ave Maria
- Language: Latin
- Composed: 5 February 1882: Vienna
- Dedication: Luise Hochleitner
- Performed: 5 February 1903: Vienna
- Published: 1902: Stuttgart
- Vocal: Alto soloist
- Instrumental: Organ, piano or harmonium

Ave Maria (Hail Mary), WAB 7, is a setting of the Latin prayer Ave Maria by Anton Bruckner.

== History ==
When staying in Wels during the summer of 1881 Bruckner met Luise Hochleitner, a singer with a beautiful alto voice. Bruckner promised to dedicate to her an Ave Maria. The work, which was composed on 5 February 1882, —almost 20 years after his more famous motet— is for alto (or baritone) solo voice and keyboard (organ, piano or harmonium).

The original manuscript is lost, but there are fair copies of it at the Österreichische Nationalbibliothek and the Abbey of Kremsmünster. The work was published in 1902 as an appendix to No. 13 of the Neue Musikzeitung, Stuttgart. The first public performance occurred during a concert of the Wiener Akademischer Wagner-Verein on 5 February 1903 by Gisella Seehofer, who then also premiered Bruckner's Wie bist du, Frühling, gut und treu and Im April. The motet is put in Band XXI/29 of the Gesamtausgabe.

== Setting ==
The 81-bar demanding work, scored in F major, requires a singer with a two-octave broad tessitura.

Like the two earlier settings of Ave Maria, the name Jesus is sung thrice (bars 23–31). It is followed by an instrumental interlude (bars 32–38) and goes then on with the second part (Sancta Maria), which quotes the 20-year earlier setting. Thereafter (bars 53–58) Nunc et in hora mortis nostrae is sung pianissimo in unison. After a repeat of Sancta Maria, it is ending by a two-octave descending arpeggio on Amen (from F_{5} to F_{3}) and a short instrumental postlude (bars 76–81).

== Selected discography ==
The first recording was:

- Ingrid Günther (alto), Herbert Günther (BRT-Radio-Sinfonie-Orchester), Bruckner – Missa Solemnis in B – LP: Garnet G 40 170, c. 1980

In the majority of the about 20 recordings the singer is skipping the lower octave of the Amen. A selection among the few recordings, in which the singer is doing it faithfully:

- Anne-Marie Owens (mezzo-soprano), Peter King (organ), Mass No. 2 / Motets (Simon Halsey) – CD: Conifer CDCF 192, 1990
- Peter Matuszek (baritone), Vladimir Roubal (organ), Canti Sacri – CD: Rosa RD 151-2, 1994
- Sigrid Hagmüller (alto), Rupert Gottfried Frieberger (organ), Anton Bruckner – Oberösterreichische Kirchenmusik – CD: Fabian Records CD 5112, 1995
- Vera Ilieva (mezzo-soprano; transposed to A-flat major), Burkhard Pütz (organ), Ave Maria – CD: CSD 100 057, 1999
- Günther Groissböck (bass), Matthias Giesen (organ), In Te Domine Speravi – Gramola CD 99327, 2024

== Sources ==
- Anton Bruckner - Sämtliche Werke, Band XXI: Kleine Kirchenmusikwerke, Musikwissenschaftlicher Verlag der Internationalen Bruckner-Gesellschaft, Hans Bauernfeind and Leopold Nowak (Editor), Vienna, 1984/2001
- Cornelis van Zwol, Anton Bruckner 1824-1896 - Leven en werken, uitg. Thoth, Bussum, Netherlands, 2012. ISBN 978-90-6868-590-9
- Uwe Harten, Anton Bruckner. Ein Handbuch. Residenz Verlag, Salzburg, 1996. ISBN 3-7017-1030-9.
