= Der Mondabend =

"Der Mondabend" ("The moonlit evening") is a poem by Johann Gottfried Kumpf, who published his poetry under the pseudonym Ermin in Carinthia, a periodical he had founded in 1811.

In 1815 Franz Schubert set "Der Mondabend" for voice and piano. It was first published in 1830 in Vienna, as No. 1 of Op. posth. 131. Later the song was known as D 141. The other two songs of Op. 131 were D 148 (for tenor, men's choir and piano), and 23 (for voice and piano). The only other poem by Kumpf that was set by Schubert was "Mein Gruß an den Mai", D 305.

"Der Mondabend", WAB 200, is a reminiscence – in the same key (A major), meter (3/4) and first four notes – of Schubert's "Der Mondabend", that Anton Bruckner composed for Aloisia Bogner c. 1850.
