= Joseph Balthasar Hochreither =

Austrian organist and composer

Joseph Balthasar Hochreither (Salzburg, 16 April 1669 - Salzburg, 14 December 1731) was an Austrian organist and composer. He may have been a student of Heinrich Biber.

== Works, editions and recordings ==
- Vesperae Joannis Hochenreitter [Joseph Balthasar Hochreither] de Anno 1706 in folio.
- Requiem (1712); Missa Jubilus sacer (1731). St. Florianer Sängerknaben, Ars Antiqua Austria, dir. Gunar Letzbor. Pan Classics PC 10264.

== Links ==
- Deinhammer, Peter (2008) Joseph Balthasar Hochreither (1669-1731). Dissertation, Universität Wien.
