= Ars Antiqua Austria =

Austrian period music ensemble

Ars Antiqua Austria is an early music ensemble founded in Linz in 1989 to perform Austrian Baroque music on period instruments. The group was established by Gunar Letzbor and Michael Oman and consists of eight musicians. They research and perform neglected works.

During the Baroque period, Austrian music had many influences: Italian, French, Spanish, Slavic, and Hungarian. These blended with Austrian folk music and dance music. Aside from its native Austria, the group has toured France, Germany, Slovakia, Ukraine, and the U.S. It received a Cannes Classical Award in 2002 for Viviani's "Capricci Armonici".
