= St. Florian Monastery =

Austrian monastery

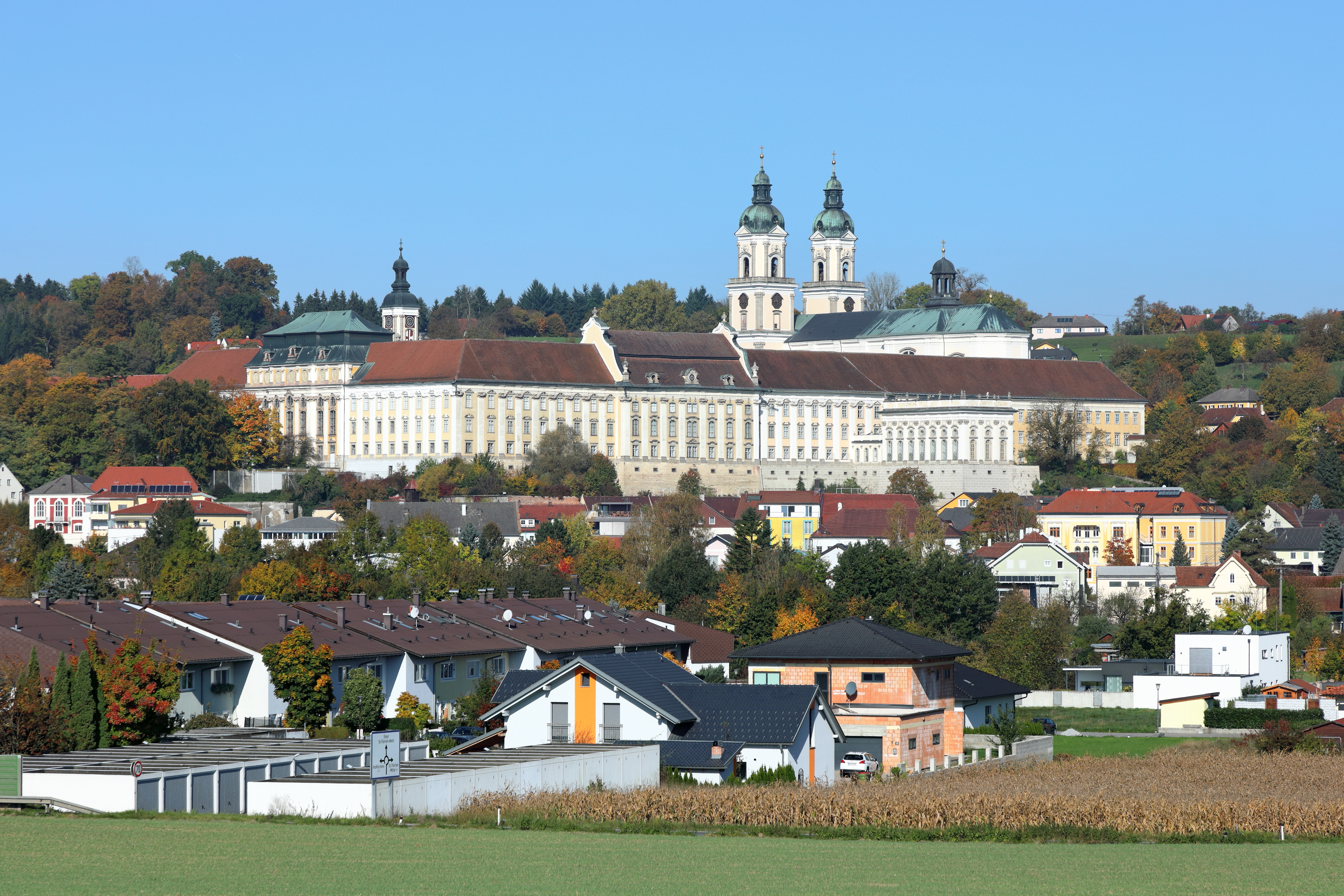
- St. Florian Monastery in Sankt Florian, Austria

- Location within Austria

Religion
- Affiliation: Catholic Church
- Ecclesiastical or organisational status: Active
- Year consecrated: 1071

Location
- Location: Sankt Florian, Austria
- State: Linz-Land District, Upper Austria
- Coordinates: 48.207251°N 14.378765°E

Architecture
- Architects: Carlo Antonio Carlone; Jakob Prandtauer
- Type: Monastery
- Style: Baroque
- Founder: Bishop Altmann of Passau

St. Florian Monastery (German: Stift Sankt Florian) is an Augustinian monastery in the town of Sankt Florian, Austria. Founded in the early ninth century, and later refounded by Augustinians in the eleventh century, St. Florian is the largest monastery in Upper Austria, and rivals Melk Abbey and Klosterneuburg Monastery, as among the most impressive examples of Baroque architecture in Austria. The monastery is dedicated to Saint Florian, (Note: Saint Florian was a Roman officer of the imperial army in the Roman province of Noricum in present-day Austria. Following his conversion to Christianity, the Roman regime sent Aquilinus to Noricum to persecute Christians. When Aquilinus ordered Florian to offer sacrifice to the Roman gods in accordance with Roman religion, he refused, and accepted the beatings and torture of his fellow soldiers, who finally executed him by tying a stone around his neck and drowning him in the Enns river in 304. After his body washed ashore near present-day Sankt Florian, a woman named Valeria had a vision in which Florian declared his intent to be buried in an appropriate place. According to tradition, his body was buried on the spot where a fourth-century wooden church and the later monasteries were built.) whose fourth century grave lies beneath the monastery.

== History ==
The monastery, named after Saint Florian, was founded in the Carolingian period. Since 1071 it has housed a community of Augustinian Canons, and is thus is one of the oldest operational monasteries in the world following the Rule of St. Augustine.

Between 1686 and 1708 the monastery complex was reconstructed in Baroque style by Carlo Antonio Carlone, whose masterpiece is St. Florian's. After his death, Jakob Prandtauer continued the work. The result is the biggest Baroque monastery in Upper Austria. (Note: The south tower and parts of the church walls are still medieval in substance and were only given a Baroque veneer.) Bartolomeo Altomonte created the frescoes.

Construction of the library wing began in 1744, under Johann Gotthard Hayberger. The library comprises about 130,000 items, including many manuscripts. The gallery contains numerous works of the 16th and 17th centuries, but also some late medieval works of the Danube School, particularly by Albrecht Altdorfer.

In 1827, Polish librarian Father Josef Chmel found one of the oldest Polish literary artifacts, an illuminated manuscript containing the Psalms in Latin, German and Polish in the monastery. Because of the site of discovery, it has been named the Sankt Florian Psalter, and now resides in the National Library of Poland.

In January 1941, the Gestapo seized the facility and expelled the monks. From 1942, the Reichsrundfunkgesellschaft ("Radio Society of the Third Reich"), under general director Heinrich Glasmeier, operated from here. The canons returned after the end of the war.

The premises now also house the Upper Austrian Fire Brigade Museum.

== Basilica ==
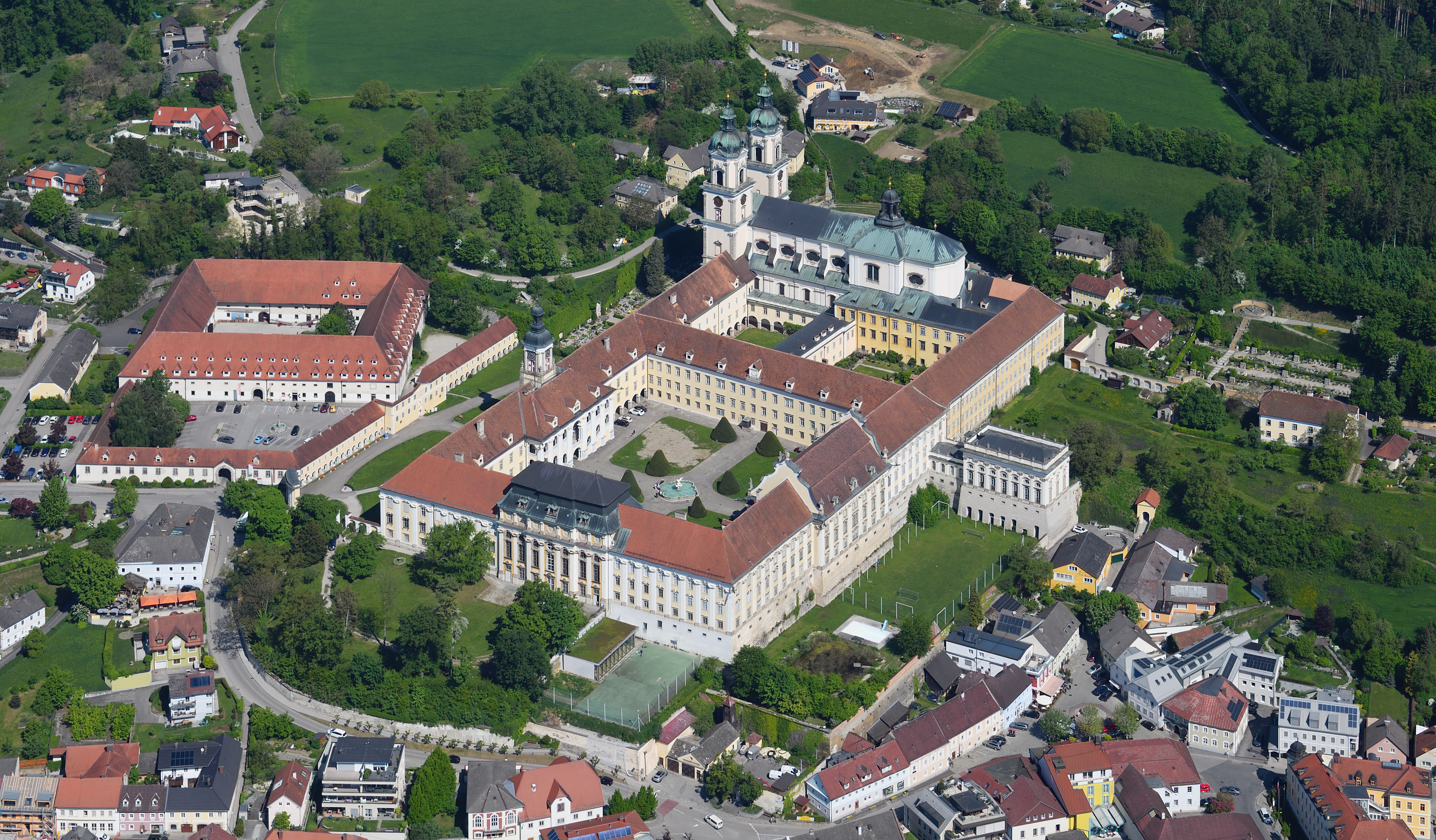
Aerial view of St. Florian Monastery

The canons' church was elevated to a basilica minor in 1999. It is dedicated to Saint Florian and Saint Augustine.

St. Florian's Priory possesses two organs, the larger one of which is known as the "Bruckner organ" (Brucknerorgel) and contains four manuals, 103 stops and 7,343 pipes. It was played by composer and organist Anton Bruckner, previously a choirboy at the monastery, when he was the organist, between 1848 and 1855. He is buried beneath the organ inside the church.

== Bells ==
=== Main Bells ===
Twelve bells are distributed between the two west towers, with the Great Bell mounted separately in the northwest tower. It is one of the largest bells in Austria and rings every Thursday evening in remembrance of Christ's agony in the Garden of Gethsemane; hence its nickname, the "Angstglocke" (Angst Bell ). During the 2003 renovation, the two striking bells of the trumpet tower were added. The main peal, which rings together, consists of the seven largest bells. These bells, dating from the 14th century, especially the Twelve, the Eleven, the Six, and the First Choir Bell, are testaments to the high art of bell casting. They originated from a St. Florian foundry and are dated 1318 and 1319.

| No. | name | Casting year | Foundry | Weight (kg) | Tower |
|---|---|---|---|---|---|
| 1 | Fear bell (Bourdon) | 1717 | Mathias Prininger | 8643 | North |
| 2 | Women' bell (2nd Bourdon) | 1648 | Martin Fitler | 5376 | South |
| 3 | Twelve | 1318 | St. Florian Workshop | 1560 | South |
| 4 | Eleven | 1318 | St. Florian Workshop | 800 | South |
| 5 | Six | 1319 | St. Florian Workshop | 550 | South |
| 6 | Birth bell | 2000 | Rudolf Perner , Passau | 238 | South |
| 7 | 1st Choir Bell | 1319 | St. Florian Workshop | 300 | South |
| 8 | − | 14th century | St. Florian Workshop | 230 | South |
| 9 | Train Bell | 1689 | Johann Gordian Schelchshorn | 90 | South |
| 10 | 2nd Choir Bell | 1471 | Jörg Golpitscher | 112 | South |
| 11 | Evangelists bell | 14th century | St. Florian Workshop | 60 | South |
| 12 | Loreto | 1690 | Italian foundry | 15 | South |

=== Choir or secondary bells ===
Furthermore, there is an eight-bell choir peal. It serves as a secondary peal for daily use (calling the monks to choral prayer three times a day in the oratory ). The disposition follows a pure C major scale. Musically and technically, it is designed as a so-called cymbal peal: the wall thickness (rib) of the bells increases with increasing pitch, the range extending to the three-line octave (c3 ) . The bells bear, in ascending order, the invocation and the seven petitions of the Lord's Prayer.

| No. | Casting year | Foundry | Weight (kg) | Diameter (mm) | inscription |
|---|---|---|---|---|---|
| 1 | 2000 | Karlsruhe Bell and Art Foundry | 320 | 768 | "Our Father" |
| 2 | 2000 | Karlsruhe Bell and Art Foundry | 268 | 723 | “Hallowed be your name” |
| 3 | 2000 | Karlsruhe Bell and Art Foundry | 223 | 665 | "Thy kingdom come" |
| 4 | 2000 | Karlsruhe Bell and Art Foundry | 178 | 627 | "Thy will be done" |
| 5 | 2000 | Karlsruhe Bell and Art Foundry | 146 | 571 | "Give us this day our daily bread" |
| 6 | 2000 | Karlsruhe Bell and Art Foundry | 102 | 511 | "Forgive us our debts" |
| 7 | 2000 | Karlsruhe Bell and Art Foundry | 82 | 470 | "Lead us not into temptation" |
| 8 | 2000 | Karlsruhe Bell and Art Foundry | 64 | 446 | "Deliver us from evil" |

== List of provosts from 1382 ==
- Stephan Zainkgraben, officiated 1382–1407
- Jodok I. Pernschlag, officiated 1407–1417
- Kaspar I. Seisenecker, officiated 1417–1436
- Lukas Fridensteiner von Maur, officiated1436–1459, bekam 1458 von Papst Pius II. (1458–1464) das Recht der Pontifikalien
- Johann II. Stieger, officiated 1459–1467
- Kaspar II. Vorster, officiated 1467–1481
- Peter II. Sieghartner, officiated 1481–1483
- Leonhard Riesenschmied, officiated 1483–1508
- Peter III. Maurer, officiated 1508–1545, resigned
- Florian Muth, officiated 1545–1553
- Siegmund Pfaffenhofer, officiated 1553–1572
- Georg I. Freuter, officiated 1573–1598
- Vitus (Veit) Widmann, officiated 1599–1612, died 20 January 1612
- Leopold I. Zehetner, born ca. 1581 in Gemering, officiated 1612–1646, died 30 September 1646 in St. Florian
- Matthias Gotter, officiated 1646–1666
- David Fuhrmann, born 1621 in Straubing, officiated 1667–1689, died 6 Oktober 1689 in Linz
- Matthäus I. von Weißenberg, born 1644 in Steyr, officiated 1689–1700, died 1700 in St. Florian
- Franz Klausius (Clausius) Kröll, officiated 1700–1716
- Johann III. Födermayr, officiated 1716–1732
- Johann Georg II. Wiesmayr, born 4 April 1695, officiated 1732–1755
- Engelbert II. Hofmann, officiated 1755–1766
- Matthäus II. Gogl, officiated 1766–1777
- Leopold II. Trulley, officiated 1777–1793
- Michael I. Ziegler, born 22 February 1744, officiated 1793–1823, died 5 May 1823 in St. Florian
- Michael II. Arneth, geb. 9. January 1771, amtierte als Propst 1823–1854, died 24 March 1854 in St. Florian
- Friedrich (Theophil) Mayer, born 4 October 1793 in Stockheim, officiated 1854–1858, died 29 December 1858 in Rom
- Jodok II. Stülz, born 23 February 1799 in Bezau, officiated 1859–1872
- Ferdinand Moser, born 8 November 1827 in Gmunden, officiated 1872–1901, died 29 October 1901 in St. Florian
- Josef Sailer, born 9 September 1839, officiated 1901–1920, died 29 January 1920 in St. Florian
- Vinzenz Hartl, born 6 December 1872 in Herzogsdorf, officiated 1920–1944, died 10 April 1944 in Pulgarn
- Leopold Hager, born 1 November 1889 in St. Gotthard, officiated 1944–1968, resigned 1968, died 24 February 1972
- Johannes Zauner, born 1913 in Walding, died 24 September 1977, officiated 1968–1977
- Wilhelm Neuwirth, born 12 March 1941, officiated 1977–2005
- Johann Holzinger, born 12 April 1951, officiated since 2005

== St. Florian Boys Choir ==
St. Florian is also known for the St. Florian Boys Choir (St. Florianer Sängerknaben), a boys' choir founded in 1071. This choir has been a traditional part of the monastic worship from its foundation. It still has particular responsibility for sacred music for the priory, but also now undertakes international concert tours, television appearances and making CDs.

=== Selected discography ===
- Franz Farnberger, Anton Bruckner in St. Florian – Requiem & Motetten, St. Florianer Sängerknaben - CD: Studio SM D2639 SM 44, 1997 (with Bruckner's Magnificat & Psalm 22)
- Gunar Letzbor, Franz Joseph Aumann - Requiem, St. Florianer Sängerknaben, Ars Antiqua Austria - CD: Pan Classics PC 10234, 2008 (with Aumann's Ecce quomodo moritur justus, Tenebrae factae sunt and Te Deum)
- Gunar Letzbor, Joseph Balthasar Hochreither - Requiem; Missa Jubilus sacer. St. Florianer Sängerknaben, Ars Antiqua Austria - CD: Pan Classics PC 10264, 2014

== Gallery ==
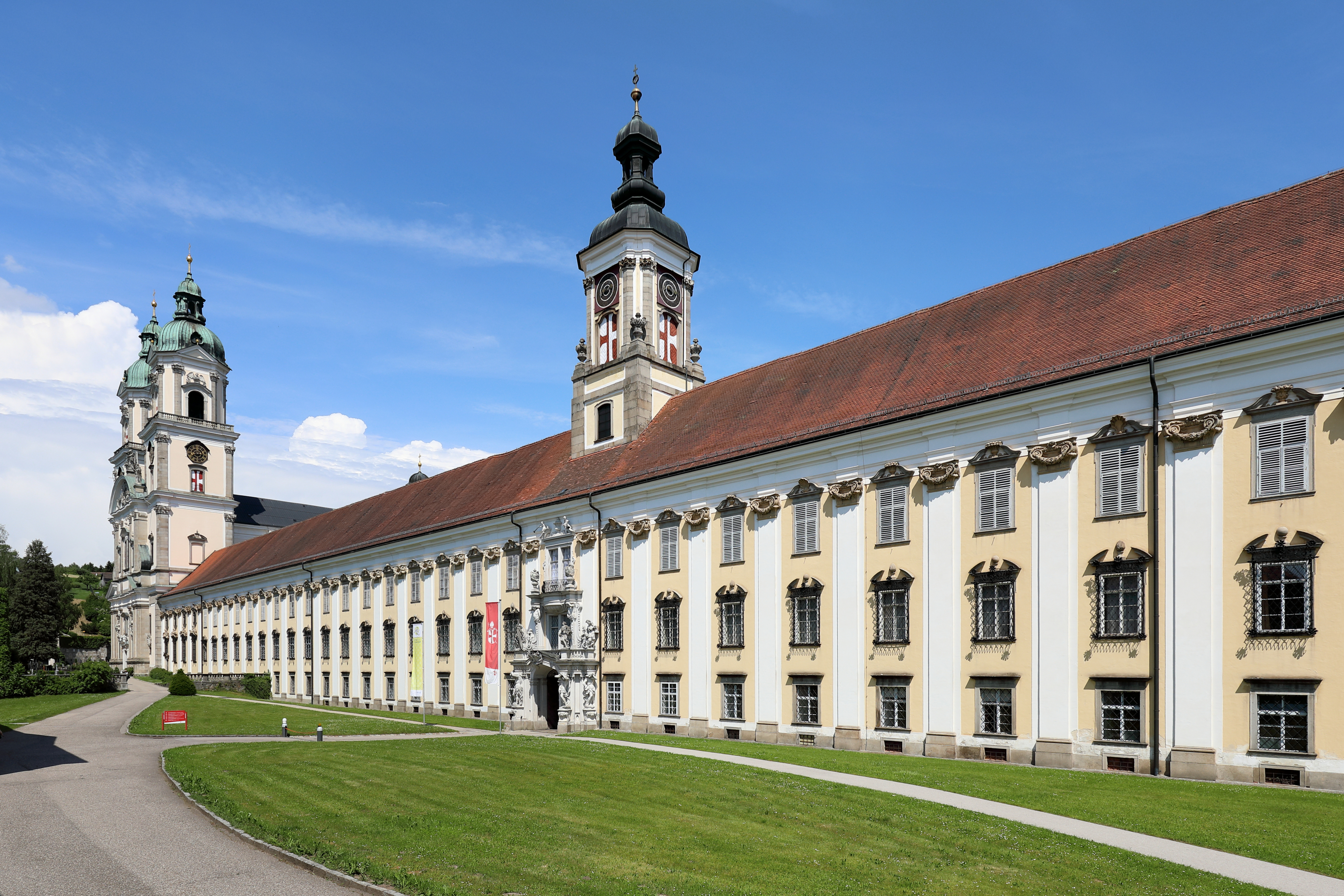
West façade with church

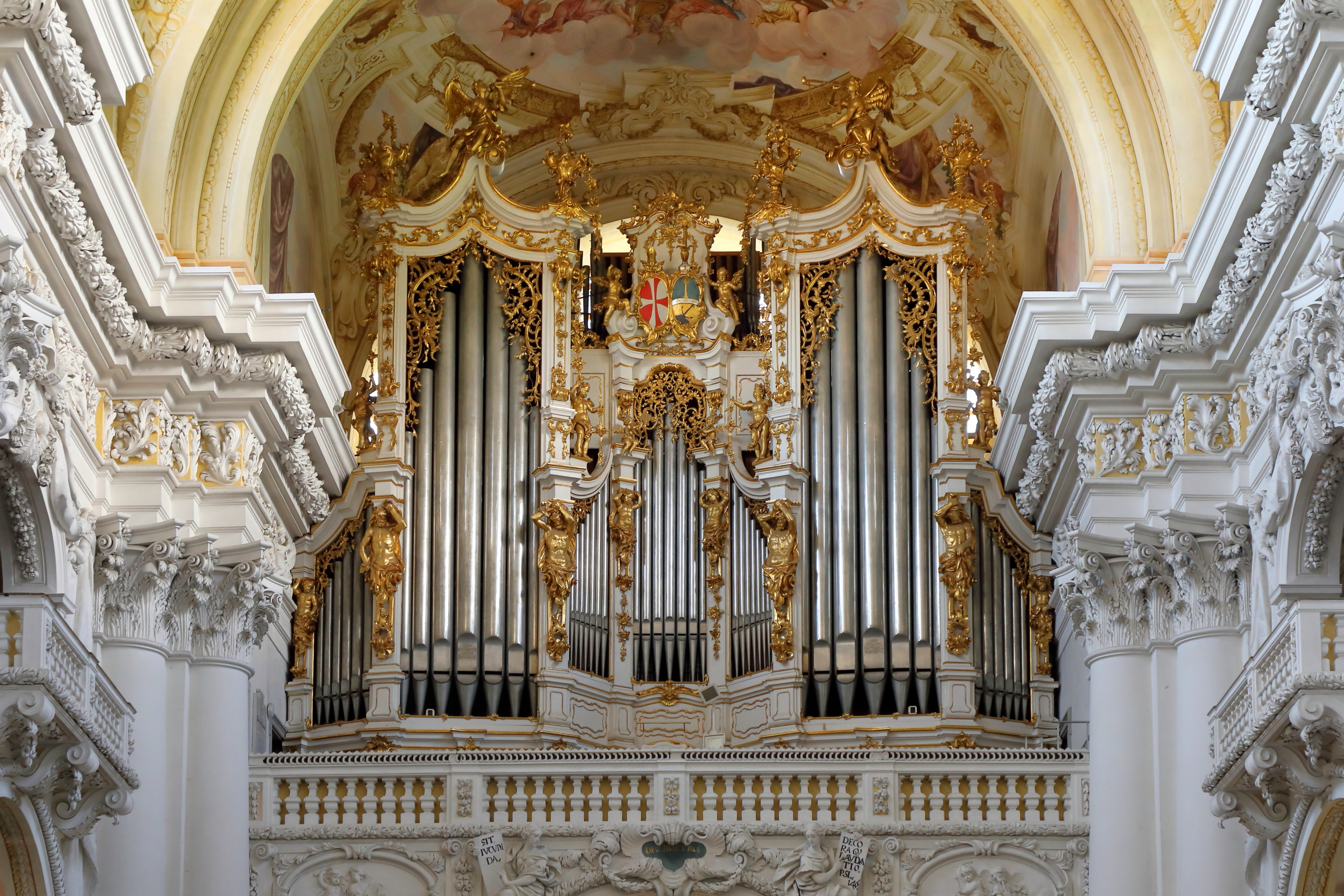
Organ loft with the Bruckner organ

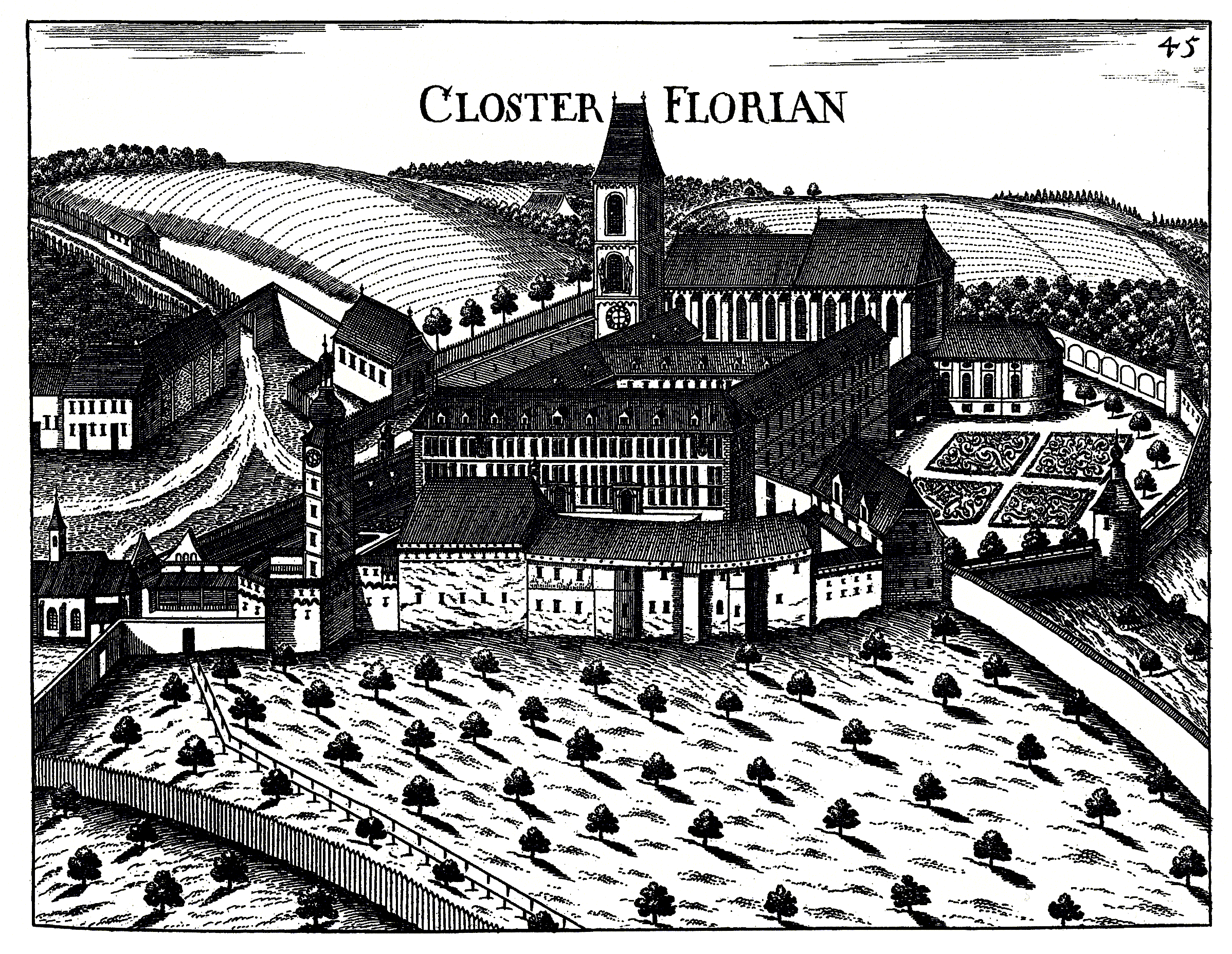
Drawing by Georg Matthäus Vischer, 1674

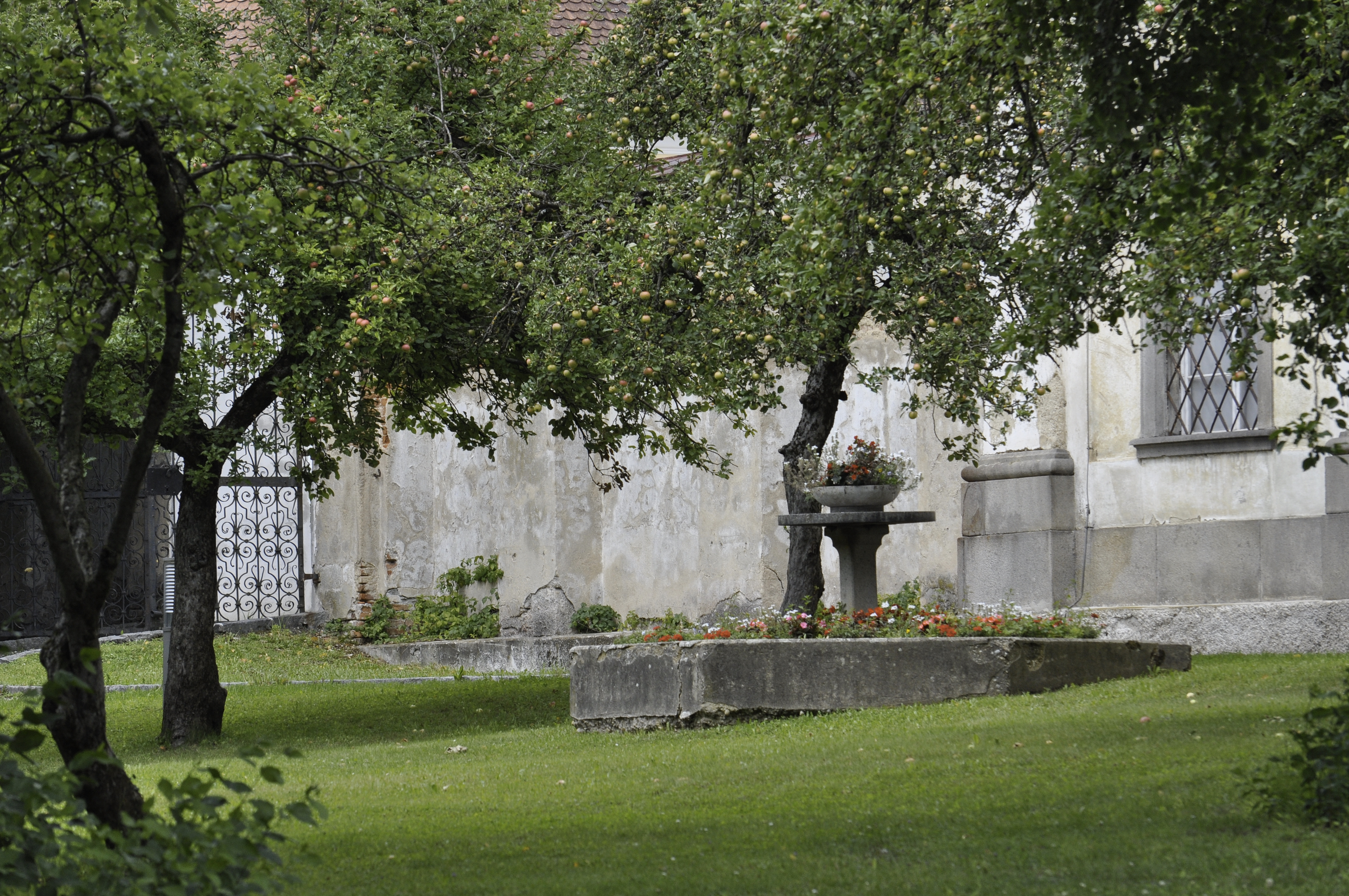
Prälatengarten

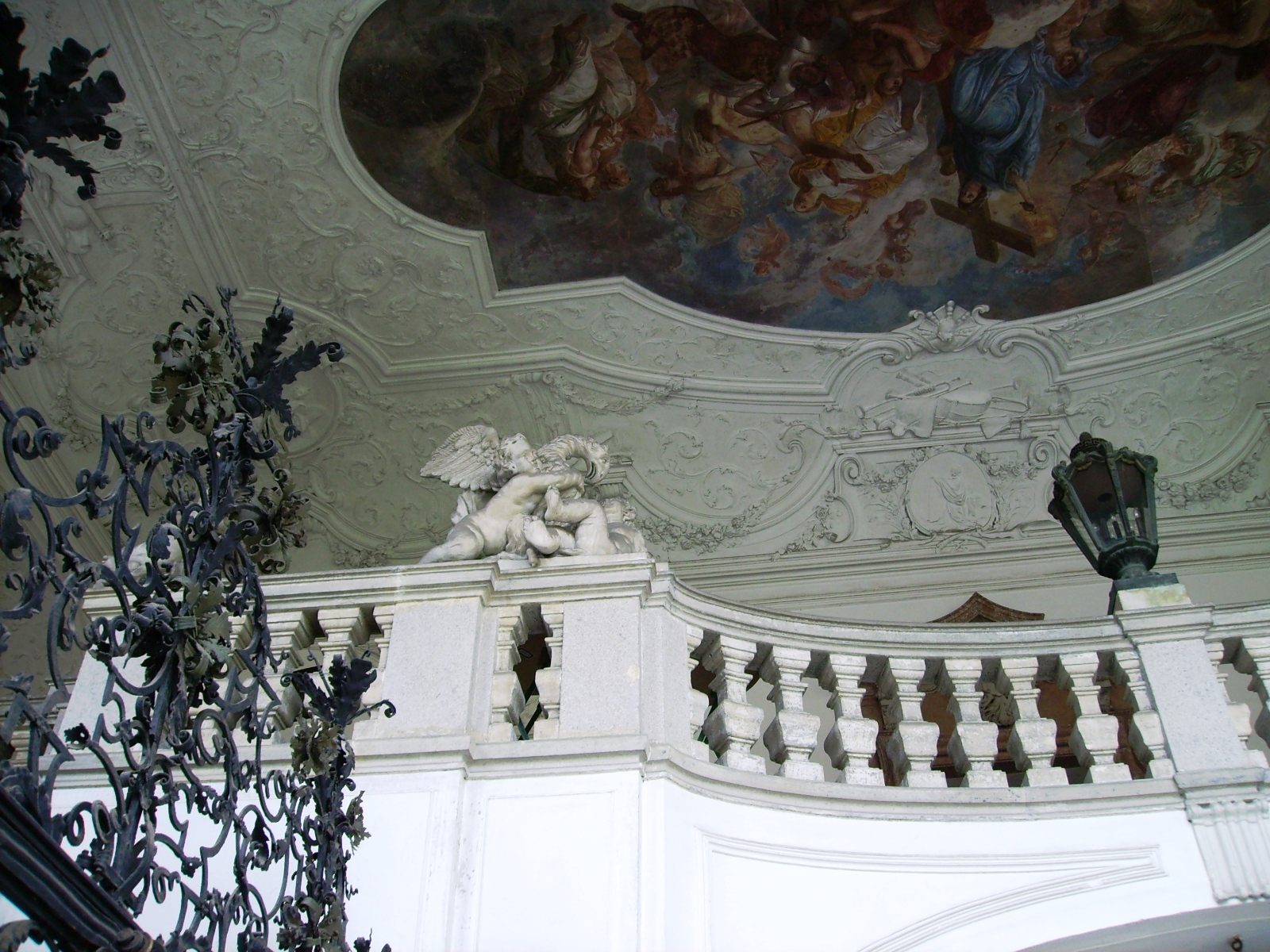
St. Florian Monastery balustrade and ceiling detail

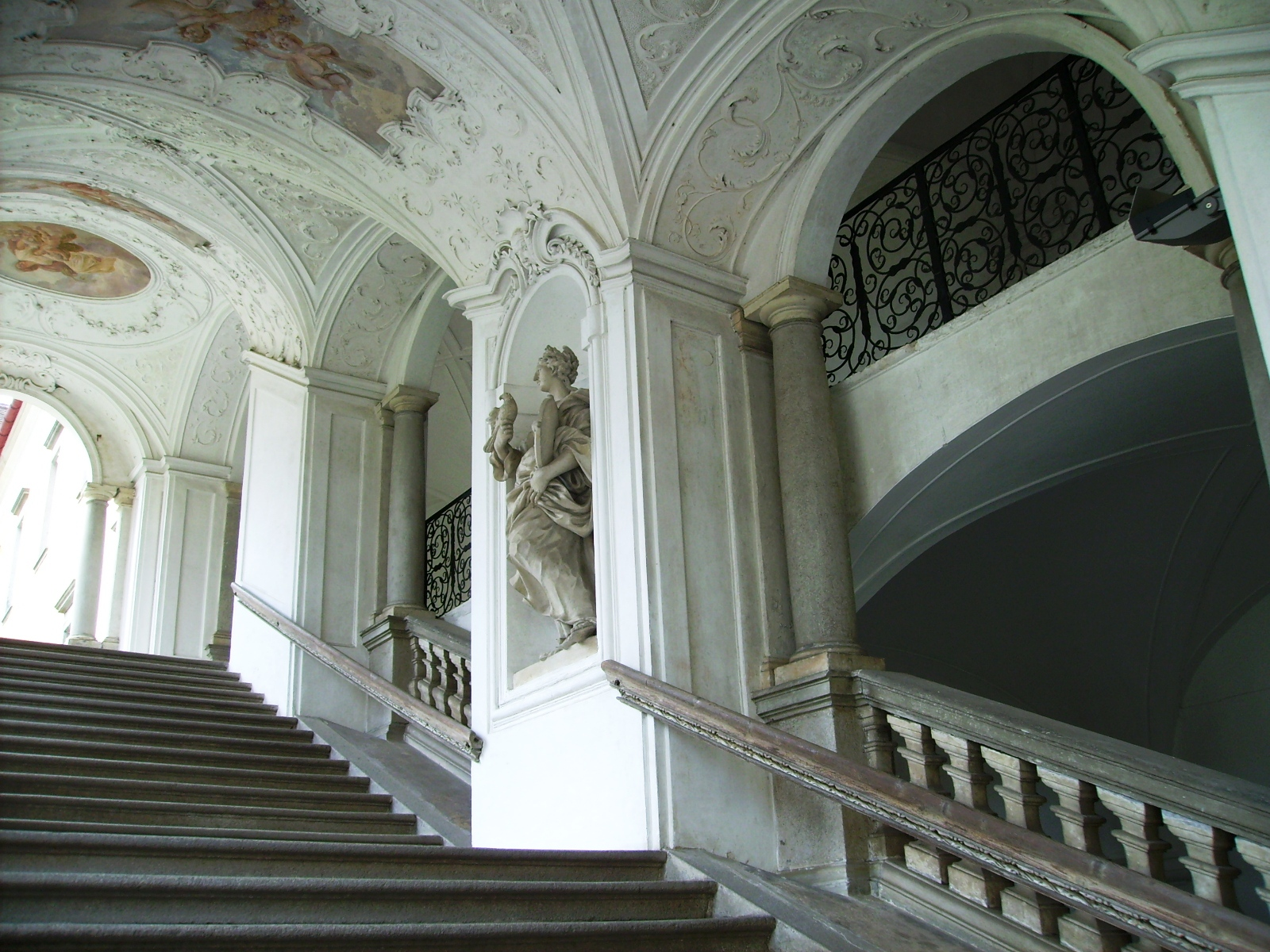
Interior stairway
