= Dârjiu fortified church =

Unitarian fortified church in Romania

Dârjiu Fortified Church
- Biserica fortificată din Dârjiu
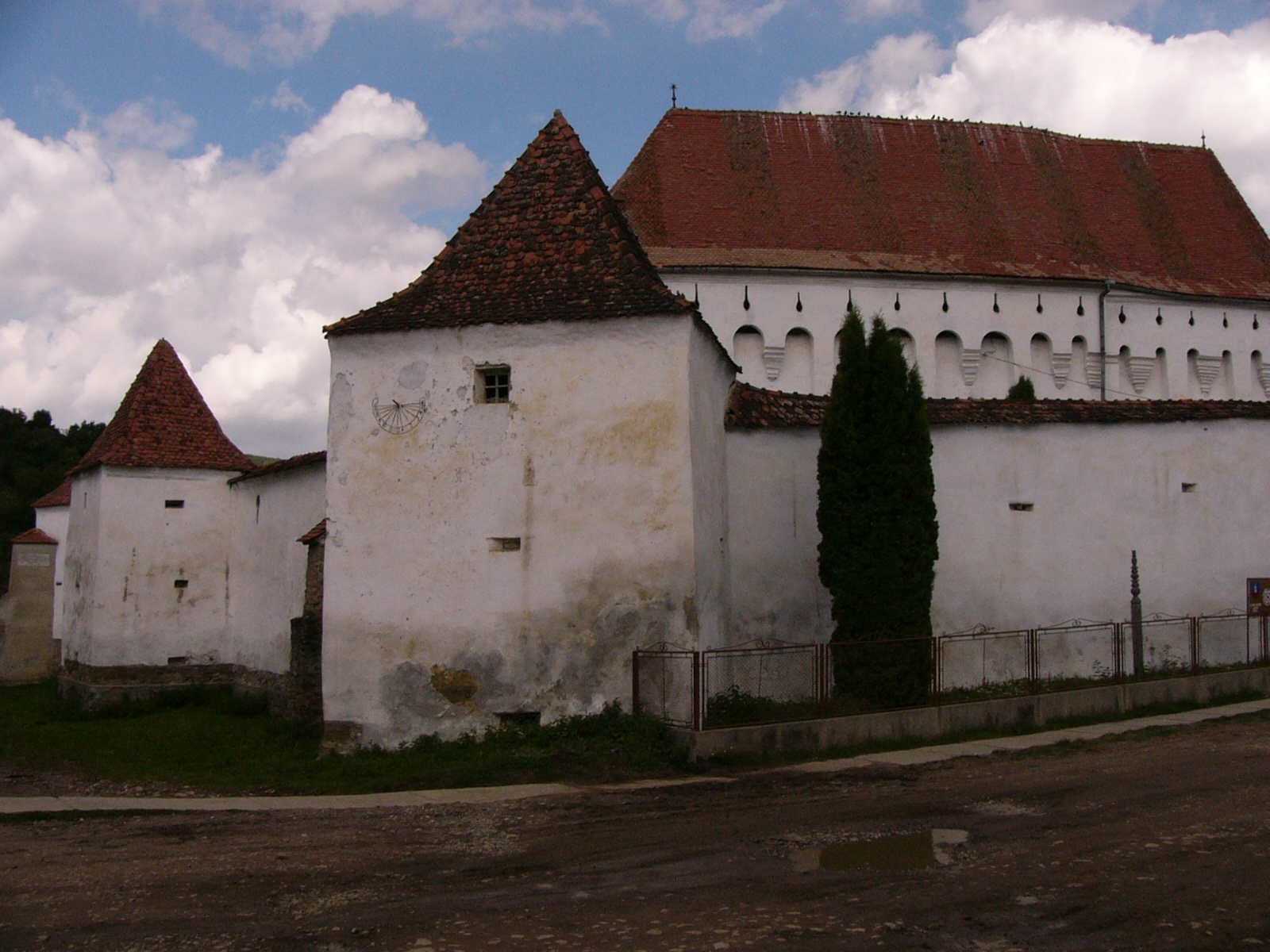

Religion
- Affiliation: Unitarian

Location
- Location: Dârjiu, Romania
- Interactive map of Dârjiu Fortified Church
- Coordinates: 46.202202°N 25.199234°E

Architecture
- Type: Fortified church
- Style: Gothic
- Groundbreaking: 14th century
- Completed: 16th century
- UNESCO World Heritage Site
- Official name: Villages with fortified churches in Transylvania
- Type: Cultural
- Criteria: iv
- Designated: 1993 (17th session); 1999 (23rd session – Extension)
- Reference no.: 596bis
- State Party: Romania
- Region: Europe and North America
- Monument istoric
- Official name: Historic monuments in Harghita County
- Type: architectural
- Reference no.: LMI Code: HR-II-a-A-12813 (RAN Code: 84399.02)

The Dârjiu fortified church (Romanian: Biserica fortificată din Dârjiu; Hungarian: Székelyderzsi erődtemplom) is a Unitarian fortified church in Dârjiu (Székelyderzs), Harghita County, in the Transylvania region of Romania. It was built by the Székely Hungarian community at a time when the area belonged to the Kingdom of Hungary. Initially Roman Catholic, it became Unitarian following the Reformation. The church is noted for its interior frescoes, and together with the surrounding village, forms part of the villages with fortified churches in Transylvania UNESCO World Heritage Site.

== Description ==
=== Church and fortifications ===
First built in Romanesque style in the 14th–15th centuries, the church was transformed into a Gothic one in the latter part of the 15th century. The semi-cylindrical rib-vaulted arches, which reach into the nave and the choir, date to the first half of the 16th century. The vaults are supported by corbels that in the choir have carved decorations: a pelican with chicks, the sun, the moon, masks and a symmetrical plowshare. The buttresses date to the same period and are linked by a corbel and little arches that support the battlement. The church is 28 metres long, 7 metres wide and 20 metres high; the slate roof is from 1760.

The fortifications, erected in 1400, reached their final form around 1530. The 5 m high walls form a square; their bastions are at an oblique angle and jut out from the walls at all four corners. A similar bastion is found in the middle of the western wall. The fortifications' oldest and most visible element, the tower, is to the south of the church. The gate tower retains its original form, with openings for firing guns that can be closed with wooden shutters. Modifications in 1788 included the creation of storage spaces for the villagers.

=== Frescoes and recognition ===
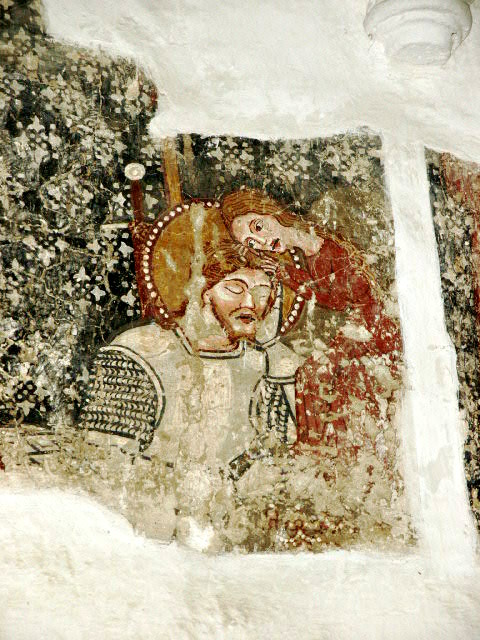
Fresco depicting Saint Ladislaus resting in the arms of a maiden

The church's interior features a partly destroyed but valuable series of mural paintings. These Gothic, Italian Renaissance-influenced works were executed in 1419 by Paul of Ung; the most detailed is a Conversion of Paul the Apostle that includes the artist's portrait. There and in The Pursuit of the Cuman, part of a Saint Ladislaus legend group, Paul managed to integrate the subject into the composition's other elements. Other subjects he painted were the Martyrdom of the Ten Thousand and several saint-bishops. Beneath his portrait, in Gothic minuscule, he wrote a love declaration in Latin: "This work did master Paul, son of Stephen of Ung, paint and prepare, AD 1419; he wrote this inscription while keeping in mind a beautiful girl". The damage to the frescoes occurred when the arches were built and later, in the 17th century, when a pulpit was installed.

In 1999, Dârjiu, together with five other places, was added to the already-listed Biertan to form the villages with fortified churches in Transylvania UNESCO World Heritage Site. Additionally, the church is listed as a historic monument by Romania's Ministry of Culture and Religious Affairs, with the fortifications being listed as a separate entry.

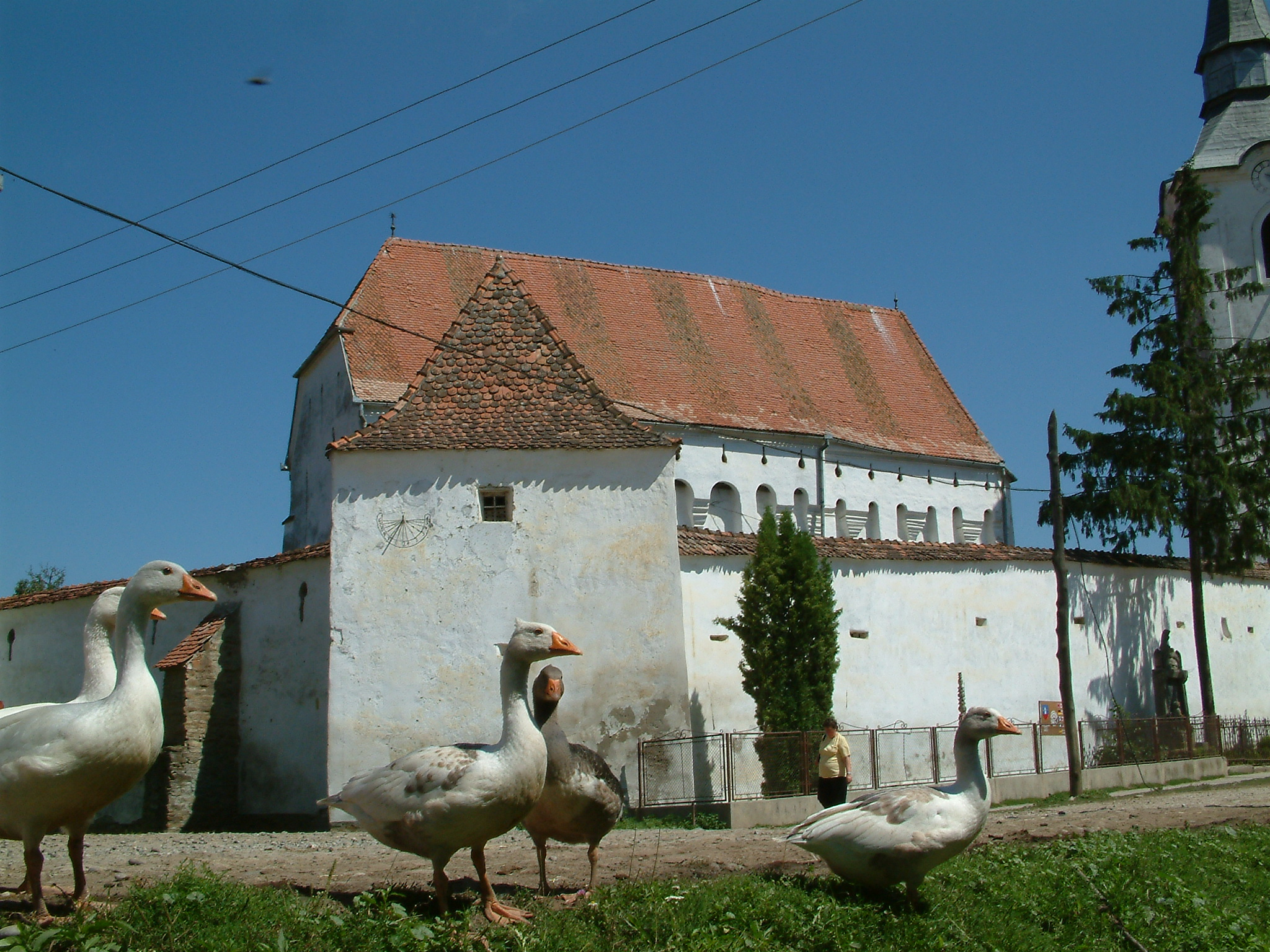
Exterior view

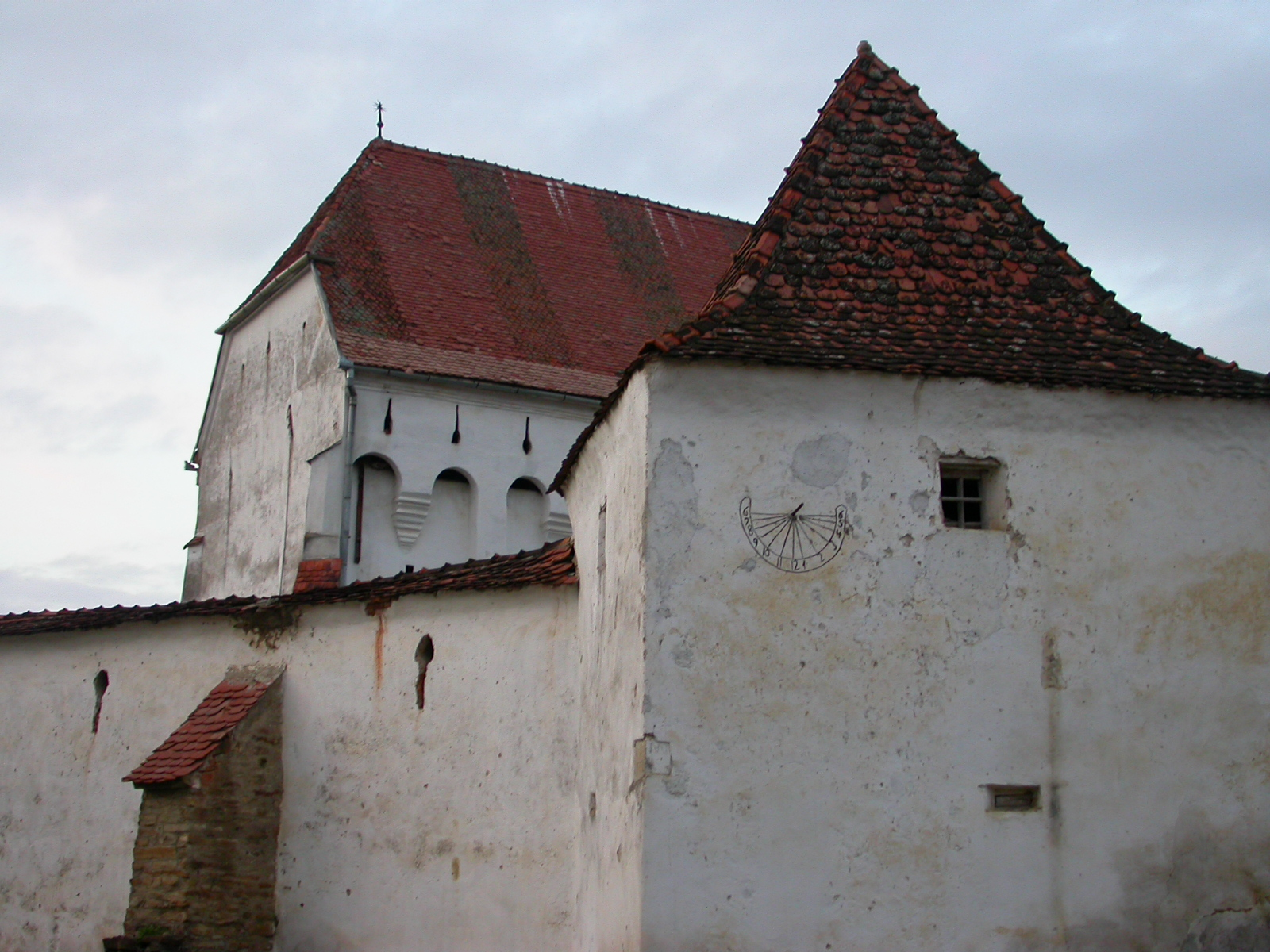
Another exterior view

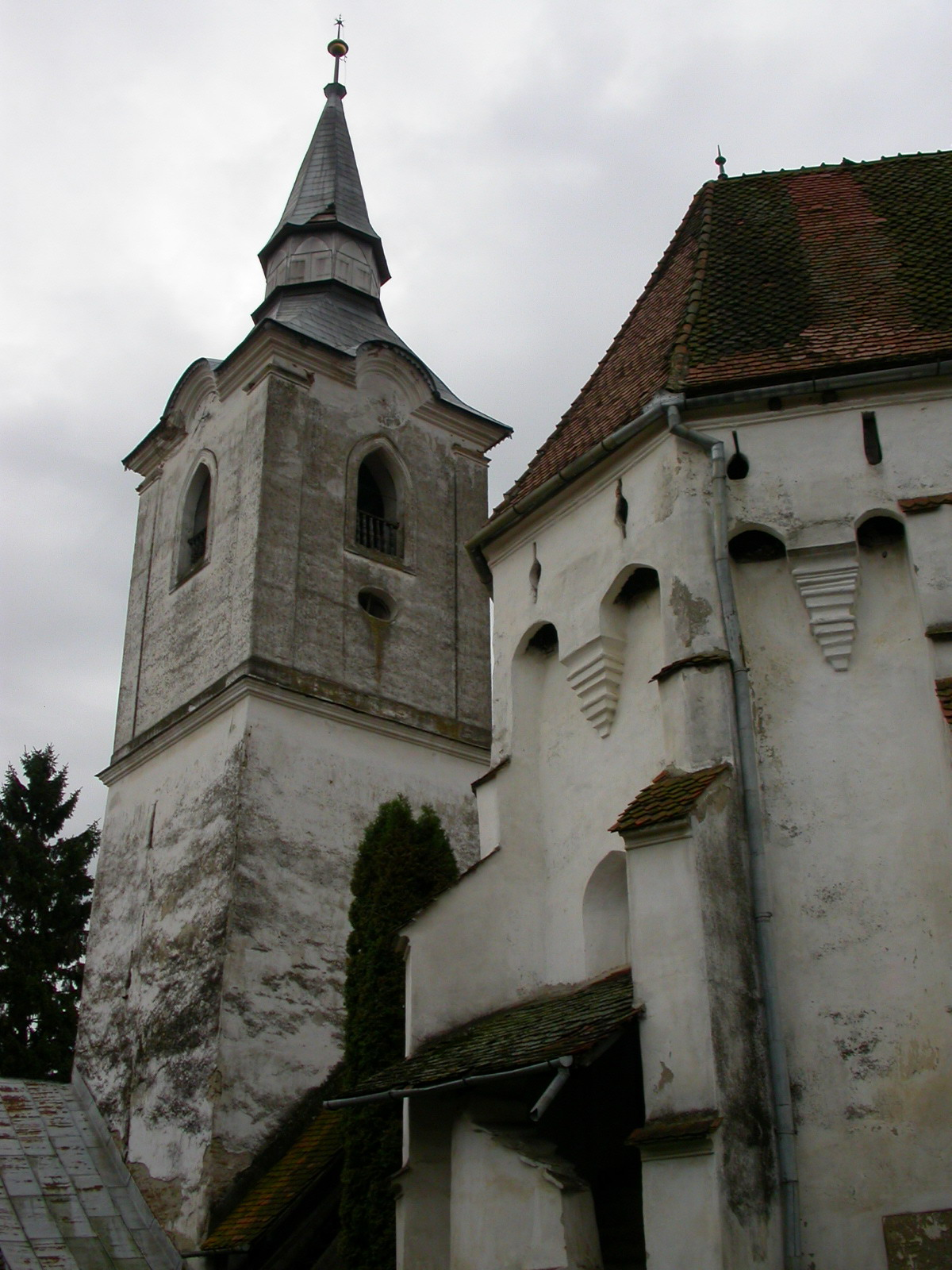
Tower

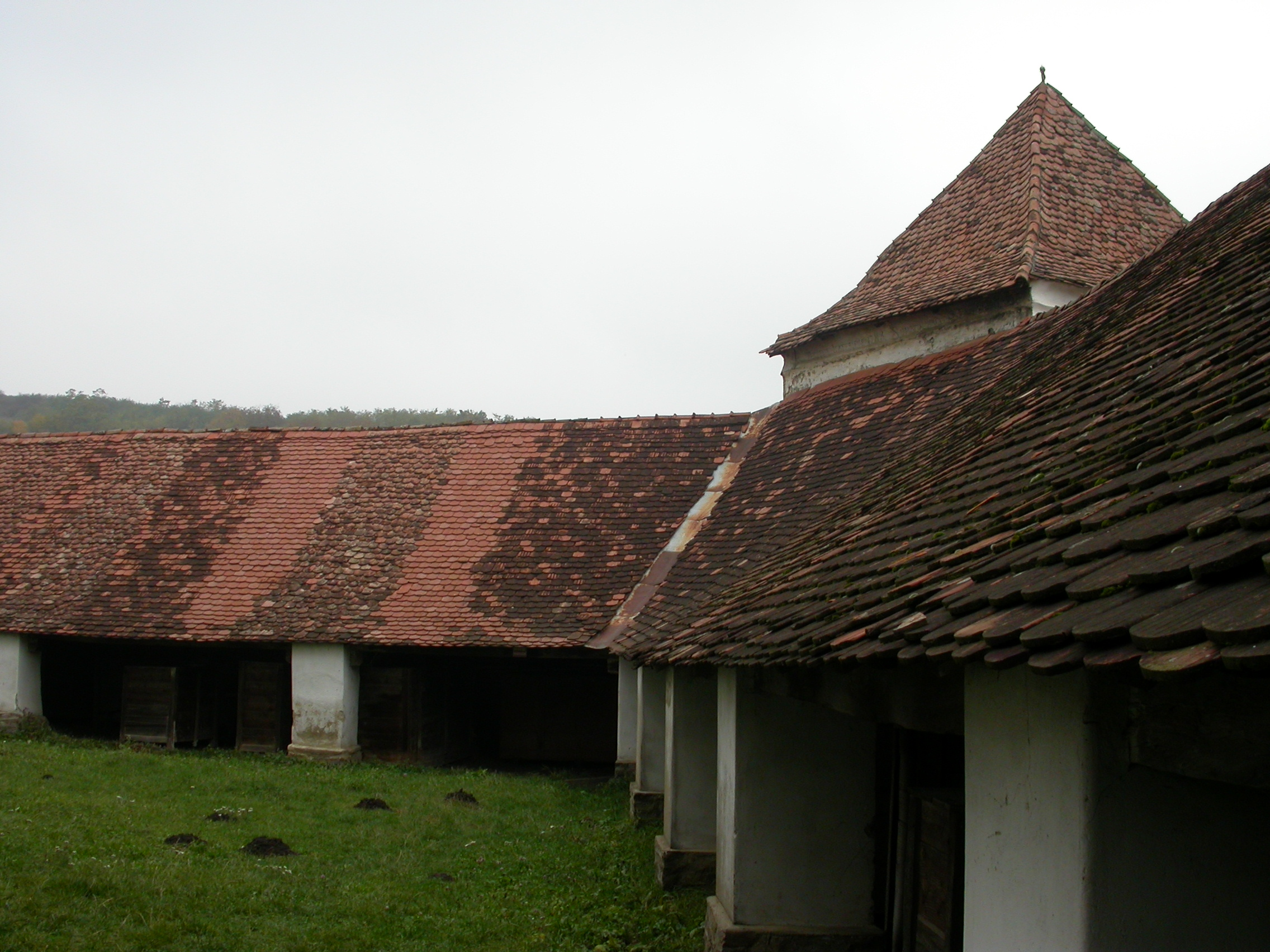
Fortifications from interior

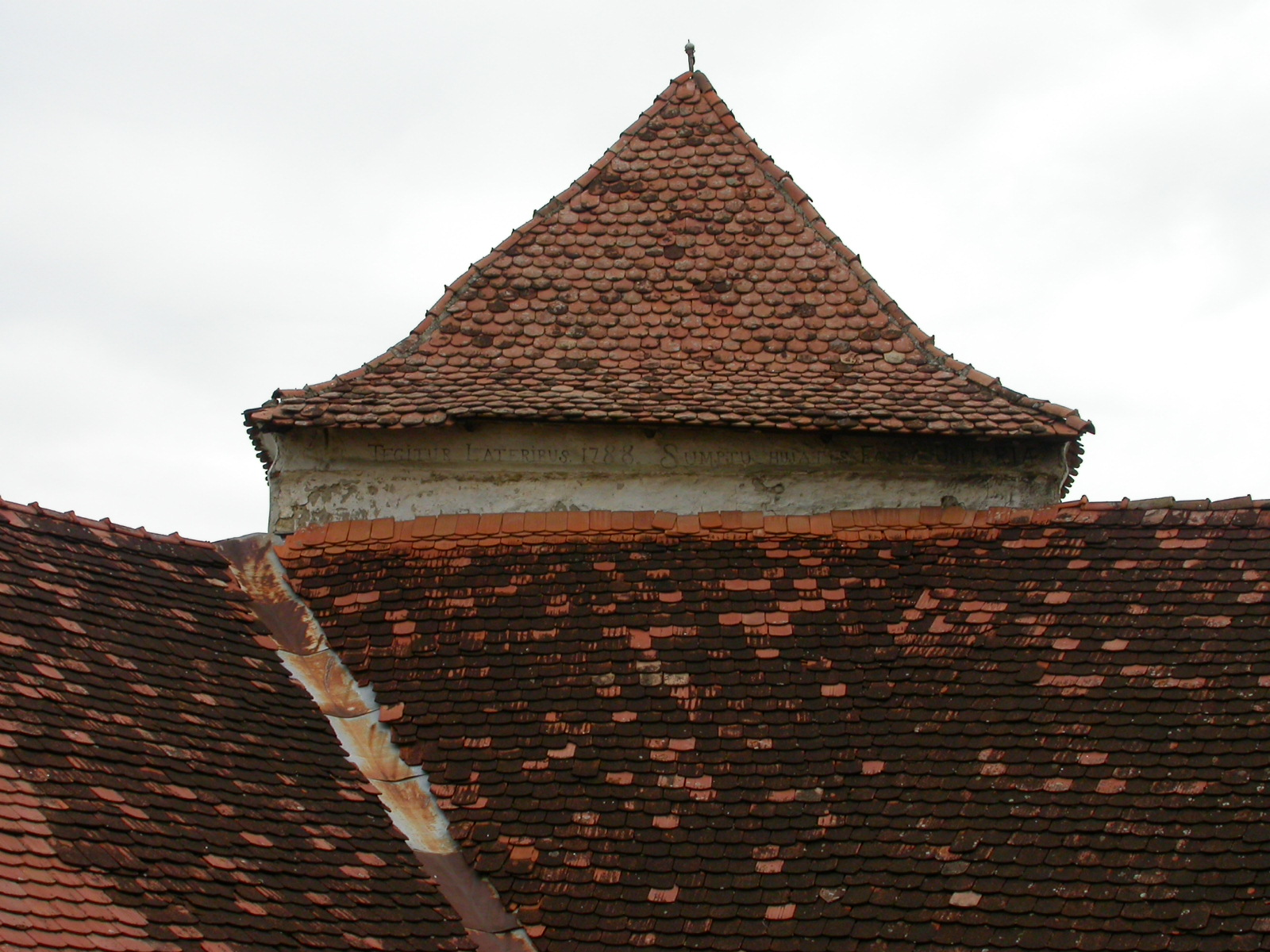
Bastion

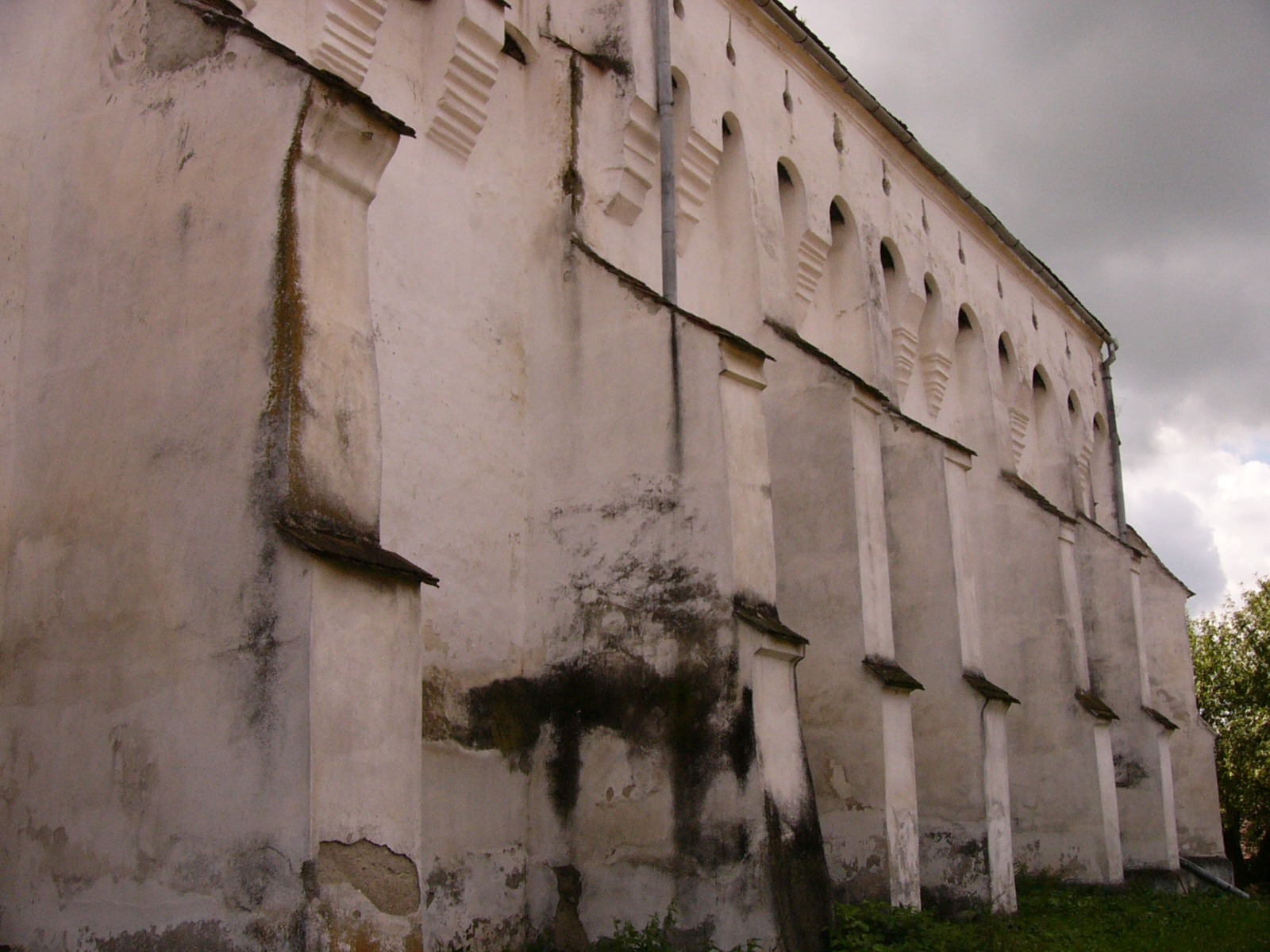
Church exterior detail

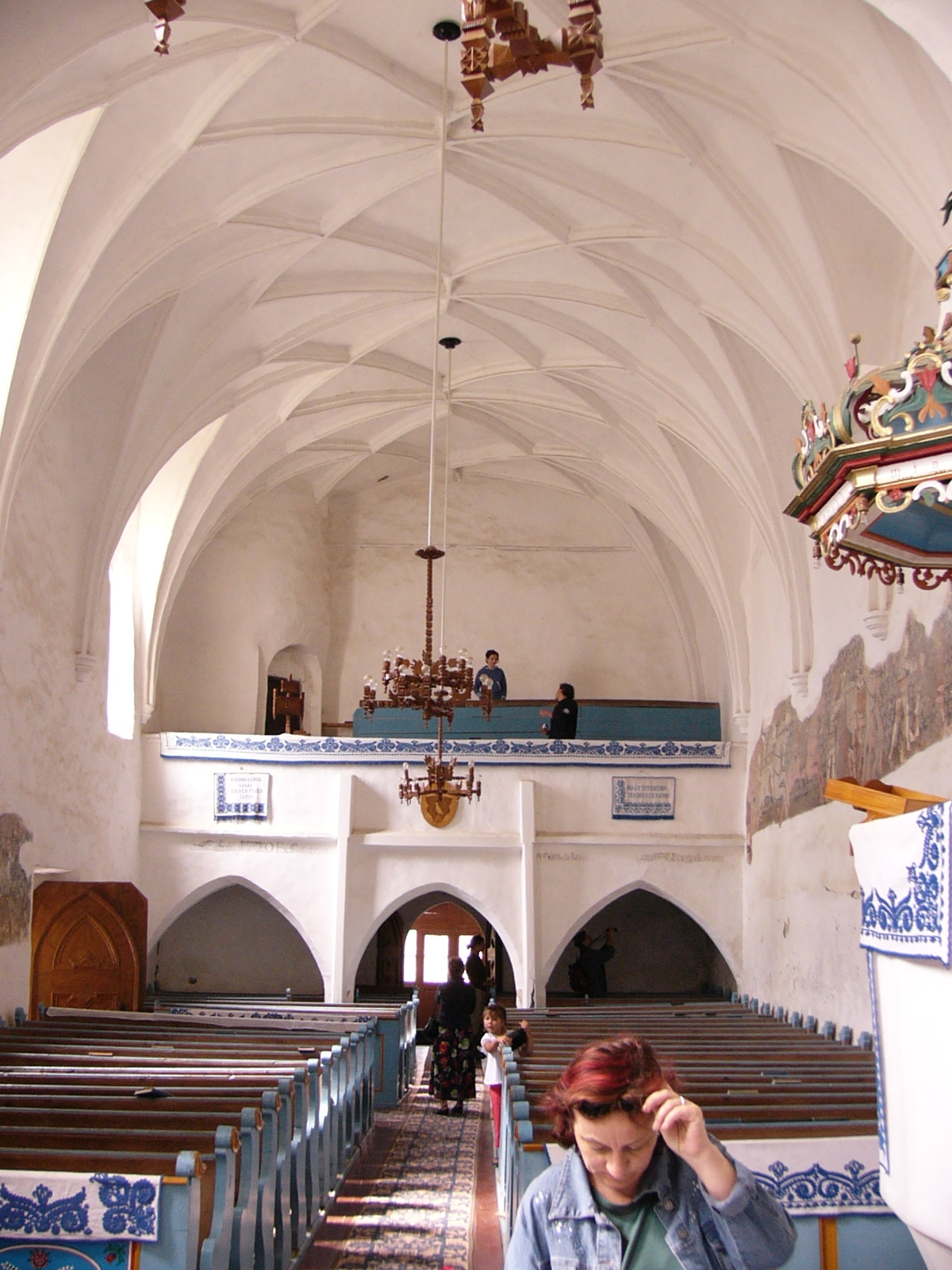
Church interior

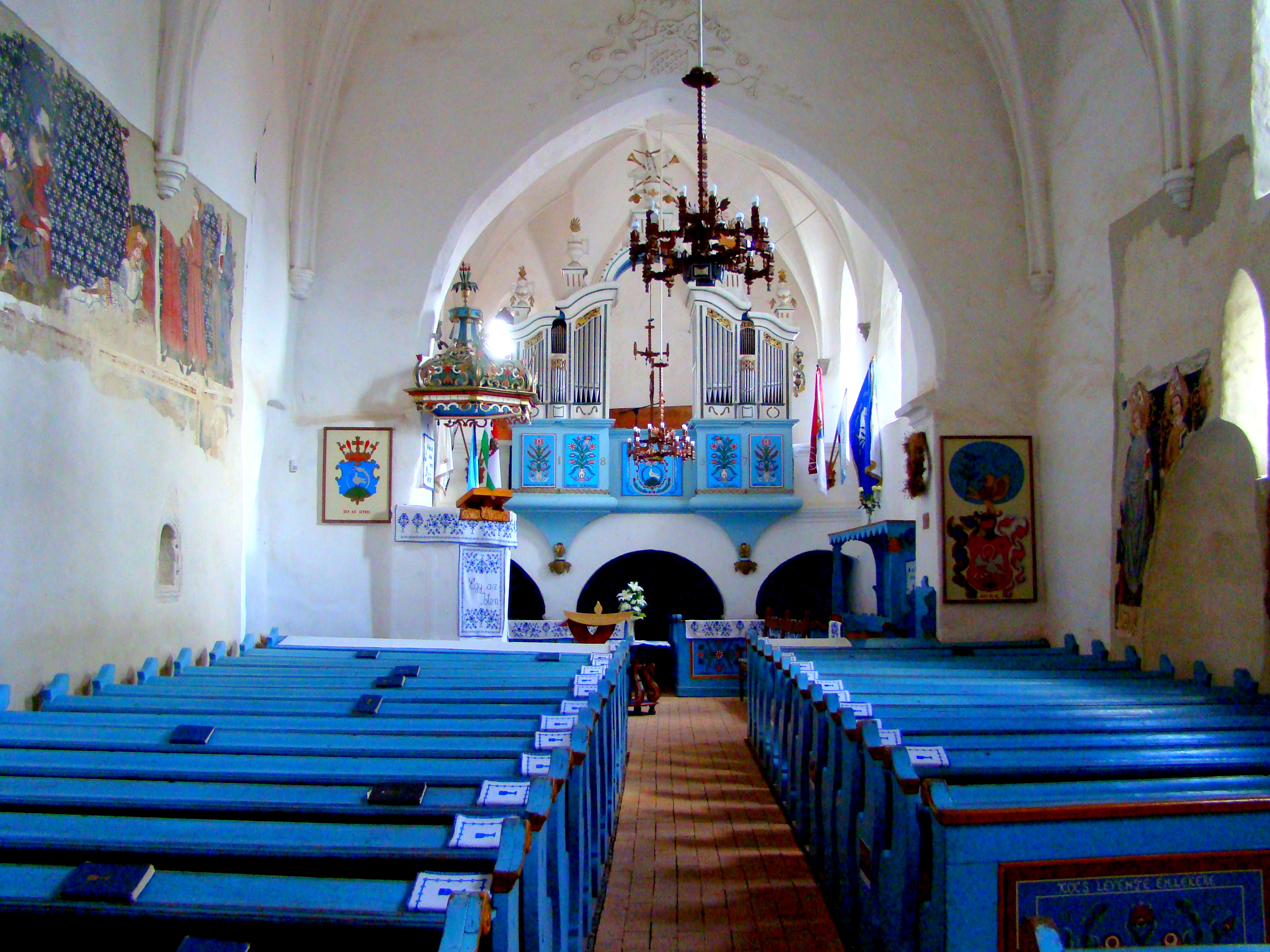
Altar

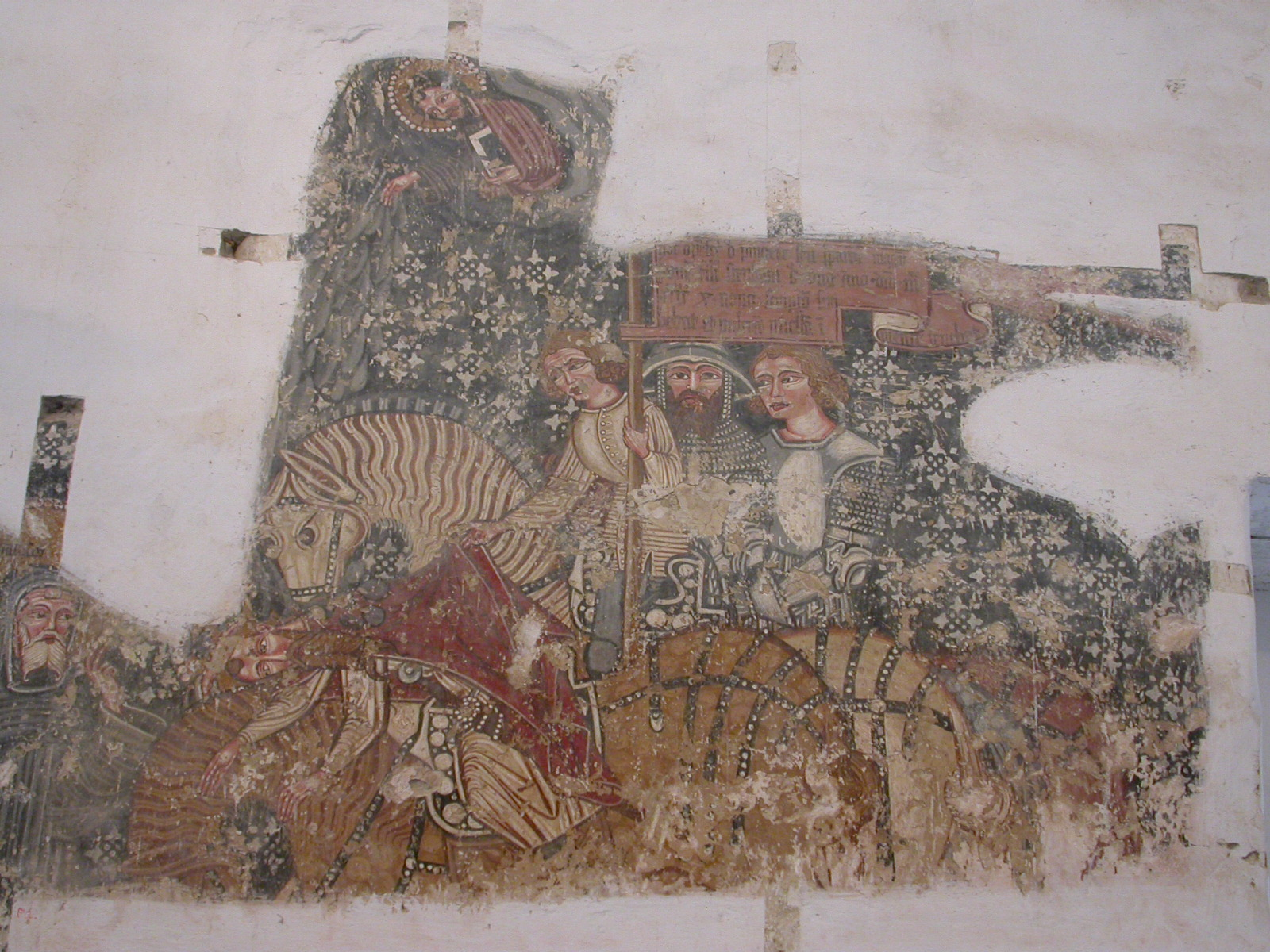
Saint Ladislaus mural
