= Church on the Hill (Sighișoara) =

Coordinates: 46°13′04″N 24°47′26″E

- Bergkirche (German); Biserica din Deal (Romanian)
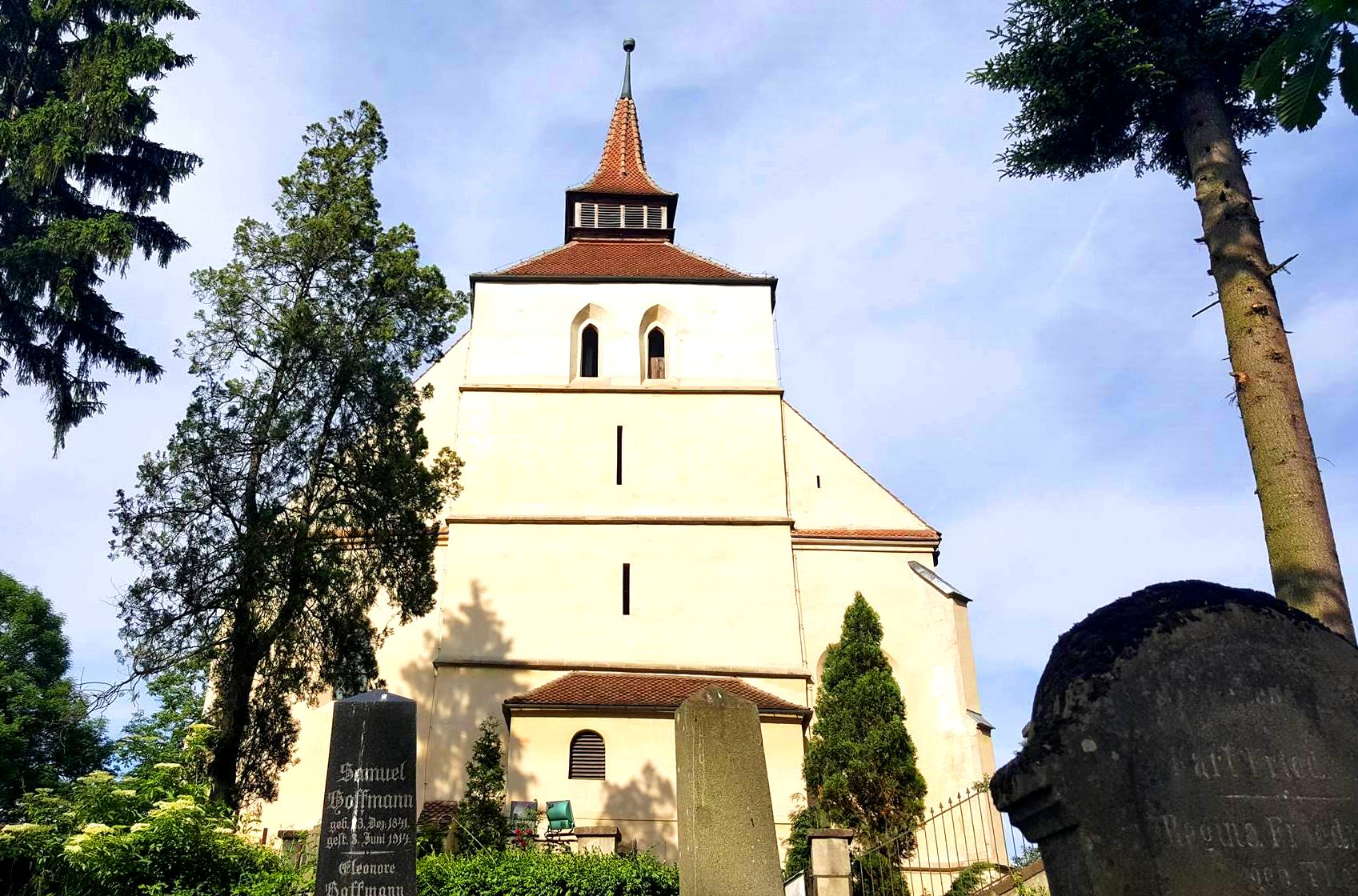
- Church on the Hill
- Location: Sighișoara
- Country: Romania
- Denomination: Lutheran
- Previous denomination: Catholic Church
- Religious institute: Evangelical Church of the Augsburg Confession

History
- Dedication: St Nicholas

Architecture
- Heritage designation: Monument istoric
- Style: Romanesque, Gothic
- Groundbreaking: 1429
- Completed: 1488

Monument istoric
- Official name: Biserica evanghelică „Din Deal”
- Reference no.: MS-II-m-A-15974

The Church on the Hill (Romanian: Biserica din Deal, German: Bergkirche) is an architecturally significant church located in Sighişoara, Mureș County in Romania. This church is the most important monument of religious architecture in Sighisoara and is one of the great churches of Transylvania, being the third largest. Located at an altitude of 429 meters, on the Hilltop School, the church dominates by its massiveness the entire city and it is visible from a great distance almost from all directions. Most researchers believe that a number of architectural details such as slightly misaligned position of the bell-tower and choir demonstrate an evolution in stages, over several centuries, in the construction of this church.

== Construction ==
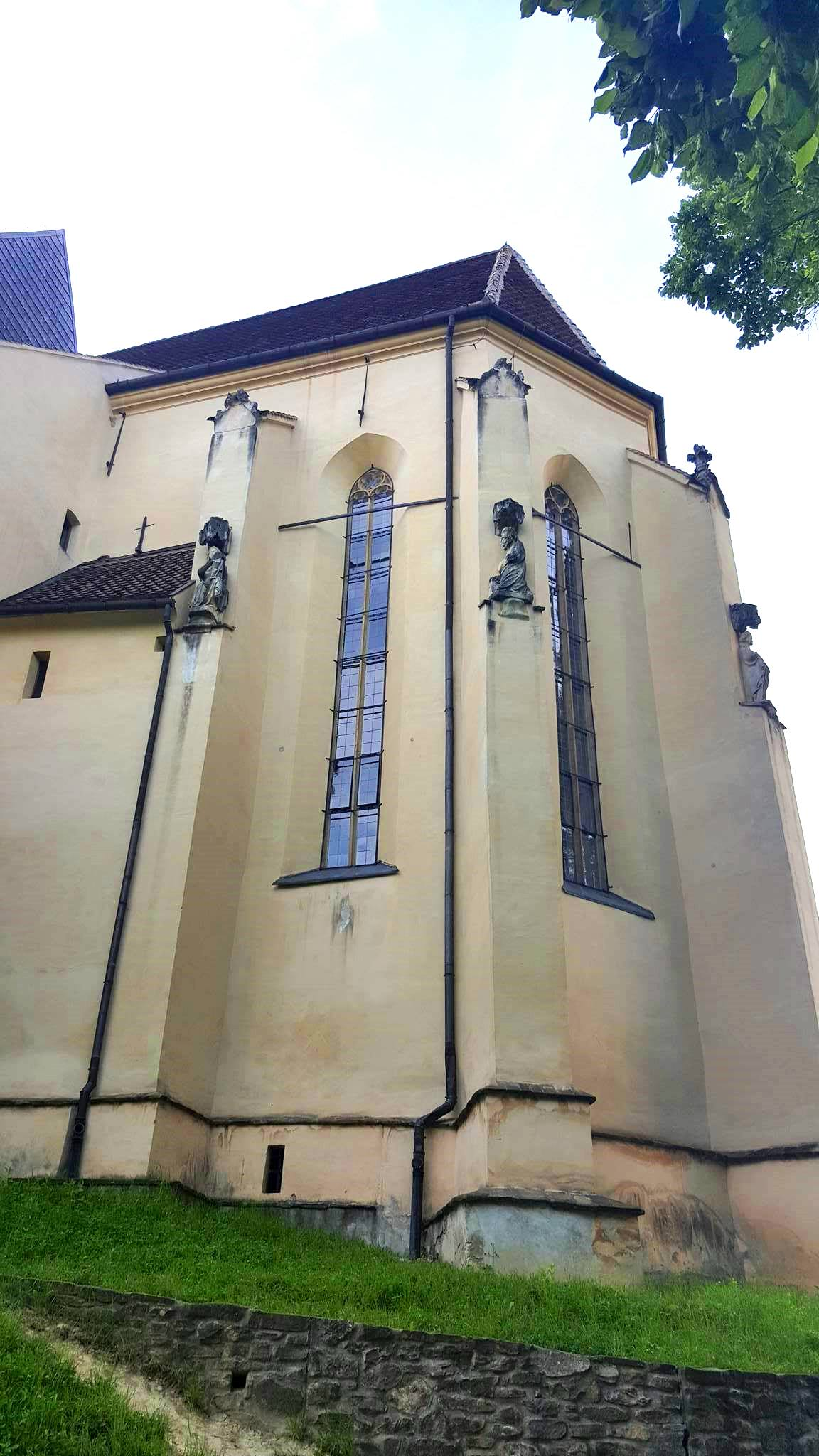
Exterior left wall

Unlike the late Gothic monuments in Western Europe, the Church on the Hill is characterized on the outside by simplicity, especially since most Saxon churches were fortified and could not afford richer ornamentation of the exterior. In Transylvania, the transformation of the old Romanesque churches into Gothic churches took place between the fourteenth and fifteenth centuries, under the direct influence of the German school of architecture. Soon after the year 1400 a number of builders and craftsmen stonemasons of German origins began to spread new type of church-hall, substantially modifying old buildings. An inscription in stone tells us that the work began in 1429 and would be completed in 1488 under the patronage of St. Nicolae, but a number of development works continued in the following decades. The evolution of this monument was marked further on by two serious events. The first took place during the Hungarian siege in 1704 when the roof and the belfry were burned and the big bells collapsed. The other unfortunate event was the earthquake of 1838, when the choir vaults entirely collapsed and were later replaced with imitations in wood.

The interior of the church is the direct consequence of the restorations in 1934, when a team composed by Gustav Binder, Gertrud Kroner, J. Misselbacher and F. Muller revealed the old frescoes that were covered with lime back in 1776. At that time the altar was decorated with four wooden sculptures representing the four evangelists in natural size. In the past, the legend says, there must have been twelve disciples of Christ made of sheet silver in natural size but robbed in 1601 by Cossacks.

The exterior appearance of the church is due to restorations by Restauro Masserschmidt (1993–1999). During that time several changes inside the church occurred as well; by introducing a series of works of great artistic value and altars that were brought from others Saxon churches.

=== The Choir ===
Externally, this depicts Virgin Mary, sitting on a throne under a Gothic canopy lilies, with a victorious attitude, showing child Jesus sat upright on her left knee. The sacrament house is from the Late Middle Age.

=== The Interior ===
Inside the Church on the Hill you can find the only ancient crypt in Transylvania. This crypt was devastated several times in the past as thieves believed they would find valuables in the tombs belonging to the city leaders. Inside the church there are also some monumental wood pews. The pews are very high, with 14 seats and high back gate showing decorations with vegetal stalks and zoomorphic birds. Another main feature is the 60 sarcophagi near the entrance

This church was painted entirely inside and partially outside. Fragments that could be saved from interior painting are today considered among the most precious murals in Transylvania. These paintings belong to the 14th-16th centuries and are works of several masters of Gothic and Renaissance painting. On the north wall of the choir you can see Christ's Passion tools guarded by an angel with a few saints among whom stands St. Ursula and her arrow. Among the works inside the church you can find: St. George fighting the dragon represented in three scenes, Archangel Michael weighing a soul, The evangelist Matthew, Veil of Veronica with the image of Jesus carried by two angels, Mother of Jesus Christ and The Judgement.

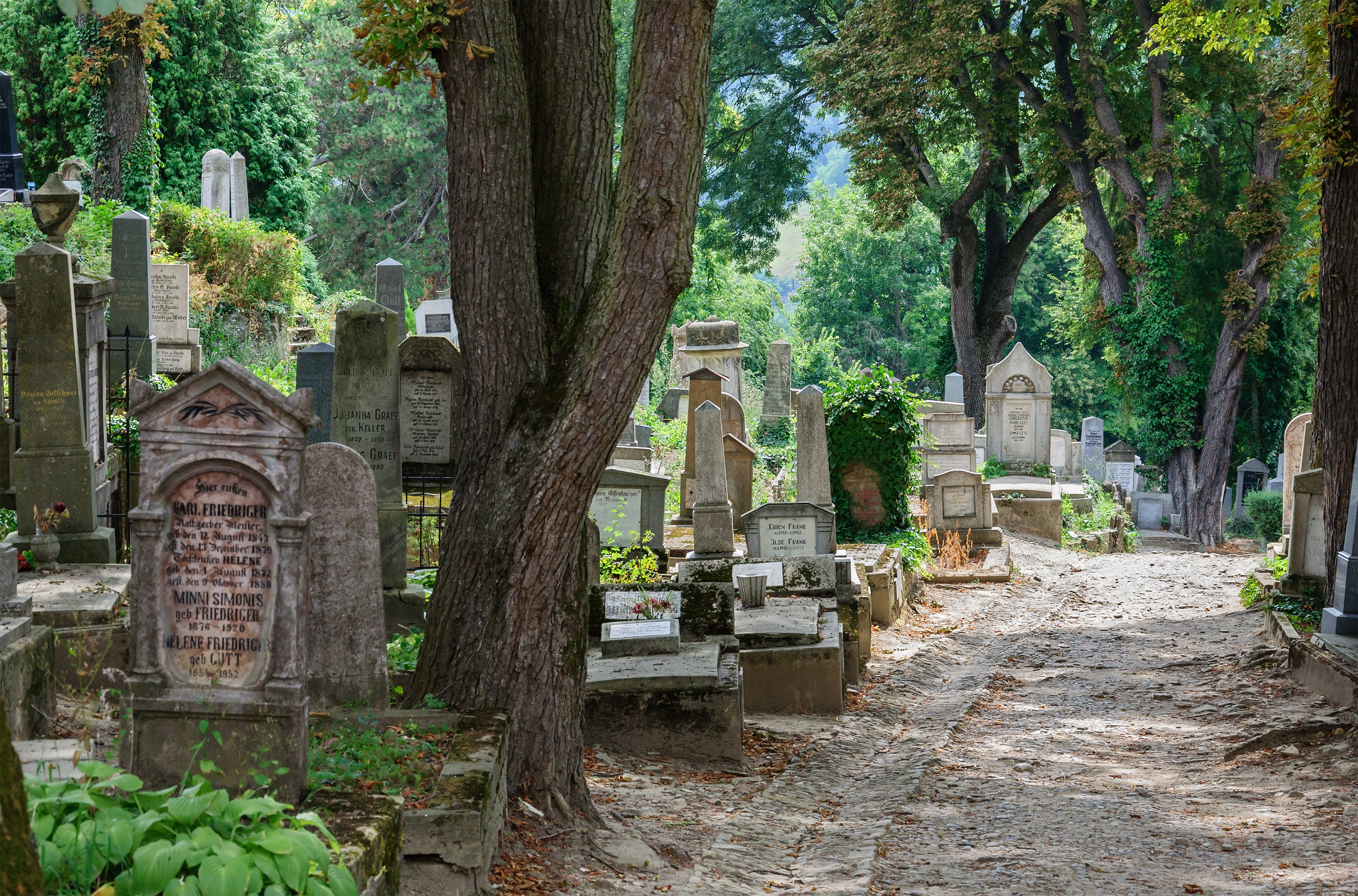

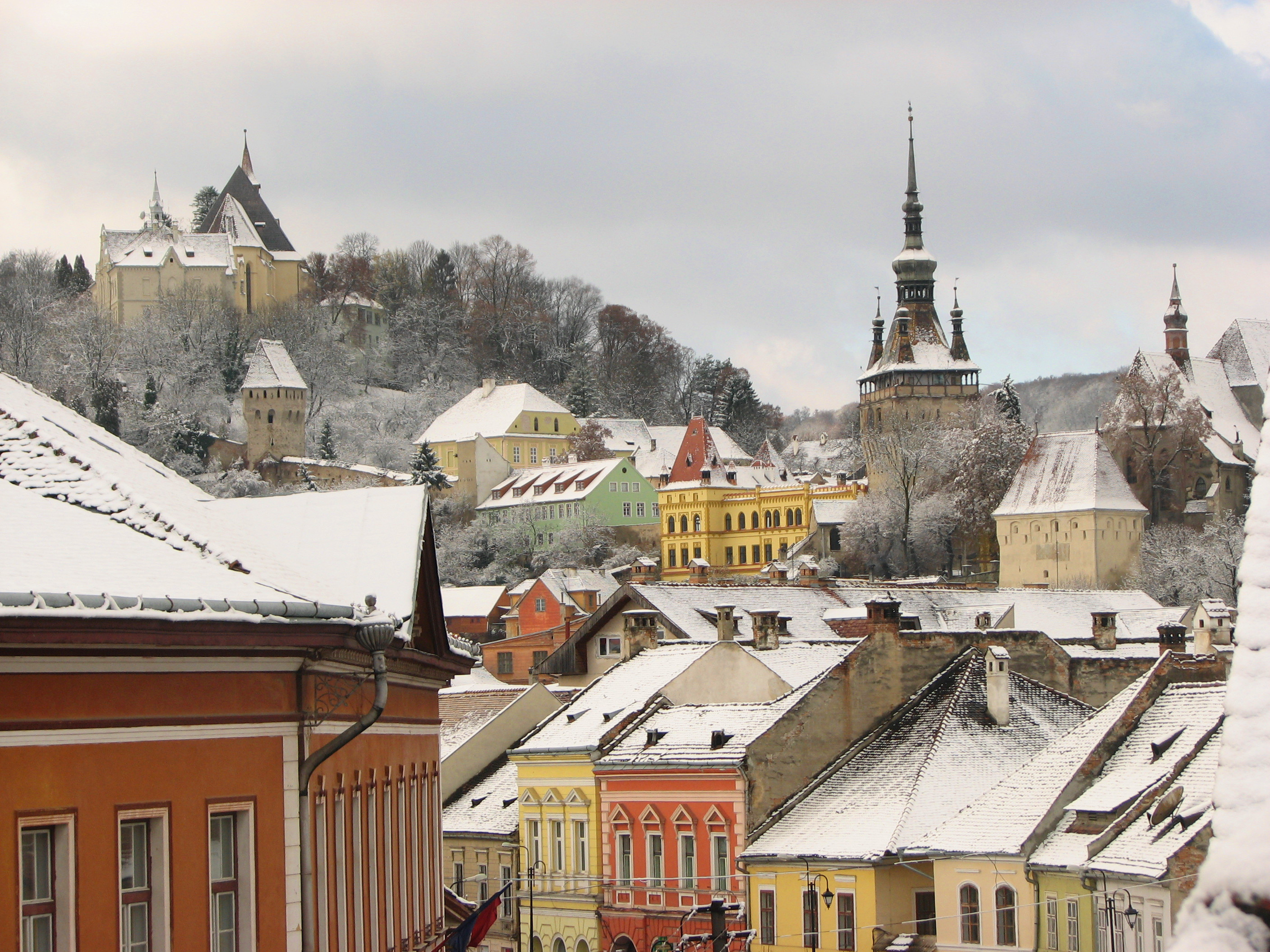

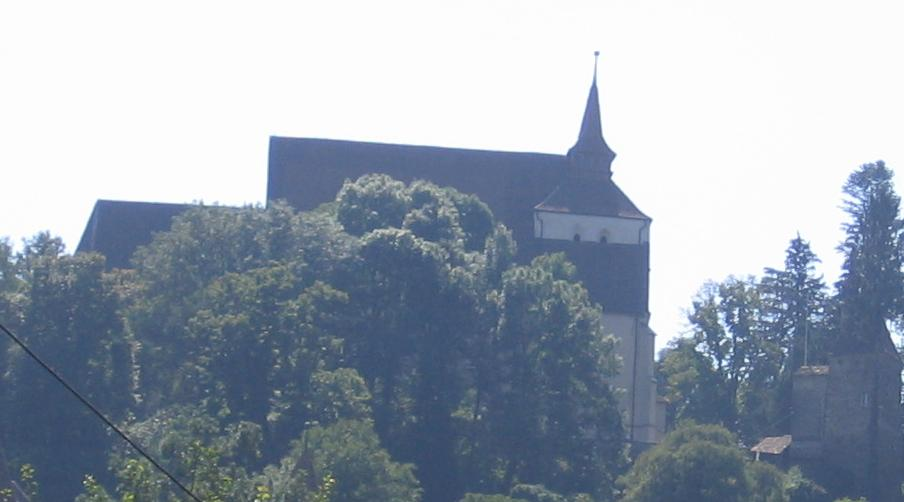

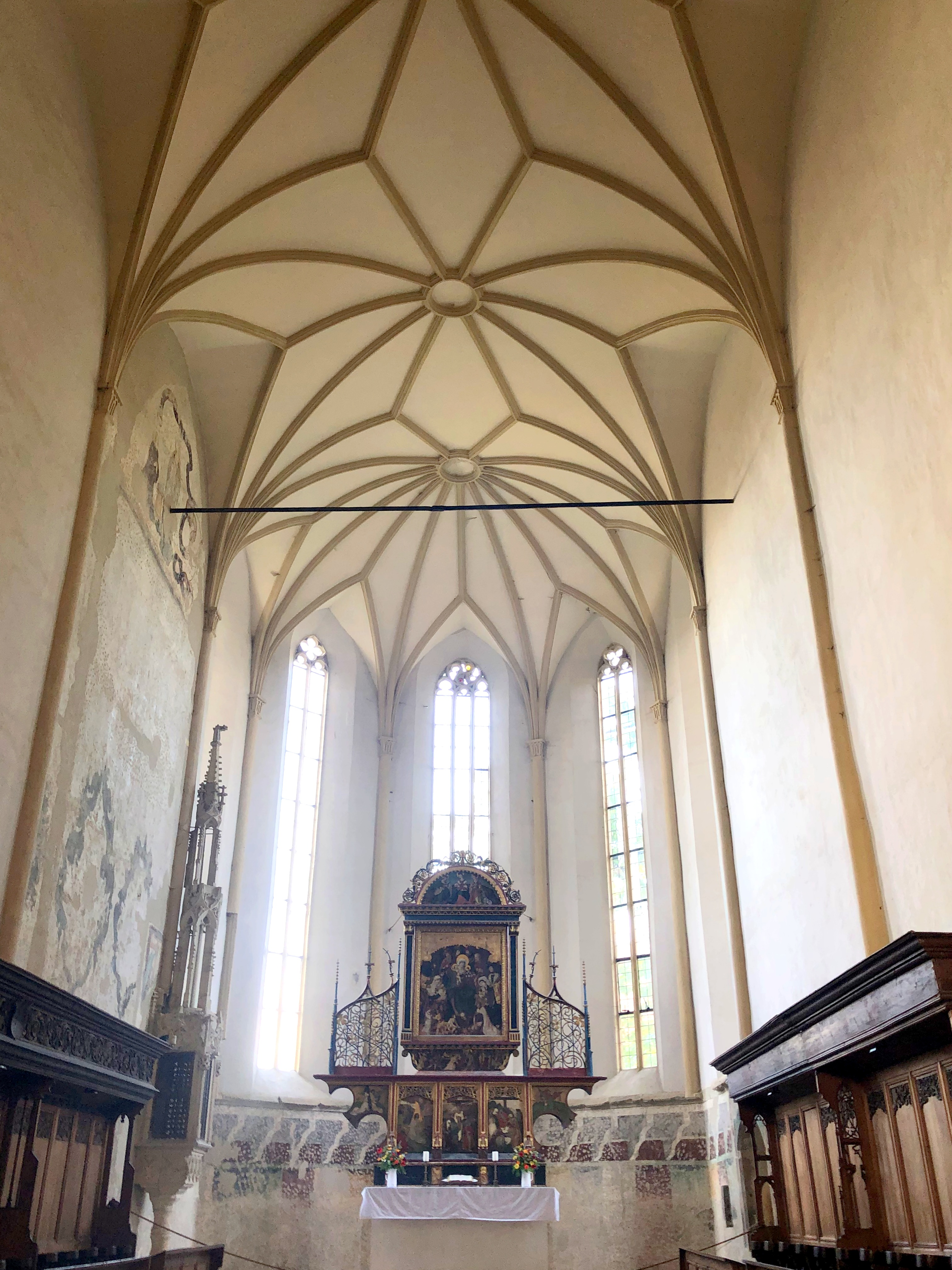

== See also ==
- Ghelința, St. Emeric Church, 13th-century murals
- Laslea, Mălâncrav church, early 14th- and 15th-century murals
- Dârjiu, church murals from 1419
