= Ghelința =

Ghelința Gelence
- Commune
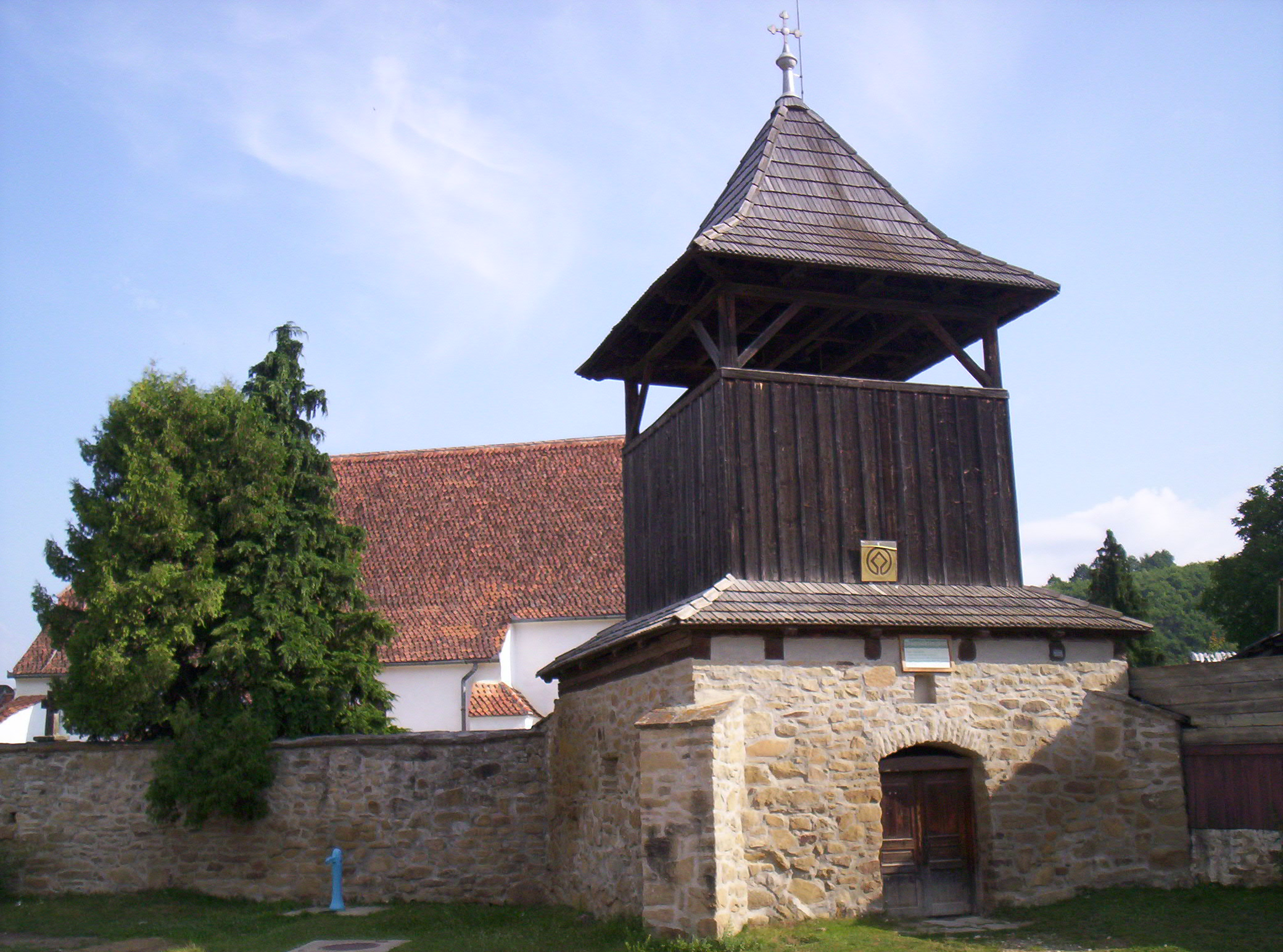
- Saint Emeric Church

- Coat of arms

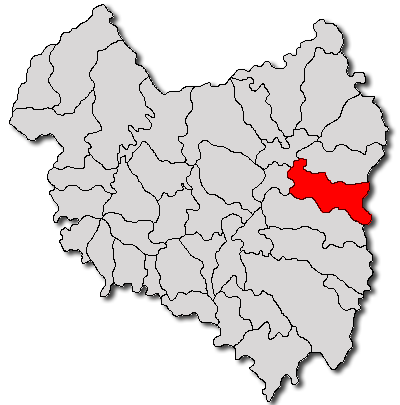
- Location in Covasna County

- Location in Romania
- Coordinates: 45°57′N 26°14′E
- Country: Romania
- County: Covasna

Government
  - Mayor (2020–2024): Botond-János Ilyés (UDMR)
- Area: 110 km^{2} (42 sq mi)
- Elevation: 600 m (2,000 ft)
- Population (2021-12-01): 4,917
  - Density: 45/km^{2} (120/sq mi)
- Time zone: UTC+02:00 (EET)
  - Summer (DST): UTC+03:00 (EEST)
- Postal code: 527090
- Area code: (+40) 02 67
- Vehicle reg.: CV
- Website: www.gelence.info

Ghelința (Hungarian: Gelence, [ˈɡɛlɛntsɛ]; German: Gälänz) is a commune in Covasna County, Transylvania, Romania. It is composed of two villages, Ghelința and Harale (Haraly).

It formed part of the Székely Land, ethno-cultural region of the historical Transylvania province.

== Demographics ==
Historical population
Year	Pop.	±%
1850	2,846	—
1920	3,781	+32.9%
1941	4,152	+9.8%
1992	4,654	+12.1%
2002	4,774	+2.6%
2011	4,815	+0.9%
2021	4,917	+2.1%
Source: Census data

The commune has an absolute Székely Hungarian majority. At the 2002 census, it had a population of 4,774, of which 98.49% or 4,702 were Székely Hungarian. At the 2021 census, Ghelința had a population of 4,917; of those, 92.03% were Hungarians and 3.72% Roma.

== Tourist attraction ==
The St. Emeric Catholic Church with its 13th century murals is the main tourist attraction of the village.

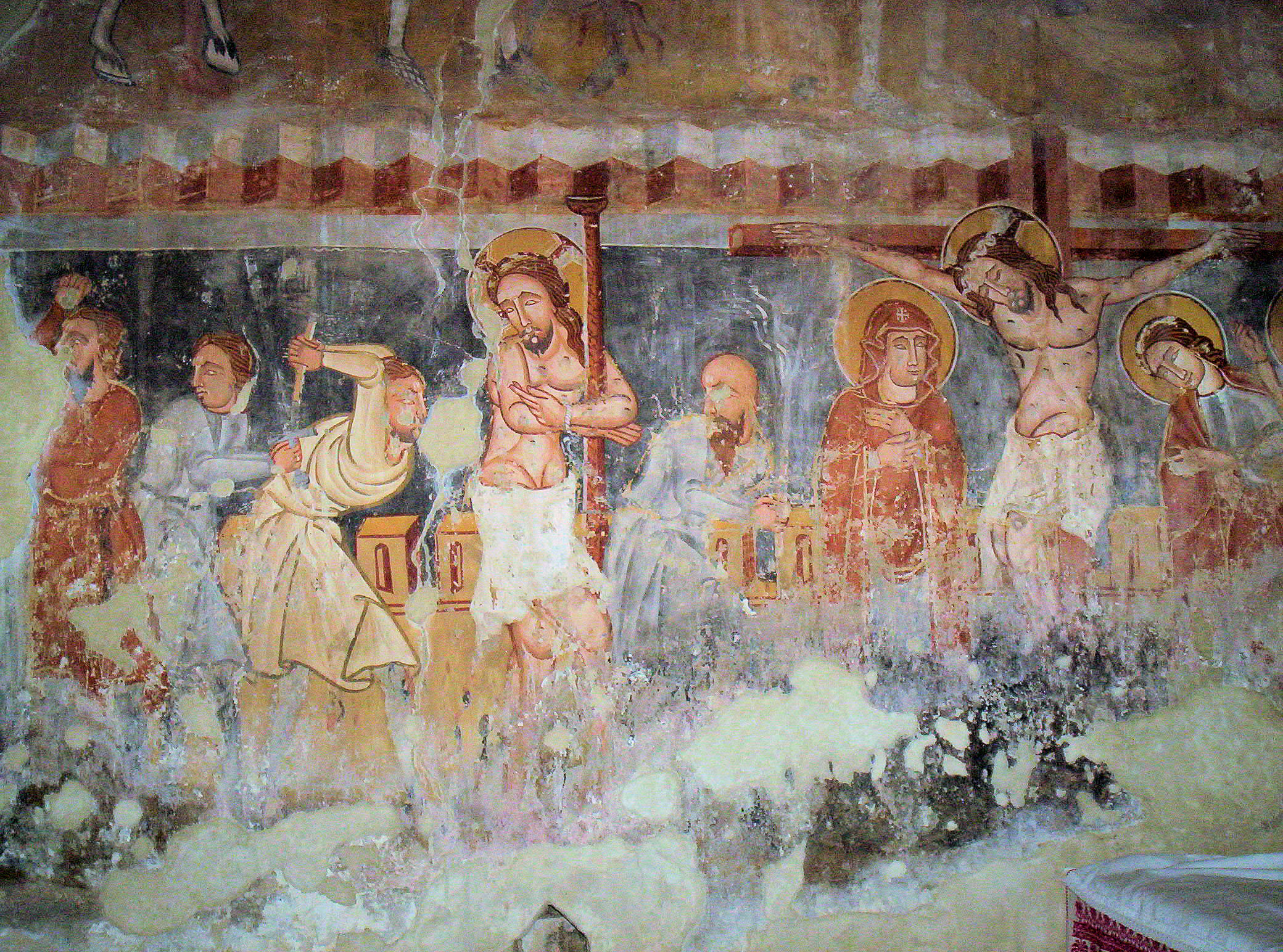
13th century mural
St. Emeric Church

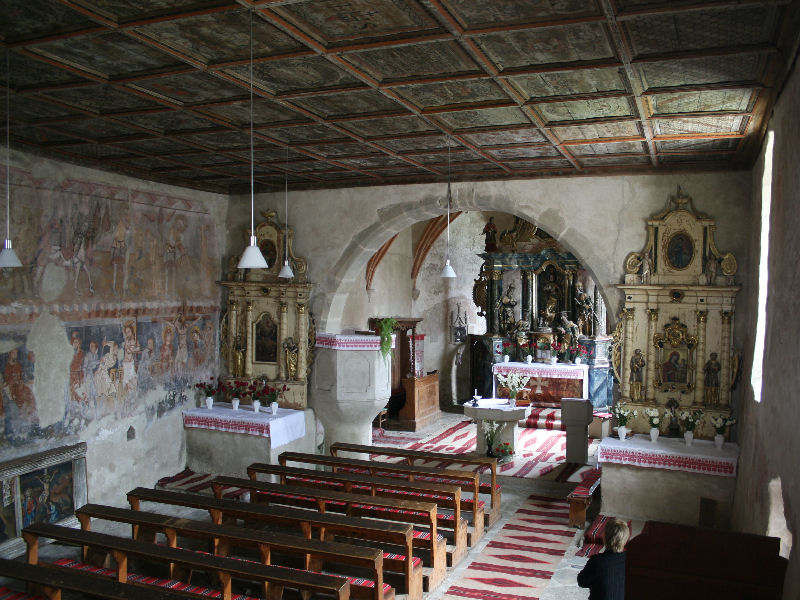
Interior
St. Emeric Church

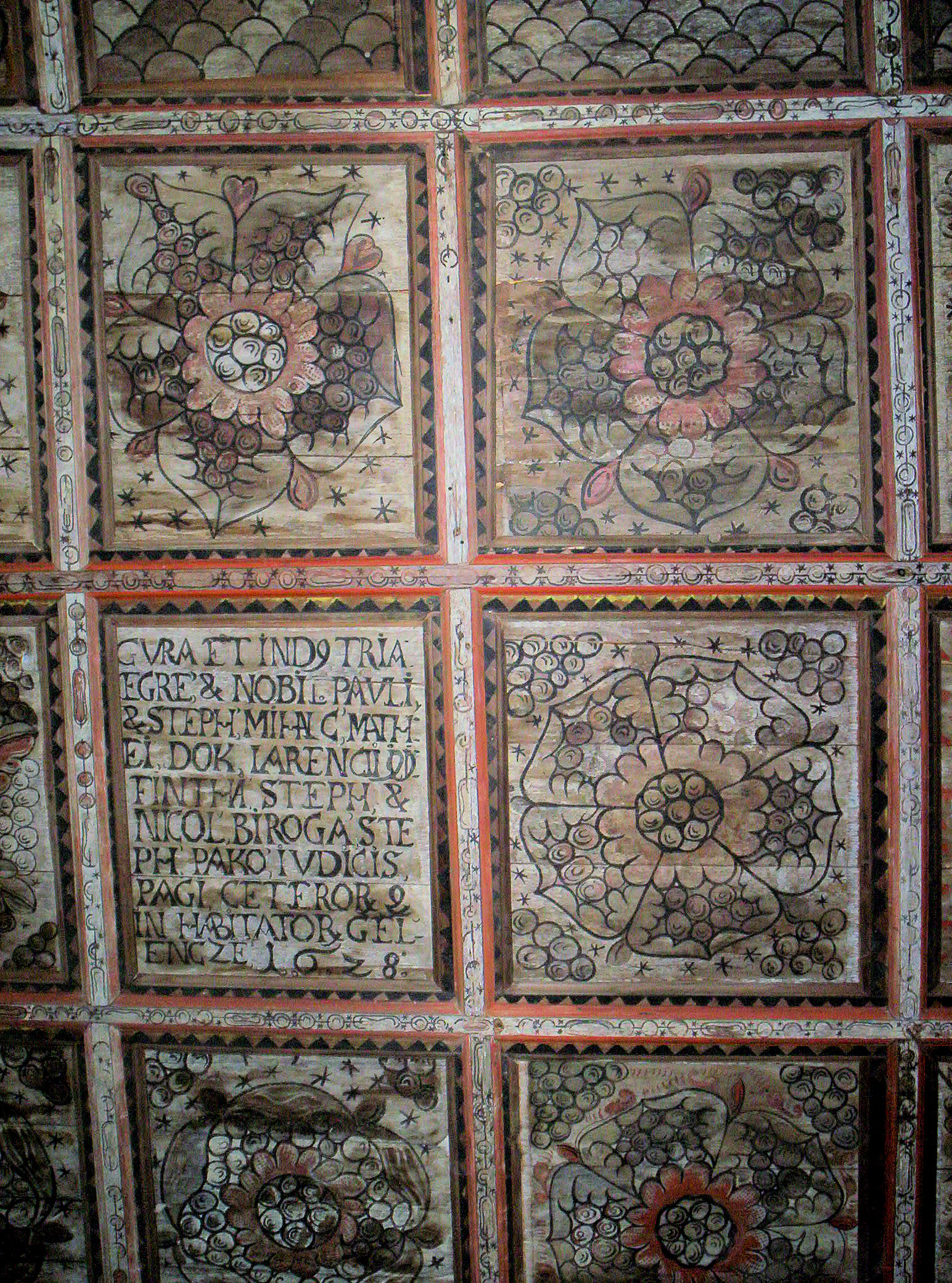
Ceiling panels
St. Emeric Church

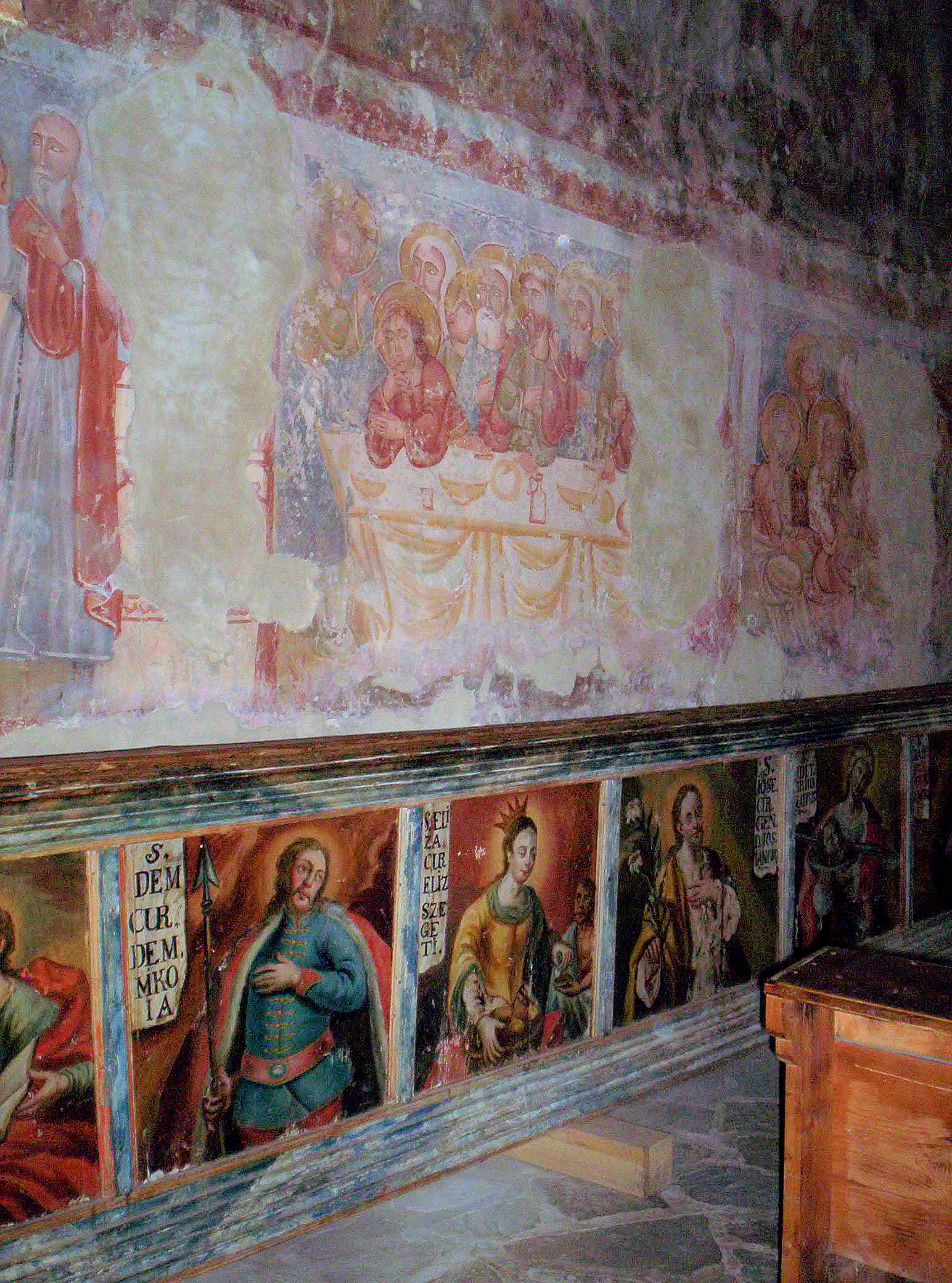
Mural
St. Emeric Church

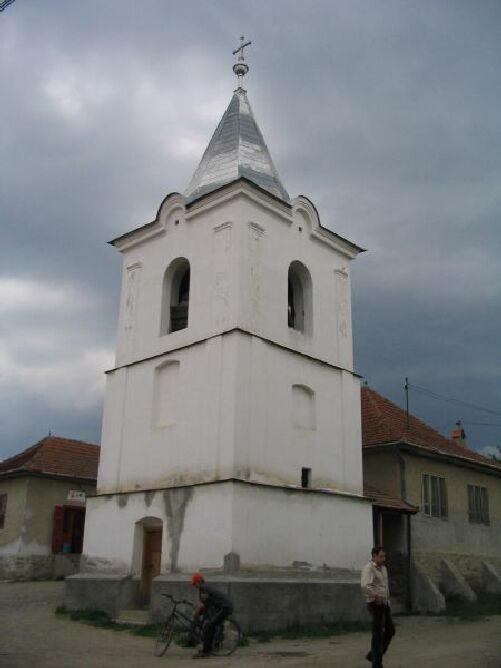
Harale Catholic Church

== See also ==
- Laslea, Mălâncrav church: early 14th- and 15th-century murals
- Church on the Hill (Sighișoara), 14th-16th century murals
- Dârjiu, church murals from 1419
