= Dârjiu =

Dârjiu Székelyderzs
- Commune
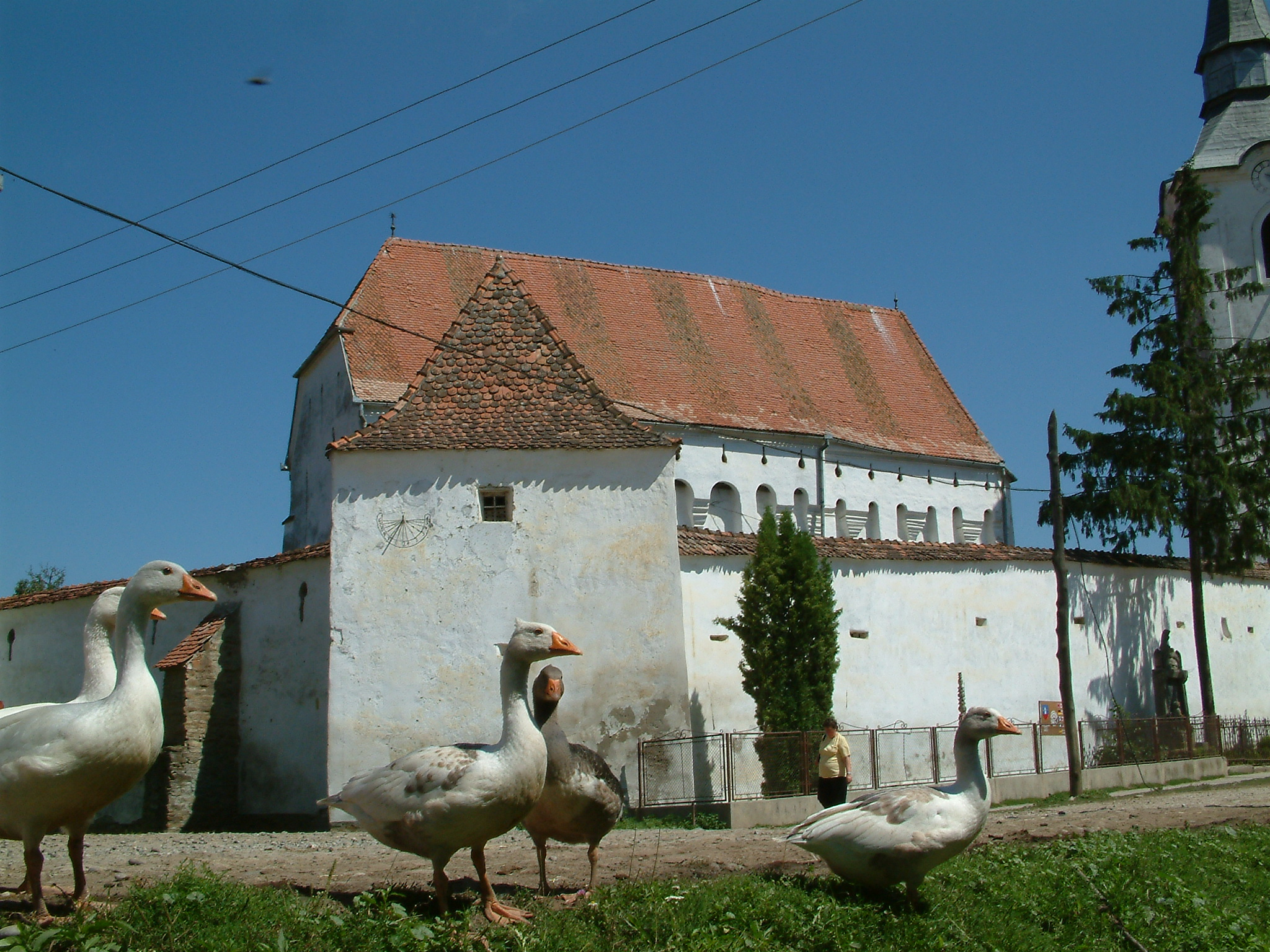
- 13th Century UNESCO World Heritage fortified Unitarian Church, and some geese

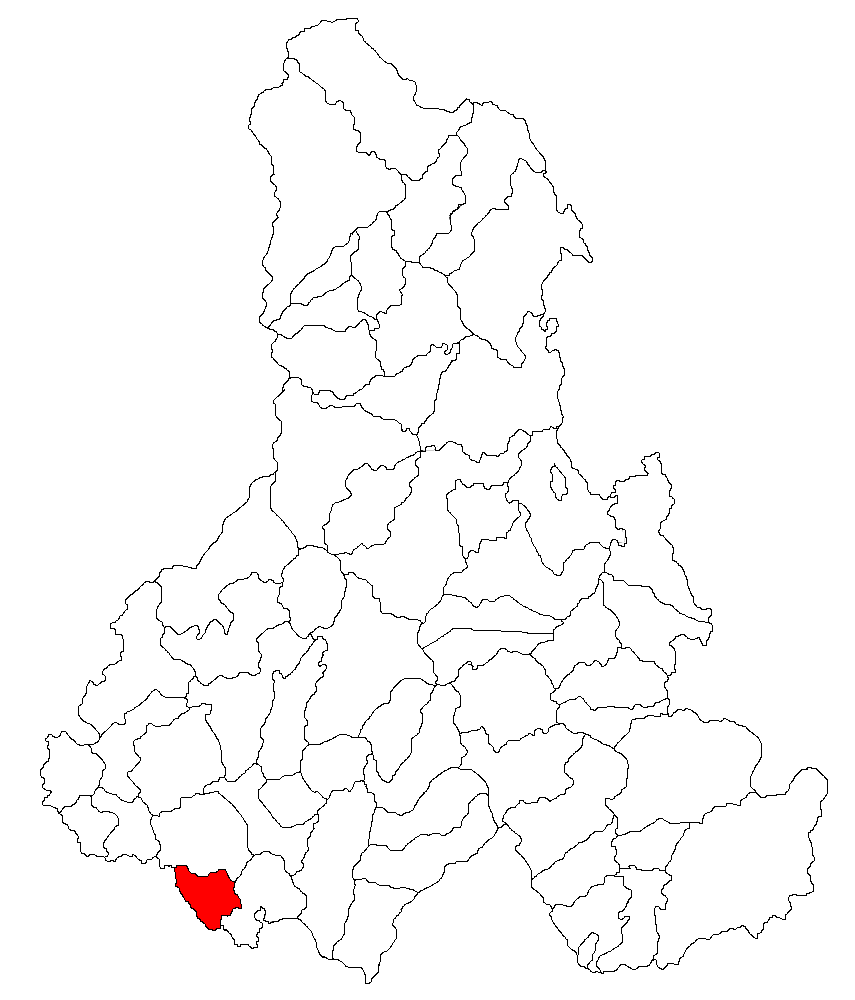
- Location in Harghita County

- Location in Romania
- Coordinates: 46°12′N 25°12′E
- Country: Romania
- County: Harghita

Government
  - Mayor (2020–2024): Adrián István (UDMR)
- Area: 41.96 km^{2} (16.20 sq mi)
- Elevation: 555 m (1,821 ft)
- Population (2021-12-01): 851
  - Density: 20.3/km^{2} (52.5/sq mi)
- Time zone: UTC+02:00 (EET)
  - Summer (DST): UTC+03:00 (EEST)
- Postal code: 537075
- Area code: (+40) 0266
- Vehicle reg.: HR
- Website: szekelyderzs.com

Dârjiu (Hungarian: Székelyderzs, Hungarian pronunciation: [ˈseːkɛjdɛrʒ]) is a commune in Harghita County, Romania. It lies in the Székely Land, an ethno-cultural region in eastern Transylvania. The commune is composed of two villages, Dârjiu (Székelyderzs) and Mujna (Székelymuzsna), both of which are on the route of the Via Transilvanica long-distance trail.

== Name ==
The Hungarian name Székelyderzs was first mentioned as "De ers" in a papal list of tithes taken in 1334. In 1525, it was recorded as Ders, while in 1760, it was already mentioned by its modern Hungarian name of Székely Derzs. The name Derzs is thought to be from the Old Bulgar.

== Demographics ==
At the 2011 census, the commune had a population of 1,036, of which 91.51% were Hungarians, 5.69% Roma, and 1.35% Romanians; 60.62% of the inhabitants were Unitarian, 20.46% Reformed, 7.34% Roman Catholic, 3.96% Baptists, and 1.83% Romanian Orthodox. At the 2021 census, Dârjiu had a population of 851; of those, 92.6% were Hungarians and 1.41% Romanians.

== History ==
Unitariansm was an official religion in Transylvania from the 1583 Medgyes (Mediaş) parliament. The first bishop was Ferenc Dávid, a local Hungarian-speaking Saxon. The first appointed ruler of Transylvania was the Unitarian John II Sigismund Zápolya, son of the Hungarian king John Zápolya (1526–1541).

The villages were historically part of the Székely Land region of Transylvania province. They belonged to Udvarhelyszék district until the administrative reform of Transylvania in 1876, when they fell within the Udvarhely County in the Kingdom of Hungary. After the Hungarian–Romanian War of 1919 and the Treaty of Trianon of 1920, they became part of the Kingdom of Romania and fell within plasa Odorhei of Odorhei County during the interwar period. In 1940, the second Vienna Award granted the Northern Transylvania to Hungary and the villages were held by Hungary until September 1944, when Romanian and Soviet troops regained control during World War II. After a brief Soviet occupation, the Romanian administration returned in March 1945. Between 1952 and 1960, the commune fell within the Magyar Autonomous Region, between 1960 and 1968 the Mureș-Magyar Autonomous Region. In 1968, the region was abolished, and since then, the commune has been part of Harghita County.

== Heartland of Unitarianism ==
Between 80,000 and 100,000 Unitarians live in the geographical region of Transylvania, mostly between Sighișoara and Odorheiu Secuiesc, more or less around Dârjiu. Further east, Hungarians are Roman Catholics with Calvinist enclaves, e.g., in the former Háromszék County, while the former Csík County is solidly Roman Catholic.

== Fortified church; mural art in the region ==
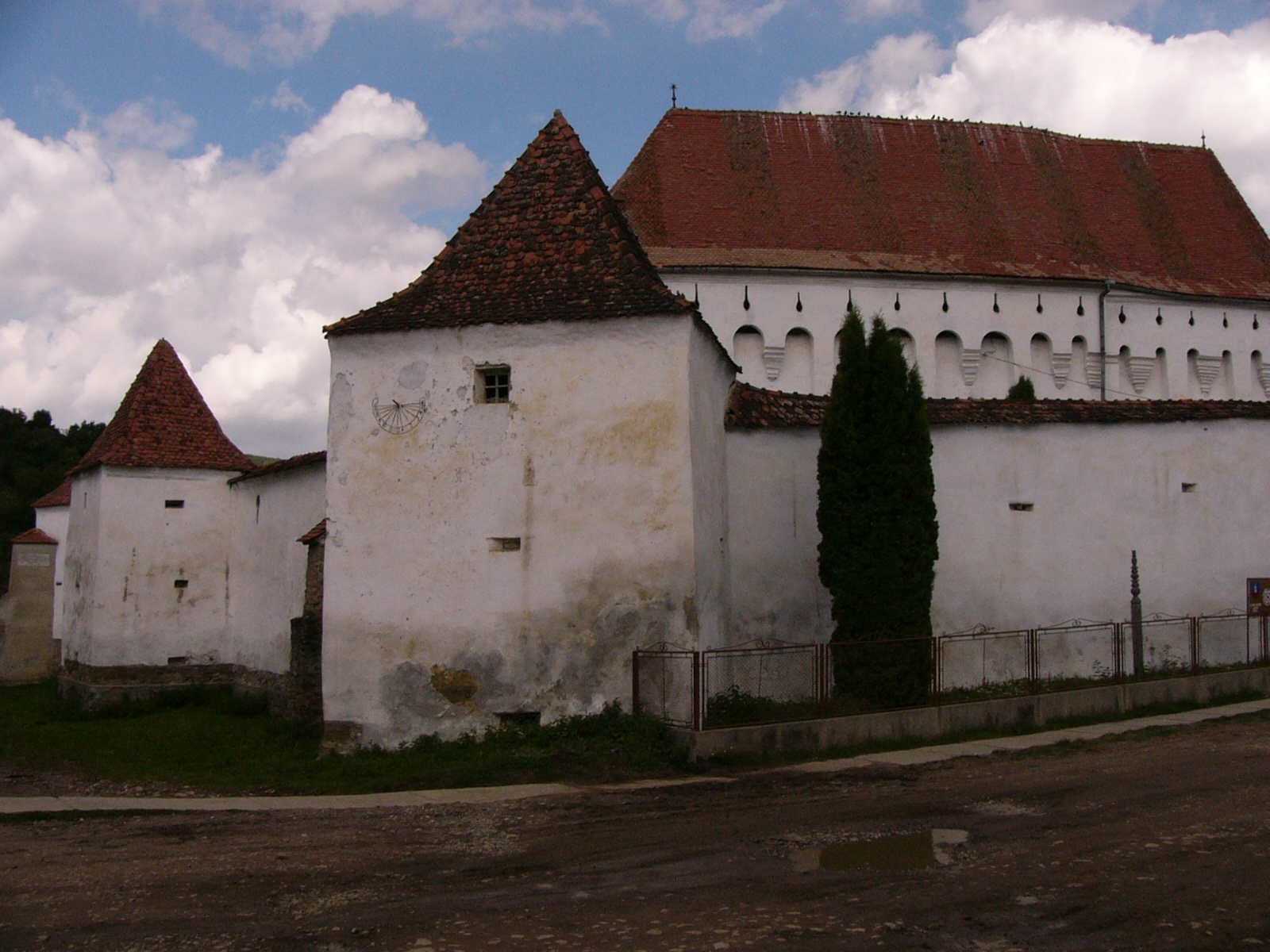
The Unitarian Church

The village is home to the Dârjiu fortified church, a 13th-century fortified Unitarian Church, which is on UNESCO's World Heritage List as a part of the Villages with Fortified Churches in Transylvania site.

The murals of the Unitarian church show the legend of Ladislaus I of Hungary. When the Cumans broke into Kingdom of Hungary, Ladislaus, still a duke, along with his cousin, King Salamon (Solomon) I, rode against them and freed a girl believed to be daughter of an aristocrat from captivity. Unfortunately enough, the girl did not support this act of the future saint.

Further murals in the region are to be found at Unitarian churches in Mugeni, Crăciunel (Karácsonyfalva; part of Ocland commune), and smaller ones in Rugănești (Rugonfalva; part of Șimonești commune) and Cristuru Secuiesc (Székelykeresztúr). The most significant murals in Saxon churches are those of Mălâncrav (German: Malmkrog, Hungarian: Szászszentlászló; part of Laslea commune).

== Twinning ==
Darány, Hungary

The local Unitarian community has relationship with the Unitarian Universalist Church in Cherry Hill, New Jersey, USA.

== See also ==
- List of castles in Romania
- Tourism in Romania
- Villages with fortified churches in Transylvania

Old Transylvanian churches with murals

- Ghelința, St. Emeric Church: 13th-century murals
- Laslea, Mălâncrav church: early 14th- and 15th-century murals
- Church on the Hill (Sighișoara), 14th-16th century murals

== Gallery ==
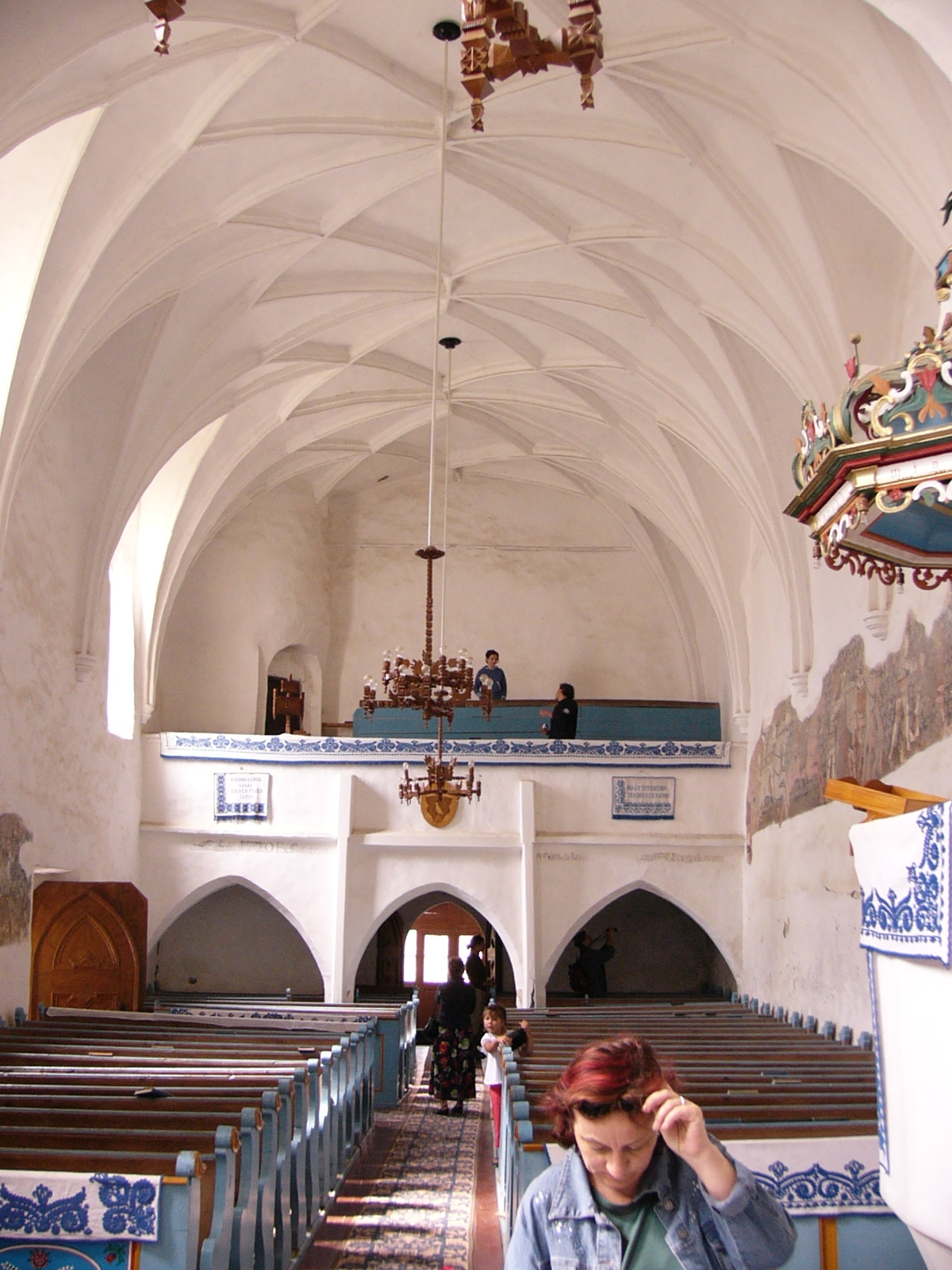
Unitarian church

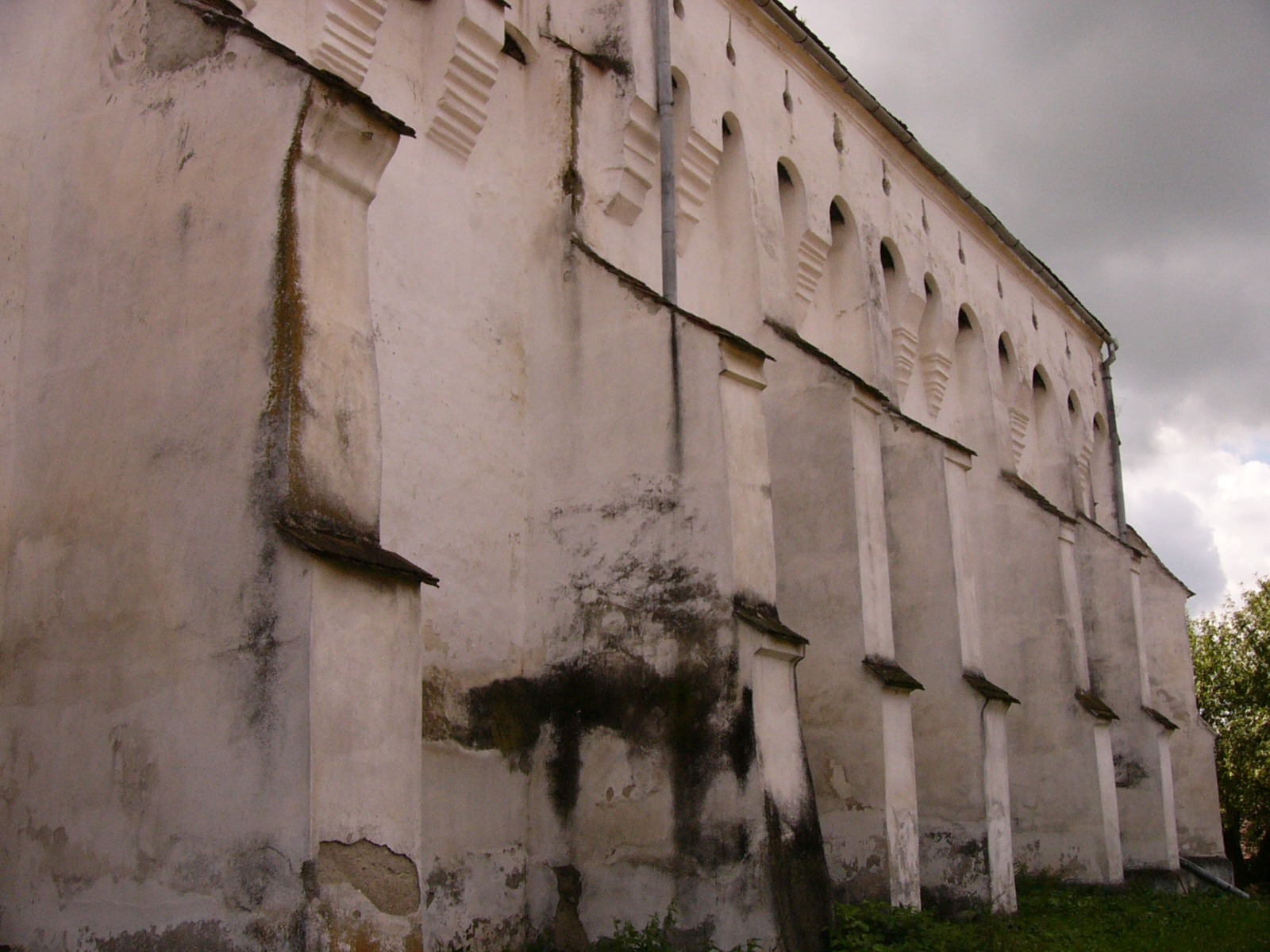
Façade of the Unitarian church

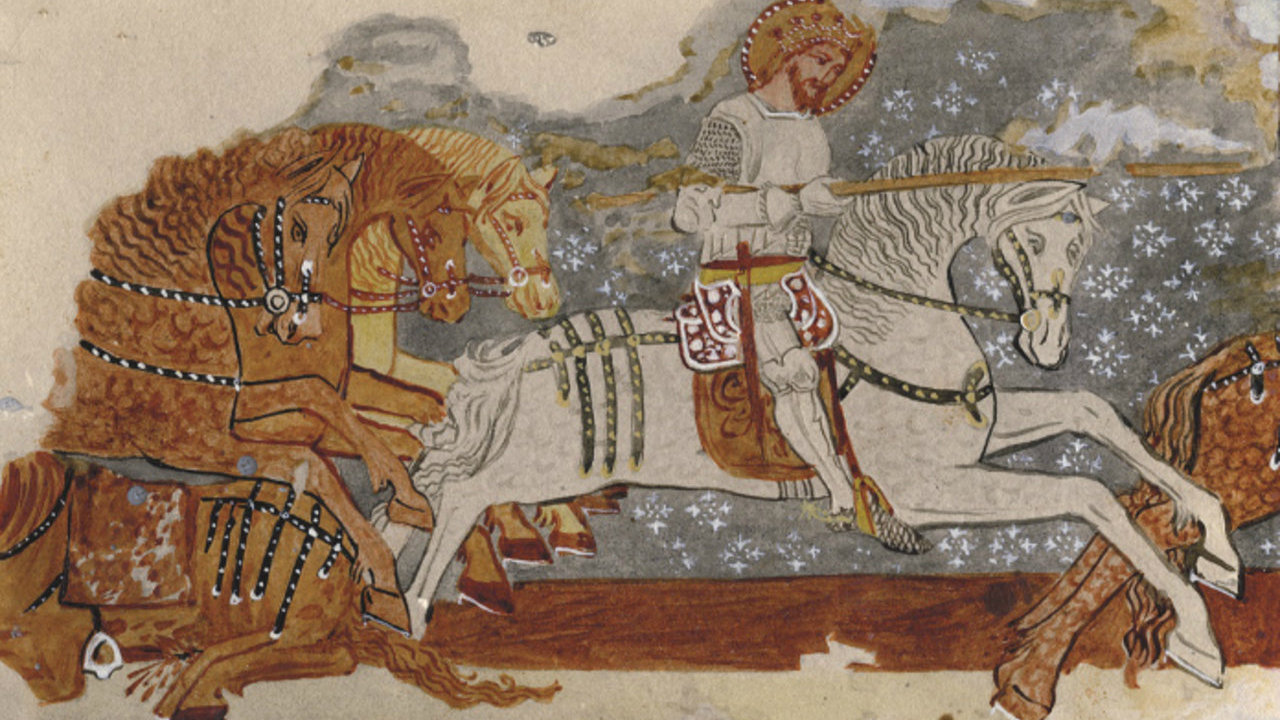
Murals on the St. Ladislaus legend

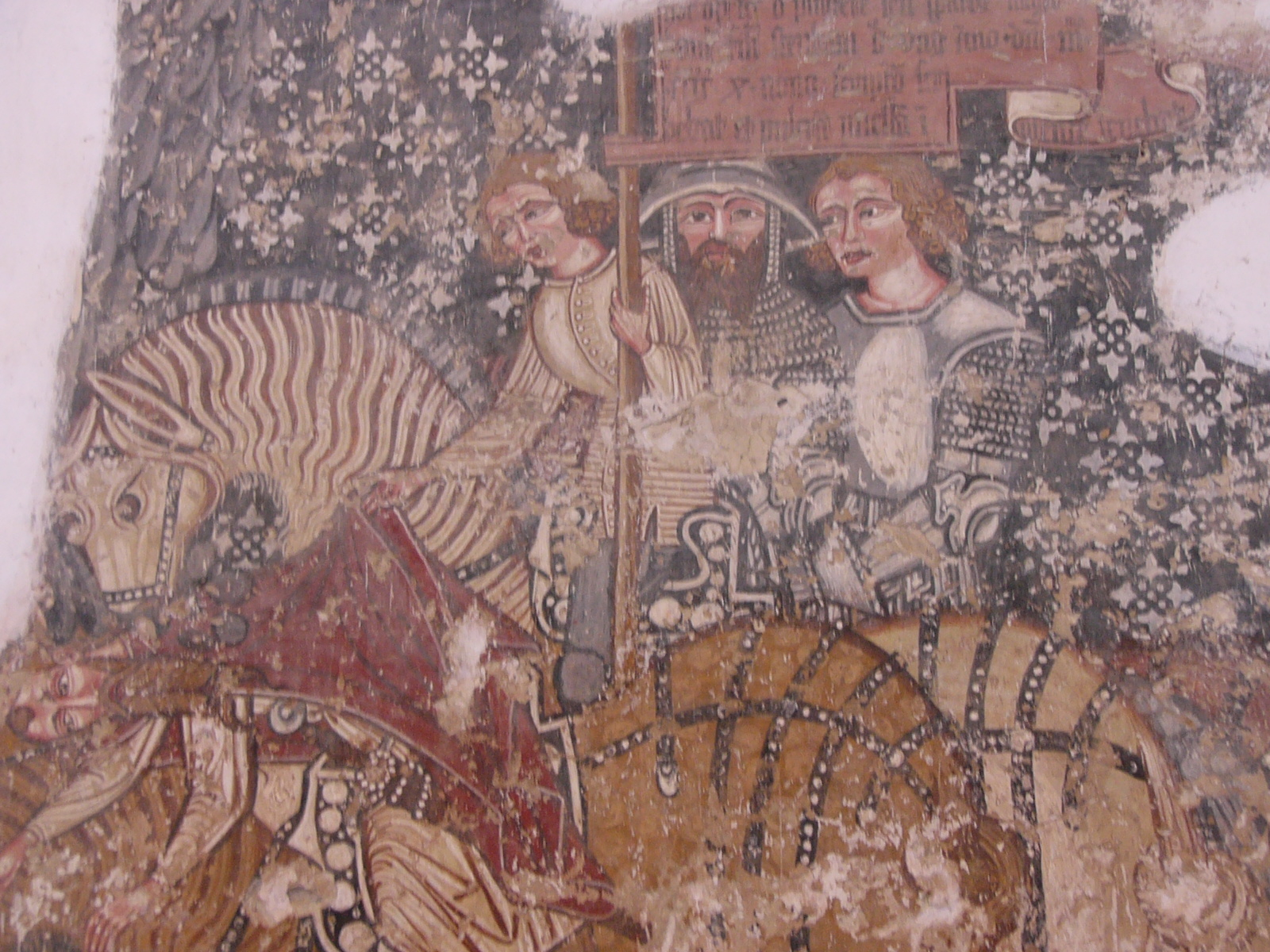
Murals on the St. Ladislaus legend

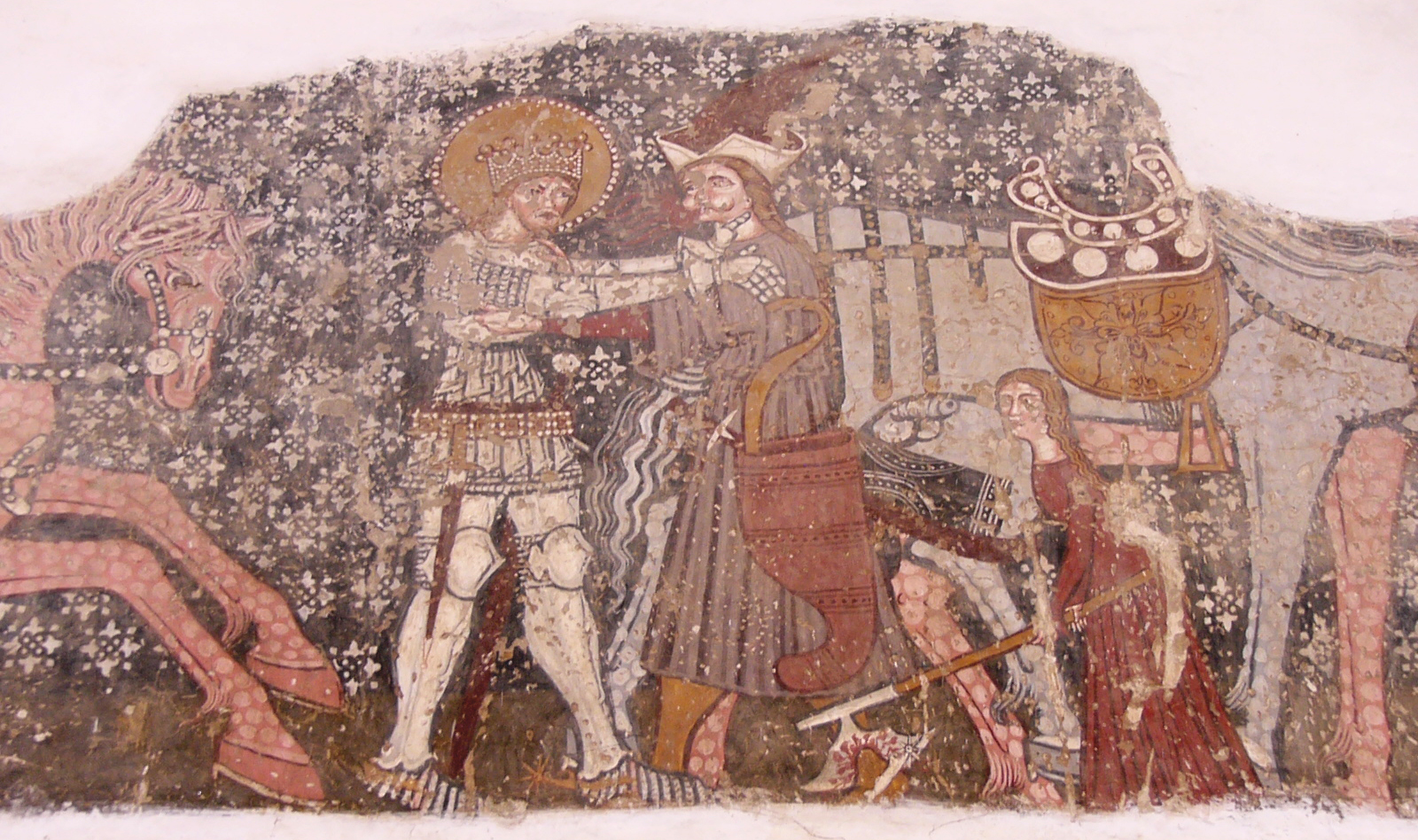
Fight of Ladislaus with the Cuman

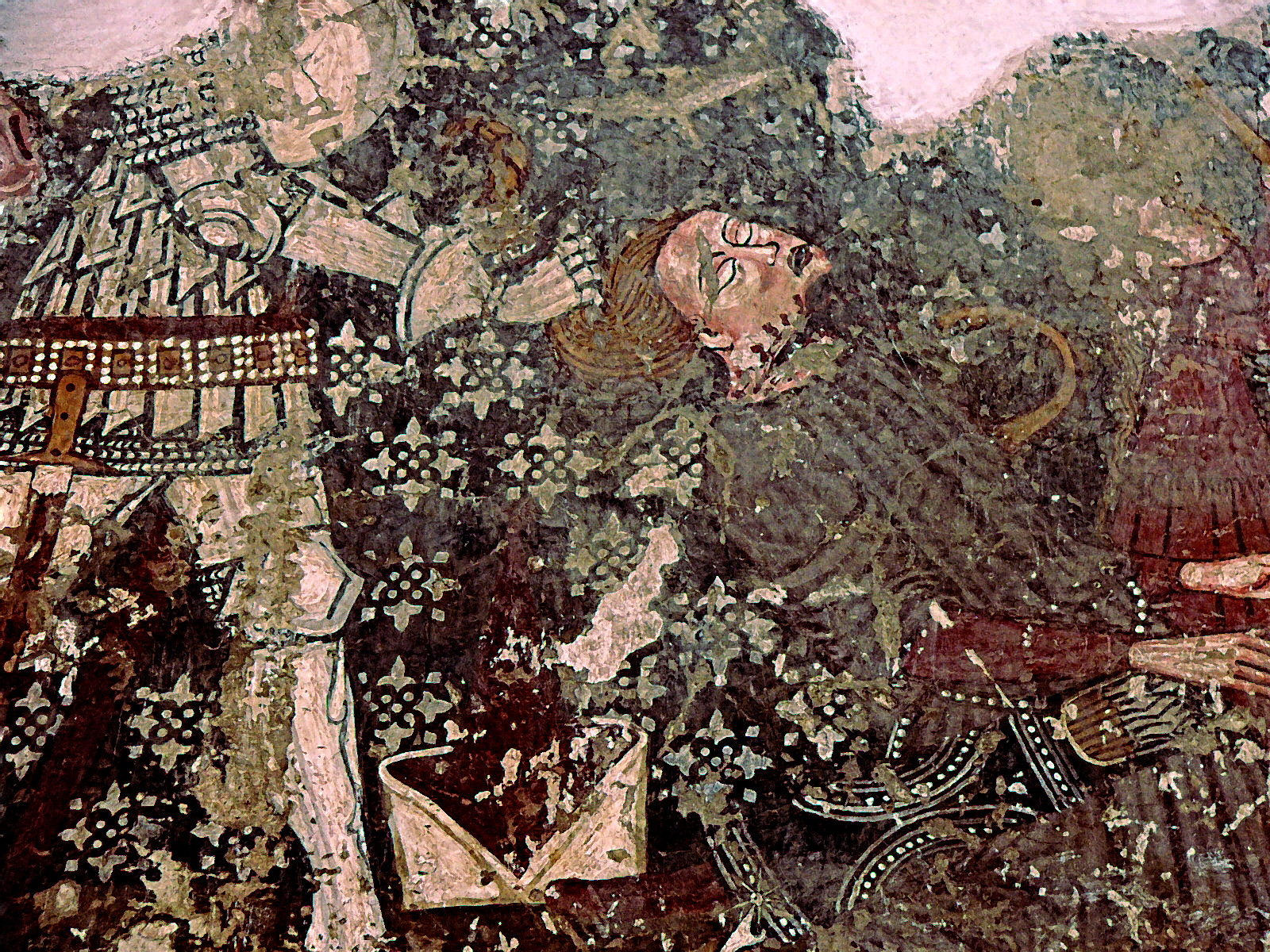
Death of the Cuman warrior

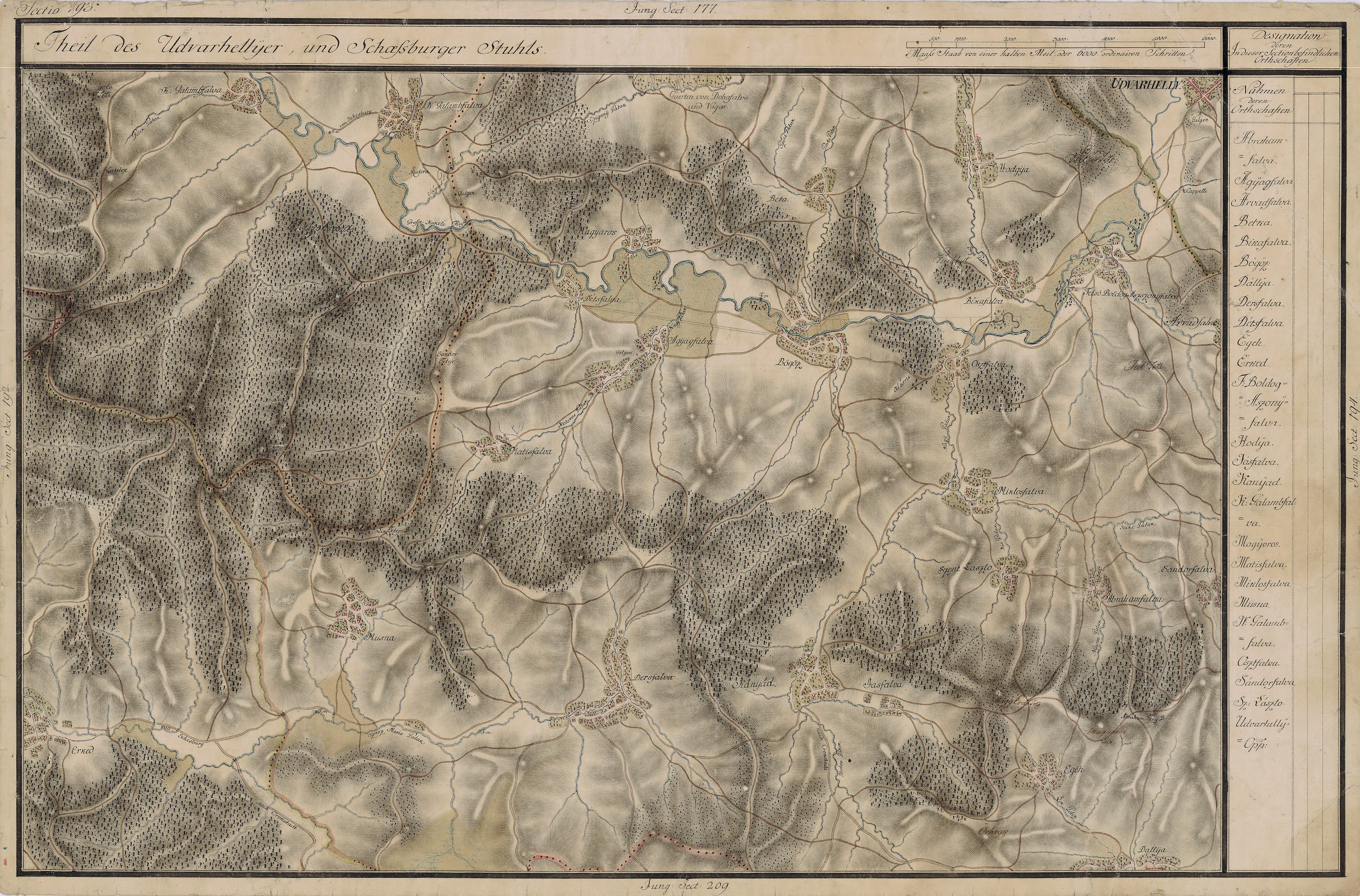
The village on the Josephinische Landaufnahme, 1769-1773
